= Jeeraphool rice =

Type of Non-Basmati aromatic rice from Chhattisgarh, India

Jeeraphool rice (जीराफूल चावल)
- Geographical indication
- Description: Jeeraphool rice is a rice variety cultivated in Chhattisgarh
- Area: Surguja
- Country: India
- Registered: 20 April 2020
- Official website: ipindia.gov.in

Jeeraphool rice is an ancient, indigenous, aromatic, and short-grained rice variety mainly grown in the Indian states of Chhattisgarh. It is a common and widely cultivated crop in Surguja district of Chhattisgarh in Ambikapur, Lakhanpur, Udaipur, Sitapur, Batauli, Lundra and Mainpat. The uniqueness is that the shape of the rice grain is shaped like a cumin.

Under its Geographical Indication tag, it is referred to as "Jeeraphool".

== Name ==
The rice grain resembles Cumin (Jeera in the local state language of Hindi) in appearance, which is why it's known as Jeeraphool.

=== Local Name ===
It is known locally as Jeeraphool Chawal. "Chawal" in Hindi means rice.

== Description ==
Some of the unique features of Jeeraphool rice are as below:

=== Characteristics ===
Jeeraphool rice is a premium, aromatic, short-grain rice variety resembling cumin in appearance. It's famous for its taste, aroma, and softness after cooking. This white, short-grain rice is strongly scented and soft when cooked, remaining flaky and soft even after cooling.

=== Cultivation ===
Jeeraphool rice is organically cultivated in Surguja district, Chhattisgarh, using traditional methods. The region's unique ecological conditions contribute to the rice's strong aroma and softness.

=== Usage ===
Jeeraphool rice is widely used for eating purposes, particularly for making Kheer (pudding) and Pulao. Its excellent eating quality is due to its high aroma, special softness, and unique taste after cooking. The flour of Jeeraphool rice is smooth and used to make various local dishes, including "Chausela" (Poori), anarsa, and chawal. The kheer made from Jeeraphool rice has a creamy texture and a unique flavor, requiring no additional flavorings.

=== Cultural Significance ===
This rice variety has been used in feasts and celebrations since ancient times, including in the Kingdom of Ambikeshwar Sharan Singhdev of the former Surguja State and the temple of Mahamaya Devi. It's also used to prepare traditional dishes like 'Basi Bhat' and is a key ingredient in local sweets and snacks.

== Geographical indication ==
It was awarded the Geographical Indication (GI) status tag from the Geographical Indications Registry, under the Union Government of India, on 14 March 2019 and is valid until 14 February 2028.

Jaivik Krishi Utpadak Sahkari Samiti Maryadit from Batauli, proposed the GI registration of Jeeraphool rice. After filing the application in February 2018, the rice was granted the GI tag in 2019 by the Geographical Indications Registry in Chennai, making the name "Jeeraphool" exclusive to the rice grown in the region. It thus became the first rice variety from Chhattisgarh before Nagri Dubraj rice and the 6th type of goods from Chhattisgarh to earn the GI tag respectively.

The GI tag protects the rice from illegal selling and marketing, and gives it legal protection and a unique identity.
