= Namna Kalan =

- Town
- Location in Chhattisgarh, India Namna Kalan (India)
- Coordinates: 23.13473°N 83.16993°E
- Country: India
- State: Chhattisgarh
- District: Surguja

Population (2001)
  - Total: 8,914

Languages
  - Official: Hindi, Chhattisgarhi
- Time zone: UTC+5:30 (IST)
- Vehicle registration: CG

Namna kalan is a town and a nagar panchayat in Surguja district in Indian state of Chhattisgarh.

== Demographics ==
As of 2001 India census, Namna Kalan had a population of 8914. Males constitute 52% of the population and females 48%. Namna Kalan has an average literacy rate of 73%, higher than the national average of 59.5%: male literacy is 79%, and female literacy is 67%. In Namna Kalan, 14% of the population is under 6 years of age.
