= Phunderdihari =

- Census town
- Location in Chhattisgarh, India Phunderdihari (India)
- Coordinates: 23.16446°N 83.18214°E
- Country: India
- State: Chhattisgarh
- District: Surguja

Population (2001)
  - Total: 16,106

Languages
  - Official: Hindi, Chhattisgarhi
- Time zone: UTC+5:30 (IST)
- Vehicle registration: CG

Phunderdihari is a census town in Surguja district in the Indian state of Chhattisgarh.

== Demographics ==
As of 2001 India census, Phunderdihari had a population of 16,106. Males constitute 51% of the population and females 49%. Phunderdihari has an average literacy rate of 77%, higher than the national average of 59.5%: male literacy is 82%, and female literacy is 72%. In Phunderdihari, 12% of the population is under 6 years of age.
