= Ramchandarpur =

Ramchandrapur
- Block
- Location in Chhattisgarh, India Ramchandrapur (India)
- Coordinates: 23.92°N 83.49°E
- Country: India
- State: Chhattisgarh
- District: Balrampur
- Block: Ramchandrapur

Languages
  - Official: Bhojpuri, Hindi
- Time zone: UTC+5:30 (IST)
- PIN: 497220
- Vehicle registration: CG

Ramchandrapur is an administrative block/Tehsil/Taluka of Balrampur district, in the Indian state of Chhattisgarh.

== Geography ==
Ramchandarpur is located 70 km North from District headquarters Balrampur, Chhattisgarh. Ramchandrapur Tehsil Headquarters is the Ramchadrapur town.

Ramchandrapur Tehsil is bounded by China Tehsil towards the East, Ranka Tehsil towards the East, Wadrafnagar Tehsil towards the west, Dandai Tehsil towards the North. Garhwa City, Renukoot City, Daltonganj City, Kota City are nearby cities.

It is 533m elevation (altitude). It sits on the border of the Surguja District and Garhwa District. Garhwa District Chinia is East towards it. Ramchandarpur is near to the Jharkhand State Border.

== Amenities ==
Notable tourist attractions include Surguja, Betla National Park, Palamu, Ambikapur and Rohtasgarh Fort.

== See also ==
- Balrampur district, Chhattisgarh
- Ramanujganj
