= Climate of Chhattisgarh =

The climate of Chhattisgarh is a tropical monsoon climate, consisting mainly of a tropical wet and dry climate (Aw) in the central plains and southern plateau, and a humid subtropical climate (Cwa) in the northern hilly regions. The state's landlocked position in Central India causes it to have a predominantly single climate pattern with regional variations influenced by its varied topography—from the edges of the Indo-Gangetic Plain in the north to the Deccan Plateau fringes in the south.

With temperatures fluctuating from 0 °C or 32 °F to 49 °C or 120 °F in several parts of the state and seasonal monsoon rains, the summers are extremely hot, the winters are pleasant to cold, and the rainy season is generally very wet due to the influence of the Bay of Bengal branch of the monsoon.

== Classification ==
Köppen climate classification map of India

The climate of Chhattisgarh is generally defined to be tropical monsoon. However, based on the Köppen climate classification, it can be classified mostly as tropical wet and dry (Aw) type with the northern hilly regions marked as humid subtropical with dry winter (Cwa).

Given significant geographical differences, Chhattisgarh is divided into three agro-climatic zones: the Bastar Plateau, the Chhattisgarh Plains, and the Northern Hilly Region.

== Seasons ==
According to the India Meteorological Department, Chhattisgarh has three predominant seasons.

The retreating monsoon season, occurring in October and November, marks the transition from the rainy season to winter, often accompanied by clear skies and decreasing humidity. Occasional mild showers are experienced in winter due to western disturbances.

=== Summer ===
Summer lasts from March to May. It is hot and dry, and temperatures in the central plains rise to 45 °C or 113 °F, with record highs reaching 48 or 49 °C or 118.4 or 120.2 °F in districts like Bilaspur. The relative humidity is low, and hot winds known as loo are common.

=== Monsoon ===
The monsoon season lasts from June to September. It accounts for nearly 90 per cent of the average annual rainfall. The arrival of the monsoon brings relief from the summer heat, though humidity levels rise significantly.

=== Winter ===
Winter lasts from November to February. Morning temperatures in the northern plateau (e.g., Mainpat) can drop to 0 to 2 °C or 32.0 to 35.6 °F, and sometimes drop below freezing. The skies are generally clear with occasional foggy conditions in the morning.

== Temperature ==
Temperature varies from 0 to 49 °C (32.0 to 120.2 °F). Such a wide range of temperature fluctuations leads to seasonal heat waves and cold waves.

=== Heat waves ===
The central plains, particularly Bilaspur and Raigarh, are prone to severe heat waves. In 2017, Bilaspur recorded an all-time high of 49.3 °C or 120.7 °F. These waves often cause water shortages and health risks.

=== Cold waves ===
In recent years, northern districts like Surguja have experienced severe cold waves. In January 2026, temperatures as low as 3.5 °C or 38.3 °F were recorded in Ambikapur. Mainpat, often called the "Shimla of Chhattisgarh," frequently sees sub-zero temperatures.

== Precipitation ==
Chhattisgarh receives significant rainfall, predominantly from the southwest monsoon. The rainfall type is mainly orographic in the hilly regions and convectional in the plains.

=== Rain ===
The Bay of Bengal branch of the Indian Monsoon is the primary source of rain. The state receives an annual average rainfall of approximately 1,292 mm. The southern Bastar region and the northern Abujmarh area receive the highest rainfall, sometimes exceeding 1,500 mm.

=== Floods ===
Floods occur periodically due to the overflowing of major rivers like the Mahanadi, Indravati, and Hasdeo. Heavy monsoon spells in the catchment areas of these rivers can cause severe inundation in low-lying areas.

=== Droughts ===
Variability in monsoon arrival can lead to droughts, particularly in the rain-shadow areas of the Maikal Hills (e.g., Kawardha) and parts of the central plains.

== Wind ==
In summer, hot winds called loo blow across the central plains. These are dust-laden and can cause heatstroke. In winter, dry and cool northeasterly winds prevail across the state.

== Climate data ==
=== Raipur ===
Raipur has a tropical wet and dry climate that corresponds to the Köppen climate classification category Aw, and temperatures remain moderate throughout the year, except from March to June, which can be extremely hot. The temperature in April–May sometimes rises above 48 °C (118 °F). These summer months also have dry and hot winds. The city receives about 1,300 millimetres (51 in) of rain, mostly in the monsoon season from mid June to early October. Winters last from November to February and are mild, although lows can fall to 5 °C (41 °F) making it reasonably cold.

Climate data for Raipur (1991–2020, extremes 1901–present)
Month	Jan	Feb	Mar	Apr	May	Jun	Jul	Aug	Sep	Oct	Nov	Dec	Year
Record high °C (°F)	36.5 (97.7)	38.0 (100.4)	43.3 (109.9)	46.1 (115.0)	47.9 (118.2)	47.2 (117.0)	41.2 (106.2)	37.5 (99.5)	37.2 (99.0)	37.9 (100.2)	35.6 (96.1)	34.1 (93.4)	47.9 (118.2)
Mean daily maximum °C (°F)	28.0 (82.4)	31.1 (88.0)	35.2 (95.4)	39.5 (103.1)	41.8 (107.2)	37.1 (98.8)	31.3 (88.3)	30.4 (86.7)	31.6 (88.9)	31.9 (89.4)	30.4 (86.7)	28.5 (83.3)	33.0 (91.4)
Daily mean °C (°F)	20.8 (69.4)	23.8 (74.8)	26.5 (79.7)	32.1 (89.8)	35.1 (95.2)	32.0 (89.6)	27.8 (82.0)	27.2 (81.0)	27.9 (82.2)	26.9 (80.4)	23.7 (74.7)	21.0 (69.8)	27.1 (80.7)
Mean daily minimum °C (°F)	13.9 (57.0)	16.9 (62.4)	20.9 (69.6)	24.8 (76.6)	27.8 (82.0)	26.7 (80.1)	24.6 (76.3)	24.5 (76.1)	24.4 (75.9)	22.0 (71.6)	17.4 (63.3)	13.8 (56.8)	21.5 (70.7)
Record low °C (°F)	5.0 (41.0)	5.0 (41.0)	8.3 (46.9)	15.0 (59.0)	14.4 (57.9)	16.1 (61.0)	17.1 (62.8)	20.0 (68.0)	18.3 (64.9)	13.9 (57.0)	8.3 (46.9)	3.9 (39.0)	3.9 (39.0)
Average rainfall mm (inches)	14.4 (0.57)	16.3 (0.64)	13.2 (0.52)	15.7 (0.62)	23.8 (0.94)	197.8 (7.79)	377.4 (14.86)	334.2 (13.16)	235.5 (9.27)	46.9 (1.85)	8.2 (0.32)	6.9 (0.27)	1,290.3 (50.80)
Average rainy days	1.2	1.2	1.5	1.7	1.9	9.1	14.4	14.4	9.6	2.8	0.5	0.3	58.6
Average relative humidity (%) (at 17:30 IST)	43	35	29	24	26	52	76	79	74	62	53	47	50
Source 1: India Meteorological Department
Source 2: Tokyo Climate Center (mean temperatures 1991–2020)

Climate data for Raipur (Swami Vivekananda Airport) 1991-2020
Month	Jan	Feb	Mar	Apr	May	Jun	Jul	Aug	Sep	Oct	Nov	Dec	Year
Record high °C (°F)	35.7 (96.3)	38.7 (101.7)	42.4 (108.3)	45.4 (113.7)	47.4 (117.3)	47.2 (117.0)	41.5 (106.7)	37.2 (99.0)	39.9 (103.8)	36.8 (98.2)	35.5 (95.9)	33.0 (91.4)	47.4 (117.3)
Mean daily maximum °C (°F)	28.0 (82.4)	31.1 (88.0)	35.7 (96.3)	39.6 (103.3)	41.9 (107.4)	37.0 (98.6)	31.4 (88.5)	30.3 (86.5)	31.5 (88.7)	31.9 (89.4)	30.4 (86.7)	28.3 (82.9)	33.1 (91.6)
Mean daily minimum °C (°F)	13.3 (55.9)	16.3 (61.3)	20.6 (69.1)	24.5 (76.1)	27.6 (81.7)	26.2 (79.2)	24.5 (76.1)	24.2 (75.6)	24.0 (75.2)	21.5 (70.7)	17.0 (62.6)	13.3 (55.9)	21.0 (69.8)
Record low °C (°F)	5.7 (42.3)	8.4 (47.1)	12.4 (54.3)	16.5 (61.7)	19.2 (66.6)	19.5 (67.1)	20.0 (68.0)	20.2 (68.4)	19.8 (67.6)	12.2 (54.0)	9.9 (49.8)	7.1 (44.8)	5.7 (42.3)
Average rainfall mm (inches)	14.1 (0.56)	16.2 (0.64)	15.0 (0.59)	18.9 (0.74)	23.4 (0.92)	200.3 (7.89)	362.8 (14.28)	336.3 (13.24)	194.7 (7.67)	53.8 (2.12)	8.7 (0.34)	4.6 (0.18)	1,248.8 (49.17)
Average rainy days	1.1	1.3	1.4	1.6	2.2	8.8	14.8	15.3	9.2	3.2	0.5	0.4	59.7
Average relative humidity (%) (at 17:30 IST)	39	31	24	21	23	51	74	79	73	60	49	41	47
Source: India Meteorological Department

Raipur has been ranked the eighth-best National Clean Air City (under Category I: Cities with population above 10 Lakhs) in India according to the Swachh Vayu Survekshan 2024 Results.

=== Ambikapur ===
Climate data for Ambikapur, Chhattisgarh, elevation 611 m (2,005 ft), (1991–2020, extremes 1951–2012)
Month	Jan	Feb	Mar	Apr	May	Jun	Jul	Aug	Sep	Oct	Nov	Dec	Year
Record high °C (°F)	30.5 (86.9)	34.8 (94.6)	39.7 (103.5)	43.8 (110.8)	44.8 (112.6)	44.9 (112.8)	38.4 (101.1)	36.1 (97.0)	35.7 (96.3)	34.5 (94.1)	32.4 (90.3)	29.5 (85.1)	44.9 (112.8)
Mean daily maximum °C (°F)	22.9 (73.2)	26.8 (80.2)	32.4 (90.3)	37.0 (98.6)	39.8 (103.6)	35.5 (95.9)	29.9 (85.8)	29.2 (84.6)	29.6 (85.3)	29.0 (84.2)	25.9 (78.6)	23.2 (73.8)	30.0 (86.0)
Mean daily minimum °C (°F)	9.0 (48.2)	12.0 (53.6)	16.4 (61.5)	21.3 (70.3)	25.2 (77.4)	24.9 (76.8)	23.3 (73.9)	23.0 (73.4)	22.1 (71.8)	18.3 (64.9)	13.2 (55.8)	8.9 (48.0)	18.1 (64.6)
Record low °C (°F)	0.9 (33.6)	2.5 (36.5)	7.8 (46.0)	10.6 (51.1)	16.1 (61.0)	17.2 (63.0)	16.4 (61.5)	19.8 (67.6)	15.7 (60.3)	9.4 (48.9)	4.2 (39.6)	1.7 (35.1)	0.9 (33.6)
Average rainfall mm (inches)	20.3 (0.80)	18.5 (0.73)	23.3 (0.92)	18.9 (0.74)	20.7 (0.81)	211.0 (8.31)	395.4 (15.57)	367.3 (14.46)	226.4 (8.91)	56.9 (2.24)	14.2 (0.56)	6.4 (0.25)	1,379.2 (54.30)
Average rainy days	1.9	1.6	2.0	1.8	2.1	9.7	16.8	16.5	11.0	3.6	1.1	0.5	68.5
Average relative humidity (%) (at 17:30 IST)	50	40	29	25	28	56	80	84	80	67	60	55	55
Source: India Meteorological Department

=== Bilaspur ===
The climate in Bilaspur, Chhattisgarh has been colder than the Raipur region for the winters in December (minimum temperature 6 °C, 42 °F in the last week of December annually, while some areas have even reported temperature going down as low as 3-4 °C, 37 °F), which resembles northern Chhattisgarh. However most of the winter goes mild and pleasant. The city experiences moderate rains in the monsoon. The summers are relatively hot and dry, with maximum temperature 48+ °C, 113 °F.

Climate data for Bilaspur (1991–2020)
Month	Jan	Feb	Mar	Apr	May	Jun	Jul	Aug	Sep	Oct	Nov	Dec	Year
Record high °C (°F)	35.6 (96.1)	38.2 (100.8)	43.2 (109.8)	45.8 (114.4)	49.3 (120.7)	47.2 (117.0)	41.0 (105.8)	36.2 (97.2)	36.6 (97.9)	37.0 (98.6)	35.1 (95.2)	33.6 (92.5)	49.3 (120.7)
Mean daily maximum °C (°F)	27.6 (81.7)	30.8 (87.4)	36.4 (97.5)	40.2 (104.4)	42.4 (108.3)	36.5 (97.7)	32.6 (90.7)	31.4 (88.5)	32.1 (89.8)	32.2 (90.0)	30.8 (87.4)	28.8 (83.8)	33.2 (91.8)
Mean daily minimum °C (°F)	11.6 (52.9)	14.3 (57.7)	18.8 (65.8)	23.5 (74.3)	26.4 (79.5)	25.7 (78.3)	24.8 (76.6)	24.8 (76.6)	23.8 (74.8)	20.4 (68.7)	16.0 (60.8)	12.4 (54.3)	20.3 (68.5)
Record low °C (°F)	5.9 (42.6)	8.3 (46.9)	12.5 (54.5)	16.4 (61.5)	21.0 (69.8)	21.6 (70.9)	20.9 (69.6)	22.4 (72.3)	19.4 (66.9)	12.0 (53.6)	9.2 (48.6)	6.5 (43.7)	5.9 (42.6)
Average rainfall mm (inches)	20.6 (0.81)	17.6 (0.69)	18.1 (0.71)	22.8 (0.90)	16.5 (0.65)	144.8 (5.70)	317.3 (12.49)	365.8 (14.40)	215.5 (8.48)	55.9 (2.20)	8.3 (0.33)	4.7 (0.19)	1,208.1 (47.56)
Average rainy days	1.5	1.6	1.8	1.9	1.7	8.8	15.9	15.7	9.8	3.2	0.8	0.5	63.0
Source: India Meteorological Department

=== Jagdalpur ===
Jagdalpur has a tropical savanna climate (Köppen climate classification Aw) with three main seasons: summer, monsoon, and winter. Summers last from March to May and are hot, with the average maximum for May reaching 38.1 °C (100.6 °F). The weather cools off somewhat for the monsoon season from June to September, which features very heavy rainfall. Winters are warm and dry.

Climate data for Jagdalpur (1991–2020, extremes 1909–2020)
Month	Jan	Feb	Mar	Apr	May	Jun	Jul	Aug	Sep	Oct	Nov	Dec	Year
Record high °C (°F)	34.8 (94.6)	38.7 (101.7)	40.6 (105.1)	43.3 (109.9)	46.1 (115.0)	45.5 (113.9)	38.9 (102.0)	39.8 (103.6)	34.2 (93.6)	36.1 (97.0)	34.1 (93.4)	32.8 (91.0)	46.1 (115.0)
Mean daily maximum °C (°F)	28.8 (83.8)	31.6 (88.9)	35.2 (95.4)	37.2 (99.0)	37.9 (100.2)	33.3 (91.9)	29.2 (84.6)	28.7 (83.7)	30.2 (86.4)	30.8 (87.4)	29.7 (85.5)	28.5 (83.3)	31.7 (89.1)
Daily mean °C (°F)	20.3 (68.5)	23.1 (73.6)	27.1 (80.8)	29.7 (85.5)	31.0 (87.8)	28.4 (83.1)	25.9 (78.6)	25.5 (77.9)	26.3 (79.3)	25.4 (77.7)	22.7 (72.9)	19.8 (67.6)	25.4 (77.8)
Mean daily minimum °C (°F)	11.8 (53.2)	14.7 (58.5)	18.8 (65.8)	22.4 (72.3)	24.2 (75.6)	23.9 (75.0)	22.8 (73.0)	22.5 (72.5)	22.4 (72.3)	20.1 (68.2)	15.6 (60.1)	11.3 (52.3)	19.2 (66.6)
Record low °C (°F)	2.8 (37.0)	5.0 (41.0)	8.5 (47.3)	13.9 (57.0)	17.2 (63.0)	14.5 (58.1)	18.3 (64.9)	16.7 (62.1)	17.6 (63.7)	11.1 (52.0)	5.6 (42.1)	3.9 (39.0)	2.8 (37.0)
Average rainfall mm (inches)	10.7 (0.42)	6.8 (0.27)	18.8 (0.74)	54.4 (2.14)	79.4 (3.13)	234.9 (9.25)	369.1 (14.53)	366.8 (14.44)	246.4 (9.70)	93.5 (3.68)	22.4 (0.88)	4.7 (0.19)	1,508 (59.37)
Average rainy days	0.9	0.6	1.4	3.7	5.3	10.1	17.4	18.2	11.7	4.9	1.3	0.5	75.9
Average relative humidity (%) (at 17:30 IST)	48	39	34	38	45	67	82	83	79	70	62	55	58
Source 1: India Meteorological Department
Source 2: Tokyo Climate Center (mean temperatures 1991–2020)
