= Nunera =

- village
- Location in Chhattisgarh, India Nunera (India)
- Coordinates: 22.35747°N 82.41975°E
- Country: India
- State: Chhattisgarh
- District: Korba

Government
  - Type: State Government
  - Sarpanch: Mr. Mukesh Kumar Shrotey
  - Panchayat President: Rupesh Choubey

Population (2003)
  - Total: 2,370

Languages
  - Official: Hindi, Chhattisgarhi
- Time zone: UTC+5:30 (IST)
- PIN: 495449
- Vehicle registration: CG

Nunera is a small village located in surguja districtsurguja district, Chhattisgarh, India. It has a population of just over 2000 people. The village has a post office.

== Administration ==
Nunera is a Village Panchayat under Bonakal intermediate Panchayat.

== Education ==
The village has two high school 1.H S School KHAMHARIYA. 2.NUNERA SHIVPUR.
