= Basna =

- town
- Location in Chhattisgarh, India Basna (India)
- Coordinates: 21.28°N 82.82°E
- Country: India
- State: Chhattisgarh
- District: Mahasamund
- Elevation: 266 m (873 ft)

Population (2011)
  - Total: 12,368

Languages
  - Official: Hindi, Chhattisgarhi
- Time zone: UTC+5:30 (IST)
- Vehicle registration: CG 06

Basna is a town in Mahasamund district in the Chhattisgarh state of India.

== Geography ==
Basna is located at 21.28°N 82.82°E. It has an average elevation of 266 metres (872 feet).

Basna is 90 km (56 mi) from District Headquarter Mahasamund and 136 km (85 mi) from Raipur the capital city of Chhattisgarh. The Odisha border is very near around (15 km (9.3 mi)) from Basna.

== History ==
Narsinghnath is just 47 km (29 mi) away from Basna. It is the place where Ram and Sita spent their time during their 14 years of vanvas (living in a forest). The people also claim that during the Mahabharata period, the Pandavas had also stayed here. Narsinghnath pitha is an example of religious and cultural synthesis of tribal and non-tribal people (Pasayat, 1998, 2003, 2005 2007, 2008).

== Demographics ==
As of 2001 India census, Basna had a population of 12368. Males constitute 54% of the population and females 46%. Basna has an average literacy rate of 76%, higher than the national average of 59.5%; with 57% of the males and 43% of females literate. 14% of the population is under 6 years of age.
