= Sanawal =

Sanawal is a village in Ramchandarpur Tehsil in Balrampur District of Chattissgarh State of India. It is located 119 km towards North from Ambikapur.
