= Shankargarh, Balrampur =

Shankargarh
- Block
- Location in Chhattisgarh, India Shankargarh (India)
- Coordinates: 23.30°N 83.60°E
- Country: India
- State: Chhattisgarh
- District: Balrampur
- Block: Shankargarh

Languages
  - Official: Chhattisgarhi, Hindi
- Time zone: UTC+5:30 (IST)
- PIN: 497118
- Vehicle registration: CG 15

Shankargarh is one of the administrative blocks of Balrampur district, Chhattisgarh state, India.

It is located 60 km north east of Ambikapur.
