= Rajpur, Balrampur =

Rajpur
- Block
- Location in Chhattisgarh, India Rajpur (India)
- Coordinates: 23.335°N 83.413°E
- Country: India
- State: Chhattisgarh
- District: Balrampur
- Block: Rajpur

Languages
  - Official: Hindi
- Time zone: UTC+5:30 (IST)
- PIN: 497118
- Vehicle registration: CG

Rajpur is one of the six block divisions of Balrampur district, Chhattisgarh, along with Balrampur, Shankargarh, Kusmi, Ramchandarpur, and Wadrafnagar.
