= SGJ =

SGJ or sgj may refer to:

- SGJ, the FAA LID code for Northeast Florida Regional Airport, United States
- sgj, the ISO 639-3 code for Surgujia dialect, Chhattisgarh, India
