= Balrampur district, Chhattisgarh =

Balrampur-Ramanujganj district
- District
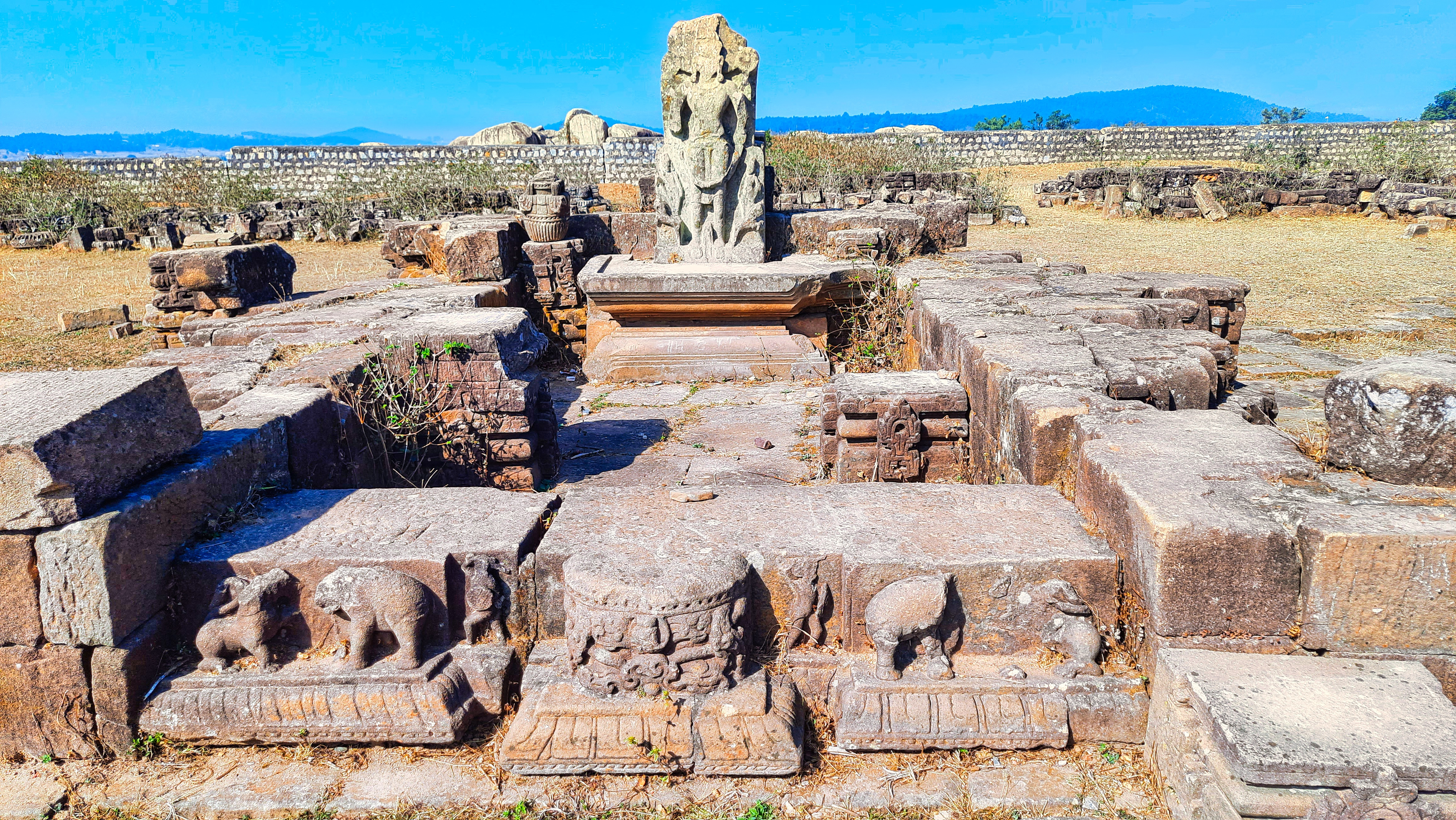
- Ruined temple near Rani Talab, Dipadih
- Interactive map of Balrampur-Ramanujganj district
- Country: India
- State: Chhattisgarh
- Division: Surguja
- Headquarters: Balrampur
- Tehsils: 10

Area
  - Total: 7,213 km^{2} (2,785 sq mi)

Population
  - Total: 730,491
  - Density: 101.3/km^{2} (262.3/sq mi)

Demographics
  - Literacy: 54.24
- Time zone: UTC+05:30 (IST)
- PIN: 497xxx (Balrampur)
- Major highways: NH 343
- Website: balrampur.gov.in

Balrampur-Ramanujganj district is a northern district in the Indian state of Chhattisgarh. It came into existence on 17 January 2012 and was formerly part of Surguja district. Balrampur-Ramanujganj district is the northernmost district of Chhattisgarh. Its seat is Balrampur.

Ramanujganj is one of the historical places in Balrampur district. It is the most populous town of the Balrampur district. Ramanujganj is the border town of Chhattishgarh-Jharkhand State. The nearest airports are Ranchi and Raipur. The nearest railway stations are Garhwa and Ambikapur. Balrampur district borders Jharkhand in the east, Uttar Pradesh in the north, Madhya Pradesh in the west. 63% population are from Scheduled Tribes.

== Geography ==
Balrampur district is mainly mountainous. In the south-west of the district is part of the Surguja Plateau. In the north of the district there are a set of parallel ranges. To the south of these ranges are several of the pats that make Surguja unique, which are some of the highest points in Chhattisgarh. On the border with Jharkhand are several more pats.

There are several rivers in Balrampur district. The Kanhar river, a tributary of the Son, has its source near Kusmi in the south of the district and forms much of its border with Jharkhand.

== Tourism ==
Major tourist attractions include:

- Dipadih (Ancient Sculptors)
- Rakasganda,
- Tatapani (hot spring)

== Education ==
The only university in Balrampur-Ramanujganj district is Sarguja University created on 2 September 2008.

== Administration ==
=== Blocks/Mandals ===
Balrampur-Ramanujganj district consists of 10 Tehsils. The following are the list of the Tehsils of Balrampur district:

- Balrampur
- Rajpur
- Shankargarh
- Kusmi
- Ramanujganj
- Wadrafnagar
- Chando
- Daura-Kochli
- Ramchandrapur
- Raghunathnagar

== Demographics ==
Religions in Balrampur district (2011)
Religion	Percent
Hinduism	86.82%
Other (tribal religion)	5.02%
Islam	4.59%
Christianity	3.41%
Other or not stated	0.16%

As of the 2011 census, the population of Balrampur district was 730,491, of which 34,683 (4.75%) live in urban areas. Balrampur district has a sex ratio of 973 females per 1000 males. Scheduled Castes and Scheduled Tribes made up 4.48% and 62.83% of the population respectively.

Languages of Balrampur district (2011)
1. Surgujia (32.9%)
2. Sadri (26.4%)
3. Hindi (12.3%)
4. Bhojpuri (8.76%)
5. Kurukh (7.35%)
6. 'Other' Hindi (4.44%)
7. Korwa (1.84%)
8. Gondi (1.58%)
9. Bengali (1.37%)
10. Pandwani (0.93%)
11. Others (2.06%)

According to the 2011 census, 32.92% of the population spoke Surgujia, 26.43% Sadri, 12.32% Hindi, 8.76% Bhojpuri, 7.35% Kurukh, 1.84% Korwa, 1.58% Gondi, 1.37% Bengali and 0.93% Pandwani as their first language.
