= Dipadih =

Dipahdih is an archaeological place of Balrampur district, Chhattisgarh, India. It is about 75 km from Ambikapur, headquarters of Surguja. It contains the remnants of the Shaiv and Shakya sects.
