= Sitapur, Chhattisgarh =

Sitapur
- Town
- Location in India
- Coordinates: 22.780925°N 83.49545°E
- Country: India
- State: Chhattisgarh
- District: Surguja
- Settled: 4 September 1781
- Incorporated: 4 April 1850

Area
  - Total: 3.5 sq mi (9 km^{2})
- Elevation: 2,100 ft (640 m)

Population (2011)
  - Total: 9,361
  - Density: 2,400/sq mi (926/km^{2})
- Demonym: Indian

Languages
  - Official: Hindi, Chhattisgarhi
- Time zone: UTC+5:30 (IST)
- PIN: 497111
- Vehicle registration: CG 15 or MP 27
- Website: surguja.nic.in

Sitapur is a town of Surguja district, Chhattisgarh, India. It is surrounded by the river Mand in the east and hills in the west. The tourism spot Mainpat (which is also called Shimla of Chhattisgarh) is 30 kilometres from the town. Mainpat mountain has huge deposits of bauxite ore which are processed at Hindalco factory at Renukoot (UP). Sitapur is 52 km from Ambikapur, the district capital of Surguja.
