= Surguja district =

Coordinates: 23°07′N 83°12′E

- District of Chhattisgarh
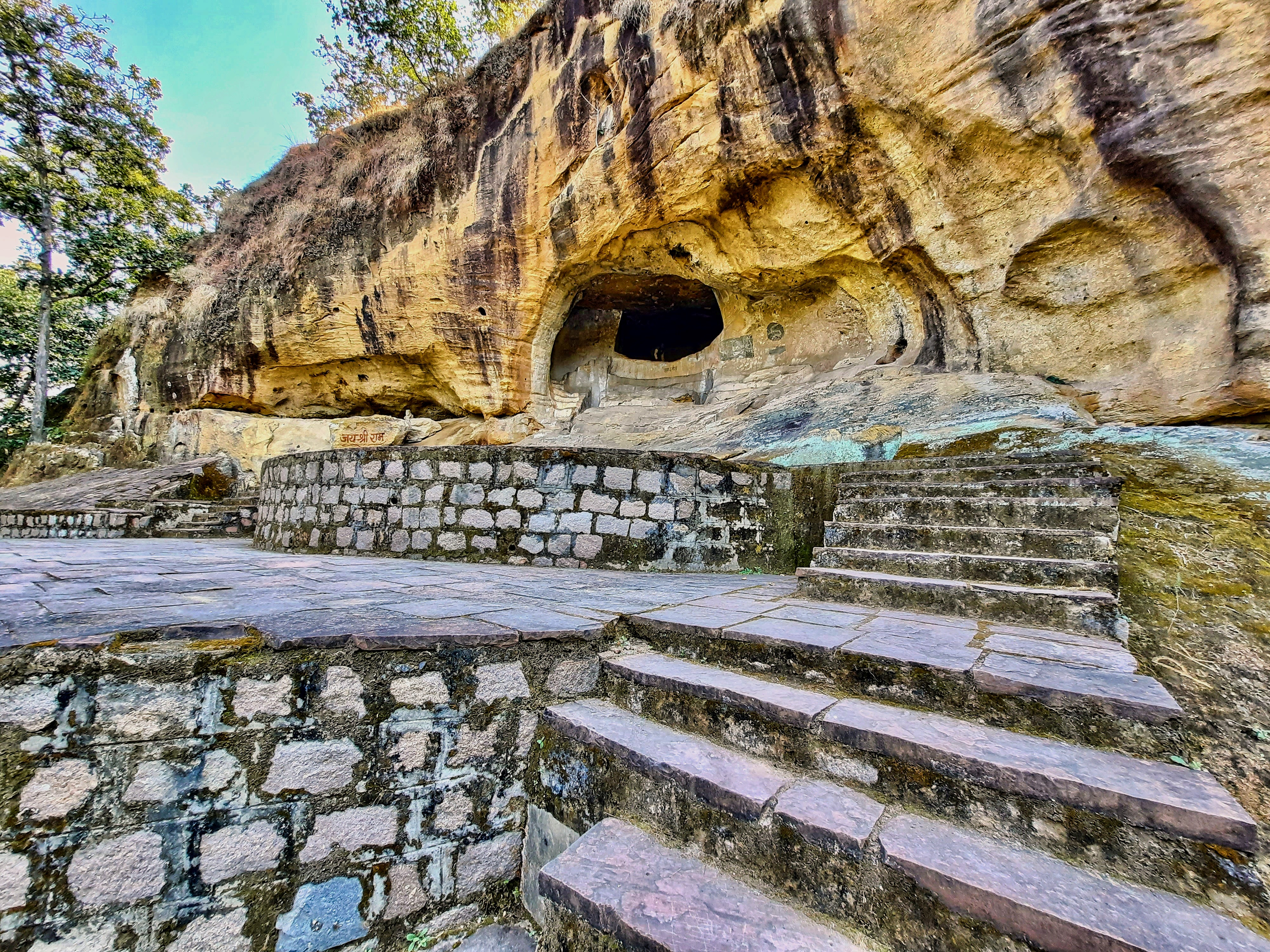
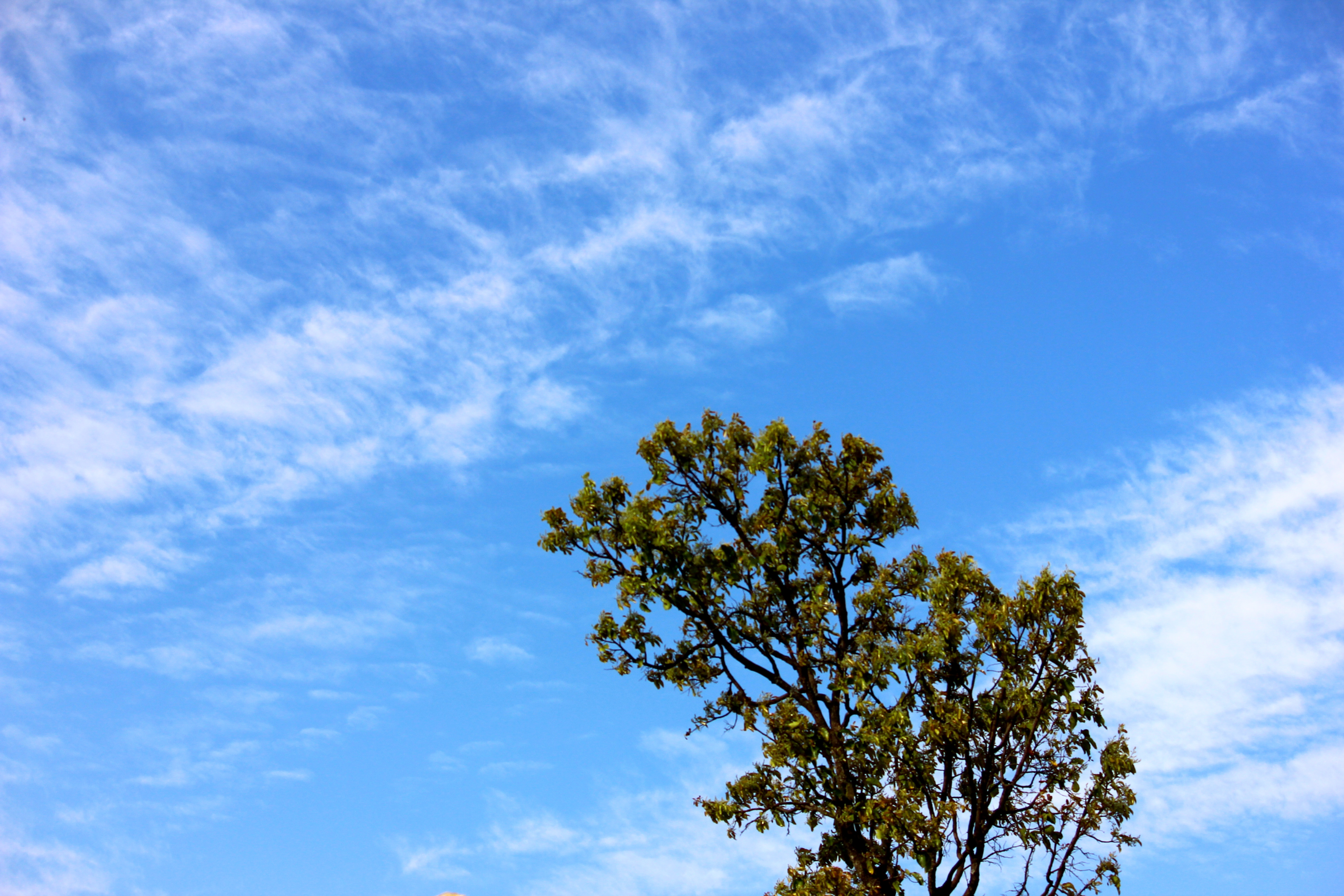
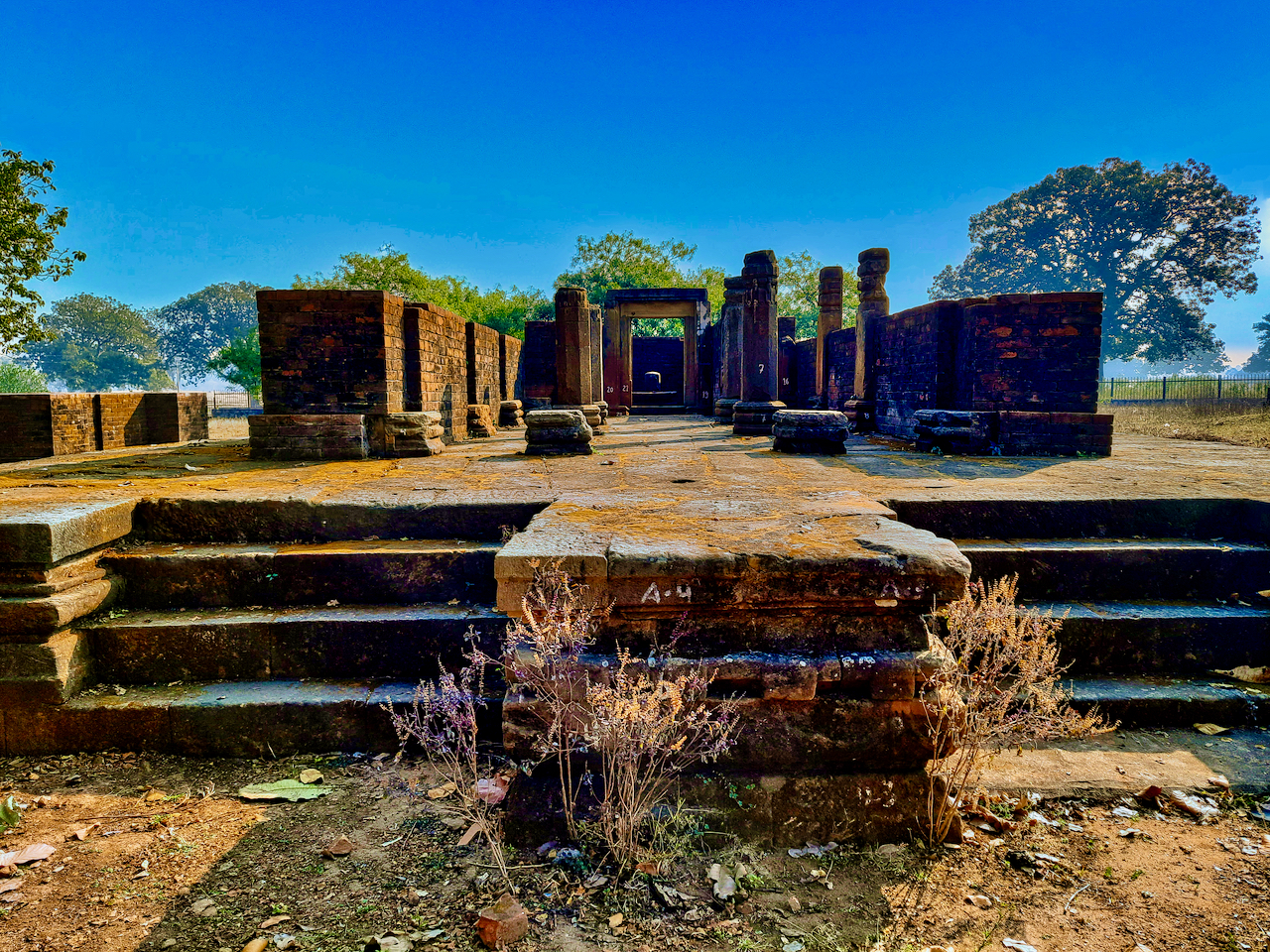
- Jogimara and Sitabenga Caves, Mainpat Hill Station, Satmahala ancient Mandir

- Location in Chhattisgarh
- Country: India
- State: Chhattisgarh
- Headquarters: Ambikapur

Area
  - Total: 5,732 km^{2} (2,213 sq mi)

Population (2011)
  - Total: 840,352
  - Density: 146.6/km^{2} (379.7/sq mi)

Demographics
  - Literacy: 61.16
  - Sex ratio: 991
- Time zone: UTC+05:30 (IST)
- PIN: 497xxx (Surguja)
- Vehicle registration: CG-15
- Website: surguja.nic.in

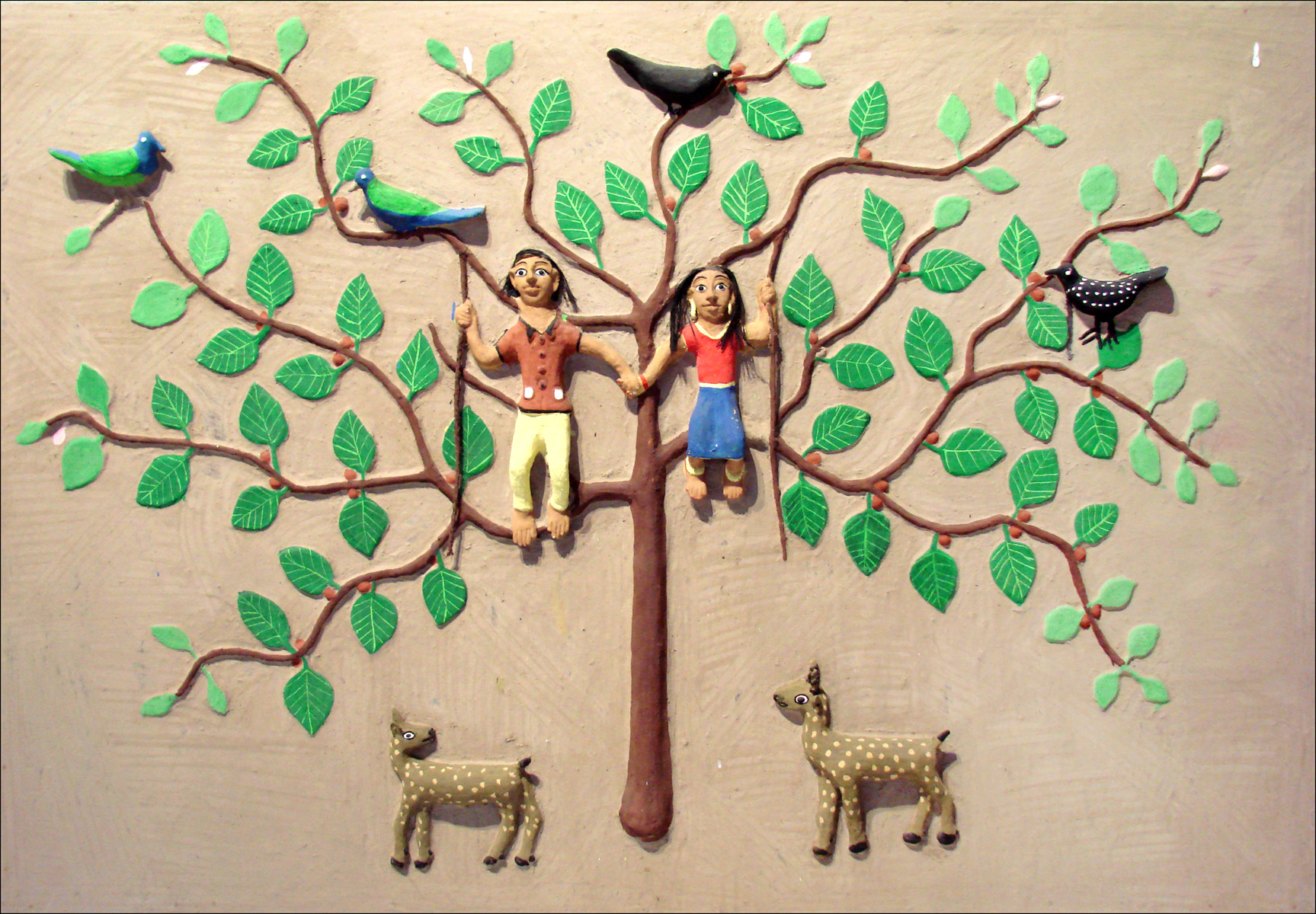
Adivasi decorative clay figures of Surguja district at the Quai Branly Museum, Paris

Surguja district is a district of the Indian state of Chhattisgarh. The district is one of the oldest districts of Chhattisgarh. The headquarters of the district is Ambikapur.

The district lies in its eponymous Surguja dialectal region (where Surgujia is spoken) and is to the east of the Vindhyachal-Baghelkhand region of peninsular India.

The district spread over a vast mountainous area inhabited by many different people groups such as the Gond, Bhumij, Oraon, Panika, Korwa, Bhuiya, Kharwar, Munda, Chero, Rajwar, Nagesia, Kanwar and Santal.

== History ==
According to legend, Lord Rama had visited Surguja during his 14 years of exile into the forests. There are many places in connection to epic of Ramayana, which are named after Lord Rama, Laxmana and Goddess Sita such as Ramgarh, Sita-Bhengra and Laxmangarh.

Prior to the arrival of the Mauryas, the area was ruled by the Nandas. In the third century BC the region was divided into tiny kingdoms. In 1613, a Rajput king belonging to the Rakshal clan attacked from Palamu in what is now Jharkhand, and took control of the area. In 1753, the Marathas invaded Surguja and forced the king to become a vassal. After the Third Anglo-Maratha War in 1818, the British gained control of the three princely states of Surguja, Koriya and Changbhakar. In 1820, Amar Singh was crowned as Maharaja. During the British Raj period, Surguja State was a princely state.

In 1951, Surguja became part of the new state of Madhya Pradesh. In 2000, it was one of the districts in the new state of Chhattisgarh.

== Geography ==
It lies between 23°37'25" to 24°6'17" north latitude and 81°34'40" to 84°4'40" east longitude. 244.62 kilometres (152.00 mi) long east to west and 67.37 kilometres (41.86 mi) broad north to south, this land has as area of about 5,732 square kilometres (2,213 sq mi).

The high-lands of Surguja district have peculiar 'pat formations' that highlands with small tablelands. The Mainpat, the Jarang pat, the Jonka pat, the Jamira pat and the Lahsunpat are the major parts of the district. The average height of area is above 600 metres (2,000 ft). Some of the peaks are Mailan 1,226 metres (4,022 ft), Jam 1,166 metres (3,825 ft), Parta Gharsa 1,159 metres (3,802 ft), Kanda Dara 1,149 metres (3,770 ft), Chutai 1,131 metres (3,711 ft), and Karo 1,105 metres (3,625 ft). There are a number of other peaks. North–west Surguja is hilly in nature, and moving westwards, three distinct steps may be marked out: the first from Shrinagar on the east to the low-lands of Patna and Kharsawan, the second from thence to the uplands around Sonhat and the third beyond Sonhat to above a height of 1,033 metres (3,389 ft). Central Surguja is a low basin through which the Rihand and its tributaries flow.

The soil of the Surguja District can be broadly classified into four major types: red and yellow soils, alluvial soils, laterite soils, and medium blue soils.

Red and yellow soils are derived from the parent rocks of the Gondwana System including sedimentary rocks. They are formed in-situ from the erosion of such rocks caused by rain. This soil is found particularly in east Sitapur, south Ambikapur, central Surajpur and Pratappur blocks. The red color is due to wide diffusion of iron while hydration of ferric oxide results in a yellow color in the soil. This soil is of lighter texture and has a porous and friable structure. Soluble salt is found in small quantities. Lime, kankar and free kankar are totally absent. These soils are poor in potash, nitrogen, humus and carbonate and differ greatly in consistency, color, depth and fertility. On the uplands they are thin and gravelly, sandy, porous and light coloured alluvium, generally transported from elsewhere, are found along river banks in alternate layers of sand and silt in East Ramanujganj, North Ambikapur, and Surajpur, along the river banks of the Rihand, Kanhar, and the Hasdeo rivers and their major tributaries. The colour of the soil is not uniform but varies from yellow to grey. Laterite soils are well developed on the summits of the plateau regions of Samri and Sitapur tehsil including Shankargargh, Kusmi, Sitapur, Batoli and Mainpat blocks of Mainpat, Jamirapat, Lahsunpat and Jonkpat.

There are three river basins in Surguja district, those of the Hasdeo River, the Rihand River and the Kanhar River.

In winters temperature dips to below 5 °C (41 °F) and in summers it rises above 46 °C (115 °F).

== Administration ==
Surguja district is divided into 7 tehsils:

- Ambikapur
- Lakhanpur
- Udaipur
- Dhourpur (Sub tehsil Lundra and Raghunathpur)
- Batauli
- Sitapur
- Mainpat

== Transport ==
The District Headquarters of Sarguja is Ambikapur City. It is also the administrative headquarter of Sarguja Division. Ambikapur is connected with Rail, Road and Air transport.

=== Rail ===
Ambikapur Railway Station is connected to the Anuppur railway junction, a bordering town in Madhya Pradesh, by a broad gauge railway. Trains reach Ambikapur from Delhi, Katni, Satna, Jabalpur, Durg, Bhopal and the state capital Raipur. More destinations, can be reached from Anuppur railway junction.

=== Road ===
Ambikapur is well connected by road to other major cities of Chhattisgarh such as Raipur, Bilaspur, Durg, Bhilai, Korba and Raigarh. Daily bus services also runs for Varanasi, prayagraj, Renukoot in U.P (170 km), Raipur (345 km) and Garhwa in Jharkhand, Aurangabad in Bihar. Bus services from Anuppur to Ambikapur operate via Manendragarh and Surajpur.

=== Air ===
Ambikapur Airport, now Maa Mahamaya Airport, is located at Darima, 12 km (7.5 mi) south of Ambikapur. The airport up-gradation work was finished in May 2023 at a cost of Rs. 48 crore from category 2C to 3C, to enable operations of 70-72 seater aircraft under UDAN Scheme. Making this the fourth public serving airport in Chhattisgarh after Raipur, Jagdalpur and Bilaspur. The airport is not functional at the moment.

== Agriculture ==
About 90% of the working population depends on agriculture, in which 50.36% of working population are of cultivated and about 12.77% of the region are agriculture labourers.

Agriculture is directly connected with land and water resources. In Surguja the percentage concentration of cultivated land is maximum in central zone of the district stretching east to west direction. North and south of this one the percentage of concentration decreases, because of several factors, out of them here are two major factors.

The uplands and high lands are mostly covered with rocky wastelands, infertile soil, woods and scrubs, sloppy and forested area.

Unavailability of water for irrigation over most of area, improper drainage difficulty in digging wells due to rocky basement, undeveloped means of communication, transportation have restricted the extension of cultivated land.

On the other hand, the central surguja is relatively level and has fertile soils, some water is available for irrigation in various ways, and a means of communication is developed.

Double cropped area is generally associated with water supply, natural or artificial and the pressure of population. Wherever the physical condition permits and the pressure more over the land, two crops are raised in a year from the same field. As result, a particular pattern of use of land resources emerges, which helps in the delineation of planning regions on the basis of present available resources and the limit of their utilisation. Of course there is no uniformity in the distribution of double cropped area, but the study of its distribution will be of use in the need as well as the resources. Thus most of the concentration is to be found in two patches:

- Ramanujnagar block
- Ambikapur & Central North-East of Lundra, Rajpur, Shankargarh, Wadragnagar and Pratappur blocks

Almost the whole of the central plain has medium to relatively high value, with few exception due to local condition. In this part during summer most of the area remains uncultivated. Only in Ambiakpur block here is some concentration of double cropped area due to irrigation facilities. The per capita land is declining due to the increasing in rural population which can be fed by increasing the per acre output through bringing more and more cultivated land under double cropped system, by extending irrigation facilities, using better fertilizers and better culture.

The assessment of physical condition for different crops helps in arranging them so as to derive the optimum return of it, which may be done through the study of their distribution along with the average production. The production of land provided to different crops depends upon physically suitability of soil and availability of water etc. Not only this the local needs is also important in this connection. Roughly 41.67% out of the total geographical area is under cultivation.

== Demographics ==
According to the 2011 census Surguja district has a population of 2,359,886, roughly equal to the nation of Latvia or the US state of New Mexico. This gives it a ranking of 192nd in India (out of a total of 640). The district has a population density of 150 inhabitants per square kilometre (390/sq mi). Its population growth rate over the decade 2001-2011 was 19.74%. Surguja has a sex ratio of 976 females for every 1000 males, and a literacy rate of 61.16%.

The divided Surguja district has a population of 840,352, of which 136,702 (16.27%) live in urban areas. The divided district has a sex ratio of 980 females per 1000 males. Scheduled Castes and Scheduled Tribes make up 4.77% and 57.40% of the population respectively.

Religions in Surguja district (2011)
Religion	Percent
Hinduism	88.71%
Christianity	7.63%
Islam	3.06%
Other or not stated	0.60%

=== Languages ===
Languages of Surguja district (2011)
1. Surgujia (65.1%)
2. Kurukh (13.2%)
3. Hindi (11.8%)
4. Bhojpuri (2.71%)
5. Sadri (2.39%)
6. Chhattisgarhi (0.91%)
7. Odia (0.90%)
8. Others (2.99%)

At the time of the 2011 Census of India, 65.07% of the population in the district spoke Surgujia, 13.2% Kurukh, 11.83% Hindi, 2.71% Bhojpuri, 2.39% Sadri, 0.91% Chhattisgarhi and 0.90% Odia as their first language.

== Education ==
- Surguja University, Ambikapur
- Govt. Medical college, Ambikapur
- Govt. Nursing college, Ambikapur
- Govt. Engineering college, Ambikapur
- Govt. Polytechnic College, Ring road Ambikapur
- Govt. ITI college, M.G. road Ambikapur
- Rajiv Gandhi P.G. college, M.G.road Ambikapur( Govt.)
- Rajmohini devi girls P.G. college, Gaurav path Ambikapur (Govt.)
- Rajmohini devi agricultural science and research institute, Ajirma Ambikapur (Govt.)
- Govt.Multipurpose higher secondary school, Gudri chowk Ambikapur
- Central Govt.Sainik school, Mendrakala Ambikapur,

== Minerals ==
Mineral belts of Surguja:

- Upper catchments of river or Sitapur-Samri belt: This belt is associated with eastern and south eastern part of the district. It abounds in bauxite and some amount of coal.
- Central-north Surguja (Wadrafnagar-Pa-–Pratappur-Surajpur-Ambikapur) belt: The reserve of coal, pyritic minerals, sulphur, mica berylluiim, byerites, copper, and galena are reported. Bishrampur, Bhatgaon, Tatapani, Ramkola, Lakhanpur and Basen are the main coal fields. Some fire-clay, mica, coal, galena, and silmenite are also reported in Wadrafnagar near the Uttar Pradesh border.

In Surguja bauxite deposits have been found in tertiary rocks. Due to decay and weathering of aluminium rich rocks, felspar usually kaolinised under tropical monsoon conditions, the weathering goes a step further and results in a residue rich in hydroxides of aluminium together with oxides of iron, manganese and titanium with sufficient contraction of aluminium hydroxides, economic deposits of bauxite originates. This process of 'bauxitisation' as it is called thrives well on a topographically elevated well drained plateaus of low relief. The recoverable reserves of bauxite in Surguja is 57.54 million tonnes, which is around 57% of total state reserve.

Out of 57.74 million tonnes, 42.21 million tonnes are under proved category, 13.56 million tonnes under probable category and remaining 1.76 million tonnes under are possible category. About 51 million tonnes of the total reserves are of metallurgical grade and the grade particular of 6 million tonnes are not known.

The economical deposits are located at entire pat (local name given to plateau or pleatux) region of eastern and south eastern Surguja including Mainpat, Samari and Jamirapat.

- Mainpat: bauxite is of good and thickness varies from 4–5 meters.
- Jamirapat and Samripat

Bauxite deposits of these areas are metallurgical grade I. These two major reserves are centred in Samri tehsil and adjacent plateaus – Jamripat, Jaranpat, Lahsunpat, Jonkapat and other small hill rocks.

Most of the coal in the Gondwana is found in Barakar series. Coal as a solid stratified rock composed mainly of hydrocarbon and capable of being used as a fuel to supply heat or light or both. The coal fields of Surguja belongs to Gondwana coal fields. The coal of this area is of good quality stream and gas coals. The coal fields of Surguja can be classified as:

- Middle Gondwana Coal Fields: Tatapani-Ramkola, Jhilmili and Sonhat
- Talchir Coal Fields: Bisrampur, Bansar, Lakhanpur, Panchbhaini and Damha-munda
- Mahanadi Valley: Hasdo-Rampur

== Politics ==
Surguja district is part of Surguja (ST) Lok Sabha constituency. The assembly segments in Surguja district are: Lundra, Ambikapur and Sitapur. Lundra and Sitapur are reserved for Scheduled Tribes.

The current MLAs from Lundra, Ambikapur and Sitapur are prabodh minz, rajesh agarwal and ramkumar toppo respectively, all from the Indian National Congress. The MP for Surguja is chintamani maharaj from the Bharatiya Janata Party.

== Geographical indication ==
Jeeraphool rice was awarded the Geographical Indication (GI) status tag from the Geographical Indications Registry, under the Union Government of India, on 14 March 2019 and is valid until 14 February 2028.

Jaivik Krishi Utpadak Sahkari Samiti Maryadit from Batauli, proposed the GI registration of Jeeraphool rice. After filing the application in February 2018, the rice was granted the GI tag in 2019 by the Geographical Indication Registry in Chennai, making the name "Jeeraphool" exclusive to the rice grown in the region. It thus became the first rice variety from Chhattisgarh before Nagri Dubraj rice and the 6th type of goods from Chhattisgarh to earn the GI tag respectively.

The GI tag protects the rice from illegal selling and marketing, and gives it legal protection and a unique identity.

== See also ==
- Balrampur district, Chhattisgarh
- Surajpur district
- Ambikapur
