= Balrampur, Chhattisgarh =

Balrampur
- Town
- Location in Chhattisgarh, India Balrampur (India)
- Coordinates: 23.605°N 83.617°E
- Country: India
- State: Chhattisgarh
- District: Balrampur

Population (2011)
  - Total: 4,456

Languages
  - Official: Hindi, Surgujiha
- Time zone: UTC+5:30 (IST)
- PIN: 497119
- Telephone code: 07831
- Vehicle registration: CG-30
- Website: balrampur.gov.in

Balrampur is the headquarters of Balrampur-Ramanujganj district in the Indian state of Chhattisgarh. It is 441 km north of the state headquarters of Raipur. Not to be confused with Balrampur, a district in Uttar Pradesh.

== Geography ==
It is an important junction commecting Ambikapur, Ramanujganj, Kusmi, Pratappur and Rajpur. It has a tourist attraction Dipadah, remains of ancient civilisation.

== Facilities ==
- District Collectorate composite building (4 km from city in Ramanujganj road)
- State police training centre
- District hospital
- District Police Station & State Police Office Balrampur

== Transport ==
=== Road ===
Balrampur has collectorate of the district and well connected by all towns of district. National highway 343 connects to Garhwa Jharkhand and Ambikapur Chhattisgarh. Via Ramanujganj Garhwa Jharkhand is accessible. It is linked with Ambikapur, India Via Jhalaria → Rajpur → Baghima -> Ambikapur. The district is having mostly tribal population bordering with states of Jharkhand,Uttar Pradesh and Madhya Pradesh.

=== Rail ===
The nearest railway station are Ambikapur and Garhwa.

== See also ==
- Balrampur district, Chhattisgarh
- Ramanujganj
