= Wadrafnagar =

Wadrafnagar wadrafnagar
- Block
- Nickname: wadrafnagar
- Location in Chhattisgarh, India Wadrafnagar (India)
- Coordinates: 23.76°N 83.19°E
- Country: India
- State: Chhattisgarh
- District: Balrampur
- Block: Wadrafnagar
- Established: unknown
- Elevation: 489 m (1,604 ft)

Population
  - Total: 6,048 [according to 2,011]

Languages
  - Official: Chhattisgarhi, Hindi
- Time zone: UTC+5:30 (IST)
- PIN: 497225
- Vehicle registration: CG 30
- Website: https://wadrafnagar.com/

Wadrafnagar is one of the administrative blocks of Balrampur district, Chhattisgarh, India. It is very close to the borders of Jharkhand, Uttar Pradesh and Madhya Pradesh. The economy mostly is based on agriculture and forestry.

== River ==
- Kharhara River -

Kharhara River, away from Mahamaya Mandir. locals celebrate Chatt Pooja on the banks of river. There is also a temple situated known as Kharhara Temple.

- Rakasganda Waterfall -

The Rakasganda Fall is a tourist spot situated in Balrampur district, Chhattisgarh, India. Which is Rihand Besin on East Baghelkhand Pathar. This fall is on Rihand River, and is around 150.0 km (93.2 mi) from Ambikapur and around 60.0 km (37.3 mi) from Wadraf Nagar, which is a small city and tehsil[1] located amidst dense forest.

== See also ==
- Rakasganda
- Surguja State
