= Narsinghnath =

Nrusinghnath Temple
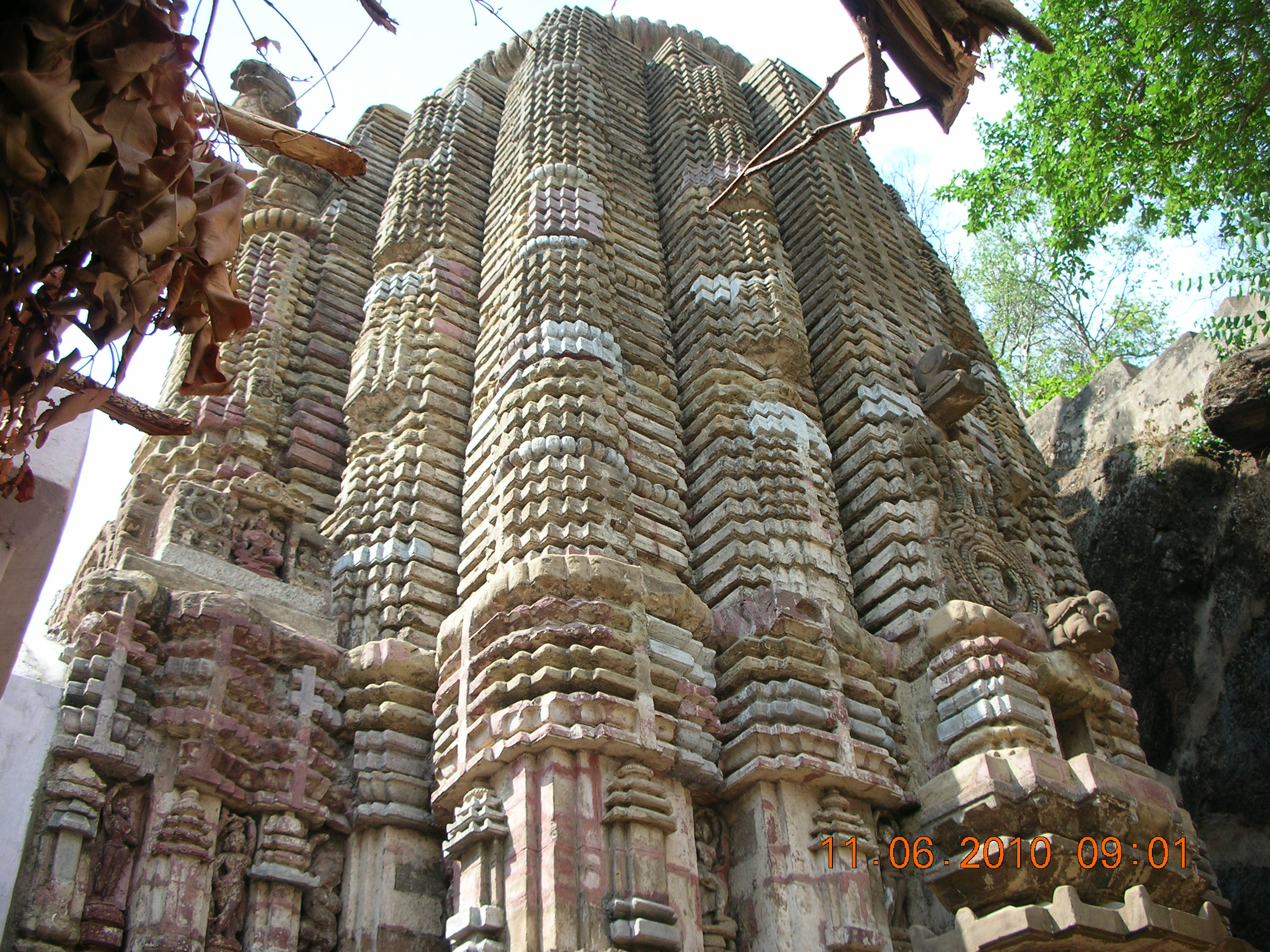
- Nru-siṃha-nāth Temple Shrine

Religion
- Affiliation: Hinduism
- District: Bargarh
- Deity: Narasimha

Location
- Location: Western Odisha
- State: Odisha
- Country: India
- Interactive map of Nrusinghnath Temple
- Coordinates: 21.28°N 84.39°E

Architecture
- Creator: King Baijala Deba
- Completed: 14th century

Nru-siṃha-nāth is a small village,3 km from Paikmal nearest town is Paikmal temple and tourist spot located in Bargarh District of Western Odisha.

== Significance ==
The word Narasimha means half-man and half-lion Nātha means owner or Lord. The half-woman-half-lion is called Sphinx in Egypt and Manticore in Persia. In Hindu culture, Nrusimha or Nara-Sinha is one of the 10 Avataras or Incarnations of god Vishnu.

== Image gallery ==
Some photographs of Gandhamardan Hills
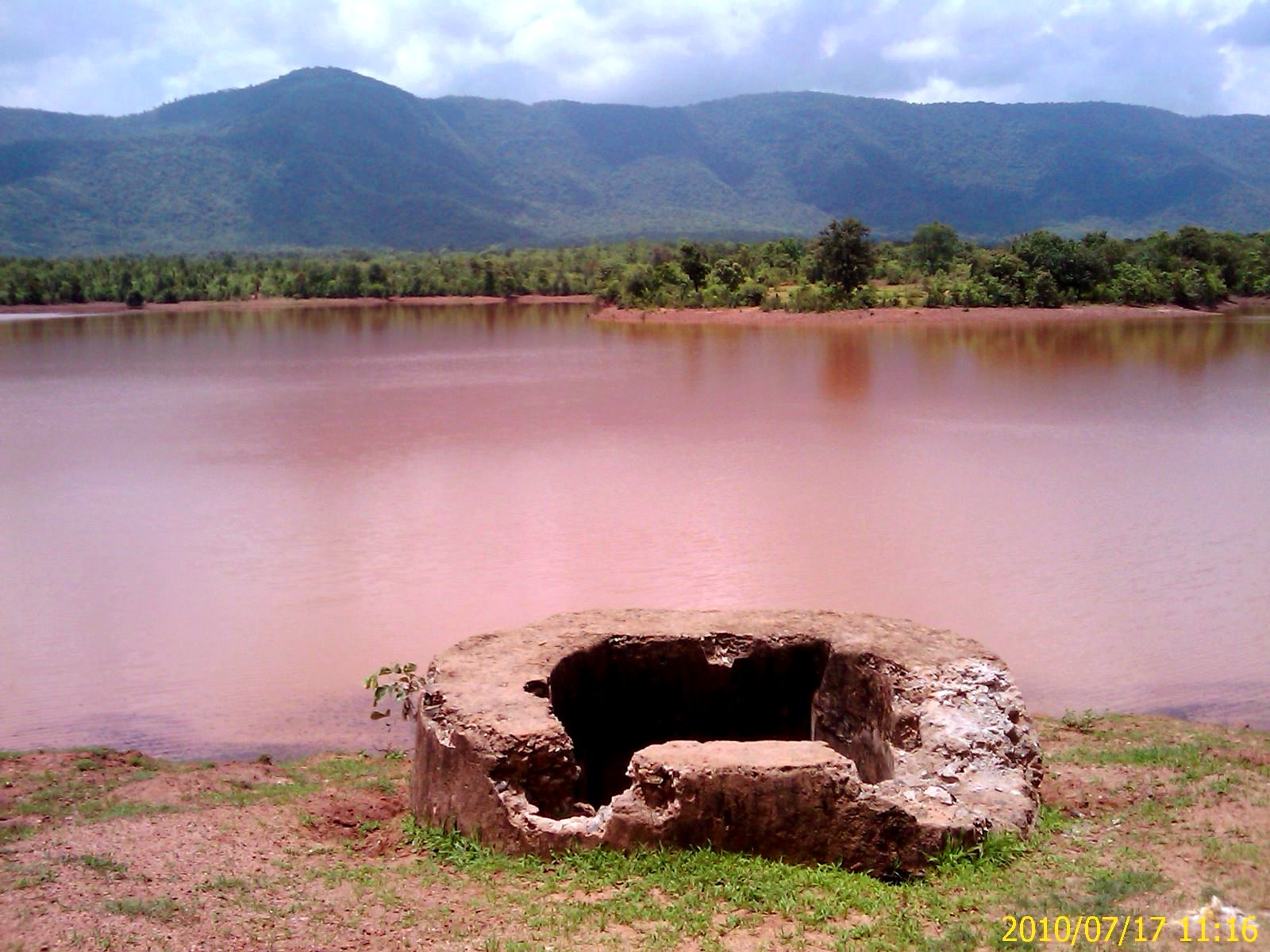
Gandhamardan Hills on backdrop of a Checkdam.

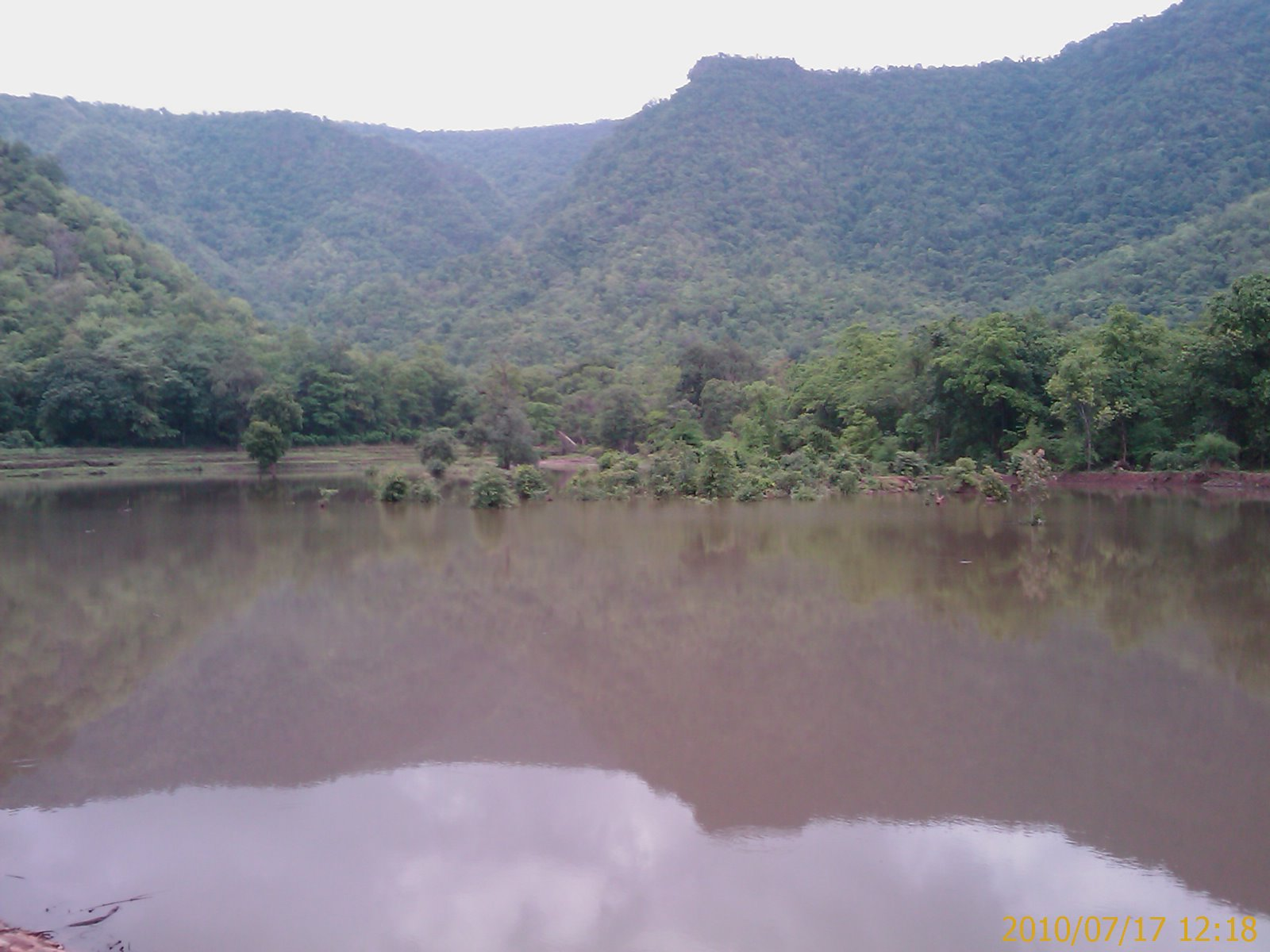
Gandhamardan Hills from another dam.

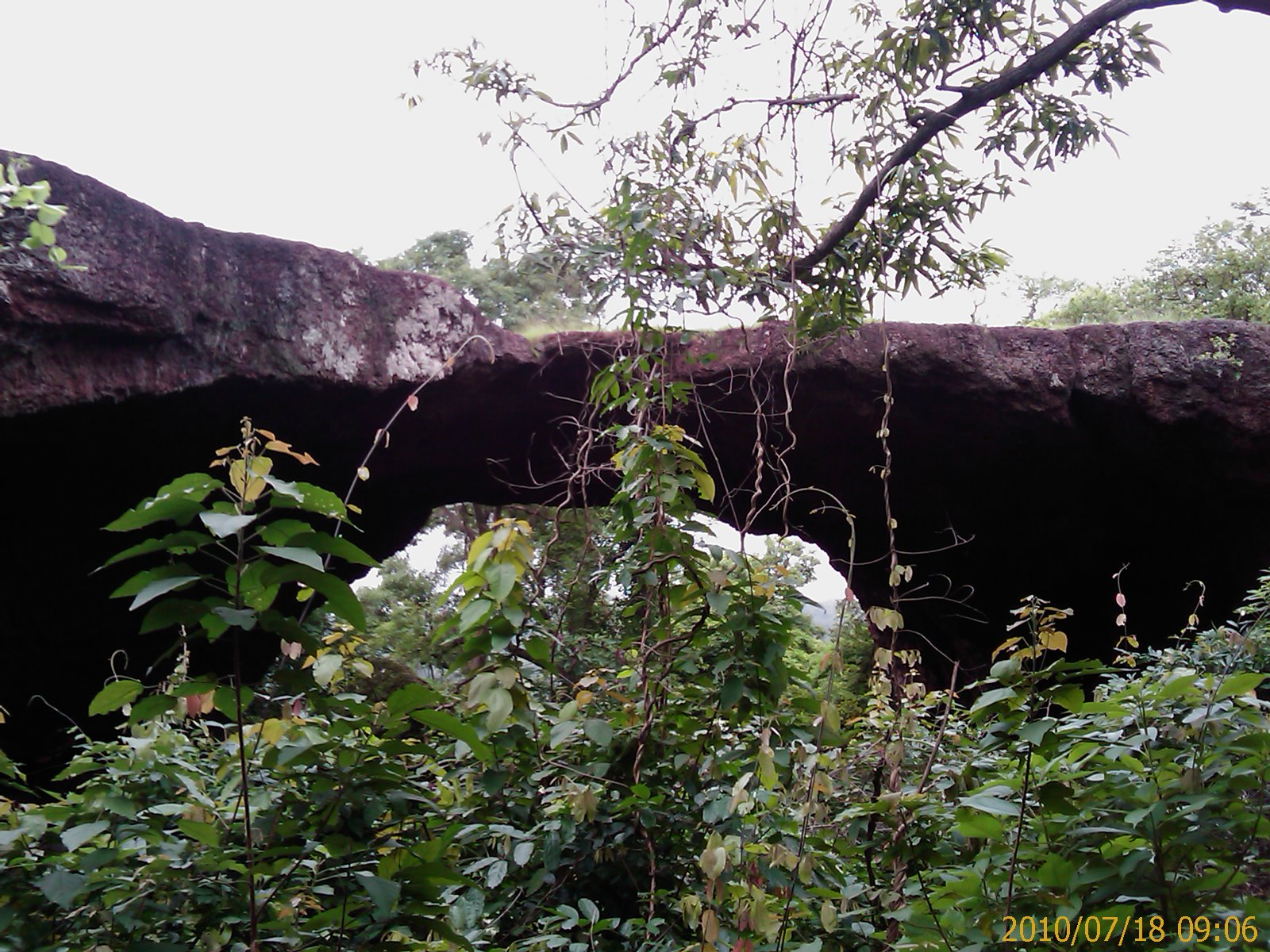
Bhimmado - the natural cave atop the hills

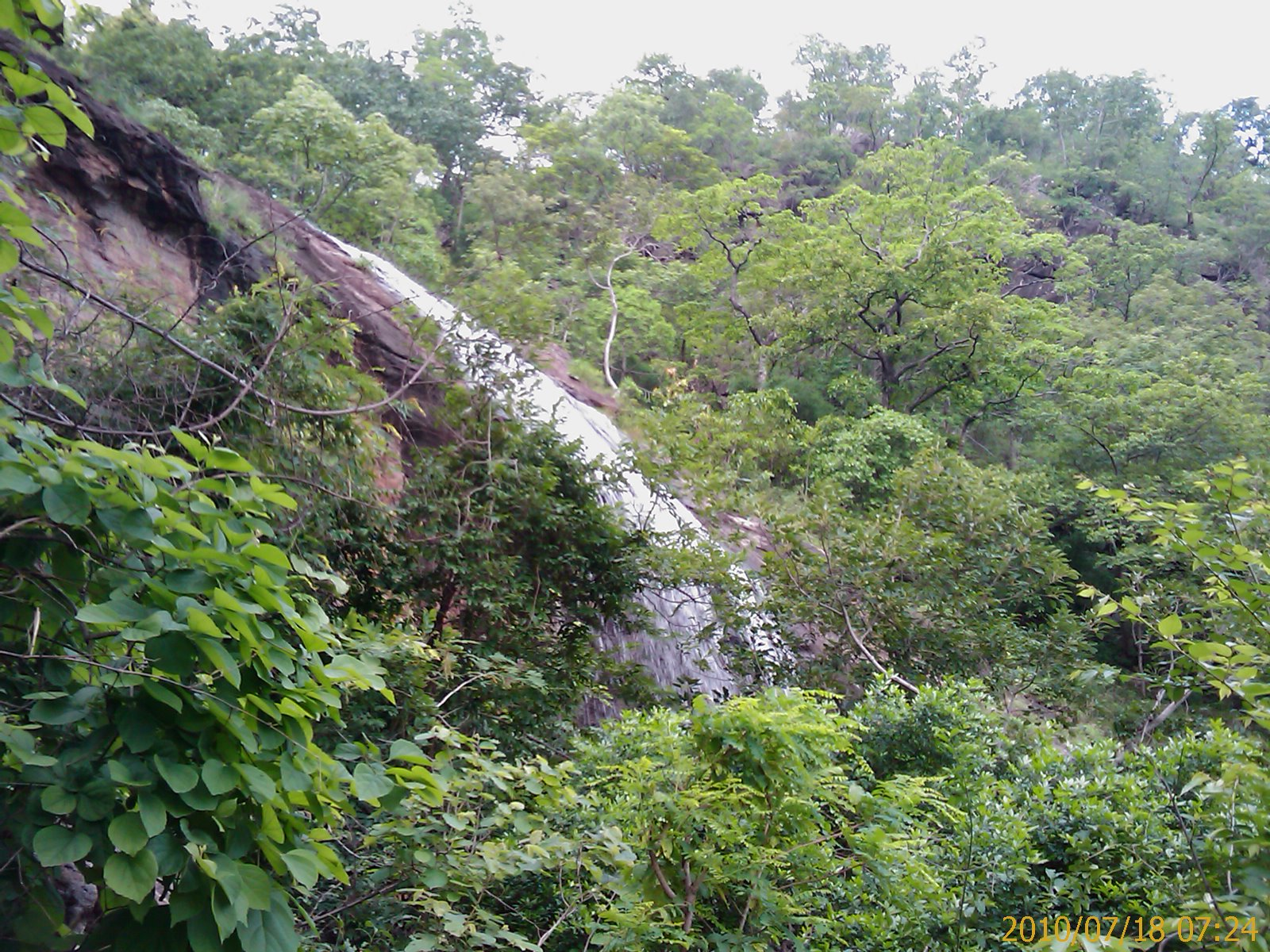
Kapildhar waterfall - side view

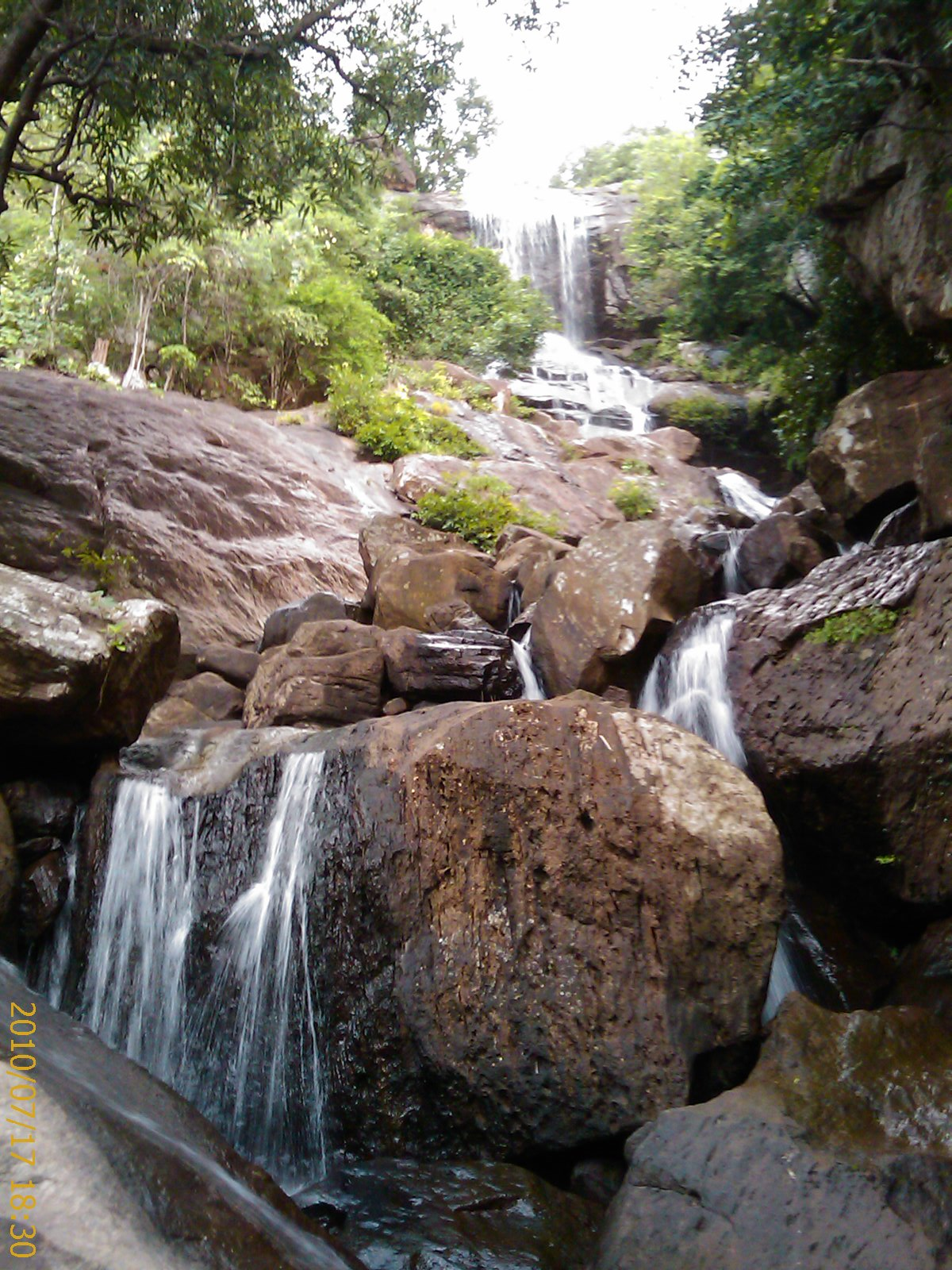
Kapildhar waterfall - front view

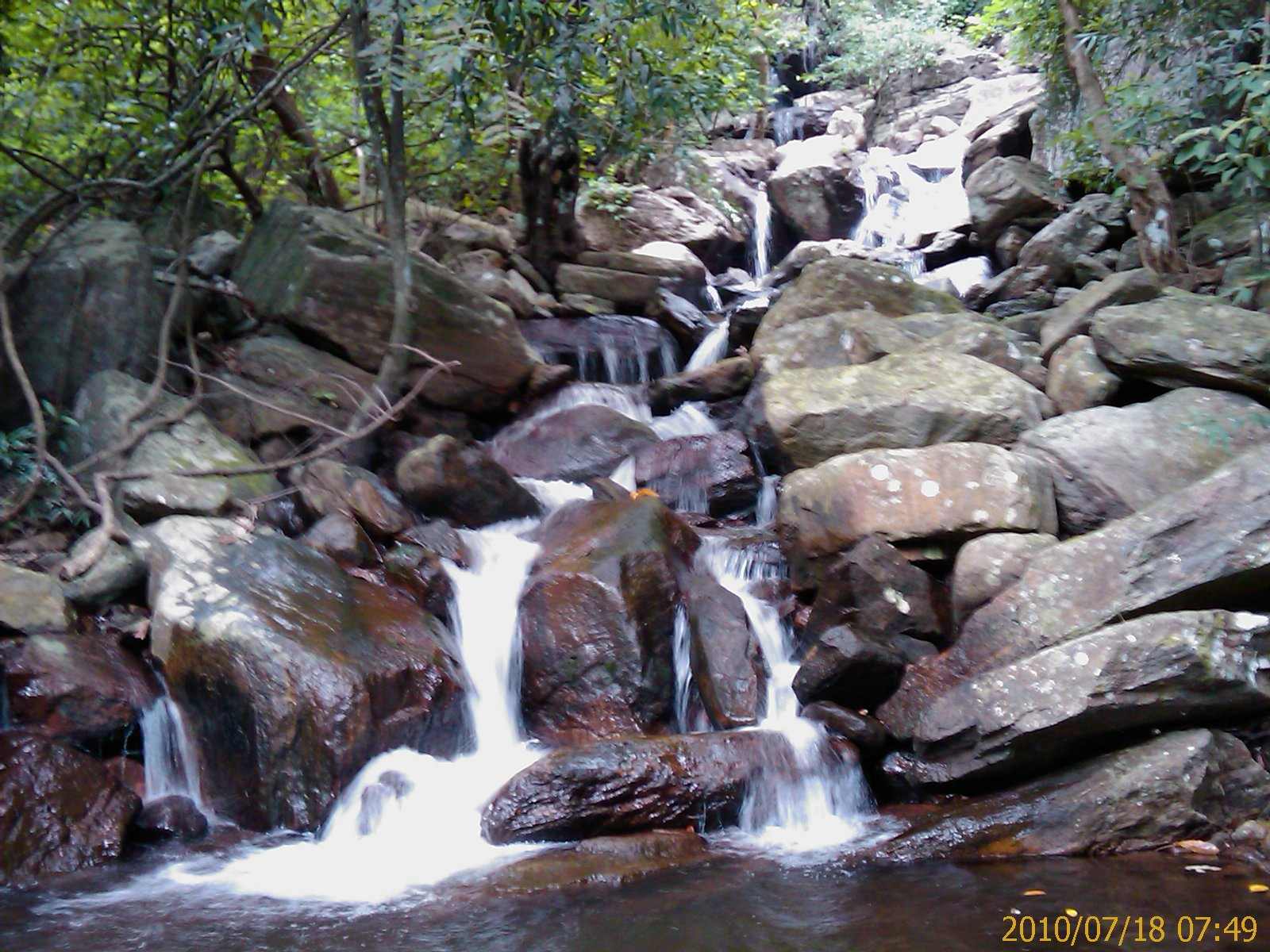
Unnamed waterfall on the hills

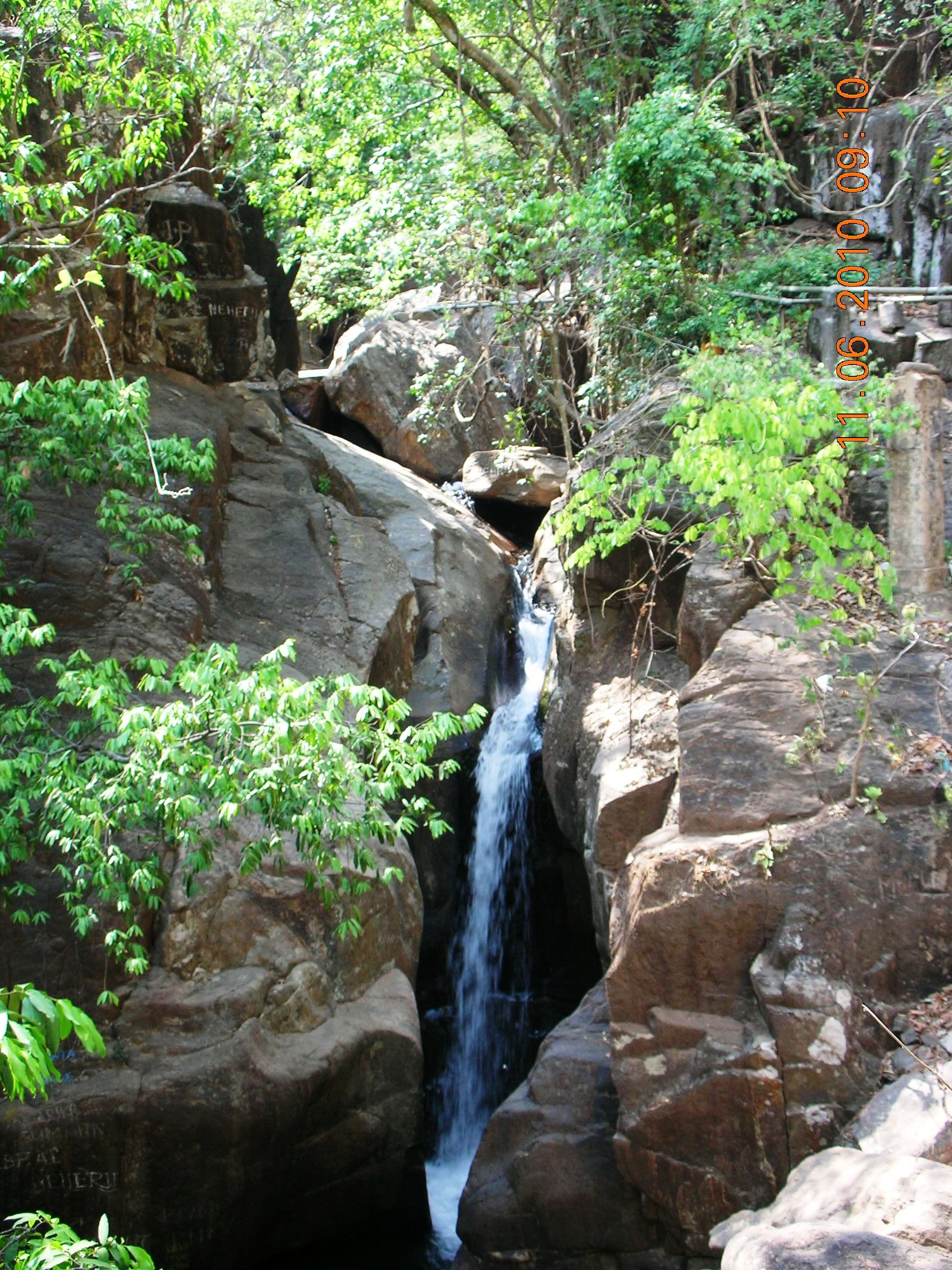
Bhimdhar waterfall

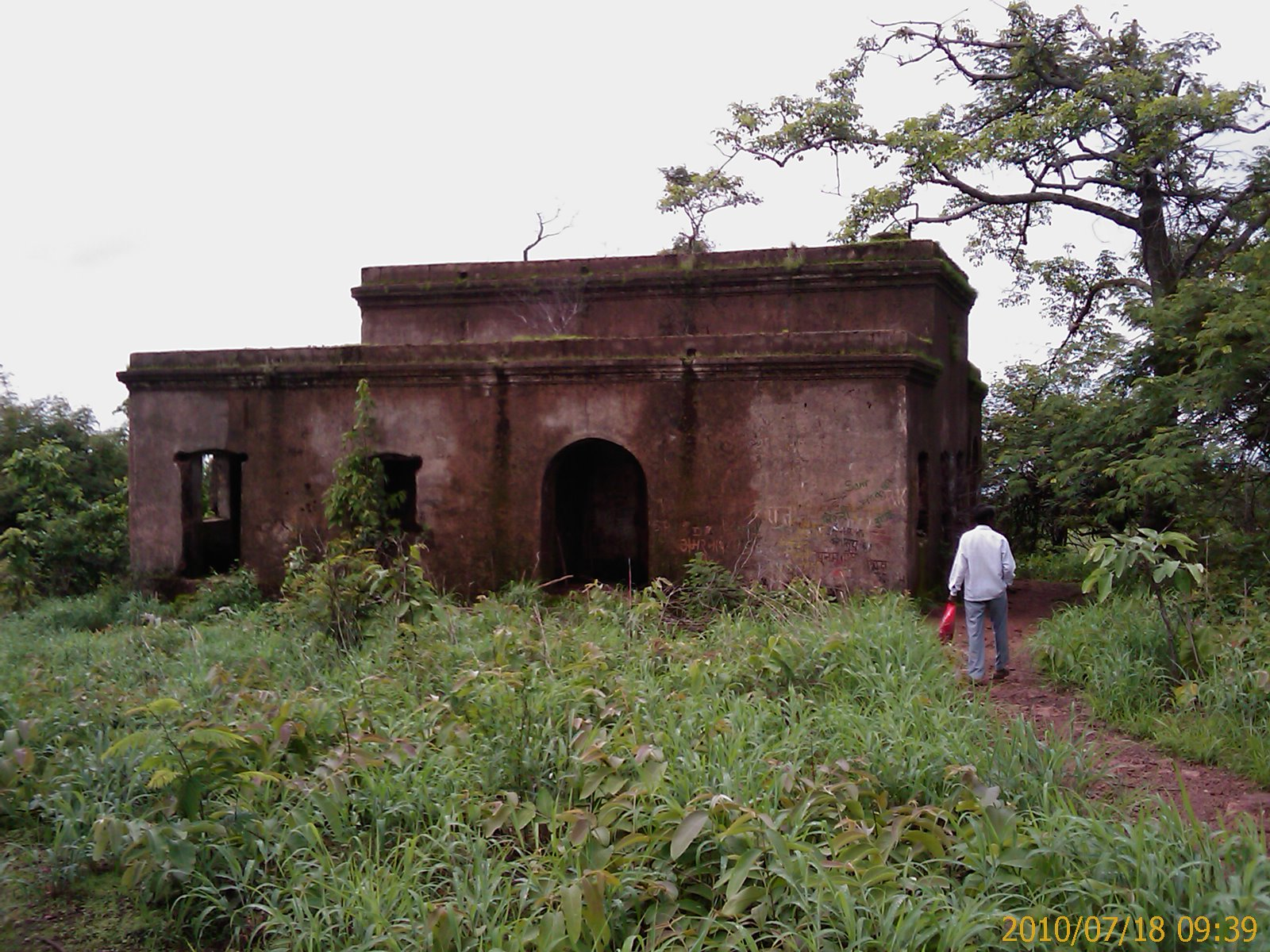
Ancient house on the hilltop

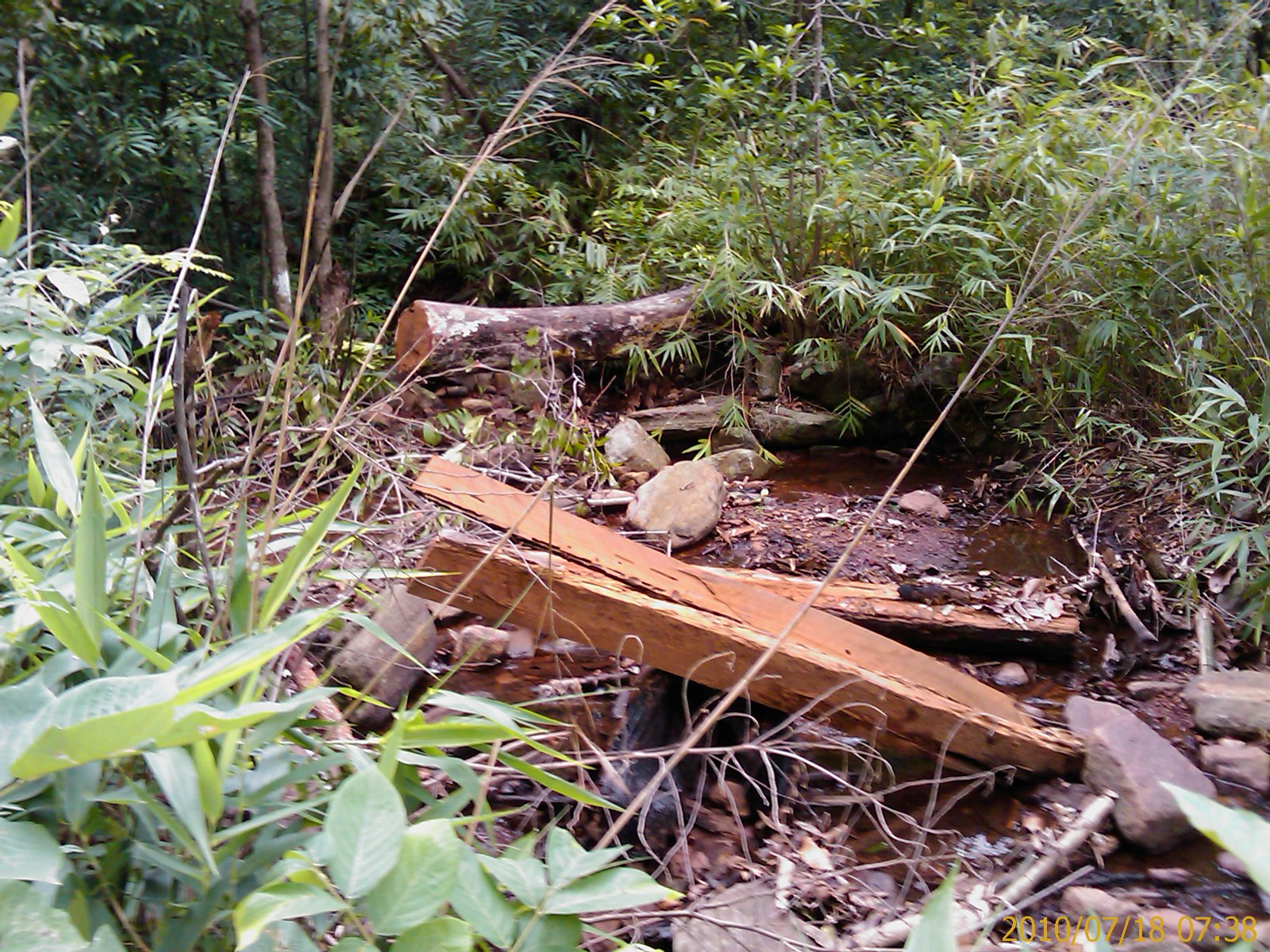
Forest theft/ Logging

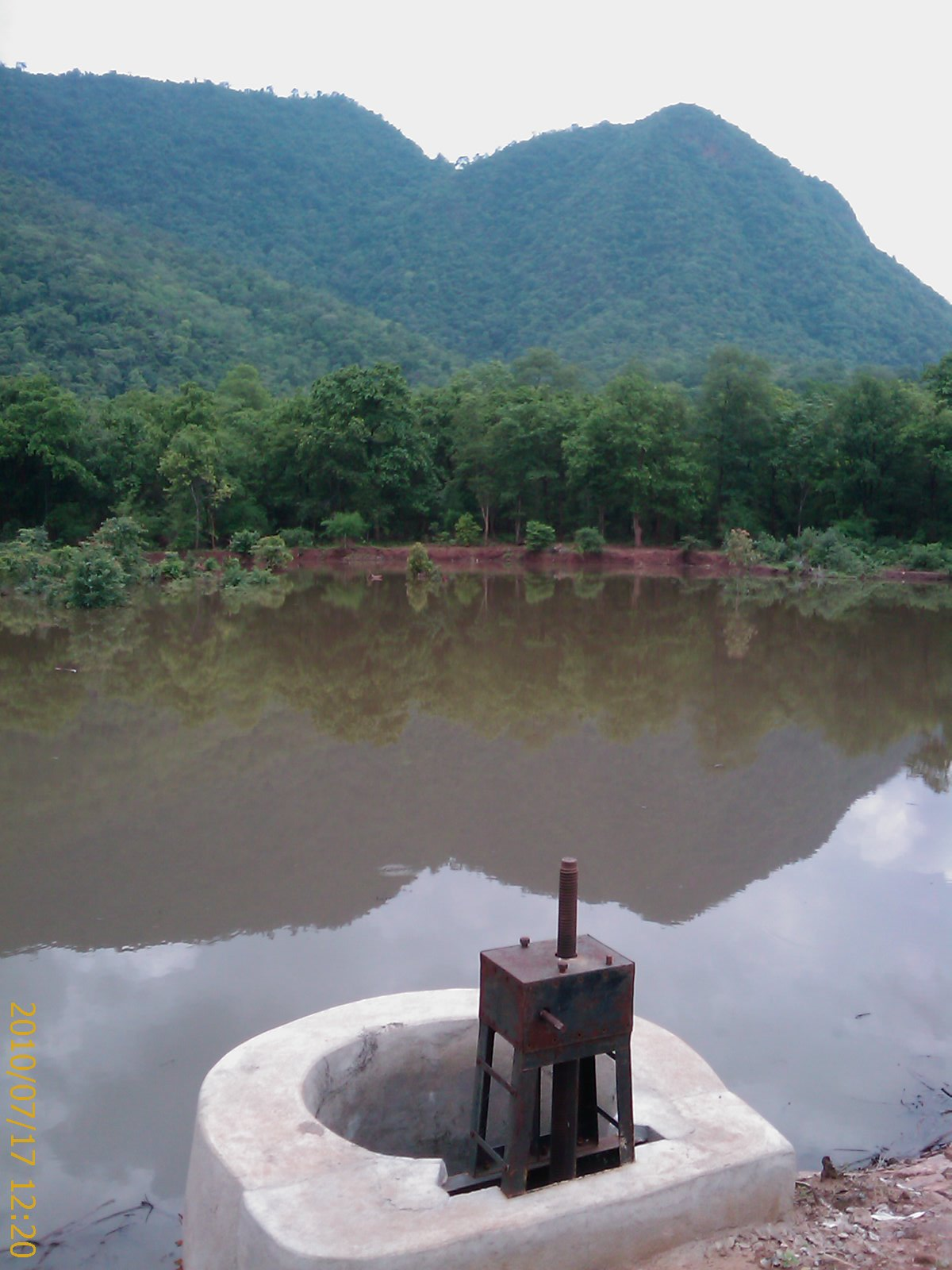
Southern side of Gandhamardan Range

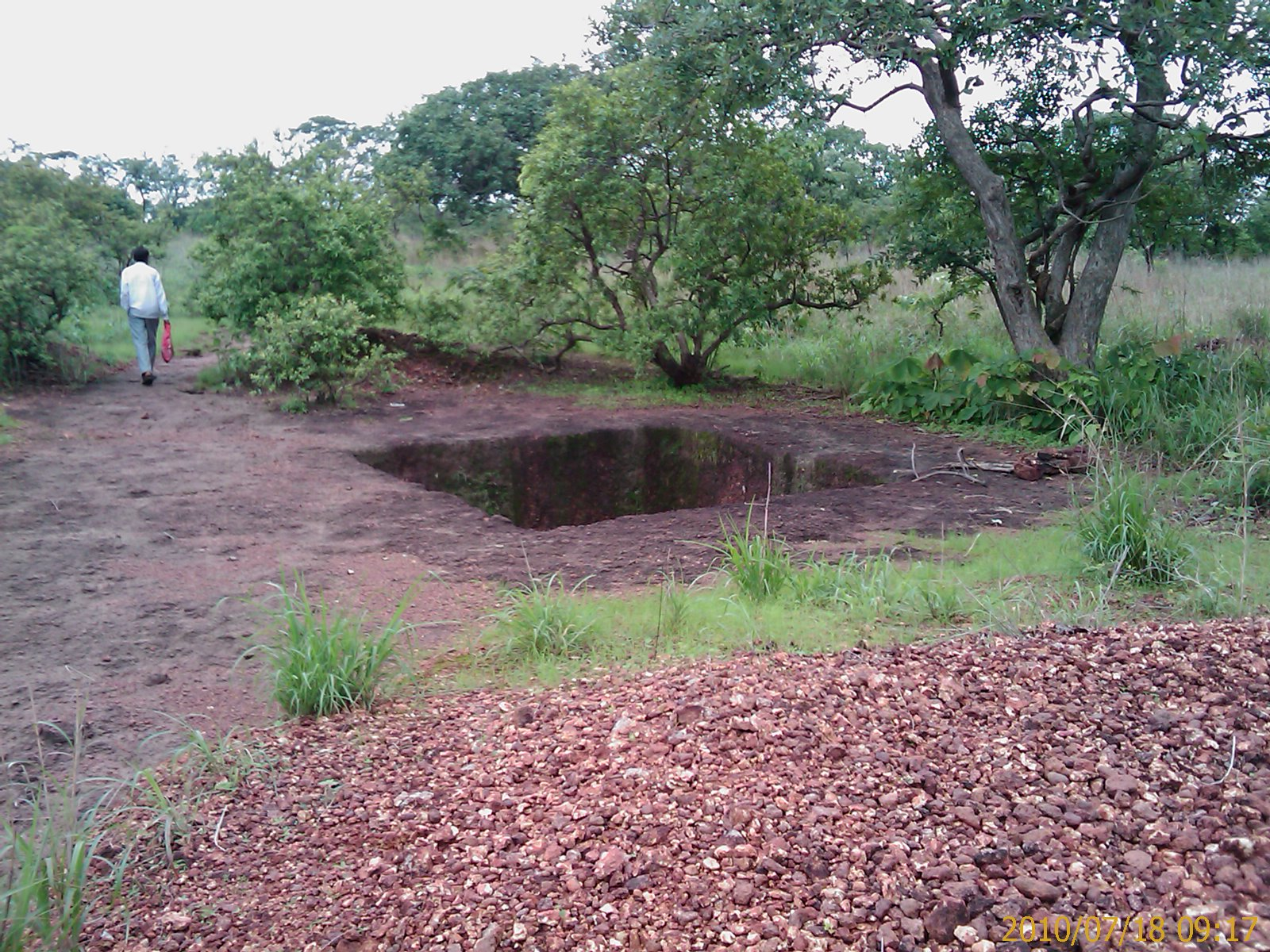
Gandhamardan Bauxite Test pit on hill top

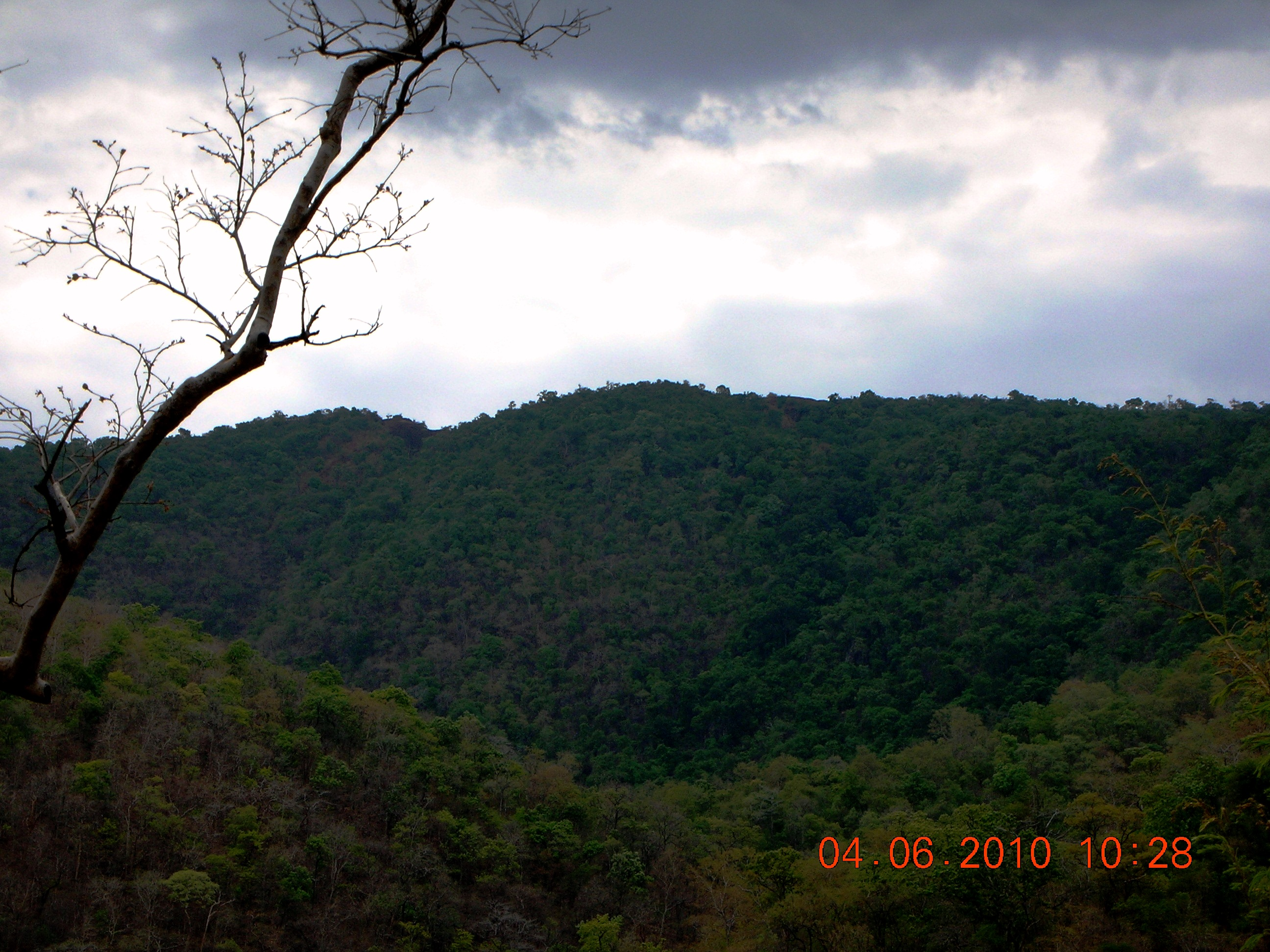
North Eastern View of the mountains

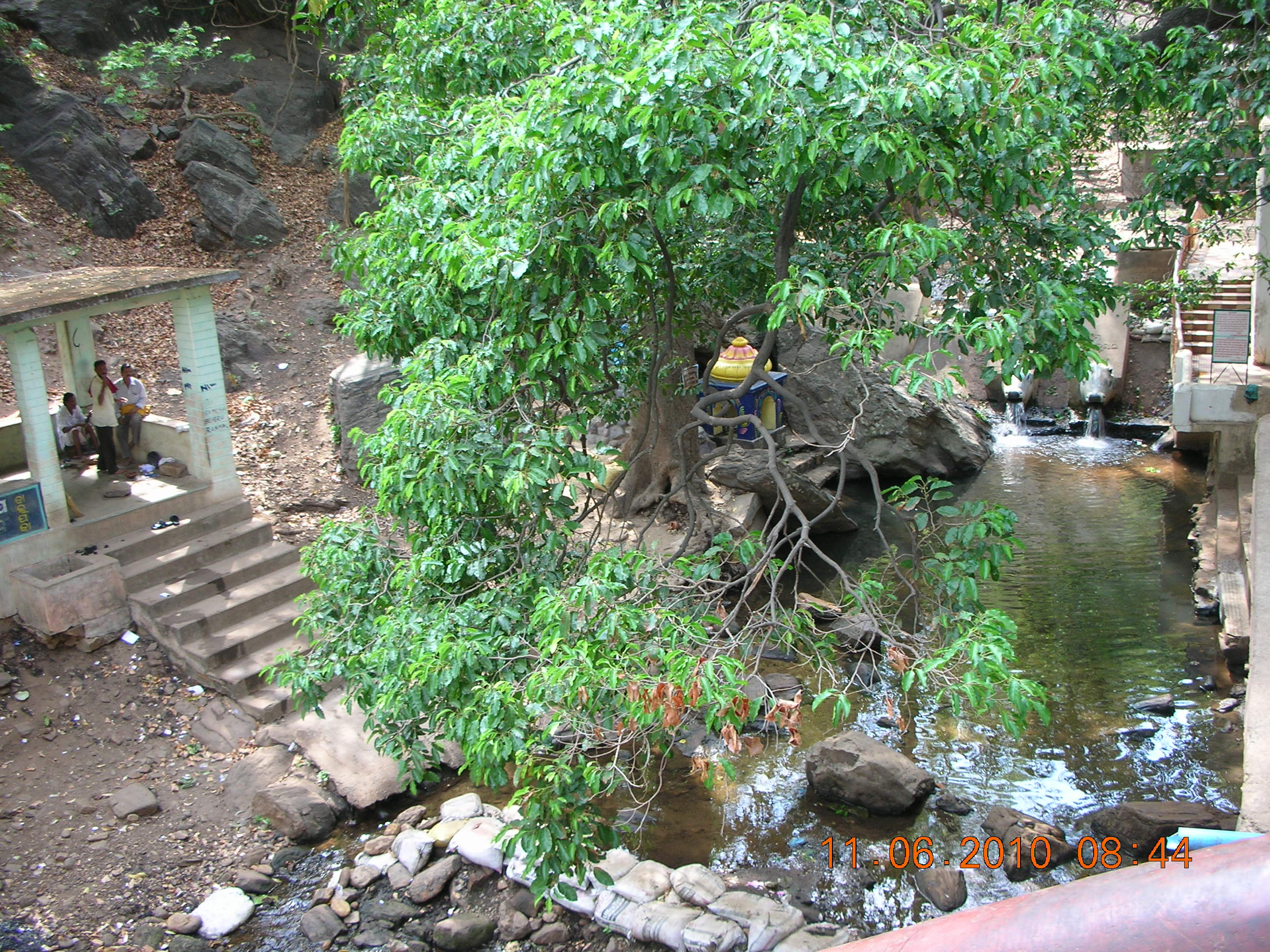
Gokund Ghaat or Paapa Nashini Ghat
