= Mainpat =

- Village
- Nickname: Shimla of Chhattisgarh
- Location in Chhattisgarh, India Mainpat (India)
- Coordinates: 22.837°N 83.315°E
- Country: India
- State: Chhattisgarh
- Elevation: 1,085 m (3,560 ft)

Languages
  - Official: Hindi, Chhattisgarhi
- Time zone: UTC+5:30 (IST)
- Vehicle registration: CG

Mainpat is a hill station and small village in the Surguja district in the northern part of the state of Chhattisgarh, India. It lies about 55 kilometres (34 mi) by road from the divisional headquarter of Ambikapur. The hill station is 50 km south of Ambikapur, 160 km northeast of Korba, and 360 km northeast of state capital Raipur.

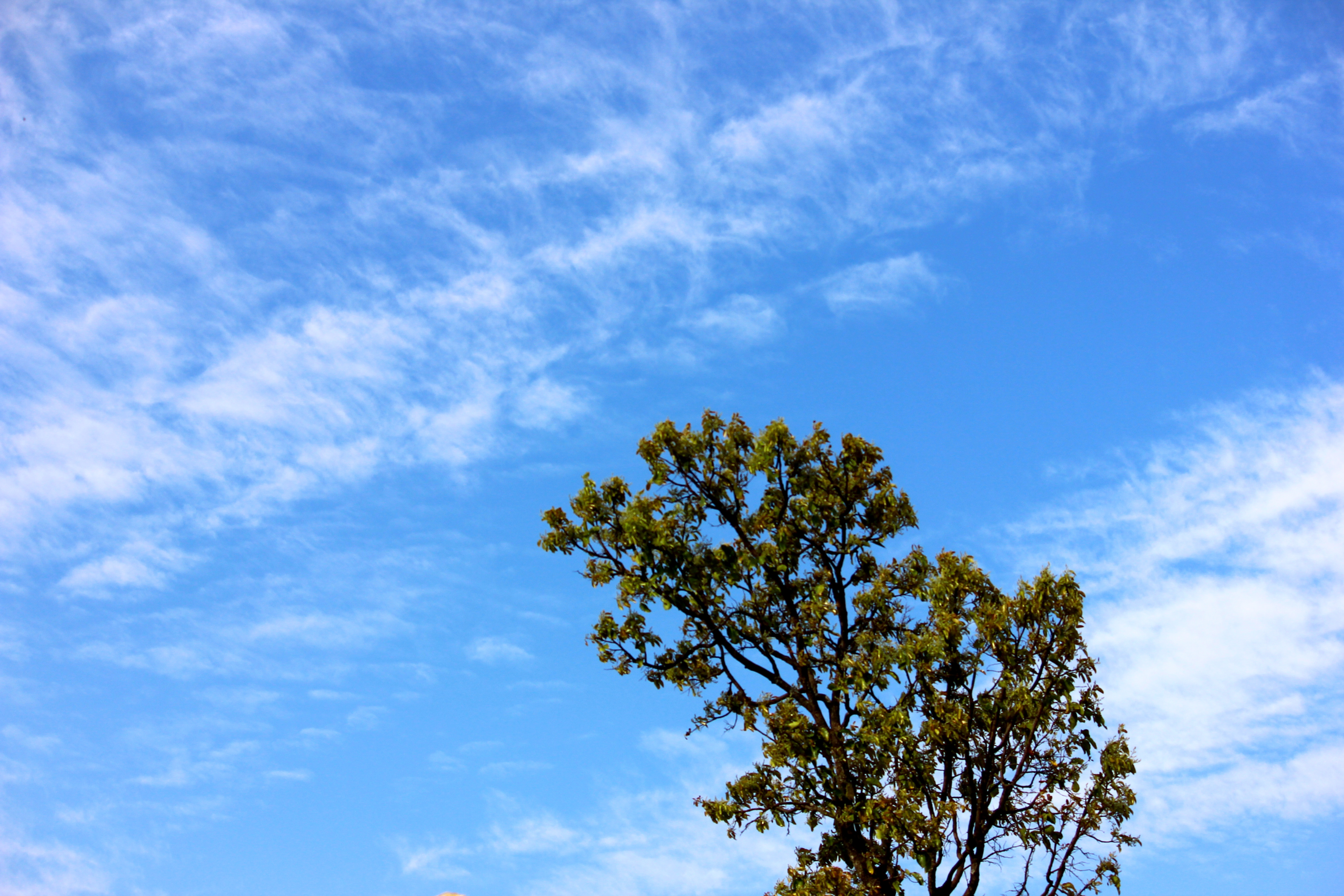
Mainpat Hill Station

This hill station is famous for the Ulta Pani or Bisar Paani which seems to defy the gravity and flows upward.

== Overview ==
Mainpat is known as the "Shimla/Swiss of Chhattisgarh" and is a popular tourist attraction. It is also home to a number of Tibetan religious exiles who worship at a temple dedicated to Buddha and manufacture designer mats as well as woolen cloth.

Recently, the village has developed infrastructure like roads and rest houses for travelers. Here one can easily find a lot of adventure sports like trekking, zorbing ball, rappelling, etc. Fields are covered with yellow and white crops.

There is a place in a village called Bisar Paani (5 km before Mainpat on the right side of the road going from Ambikapur to Mainpat) where water flows upstream. Villagers have made a canal for irrigation and water flows upward 30 ft on its own. No device and no scientific explanation could be found. The hill station features the Tiger Point Waterfall, Fish Point Waterfall, Ghaghi waterfall, Zalzali(bouncing land), Parpatiya Viewpoint and Buddha temples.

== History ==
In 1962-63, a lot of Tibetans migrated to India. The government of India allotted them land at Mainpat hill. The Home Ministry gave 3,000 acres of land to about 1,400 Tibetan immigrants. The village has traditionally been home to the Yadavs and tribes including the Manjhi.

== Gravity hill ==
Ulta Pani, also called Bisar Paani, is the place on this hill which is a gravity hill where due to the optical illusion the water seems to defy the gravity and seems to flow from bottom to uphill.

== Connectivity ==
=== By road ===
Nearest bus stand is Ambikapur Bus Terminal from where tourist vehicles can be booked

=== By Rail ===
Nearest Railway station is Ambikapur Railway station

=== By Air ===
Nearest Airport is Ambikapur Airport and is poised to get Air connectivity to Raipur & Varanasi

== See also ==
- Tourism in Chhattisgarh
