= Ramanujganj =

- Town
- Location in Chhattisgarh, India Ramanujganj (India)
- Coordinates: 23.80°N 83.70°E
- Country: India
- State: Chhattisgarh
- District: Balrampur-Ramanujganj district
- Elevation: 428 m (1,404 ft)

Population (2011)
  - Total: 13,692

Languages
  - Official: Hindi, Bhojpuri, Chhattisgarhi, Surgujia
- Time zone: UTC+5:30 (IST)
- PIN: 497220
- Area code: 07779
- Vehicle registration: CG-15, CG-30

Ramanujganj is a town in the Balrampur-Ramanujganj district of the Indian state of Chhattisgarh. Ramanujganj is the border town of Chhattishgarh-Jharkhand State. The nearest airports are Ranchi(250 km) and Raipur(350 km). The nearest railway stations are Garhwa(50km) and Ambikapur(110 km) . District sessions court and district jail is situated here as well as district polytechnic College. A CRPF battalion is based here for training and protection of district if need arises.

== Geography ==
Ramanujganj is located at 23.80°N 73.70°E. It has an average elevation of 428 m (1,404 ft).

== Demographics ==
As of 2011 India census, Ramanujganj had a population of 13,692. Males constitute 52% of the population and females 48%. Ramanujganj has an average literacy rate of 65%, higher than the national average of 59.5%: male literacy is 74%, and female literacy is 56%. In Ramanujganj, 17% of the population is under 6 years of age.

== Tourist attractions ==
The nearby tourist attractions are Tattapani (hot spring) 16 km away which hosts a yearly fair in the month of January. There is a temple named pahadi mandir situated on the nearby hill and a lake which is very popular among the local population for boat riding and the park nearby. Cheetal and neelgai park is being developed here. There is also a picnic spot called paltan ghat and baba ka dukan 3 km from the city known for its naturally carved rocks formed by the stream of river Kanhar. There are also many gardens, temples, and park.If you want tea and mixture then best place is Batul and Kalipath which is 4 km from bijli office.
