= Rakasganda =

The Rakasganda Fall is a tourist spot situated in Surajpur district, Chhattisgarh, India. This fall is on Rihand River, and it is around 150.0 km (93.2 miles) from Ambikapur and around 60.0 km (37.3 miles) from Wadraf Nagar, which is a small city and tehsil located amidst dense forest. Many transport buses are available, from Ambikapur and Wadraf Nagar, to reach Balangi, the last village before Rakasganda. From Balangi four-wheelers or two-wheelers can be hired to reach Rakasganda. The best time to see Rakasganda is around April – June.

== See also ==
- Surguja State
- Tourism in Chhattisgarh
