= Kusmi =

- Block
- Location in Chhattisgarh, India Kusmi (India)
- Coordinates: 23.28°N 83.90°E
- State: Chhattisgarh
- District: Balrampur
- Block: kusmi

Government
  - Type: Nagar Panchayat

Languages
  - Official: Hindi
- Time zone: UTC+5:30 (IST)
- PIN: 497224
- Vehicle registration: CG

Kusmi is one of the administrative blocks of the Balrampur district, Chhattisgarh in the Indian state of Chhattisgarh.

== Geography ==
Kusmi, a Tehsil/Block, is located 96 km northeast of Ambikapur. Kusmi is a part of Samri (Vidhan Sabha constituency). It is connected by two roads, both of which join the NH 343. One road passes through Rajpur and another passes through Samri Chandarpur Semarsot. The area has excellent wireless and broadband coverage.

=== Languages ===
Hindi is the official and most spoken language, along with Bhojpuri, a tongue in the Bihari language group with almost 40,000,000 speakers. Bhojpuri is written in both the Devanagari and Kaithi scripts.

== Facilities ==
- Market: A small market known as Kusmi Bazaar is situated in middle of the town. The bazaar includes shops such as a medical store, electrical store, and various clothing stores.:
- Police Station: A police station is situated at the heart of Kusmi.
- Post Office: A post office with speed-post parcel and other postal services is located at Aryan Lodge Samri road.
- Water stations: Two potable water stations are available.
- Bank: Kusmi has several banks, of which SBI is dominant.
