= Surgujia dialect =

Dialect in Surguja Division Of Chhattisgarh

Surgujia
- सरगुजिया
- Native to: India
- Region: Chhattisgarh
- Native speakers: 1.74 million (2011 census)
- Language family: Indo-European: Indo-Iranian; Indo-Aryan; Central; Eastern Hindi; Chhattisgarhi; Surgujia
- Writing system: Devanagari

Language codes
- ISO 639-3: sgj
- Glottolog: surg1246

Surgujia is an Indo-Aryan language variety spoken in Chhattisgarh. It belongs to the Eastern Hindi group. It is generally considered as a dialect of Chattisgarhi language.

== Speakers ==
Surgujia is primarily spoken in Surguja, Jashpur, and Koriya districts of Chhattisgarh; and to a lesser extent in Raigarh and Korba.

Speakers of Surgujia have often been conflated with those of Chhattisgarhi. Furthermore, as is the case with many Hindi languages and other regional languages, Surgujia has often been subsumed under the all-encompassing bracket of Standard Hindi due to erroneous, arbitrary or politically motivated categorisation.

== Classification ==
It is generally regarded by many as a dialect of Chhattisgarhi, and was designated as such by the linguist George A. Grierson in his comprehensive Linguistic Survey of India. Indeed, Surgujia possesses a lexical similarity of 71%-76% with Chhattisgarhi, according to Ethnologue. Surgujia is now listed as a distinct language by Ethnologue, though Glottolog still considers it a dialect of Chhattisgarhi.
