= Dubraj rice =

Variety of rice

Dubraj is a variety of rice. It is an aromatic short to medium grain rice. It is a traditional Indian cultivar with intermediate amylose and gelatinization temperature. It is most common in Madhya Pradesh and Chhattisgarh, mainly Bilaspur.

== Geographical Indication ==
In March 2023, Dubraj specifically originating from regions of Chhattisgarh was officially granted a geographical indication tag by the geographical indications registry of India.recognising its regional uniqueness and traditional cultivation heritage

In January 2026, Chhattisgarh CM Vishnu Deo Sai announced that the exemption on market fee for rice exporters would be extended for 2027, aimed at boosting rice exports in the state.The state is described as the "rice bowl" of India and continues to live up to that identity. CM highlighted the wide range of paddy varieties cultivated, making special mentions of Dubraj rice and Jeeraphool from the Surguja region.
