= Chhattisgarhi language =

Indo-Aryan language spoken in Chhattisgarh, India

Chhattisgarhi
- छत्तीसगढ़ी
- The word "Chhattisgarhi" written in Devanagari script
- Native to: India
- Region: Chhattisgarh and a minority of speakers in western Odisha and Maharashtra
- Native speakers: 16.2 million, partial count (2011 census) (additional speakers counted under Hindi)
- Language family: Indo-European: Indo-Iranian; Indo-Aryan; Central Zone; Eastern Hindi; Chhattisgarhi
- Dialects: Surgujia
- Writing system: Devanagari, Odia

Official status
- Official language in: India: Chhattisgarh

Language codes
- ISO 639-3: Either: hne – Chhattisgarhi sgj – Surgujia
- Glottolog: chha1249
- Linguasphere: 59-AAF-ta

Chhattisgarhi (छत्तीसगढ़ी) is an Indo-Aryan language spoken by approximately 16.25 million or 1.62 crore people in Chhattisgarh, western Odisha, Madhya Pradesh and Maharashtra in India. It is the co-official language of Chhattisgarh alongside Hindi. It is grouped within the Eastern Hindi languages and is counted by the Indian national census as a dialect of Hindi.

== Phonology ==
=== Consonants ===
		Labial	Dental/ Alveolar	Retroflex	Post-alv./ Palatal	Velar	Glottal
Nasal		m	n	ɳ	ɲ	ŋ	
Stop/ Affricate	voiceless	p	t	ʈ	tʃ	k	
Stop/ Affricate	aspirated	pʰ	tʰ	ʈʰ	tʃʰ	kʰ	
Stop/ Affricate	voiced	b	d	ɖ	dʒ	ɡ	
Stop/ Affricate	breathy	bʱ	dʱ	ɖʱ	dʒʱ	ɡʱ	
Fricative			s				h
Trill/Tap	voiced		r	ɽ			
Trill/Tap	breathy			ɽʱ			
Lateral	voiced		l				
Lateral	breathy		lʱ				
Approximant		ʋ			j		

- /r/ can also be heard as a tap [ɾ].

=== Vowels ===
	Front	Central	Back
High	iː		uː
High	ɪ		ʊ
Mid	eː	ə	oː
Mid	ɛ	ə	ɔ
Low		aː	

- /ə/ can also be heard as back [ʌ], [ɐ].
- Nasalisation is also phonemically distinctive.

== Sample text ==
The following is a sample text in Chhattisgarhi, of Article 1 of the Universal Declaration of Human Rights, with a transliteration (IAST) and transcription (IPA).

Chhattisgarhi in Devanagari Script

सबो लोगन मन के गौरव अऊ अधिकार मन के मामला म जनम ले मिले स्वतंत्रता अऊ बरोबरी मिले हे। ओमन ल बुद्धि अऊ अन्तरात्मा के देन मिले हे अऊ ओमन ल एक दूसर ल परेम भाईचारा के भाव ले बेवहार करना चाही।

Transliteration (ISO)

Sabo loɡan man ke ɡaurav aū adhikār man ke māmlā ma janam le mile svatantratā aū barobari mile he. Oman la buddhi aū antarātmā ke den mile he aū oman la ek dūsar la parem bhāīcārā ke bhāv le bevahār karnā cāhī.

Transcription (IPA)

səbo loɡən mən ke ɡɔrəʋ əuː əd̪ʰikaːr mən ke maːmlaː mə dʒənəm le mile sʋət̪ənt̪rət̪aː auː bərobəri mile he. omən lə bud̪d̪ʰi auː ant̪əraːt̪maː ke d̪en mile he auː omən lə ek d̪uːsər lə pərem bʰaːiːtʃaːraː ke bʰaːʋ le beʋəhaːr kərnaː tʃaːhiː

Translation (grammatical)

All human beings are born free and equal in dignity and rights. They are endowed with reason and conscience and should act towards one another in a spirit of brotherhood.

== See also ==
- Languages of India
- Languages with official status in India
- List of Indian languages by total speakers

== Bibliography ==
- G. A. Zograph: Languages of South Asia, 1960 (translated by G.L. Campbell, 1982), Routledge, London.
- H. L. Kavyopadhyaya, G. A. Grierson and L. P. Kavya-Vinod. 1921. A grammar of the Chhattisgarhi dialect of Eastern Hindi.
- Masica, Colin P. 1993. The Indo-Aryan languages. (Cambridge Language Surveys.) Cambridge: Cambridge University Press.
- Boehm, Kelly Kilgo. 2022. A Preliminary Sociolinguistic Survey of the Chhattisgarhi-Speaking Peoples of India. SIL International.
- C. K. Chandrakar, "Chhattisgarhi Shabadkosh"
- C. K. Chandrakar, "Manak Chhattisgarhi Vyakaran"
- C. K. Chandrakar, "Chhattisgarhi Muhawara Kosh"
- Chhattisgarh Rajbhasha Aayog, "Prashashnik Shabdkosh Vol. I & II"
