= Surguja Lok Sabha constituency =

Lok Sabha constituency in Chhattisgarh

Coordinates: 23.1°N 83.2°E

Sarguja CG-1
- Lok Sabha constituency

Constituency details
- Country: India
- Region: Central India
- State: Chhattisgarh
- Assembly constituencies: Premnagar; Bhatgaon; Pratappur; Ramanujganj; Samri; Lundra; Ambikapur; Sitapur
- Established: 1952
- Total electors: 18,19,347
- Reservation: ST

Member of Parliament
- 18th Lok Sabha
- Incumbent Chintamani Maharaj
- Party: Bharatiya Janata Party
- Elected year: 2024

Surguja Lok Sabha constituency is one of the eleven Lok Sabha (parliamentary) constituencies in Chhattisgarh state in central India. Chintamani Maharaj is the incumbent elected MP from the constituency following the 2024 Indian general election.

== Assembly segments ==
Sarguja Lok Sabha constituency is reserved for Scheduled Tribes (ST) candidates. It is composed of the following assembly segments:

#	Name	District	Member	Party	Leading (in 2024)
4	Premnagar	Surajpur	Bhulan Singh Marabi	BJP	BJP
5	Bhatgaon	Surajpur	Laxmi Rajwade	BJP	BJP
6	Pratappur (ST)	Balrampur	Shakuntala Singh Portey	BJP	INC
7	Ramanujganj (ST)	Balrampur	Ramvichar Netam	BJP	BJP
8	Samri (ST)	Balrampur	Uddheshwari Paikra	BJP	INC
9	Lundra (ST)	Surguja	Prabodh Minz	BJP	BJP
10	Ambikapur	Surguja	Rajesh Agrawal	BJP	BJP
11	Sitapur (ST)	Surguja	Ramkumar Toppo	BJP	INC

== Members of Parliament ==
Year	Member	Party
1952	Chandikeshwar Sharan Singh Judeo	Indian National Congress
1952	Babu Nath Singh	Indian National Congress
1957	Chandikeshwar Sharan Singh Judeo	Indian National Congress
1957	Babu Nath Singh	Indian National Congress
1962	Babu Nath Singh	Indian National Congress
1967	Babu Nath Singh	Indian National Congress
1971	Babu Nath Singh	Indian National Congress
1977	Larang Sai	Janata Party
1980	Chakradhari Singh	Indian National Congress
1984	Lal Vijay Pratap Singh	Indian National Congress
1989	Larang Sai	Bharatiya Janata Party
1991	Khelsai Singh	Indian National Congress
1996	Khelsai Singh	Indian National Congress
1998	Larang Sai	Bharatiya Janata Party
1999	Khelsai Singh	Indian National Congress
2004	Nand Kumar Sai	Bharatiya Janata Party
2009	Murarilal Singh	Bharatiya Janata Party
2014	Kamalbhan Singh Marabi	Bharatiya Janata Party
2019	Renuka Singh	Bharatiya Janata Party
2024	Chintamani Maharaj	Bharatiya Janata Party

== Election results ==
=== 2024 ===
2024 Indian general election: Sarguja
Party	Candidate	Votes	%	±%
BJP	Chintamani Maharaj	713,200	51.30	
INC	Shashi Singh	6,48,378	46.70	
NOTA	None of the above	28,121	2.0	
Majority		64,822	4.46	
Turnout		14,56,077	79.97	▲2.57
BJP hold		Swing		

=== 2019 ===
2019 Indian general elections: Sarguja
Party	Candidate	Votes	%	±%
BJP	Renuka Singh	663,711	51.82	▲2.53
INC	Khelsai Singh	5,05,838	39.50	▲2.60
GGP	Asha Devi Poya	24,463	1.91	N/A
BSP	Maya Bhagat	18,534	1.45	▼0.37
NOTA	None of the Above	29,265	2.29	▼0.33
Majority		1,57,873	12.32	▼0.07
Turnout		12,81,216	77.40	▼0.56
BJP hold		Swing		

=== General elections 2014 ===
2014 Indian general elections: Sarguja
Party	Candidate	Votes	%	±%
BJP	Kamalbhan Singh Marabi	585,336	49.29	▼2.43
INC	Ramdeo Tirkey	4,38,100	36.90	▲4.98
NOTA	None of the above	31,104	2.62	N/A
BSP	Dharmjeet Singh Markam	21,633	1.82	▼0.75
Independent	Rajnath	15,515	1.31	New
Majority		1,47,236	12.39	▼7.42
Turnout		11,33,514	77.96	▲16.34
BJP hold		Swing		

=== General elections 2009 ===
2009 Indian general elections: Sarguja
Party	Candidate	Votes	%	±%
BJP	Murarilal Singh	416,532	51.73	
INC	Bhanu Pratap Singh	2,56,984	31.92	
BSP	Dhan Singh Dhurve	20,700	2.57	
IND.	Suraj Deo Singh Khairwar	20,488	2.54	
JMM	Anoop Minj	15,021	1.87	
CPI(M)	Bal Singh	11,667	1.45	
GGP	Bhupnath Singh Maravi	8,827	1.10	
LJP	Somnath Bhagat	4,278	0.53	
JD(U)	Kumait B.D.O.	4,261	0.53	
Majority		1,59,548	19.81	
Turnout		8,05,202	61.62	
BJP hold		Swing		

== See also ==
- Surguja district
- List of constituencies of the Lok Sabha
