= List of Rajya Sabha members from Chhattisgarh =

The list of current and past Rajya Sabha members from the Chhattisgarh State. State elect 5 member for the term of 6 years and indirectly elected by the state legislators, since year 2000.

== List of all members ==
Chronological list by last date of appointment

- * represents current members

Name	Party	Term start	Term end	Term	Notes
Laxmi Verma	BJP	10-Apr-2026	9-Apr-2032	1	*
Phulo Devi Netam	INC	10-Apr-2026	9-Apr-2032	2	*
Devendra Pratap Singh	BJP	03-Apr-2024	02-Apr-2030	1	*
Rajeev Shukla	INC	30-Jun-2022	29-Jun-2028	1	*
Ranjeet Ranjan	INC	30-Jun-2022	29-Jun-2028	1	*
Phulo Devi Netam	INC	10-Apr-2020	9-Apr-2026	1	
K. T. S. Tulsi	INC	10-Apr-2020	9-Apr-2026	1	
Saroj Pandey	BJP	3-Apr-2018	2-Apr-2024	1	
Ramvichar Netam	BJP	30-Jun-2016	29-Jun-2022	1	
Chhaya Verma	INC	30-Jun-2016	29-Jun-2022	1	
Ranvijay Singh Judev	BJP	10-Apr-2014	9-Apr-2020	1	
Motilal Vora	INC	10-Apr-2014	9-Apr-2020	3	
Bhushan Lal Jangde	BJP	3-Apr-2012	2-Apr-2018	1	
Nand Kumar Sai	BJP	30-Jun-2010	29-Jun-2016	2	
Mohsina Kidwai	INC	30-Jun-2010	29-Jun-2016	2	
Nand Kumar Sai	BJP	4-Aug-2009	29-Jun-2010	1	bye- resignation of Dilip Singh Judeo
Shiv Pratap Singh	BJP	10-Apr-2008	9-Apr-2014	1	
Motilal Vora	INC	10-Apr-2008	9-Apr-2014	2	
Shreegopal Vyas	BJP	3-Apr-2006	2-Apr-2012	1	
Dilip Singh Judeo	BJP	30-Jun-2004	16-May-2009	2	elected to Bilaspur LS on 16-May-2009
Mohsina Kidwai	INC	30-Jun-2004	29-Jun-2010	1	
Kamla Manhar	INC	26-Sep-2003	2-Apr-2006	1	bye- death of Manhar Bhagatram
Ramadhar Kashyap	INC	10-Apr-2002	9-Apr-2008	1	
Motilal Vora	INC	10-Apr-2002	9-Apr-2008	1	
Manhar Bhagatram	INC	3-Apr-2000	19-Jun-2003	1	elected as Rajya Sabha members from Madhya Pradesh continued as RS member from Chhattisgarh from 1-Nov-2000 onwards
Dilip Singh Judeo	BJP	30-Jun-1998	29-Jun-2004	1	elected as Rajya Sabha members from Madhya Pradesh continued as RS member from Chhattisgarh from 1-Nov-2000 onwards
Jhumak Lal Bendia	INC	30-Jun-1998	29-Jun-2004	1	elected as Rajya Sabha members from Madhya Pradesh continued as RS member from Chhattisgarh from 1-Nov-2000 onwards
Lakkhiram Agarwal	BJP	10-Apr-1996	9-Apr-2002	1	elected as Rajya Sabha members from Madhya Pradesh continued as RS member from Chhattisgarh from 1-Nov-2000 onwards
Surendra Kumar Singh	INC	10-Apr-1996	9-Apr-2002	1	elected as Rajya Sabha members from Madhya Pradesh continued as RS member from Chhattisgarh from 1-Nov-2000 onwards
