= Narhari Prasad Sai =

Indian politician (1929–1999)

Narhari Prasad Sai (1929 – 8 December 1999) was an Indian politician who was a member of the 6th Lok Sabha, the lower house of the Indian Parliament. He was from Bandarchuan village near Kunkuri in the Jashpur State, India.

Sai was elected from Raigarh in Madhya Pradesh. He had defeated the Indian National Congress (INC) candidate in the post-emergency elections to the Parliament and was made a Minister of State for Communication in the Morarji Desai led Janata party government. He lost the next election to Pushpa Devi Singh of the INC in 1980 and gradually faded out of the political scene.

Sai died in Jashpur on 8 December 1999, at the age of 70.
