= Bandarchuan =

Coordinates: 22.694°N 83.833°E

Bandarchuan is a village near Kunkuri in the Jashpur district and earlier of Raigarh district in Chhattisgarh state of India. It is the birthplace of Narhari Prasad Sai, member of 6th Lok Sabha from Raigarh Lok Sabha constituency.
