= Renuka Singh =

Renuka Singh may refer to:

- Renuka Singh (politician) (born 1964), Indian politician
- Renuka Singh (cricketer) (born 1996), Indian cricketer
