= Chhota Koranja =

Chhota Koranja is a small village in Jashpur district of Chhattisgarh state of India.

== See also ==
- Jashpur district
