= Korangrenga =

Village in Chhattisgarh, India

Korangrenga is a small village in Jashpur district of Chhattisgarh state of India.

== See also ==
- Jashpur district
