= Lokhandi =

Village in India

Coordinates: 22°54′24″N 84°15′30″E

Lokhandi is a small village in Jashpur district of Chhattisgarh state of India.

== See also ==
- Jashpur district
