= Jashpur Airport =

Airport in Aagdih, Chhattisgarh, India

- IATA: none; ICAO: none

Summary
- Airport type: Public
- Operator: State Government
- Serves: Jashpur
- Location: Aagdih, Chhattisgarh, India
- Elevation AMSL: 1,499 ft / 457 m
- Coordinates: 22°55′57.8″N 84°13′51.3″E

Map
- Location of the airport in Chhattisgarh Jashpur Airport (India)

Runways
Direction	Length		Surface
Direction	ft	m	Surface
09/27	3,280	1,000	asphalt

Jashpur Airport is located at Aagdih, 12 km (7.5 mi) east of Jashpur Nagar, in Chhattisgarh, India. The air strip is used mainly for small aircraft. The airstrip lies on the Raipur highway and is owned by the State government.
