= Laxmi Verma =

Indian politician

Member of Parliament, Rajya Sabha
- Incumbent
- Assumed office 10 April 2026
- Preceded by: K. T. S. Tulsi
- Constituency: Chhattisgarh

Personal details
- Born: Baloda Bazar,Chhattisgarh, India
- Party: Bharatiya Janata Party
- Education: M.A.(2001) pandit Ravishankar Shukla University
- Occupation: Politician

Laxmi Verma is an Indian politician from the Bharatiya Janata Party. She is a Member of Parliament, representing Chhattisgarh in the Rajya Sabha, the upper house of India's Parliament since April 2026.
