= National Highway 143B (India) =

National Highway in India

National Highway 143B

Route information
- Auxiliary route of NH 43
- Length: 67.8 km (42.1 mi)

Major junctions
- South end: Jashpur Nagar
- North end: Mahuadanr

Location
- Country: India
- States: Chhattisgarh, Jharkhand

Highway system
- Roads in India; Expressways; National; State; Asian
← NH 43	→ NH 143

National Highway 143B, commonly referred to as NH 143B is a national highway in India. It is a secondary route of National Highway 43. NH-143B runs in the states of Chhattisgarh and Jharkhand in India.

== Route ==
NH143B connects Jashpur Nagar, Jagannathpur, Gobindpur, Dumri and Mahuadanr in the states of Chhattisgarh and Jharkhand.

== Junctions ==
NH 43 Terminal near Jashpur Nagar.

== See also ==
- List of national highways in India
- List of national highways in India by state
