= Gholeng =

Coordinates: 22°54′12″N 84°11′44″E

Gholeng is a small village in Jashpur district of Chhattisgarh state of India. It has a population of 1,803.

== See also ==
- Jashpur district
