= Pandrapat =

Village in Chhattisgarh, India

Coordinates: 23°05′42″N 83°41′05″E

Pandrapat, also called Pandrapath and Pandraput is a small village in Jashpur district of Chhattisgarh state of India.

== See also ==
- Jashpur district
