= Bal Singh =

Indian politician

Secretary of Communist Party of India (Marxist), Chhattisgarh
- Incumbent
- Assumed office 20 December 2024
- Preceded by: M.K. Nandi

Personal details
- Party: Communist Party of India (Marxist)
- Occupation: Politician

Bal Singh is an Indian communist politician and a tribal leader from Chhattisgarh. He is currently serving as the secretary of the Chhattisgarh state unit of Communist Party of India (Marxist). He is also one of the four permanent invitees of Central Committee of CPIM since 6 April 2025, the others being Sudeep Dutta, John Brittas and Sudhanva Deshpande.

== Political career ==
Bal Singh is a dedicated advocate for tribal rights, having worked closely with the Adivasi Adhikar Rashtriya Manch, the tribal wing of the Communist Party of India (Marxist). His efforts focus on addressing pressing concerns such as land rights, preservation of tribal culture, and the impact of development policies on indigenous populations. A strong proponent of social justice, Singh is committed to protecting tribal communities from exploitation and violence, ensuring their rights are respected and protected.

== Electoral performance ==
He contested as CPI(M) candidate from Sarguja constituency in 2009 Indian general election. But he got 11,667 votes which were 1.45% of the total votes polled in that constituency and stood at 6th position.

2009 Indian general elections : Sarguja
Party	Candidate	Votes	%	±%
BJP	Murarilal Singh	416,532	51.73	
INC	Bhanu Pratap Singh	2,56,984	31.92	
BSP	Dhan Singh Dhurve	20,700	2.57	
IND.	Suraj Deo Singh Khairwar	20,488	2.54	
JMM	Anoop Minj	15,021	1.87	
CPI(M)	Bal Singh	11,667	1.45	
GGP	Bhupnath Singh Maravi	8,827	1.10	
LJP	Somnath Bhagat	4,278	0.53	
JD(U)	Kumait B.D.O.	4,261	0.53	
Majority		1,59,548	19.81	
Turnout		8,05,202	61.62	
BJP hold		Swing		
