= Larang Sai =

Indian politician

Minister of State Government of India
- In office 14 August 1977 – 28 July 1979
- Prime Minister: Morarji Desai
- Ministry: Term
- Minister of Parliamentary Affairs: 14 August 1977 - 28 July 1979
- Minister of Labour: 14 August 1977 - 28 July 1979

Member of Parliament, Lok Sabha
- In office 1998–1999
- Preceded by: Khelsai Singh
- Succeeded by: Khelsai Singh
- Constituency: Sarguja
- In office 1989–1991
- Preceded by: Lal Vijay Pratap Singh
- Succeeded by: Khelsai Singh
- Constituency: Sarguja
- In office 1977–1980
- Preceded by: Babu Nath Singh
- Succeeded by: Chakradhari Singh
- Constituency: Sarguja

Member of Madhya Pradesh Legislative Assembly
- In office 1980–1985
- Preceded by: Amin Sai
- Succeeded by: Maheshwar Ram
- Constituency: Samri
- In office 1967–1977
- Preceded by: Jai Ram
- Succeeded by: Amin Sai
- Constituency: Samri

Personal details
- Born: 28 October 1938 Jaswantpur, Sarguja
- Died: 7 January 2004 (aged 65) Raipur, Chhattisgarh
- Party: Bharatiya Janata Party
- Spouse: Loiri Devi
- Children: 1 son, 6 daughters
- Parent: Ghur Sai (father)

Larang Sai (20 October 1935 – 7 January 2004) was a leader of Bharatiya Janata Party. He was a member of Lok Sabha and served as union minister of state in Labour ministry from 1977 to 1979. He was Member of Parliament from Surguja Lok Sabha constituency in 1977 as Bharatiya Lok Dal, in 1989 and 1998 as Bharatiya Janata Party.
