= Ramvichar Netam =

Indian politician

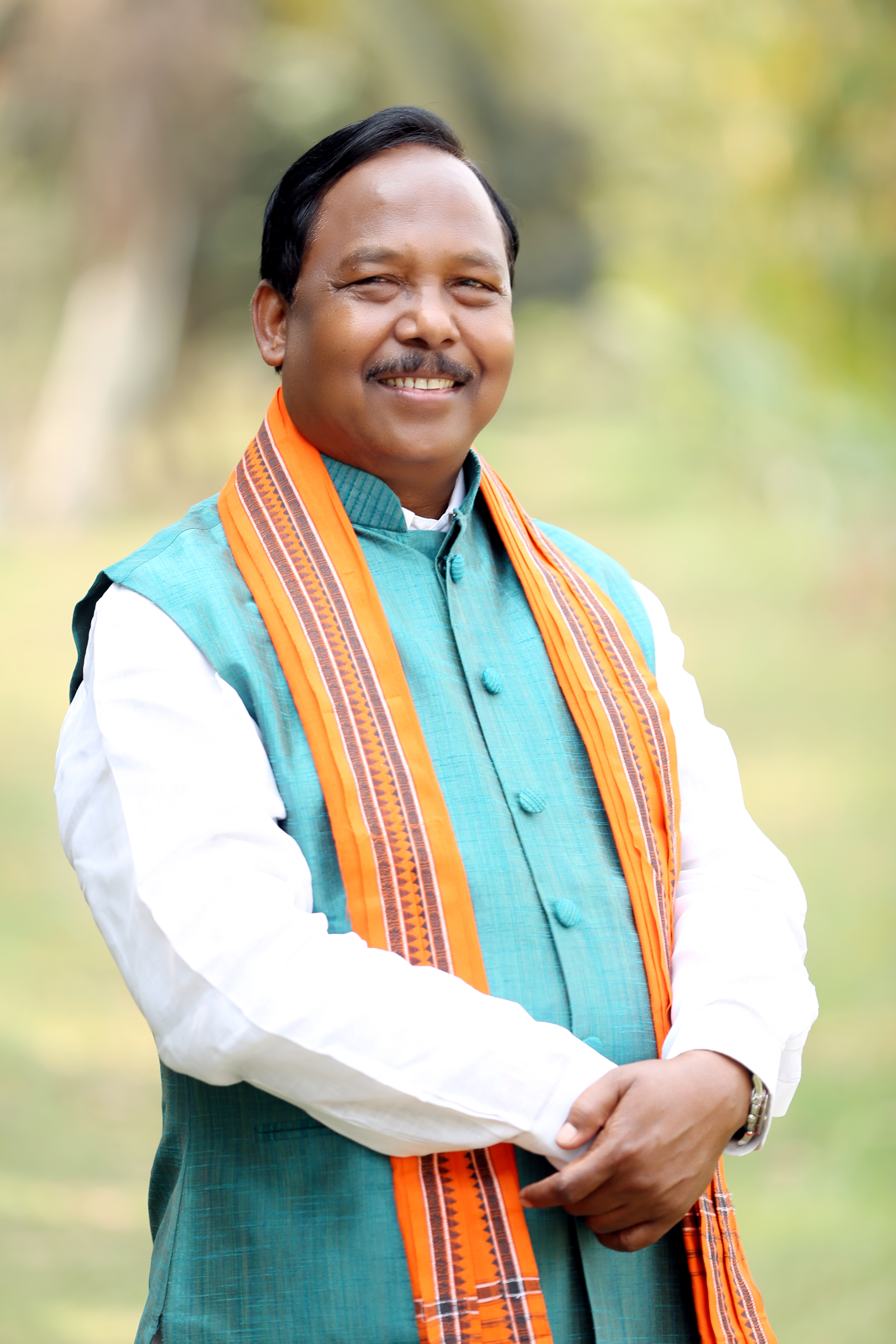

Minister of Agriculture and Farmers Welfare Government of Chhattisgarh
- Incumbent
- Assumed office 22 December 2023
- Chief Minister: Vishnu Deo Sai
- Preceded by: Ravindra Choubey

Minister of ST, SC, OBC & Minority Development Government of Chhattisgarh
- Incumbent
- Assumed office 22 December 2023
- Chief Minister: Vishnu Deo Sai
- Preceded by: Mohan Markam
- In office 8 December 2003 – 18 June 2005
- Chief Minister: Raman Singh
- Preceded by: Madhav Singh Dhruw
- Succeeded by: Kedar Nath Kashyap

Member of Chhattisgarh Legislative Assembly
- Incumbent
- Assumed office 3 December 2023
- Preceded by: Brihaspat Singh
- Constituency: Ramanujganj
- In office 2008–2013
- Preceded by: Constituency established
- Succeeded by: Brihaspat Singh
- Constituency: Ramanujganj
- In office 2000–2008
- Preceded by: himself
- Succeeded by: Constituency abolished
- Constituency: Pal

Member of Parliament, Rajya Sabha
- In office 30 June 2016 – 29 June 2022
- Preceded by: Nand Kumar Sai
- Succeeded by: Ranjeet Ranjan
- Constituency: Chhattisgarh

Minister of Water Resources Government of Chhattisgarh
- In office 18 February 2012 – 10 December 2013
- Chief Minister: Raman Singh
- Preceded by: Hemchand Yadav
- Succeeded by: Brijmohan Agrawal

Minister of Rural Development Government of Chhattisgarh
- In office 22 December 2008 – 18 February 2012
- Chief Minister: Raman Singh
- Preceded by: Ajay Chandrakar
- Succeeded by: Hemchand Yadav

Minister of Home Affairs Government of Chhattisgarh
- In office 18 June 2005 – 8 December 2008
- Chief Minister: Raman Singh
- Preceded by: Brijmohan Agrawal
- Succeeded by: Nanki Ram Kanwar

Member of Madhya Pradesh Legislative Assembly
- In office 1990–2000
- Preceded by: Deosai
- Succeeded by: himself
- Constituency: Pal

Personal details
- Born: 1 March 1961 (age 65) Sanawal, Chhattisgarh, India
- Party: Bharatiya Janata Party
- Spouse: Pushpa Netam (m. 1987)
- Children: 2 daughters
- Parents: Ramlochan Netam (father); Jeerhuliya Netam (mother)
- Education: SSC

Ramvichar Netam (born 1 March 1961) is an Indian politician currently serving as Minister of Agriculture and ST, SC, OBC & Minority Development in Government of Chhattisgarh. Previously, he served as a Member of Parliament in Rajya Sabha from Chhattisgarh and was Cabinet Minister during Raman Singh's Ministry between 2003 and 2013. He represents Ramanujganj in Chhattisgarh Legislative Assembly. He is also elected as Pro tem Speaker of 6th Chhattisgarh Legislative Assembly.

== Political career ==
Netam was first elected to Madhya Pradesh Legislative Assembly in 1990 from Pal Constituency and was re-elected 1993 & 1998. After the creation of Chhattisgarh out of Madhya Pradesh, he was elected to Chhattisgarh Legislative Assembly in 2003 from same seat and became Cabinet Minister for Minister of ST, SC, OBC & Minority Development. In 2005 Cabinet reshuffle, he became Minister of Home and Jail. In 2008, Pal Constituency got abolished in delimitation and Netam contested from Newly created Ramanujganj and defeated Congress candidate Brihaspat Singh by margin of 4579 votes and became Cabinet Minister for Rural Development in second Raman Singh's Ministry. However, he lost 2013 Assembly election to Congress candidate Brihaspat Singh by margin of 11,592 votes. In 2015, Amit Shah appointed him as National Secretary of Bharatiya Janata Party, and in 2016 he was appointed as Co-incharge of Jharkhand state BJP With Trivendra Singh Rawat.

On 29 May 2016, he was nominated as the BJP candidate from Chhattisgarh for the Rajya Sabha elections on 11 June.
