= Nand Kumar Sai =

Indian politician

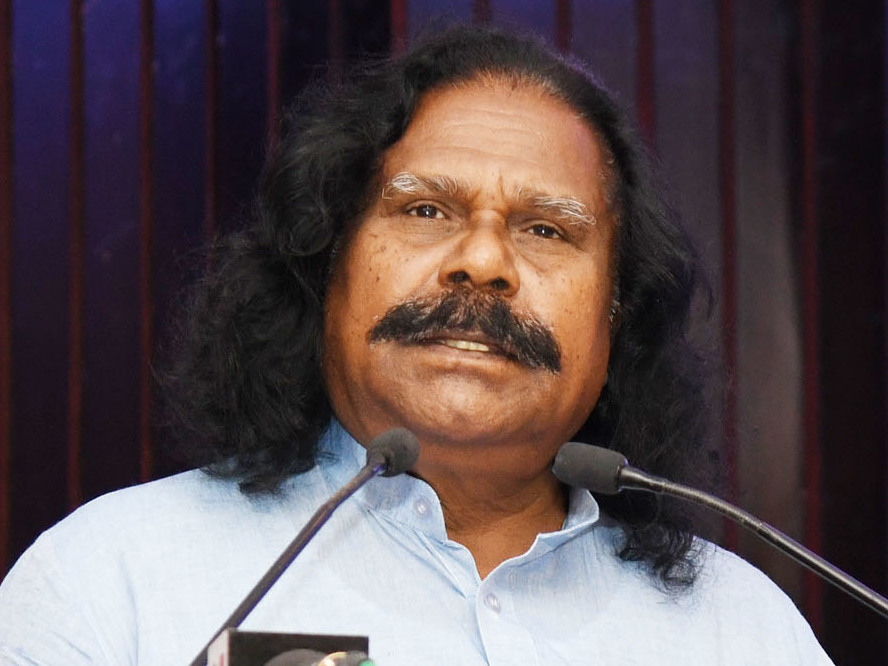
- Nand Kumar Sai, 2018

Chairman, National Commission for Scheduled Tribes
- In office 28 February 2017 – 27 February 2020
- Preceded by: Rameshwar Oraon
- Succeeded by: Harsh Chauhan

Member of Parliament, Rajya Sabha
- In office 4 August 2009 – 29 June 2016
- Preceded by: Dilip Singh Judeo
- Succeeded by: Ramvichar Netam
- Constituency: Chhattisgarh

Member of Parliament, Lok Sabha
- In office 22 May 2004 – 21 May 2009
- Preceded by: Khelsai Singh
- Succeeded by: Murarilal Singh
- Constituency: Sarguja
- In office 16 May 1996 – 18 March 1998
- Preceded by: Pushpa Devi Singh
- Succeeded by: Ajit Jogi
- Constituency: Raigarh
- In office 1989–1991
- Preceded by: Pushpa Devi Singh
- Succeeded by: Pushpa Devi Singh
- Constituency: Raigarh

Leader of Opposition in Chhattisgarh Legislative Assembly
- In office 14 December 2000 – 5 December 2003
- Preceded by: Post created
- Succeeded by: Mahendra Karma

Member of Legislative Assembly
- In office December 1998 – December 2003
- Preceded by: Vishnu Dev Sai
- Succeeded by: Deneshwar Sai
- Constituency: Tapkara, Jashpur
- In office 1985–1989
- Preceded by: Deneshwar Sai
- Succeeded by: Vishnu Dev Sai
- Constituency: Tapkara, Jashpur
- In office 1977–1980
- Preceded by: Deneshwar Sai
- Succeeded by: Deneshwar Sai
- Constituency: Tapkara, Jashpur

Personal details
- Born: 1 January 1946 (age 80) Bhagora, Jashpur State, British India
- Party: Bharatiya Janata Party (since 2024; 1980–2023)
- Other political affiliations: Indian National Congress (2023); Janata Party (1977-1980)
- Spouse: Gulmohar Devi
- Children: 3 sons and 4 daughters
- As of 25 September, 2006

Nand Kumar Sai (born 1 January 1946) is an Indian politician. He is a former member of the Indian National Congress and also Bharatiya Janata Party. He was elected to the Lok Sabha, 1989–1991 and 1996–1998, from Raigarh (Lok Sabha constituency) when it was in Madhya Pradesh. In 2004 he was elected a member of the 14th Lok Sabha representing Surguja constituency of Chhattisgarh. He was elected a Rajya Sabha MP from Chhattisgarh in 2009 and 2010. He remained an MP until 2016.

== Early life ==
Nand Kumar Sai was born on 1 January 1946 in the small village of Bhagora in the Jashpur district, Jashpur State (now a part of the Indian state of Chhattisgarh. His father was Likhan Sai and his mother was Rupani Devi. He was born into a family of farmers and went on to secure a master's degree in political science from the N.E.S. College formerly Ravishankar University.

== Political career ==
Since student life, he was deeply moved by the economic plight of Adivasis due to the consumption of liquor and dissuaded them from consumption of liquor, even going to the extent of giving up the consumption of salt in his food since 1970 to dissuade them from consumption of liquor.

He served as the President of:

(i) N.E.S. College Students' Union from 1972 to 1973

(ii) B.J.P. District Raigarh from 1980 to 1982

(iii) B.J.P. Madhya Pradesh from 1989

(iv) B.J.P. Chhattisgarh from 2003 to 2004.

He also served as the General Secretary B.J.P. Madhya Pradesh from 1986 to 1988. He was the Executive Member B.J.P. Madhya Pradesh since 1988. He was the member of National Council of B.J.P. from 1989 to 1991 and National Executive of B.J.P.

== Positions held ==
- 1977–79 and 1985–89: Member, Madhya Pradesh Legislative Assembly (two terms)
- 1977–78 and 1986–88: Member, Privileges Committee, Madhya Pradesh Legislative Assembly
- 1978–79: Chairman, Committee on the Welfare of Scheduled Castes and Scheduled Tribes, Madhya Pradesh Legislative Assembly
- 1988–89: Member, Committee on the Welfare of Scheduled Castes and Scheduled Tribes, Madhya Pradesh Legislative Assembly
- 1989–1991: Ninth Lok Sabha Member, from Raigarh (Lok Sabha constituency) in Madhya Pradesh. Committee on the Welfare of Scheduled Castes and Scheduled Tribes
- 1990–91: Member, Consultative Committee for the Ministry of Finance Member, Consultative Committee for the Ministry of Home Affairs
- 1996–97: Member, Eleventh Lok Sabha (second term), from Raigarh (Lok Sabha constituency) in Madhya Pradesh
- 2000–2004: Member, Chhattisgarh Legislative Assembly
- 2004–2009: Member, Fourteenth Lok Sabha (third term)- Member, from Surguja (Lok Sabha constituency) in Chhattisgarh. Committee on Private Members Bills and Resolutions Member, Committee on Energy 2004, Member, Consultative Committee for the Ministry of Social Justice and Empowerment
- Aug. 2009: Elected to Rajya Sabha
- June 2010: Re-elected to Rajya Sabha.
- Aug. 2010 – May 2014 and Sept. 2014 onward: Member, Committee on Coal and Steel Aug. 2010 – May 2014 Member, Consultative Committee for the Ministry of Urban Development May 2012 – May 2014 and Aug. 2014 onwards Member, Committee on the Welfare of Scheduled Castes and Scheduled Tribes Sept.
- 2014 onward: Member, Committee on Social Justice and Empowerment Member, Committee on Papers Laid on the Table. On 28 February 2017, Nand Kumar Sai assumed charge as chairman of National Commission for Scheduled Tribes.
