= Brihaspat Singh =

Indian politician

Member of Chhattisgarh Legislative Assembly
- In office 8 December 2013 – 3 December 2023
- Preceded by: Ramvichar Netam
- Succeeded by: Ramvichar Netam
- Constituency: Ramanujganj

Personal details
- Born: 7 October 1960 (age 65) Bhanwarmal, Chhattisgarh, India
- Party: Indian National Congress (-2023)
- Spouse: Sheila Singh
- Education: 8th Pass
- Occupation: Politician
- Website: www.akgmedia.in
- As of 13 June, 2018

Brihaspat Singh (born 7 October 1960) was an MLA in Chhattisgarh from The Indian National Congress.

== Political career ==
He has been the president of District Congress Committee and a member of the District Panchayat. He is a major tribal leader in Surguja region.

In the year 2013, he became an MLA in the Chhattisgarh Legislative Assembly for the first time from Ramanujganj (Vidhan Sabha constituency). In 2021, he alleged an attempt on his life by aides of then-health minister T.S. Singh Deo on him. After Congress' loss in the 2023 assembly elections, he criticized the AICC committee for being too centralized. He was then suspended from Congress for a period of six years for 'anti-party activities'.

== See also ==
- Chhattisgarh Legislative Assembly
- 2013 Chhattisgarh Legislative Assembly election
