= Bharatpur-Sonhat Assembly constituency =

Legislative Assembly constituency in Chhattisgarh State, India

Coordinates: 23.48°N 82.52°E

Bharatpur-Sonhat
- Constituency No. 1 for the Chhattisgarh Legislative Assembly

Constituency details
- Country: India
- Region: Central India
- State: Chhattisgarh
- District: Koriya
- Lok Sabha constituency: Korba
- Established: 2008
- Total electors: 176,696
- Reservation: ST

Member of Legislative Assembly
- 6th Chhattisgarh Legislative Assembly
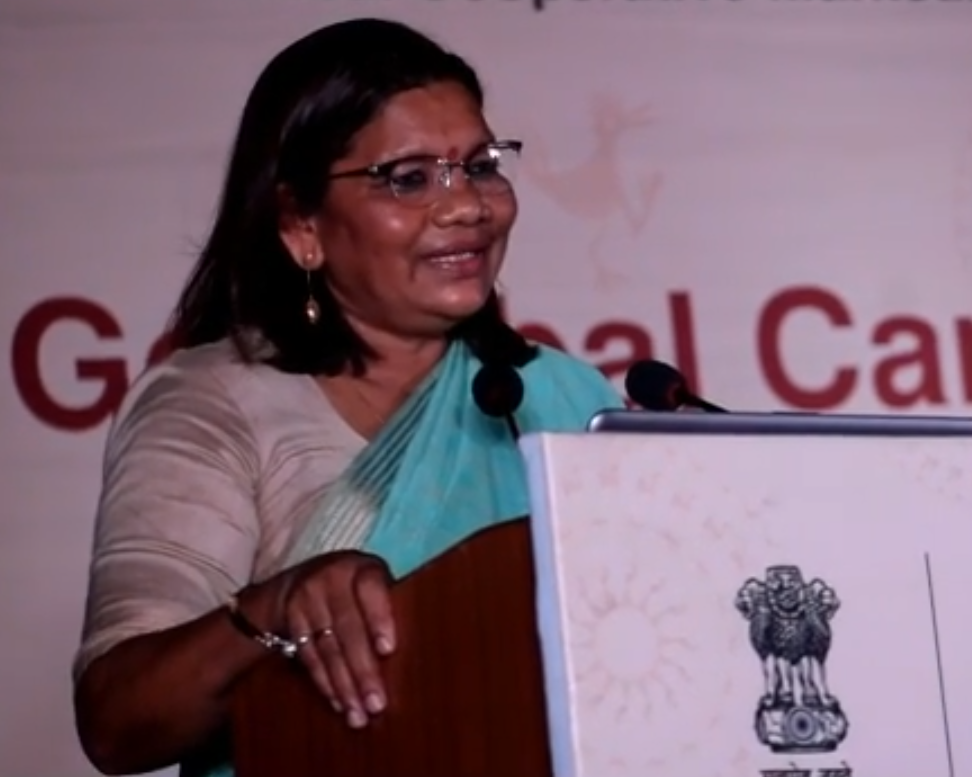
- Incumbent Renuka Singh
- Party: Bharatiya Janata Party
- Elected year: 2023

Bharatpur-Sonhat is one of the 90 Legislative Assembly constituencies of Chhattisgarh state in India.

It is part of Manedragarh-Chirmiri-Bharatpur district and is reserved for candidates belonging to the Scheduled Tribes.

== Members of the Legislative Assembly ==
Year	Member	Party
Until 2008: Constituency did not exist
2008	Phoolchand Singh	Bharatiya Janata Party
2013	Champa Devi Pawle	Bharatiya Janata Party
2018	Gulab Kamro	Indian National Congress
2023	Renuka Singh	Bharatiya Janata Party

== Election results ==
=== 2023 ===
Chhattisgarh Legislative Assembly Election, 2023: Bharatpur-Sonhat
Party	Candidate	Votes	%	±%
BJP	Renuka Singh	55,809	37.54	
INC	Gulab Kamro	50,890	32.23	
GGP	Shyam Singh Markam	33,863	22.78	
JCC	Krishana Prasad Cherva	1133	0.76	
NOTA	None of the Above	2,573	1.73	
Majority		4,919		
Turnout		1,48,678		
BJP gain from INC		Swing		

=== 2018 ===
Chhattisgarh Legislative Assembly Election, 2018: Bharatpur-Sonhat
Party	Candidate	Votes	%	±%
INC	Gulab Kamro	51,732	38.85	
BJP	Champa Devi Pawle	35,199	26.43	
GGP	Shyam Singh Markam	26,632	20.00	
BSP	Krishana Prasad Cherva	9,689	7.28	
NOTA	None of the Above	3,360	2.52	
Majority		16,533		
Turnout		1,33,175	83.91	
INC gain from BJP		Swing		

== See also ==
- List of constituencies of the Chhattisgarh Legislative Assembly
- जिला मनेन्द्रगढ़-चिरमिरी-भरतपुर छत्तीसगढ़ सरकार | प्राकृतिक सौन्दर्य से परिपूर्ण, मनेन्द्रगढ़-चिरमिरी-भरतपुर | भारत
