= Bhulan Singh Marabi =

Indian politician

Member of the Chhattisgarh Legislative Assembly
- Incumbent
- Assumed office 3 December 2023
- Preceded by: Khelsai Singh
- Constituency: Premnagar

Personal details
- Party: Bharatiya Janata Party
- Profession: Politician

Bhulan Singh Marabi (born 1964) is an Indian politician from Chhattisgarh. He is an MLA from Premnagar Assembly constituency in Surajpur district. He won the 2023 Chhattisgarh Legislative Assembly election, representing the Bharatiya Janata Party.

== Early life and education ==
Marabi is from Premnagar, Surajpur district, Chhattisgarh. His late father, Mahesh Marabi, was a farmer. He passed Class 8 in 1979 at a Secondary School in Salhi village, Ramanujnagar.

== Career ==
Marabi won from Premnagar Assembly constituency representing the Bharatiya Janata Party in 2023 Chhattisgarh Legislative Assembly election. He polled 99,957 votes and defeated his nearest rival, Khelsai Singh of the Indian National Congress, by a margin of 33,290 votes.
