= Pushpa Devi Singh =

Indian politician

Pushpa Devi Singh (born 18 May 1948) is an Indian politician who served on the 7th Lok Sabha for the Indian National Congress party.

Pushpa Devi Singh was born in Raipur, Chhattisgarh. She is the daughter of Nareshchandra Singh of Sarangarh, who had been Chief Minister of Madhya Pradesh. She was educated at St Joseph's Convent School, Sagar and Maharani Laxmibai College, Bhopal and Vikram University, Ujjain.

In 1980, Pushpa Singh polled 53.76 percent of the valid vote to win election to the Lok Sabha at age 31, making her one of that parliament's youngest members. Her nearest rival, Narhari Prasad Sai of Janata party, a minister in the Morarji cabinet, polled 21.97 percent of the vote.

In 1984 she was again elected for the Indian National Congress, to the 8th Lok Sabha. Her 62.51 percent vote share at this election, beating Bharatiya Janata Party candidate Nand Kumar Sai with 29.98 percent of the vote, was an unbroken record in her constituency until 2004.

In 1989 General Election Pushpa Singh was defeated by Nand Kumar Sai, when there was a wave against Rajiv Gandhi's Congress.
At elections to the 10th Lok Sabha in 1991 Singh won again, with 53.13 percent of the vote, again beating Nand Kumar Sai, who was by then the President of the State BJP. Her victories in these three elections are the only occasions when Congress polled more than 50% of the vote in her constituency.

In the 1996 Lok Sabha polls, Nand Kumar Sai defeated Pushpa Singh. Out of the 4 contests between the two, Pushpa Singh won 2 (1984, 1991) and Nand Kumar Sai won (1989, 1996) twice.

She is an active member of the Indian Nationalist Congress Party and lives at Girivilas Palace in Sarangarh, Chhattisgarh.
