= Ramanujganj Assembly constituency =

Legislative Assembly constituency in Chhattisgarh State, India

Coordinates: 23.81°N 83.7°E

Ramanujganj
- Constituency No. 7 for the Chhattisgarh Legislative Assembly

Constituency details
- Country: India
- Region: Central India
- State: Chhattisgarh
- Division: Surguja
- District: Balrampur
- Lok Sabha constituency: Surguja
- Established: 2008
- Total electors: 218,543
- Reservation: ST

Member of Legislative Assembly
- 6th Chhattisgarh Legislative Assembly
- Incumbent Ramvichar Netam
- Party: Bharatiya Janata Party
- Elected year: 2023
- Preceded by: Brihaspat Singh

Ramanujganj is one of the 90 Legislative Assembly constituencies of Chhattisgarh state in India. It is in Balrampur district and is reserved for candidates belonging to the Scheduled Tribes.

== Members of Legislative Assembly ==
Year	Member	Party
Until 2008: Constituency did not exist
2008	Ramvichar Netam	Bharatiya Janata Party
2013	Brihaspat Singh	Indian National Congress
2018	Brihaspat Singh	Indian National Congress
2023	Ramvichar Netam	Bharatiya Janata Party

== Election results ==
=== 2023 ===
2023 Chhattisgarh Legislative Assembly election: Ramanujganj
Party	Candidate	Votes	%	±%
BJP	Ramvichar Netam	99,574	54.58	+34.13
INC	Dr. Ajay Kumar Tirkey	69,911	38.32	−3.38
AAP	Neelam Didi	1,879	1.03	−0.10
NOTA	None of the Above	3,501	1.92	−0.70
Majority		29,663	16.26	−4.99
Turnout		182,436	83.48	+1.41
Registered electors		218,543		
BJP gain from INC		Swing		

=== 2018 ===
Chhattisgarh Legislative Assembly Election, 2018: Ramanujganj
Party	Candidate	Votes	%	±%
INC	Brihaspat Singh	64,580	41.70	
BJP	Ramkishun Singh	31,664	20.45	
Independent	Vinay Paikra	29,241	18.88	
GGP	Asha Devi Poya	4,691	3.03	
AAP	Chhotelal Tirkey	1,971	1.13	
NOTA	None of the Above	4,055	2.62	
Majority		32,916	21.25	
Turnout		1,54,873	82.07	
INC hold		Swing		

== See also ==
- List of constituencies of the Chhattisgarh Legislative Assembly
- Balrampur district, Chhattisgarh
- Ramanujganj
