= Premnagar Assembly constituency =

Legislative Assembly constituency in Chhattisgarh State, India

Coordinates: 22.83°N 82.74°E

Premnagar
- Constituency No. 4 for the Chhattisgarh Legislative Assembly

Constituency details
- Country: India
- Region: Central India
- State: Chhattisgarh
- Division: Surguja
- District: Surajpur
- Lok Sabha constituency: Surguja
- Established: 1967
- Total electors: 237,134
- Reservation: None

Member of Legislative Assembly
- 6th Chhattisgarh Legislative Assembly
- Incumbent Bhulan Singh Marabi
- Party: Bharatiya Janata Party
- Elected year: 2023
- Preceded by: Khelsai Singh

Premnagar is one of the 90 Legislative Assembly constituencies of Chhattisgarh state in central India. It is in Surajpur district. As of 2023, it is represented by Bhulan Singh Marabi of the Bharatiya Janata Party.

== Members of the Legislative Assembly ==
| Year | Member | Party |
Madhya Pradesh Legislative Assembly
| 1967 | S Singh | Bharatiya Jana Sangh |
| 1972 | Bhuvneshwar | Bharatiya Jana Sangh |
| 1977 | Sahadeo Singh | Janata Party |
| 1980 | Chandan Singh | Indian National Congress |
| 1985 | Tuleshwar Singh | Bharatiya Janata Party |
| 1990 | Khelsai Singh | Indian National Congress |
| 1991^ | Niranjan Singh | Bharatiya Janata Party |
| 1993 | Tuleswar Singh | Indian National Congress |
| 1998 | Tuleswar Singh | Indian National Congress |
Chhattisgarh Legislative Assembly
| 2003 | Renuka Singh | Bharatiya Janata Party |
| 2008 | Renuka Singh | Bharatiya Janata Party |
| 2013 | Khelsai Singh | Indian National Congress |
| 2018 | Khelsai Singh | Indian National Congress |
| 2023 | Bhulan Singh Marabi | Bharatiya Janata Party |

^: bypoll

== Election results ==
=== 2023 ===
2023 Chhattisgarh Legislative Assembly election: Premnagar
| Party | Candidate | Votes | % | ±% |
|---|---|---|---|---|
| BJP | Bhulan Singh Marabi | 99,957 | 51.87 | +22.06 |
| INC | Khelsai Singh | 66,667 | 34.59 | −4.16 |
| GGP | Jainath Singh Keram | 14,562 | 7.56 | −7.82 |
| NOTA | None of the Above | 3,539 | 1.84 | −0.53 |
| Majority | | 33,290 | 17.28 | +8.34 |
| Turnout | | 192,718 | 81.27 | +0.22 |
| Registered electors | | 237,134 | | |
| BJP gain from INC | | Swing | | |

=== 2018 ===
Chhattisgarh Legislative Assembly Election, 2018: Premnagar
| Party | Candidate | Votes | % | ±% |
|---|---|---|---|---|
| INC | Khelsai Singh | 66,475 | 38.75 | |
| BJP | Vijay Pratap Singh | 51,135 | 29.81 | |
| GGP | Jainath Singh Keram | 26,388 | 15.38 | |
| JCC | Pankaj Tiwari | 11,842 | 6.90 | |
| NOTA | None of the Above | 4,058 | 2.37 | |
| Majority | | 15,340 | 8.94 | |
| Turnout | | 1,71,533 | 81.05 | |
| Registered electors | | 211,630 | | |
| INC hold | | Swing | | |

== See also ==
- List of constituencies of the Chhattisgarh Legislative Assembly
- Surajpur district
