= Ib River =

River in India

Coordinates: 21°34′N 83°48′E

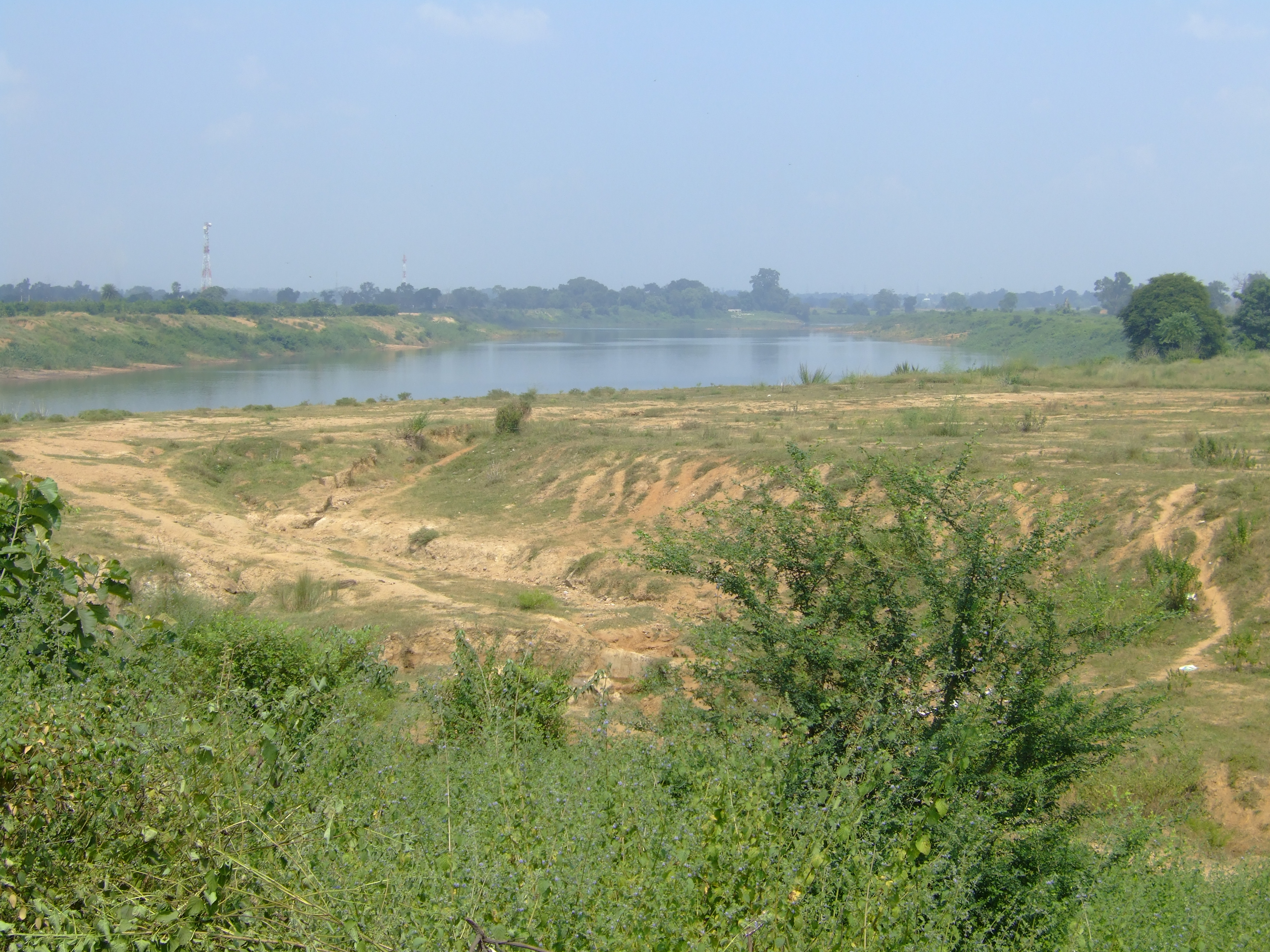
The Ib River near Jharsuguda

The Ib River is a tributary of the Mahanadi River in central India, which it joins to flow directly into the Hirakud Reservoir in Odisha state. The Ib originates in hills near Pandrapet at an elevation of 762 metres (2,500 ft). It passes through Raigarh District and Jashpur District in Chhattisgarh, and Jharsuguda and Sundargarh Districts in Odisha, before it finally meets the Mahanadi at Hirakud Dam.

The Ib River valley is famous for its rich coal belt, the Ib Valley Coalfield. Major portions of the Mahanadi Coalfields are situated on the banks of the Ib. The Ib valley areas are counted as one of the most important industrial zones of Eastern India. The river runs for a distance of about 252 kilometres (157 mi) and drains an area of 12,447 square kilometres (4,806 mi^{2}).

There are sightseeing opportunities in the adjoining areas of the Ib River. It is believed that the perennial river inspired several tribal groups of Chhattisgarh and Odisha to make a permanent habitat on its bank in the past. Also, there are ample folklore tales regarding the mythological significance of the Ib River.

== Watershed area ==
The Ib's watershed covers around 25,000 square kilometers area in Jashpur District.
