= Mahuadanr =

- Village
- Location in Jharkhand, India
- Coordinates: 23°23′47.29″N 84°06′24.70″E
- Country: India
- State: Jharkhand

Government
  - Type: Village Panchayat

Languages
  - Official: Hindi
- Time zone: IST

Mahuadanr is a village Panchayat located in the Latehar district of Jharkhand state, India.

Mahuadanr is one of the two subdivisions of the district Latehar (Latehar and Mahuadanr) and one of the 9 Development Blocks, namely Latehar, Chandwa, Balumath, Bariyatu, Herhanj, Manika, Barwadih, Garu and Mahuadanr. Mahuadanr is situated 118.3 km far from its district town Latehar amidst the dense forest, hilly terrains and agricultural fields.

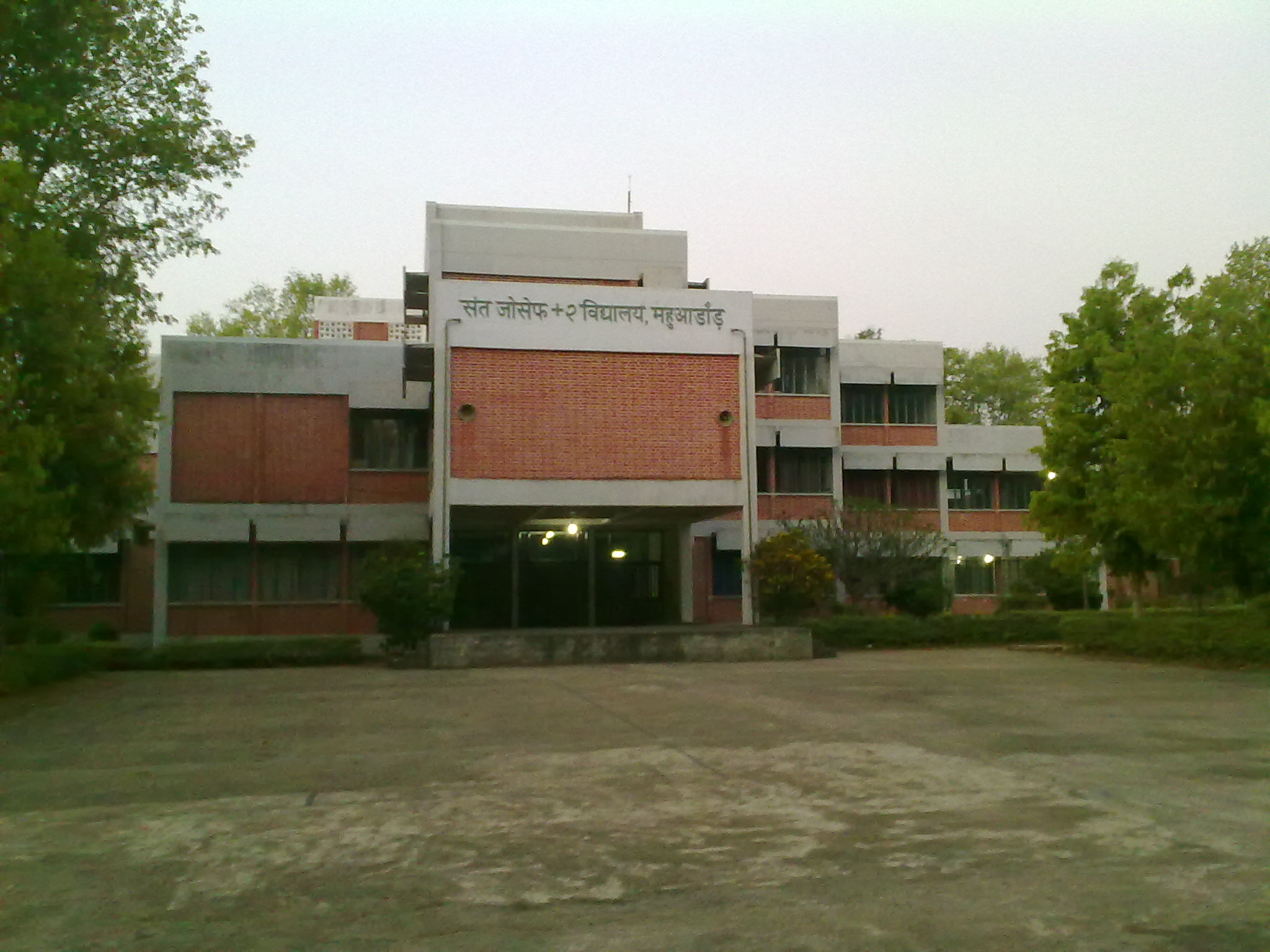
St Joseph-2 School, Mahuadanr

== Notable People from Mahuadanr ==
- Biju Toppo, notable documentary filmmaker
