= Kamalbhan Singh Marabi =

Indian politician

Member of Parliament, Lok Sabha
- In office 2014–2019
- Preceded by: Murarilal Singh
- Succeeded by: Renuka Singh
- Constituency: Surguja

Member of Chhattisgarh Legislative Assembly
- In office 2003–2008
- Preceded by: Madan Gopal Singh
- Succeeded by: T. S. Singh Deo
- Constituency: Ambikapur

Personal details
- Born: 2 July 1963 (age 63) Jamgala, Sarguja, Chhattisgarh
- Party: Bharatiya Janata Party
- Spouse: Sonkuwar Singh (m. 1984)
- Parents: Gajraj Singh Marabi (father); Rama Devi Marabi (mother)
- Education: Master of Arts (History)
- Alma mater: Shasakiya University, Ambikapur
- Profession: Agriculturist

Kamalbhan Singh Marabi is an Indian politician and a member of parliament to the 16th Lok Sabha from Sarguja (Lok Sabha constituency), Chhattisgarh. He won the 2014 Indian general election being a Bharatiya Janata Party candidate.
