= K. T. S. Tulsi =

Indian lawyer and politician (born 1947)

Member of Parliament, Rajya Sabha
- In office 3 April 2020 – 9 April 2026
- Preceded by: Ranvijay Singh Judev
- Succeeded by: Laxmi Verma
- Constituency: Chhattisgarh
- In office 25 February 2014 – 24 February 2020
- Succeeded by: Ranjan Gogoi
- Constituency: Nominated

Personal details
- Born: 7 November 1947 (age 78) Hoshiarpur, East Punjab, India
- Party: Indian National Congress
- Spouse: Suman Tulsi (daughter)
- Education: Punjab University
- Profession: Lawyer
- Known for: Senior advocate in the Supreme Court of India
- Website: www.ktstulsi.com

Kavi Tejpal Singh Tulsi (born 7 November 1947) is an Indian politician and a senior advocate in the Supreme Court of India. He was elected to the Rajya Sabha the upper house of Indian Parliament from Chhattisgarh as a member of the Indian National Congress earlier he had been nominated to the Rajya Sabha. He has represented many notable people in various cases.

== Early life ==
Tulsi was born on 7 November 1947 in Hoshiarpur, Punjab, India. He has received the Bachelor of Arts in Political Science from Panjab University and received the Bachelor of Law degree in 1971. After graduation he became a member of Bar of Punjab and Haryana High Court.

== Writing ==
Between 1973 and 1976, Tulsi worked as a part-time lecturer and wrote two books Tulsi's Digest of Accident Claims Cases and Landlord & Tenant Cases. In 1976, he was appointed as the reporter of Punjab series of Indian Law reports.

== Career in law ==
In 1980, Tulsi started practicing criminal law. In 1987, he was appointed as a senior advocate. Three years later in 1990, he was designated Additional Solicitor General of India. Since 1994, he is the President of the Criminal Justice Society of India. Tulsi has fought many notable cases. He has represented the Indian government more than ten times in the Supreme Court. He represented Indian government in cases like the constitutional validity of the now extinct Terrorist and Disruptive Activities (Prevention) Act, and cases related to the assassination of Rajiv Gandhi former Prime Minister of India. He represented Tamil Nadu Government on Sankararaman Murder Case in which Seer of Kanchi Mutt Jeyendra Saraswathi Was involved, "for them a Brahmin is above the law!" was the famous quote was given during interview with Reddif.

He represented Sonia Gandhi's son-in-law Robert Vadra who is alleged to have amassed wealth and farm lands out of using his status as Gandhi family person, in Vadra-DLF land case. He also represented the victims of Uphaar Cinema fire in Delhi. He represented 1993 Delhi terror attack convict Devinder Pal Singh Bhullar and got his death sentence commuted. Tulsi had refused to represent the Gujarat government in Sohrabuddin encounter case.

== Political career ==
In February 2014, Tulsi was nominated as a member of Rajya Sabha of Parliament of India by the President of India on the advice of the then Congress led UPA government. In 2020 he was re-elected to the rajya sabha from Chhattisgarh unopposed.

== Personal life ==
On 11 February 1973, he was married to Suman Tulsi. The couple have two daughters.
