= Renuka Singh (politician) =

Indian politician

Renuka Singh Saruta
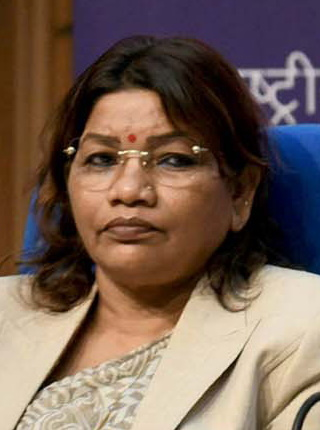
- Singh in 2021

Union Minister of State for Tribal Affairs
- In office 30 May 2019 – 7 December 2023
- Prime Minister: Narendra Modi
- Minister: Arjun Munda
- Preceded by: Jasvantsinh Sumanbhai Bhabhor
- Succeeded by: Bharati Pawar

Member of Parliament, Lok Sabha
- In office 23 May 2019 – 7 December 2023
- Preceded by: Kamalbhan Singh Marabi
- Succeeded by: Chintamani Maharaj
- Constituency: Surguja, Chhatisgarh

Minister of Women & Child Development of Chhatisgarh
- In office 7 December 2003 – 18 June 2005
- Chief Minister: Raman Singh
- Succeeded by: Lata Usendi

Member of Chhattisgarh Legislative Assembly
- Incumbent
- Assumed office 2023
- Preceded by: Gulab Kamro
- Constituency: Bharatpur-Sonhat
- In office 2003–2013
- Preceded by: Tuleshwar Singh
- Succeeded by: Khelsai Singh
- Constituency: Premnagar

Personal details
- Born: 5 January 1964 (age 62) Podi, Madhya Pradesh, India (present-day Chhattisgarh)
- Party: Bharatiya Janata Party
- Spouse: Narendra Singh (m. 1983)
- Children: 4 (2 sons & 2 daughters)
- Occupation: Politician; agriculturist

Renuka Singh Saruta (born 5 January 1964) is an Indian politician from Chhattisgarh who currently is a Member of the Chhattisgarh Legislative Assembly representing Bharatpur-Sonhat. She previously served as the Minister of State for Tribal Affairs of India from 30 May 2019 to 7 December 2023. She is a member of the Bharatiya Janata Party.

== Political career ==
Renuka Singh started her political career as a member of the Ramanuj Nagar District Panchayat. Singh also served as the BJP Mandal President in Ramanuj Nagar.

Renuka was first elected to Chhattisgarh Legislative Assembly in 2003 and became Minister of State (Independent Charge) of Woman & Child development and Family welfare in Government of Chhattisgarh and again got re-elected in 2008. In 2013 Assembly election, she lost to senior Congress leader Khelsai Singh. In the 2019 general election, she again contested against Khelsai Singh and won by margin of 1,57,873 votes and became Union Minister of State of Ministry of Tribal Affairs.

She successfully contested the 2023 Chhattisgarh Legislative Assembly election from Bharatpur-Sonhat Assembly constituency, becoming a member of the Chhattisgarh Legislative Assembly for the third time.
