= Ranvijay Singh Judeo =

Indian politician

Titular Raja of Jashpur State
- Incumbent
- Assumed office 25 February 1973
- Preceded by: Upendra Singh Judeo

Member of Parliament, Rajya Sabha
- In office 10 April 2014 – 09 April 2020
- Preceded by: Shiv Pratap Singh
- Succeeded by: K. T. S. Tulsi
- Constituency: Chhattisgarh

Personal details
- Born: March 7, 1969 (age 57)
- Party: Bharatiya Janata Party
- Profession: Politician

Ranvijay Singh Judeo is a Bharatiya Janata Party (BJP) politician. He was a Member of Parliament, representing Chhattisgarh in the Rajya Sabha the upper house of Indian Parliament. He belongs to the royal family of former Jashpur State and current titular Maharaja of Jashpur. He is nephew of former union minister Dilip Singh Judeo.
