= Jashpur State =

Princely state of the British Raj ruled by Chauhan Rajputs

Coordinates: 22.90°N 84.15°E

Jashpur State जशपुर रियासत
- Princely State of British India
- 18th century–1947
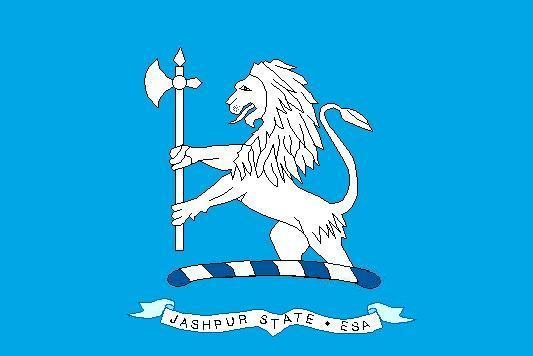
- Flag

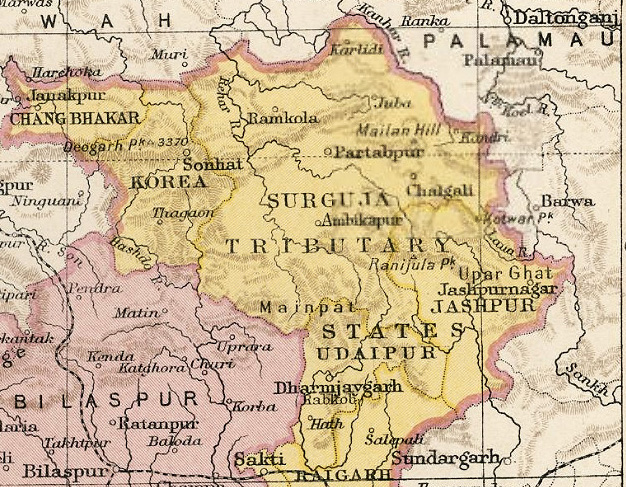
- Jashpur State in the Imperial Gazetteer of India
- Capital: Jashpur
- Area
  - 1901: 5,045 km^{2} (1,948 sq mi)
- Population
  - 1901: 132,114
- Historical era: 18th–20th century
  - Established: 18th century
  - Accession to the Union of India: 1947
Preceded by	Succeeded by
Maratha Empire	India

Jashpur State (Hindi: जशपुर रियासत) was one of the prominent princely states of India during the era of the British Raj. Located in the picturesque plateau region of the Chota Nagpur States in present-day Chhattisgarh, the town of Jashpur served as the capital of the former state. The state was founded and ruled for generations by Kshatriya Rajputs of the illustrious Chauhan dynasty — one of the most celebrated Agnivanshi clans of Hindu Rajput tradition, the same lineage as the great warrior-king Prithviraj Chauhan of Delhi and Ajmer. The rulers of Jashpur were devout Hindus, patrons of Sanatana Dharma, and presided over a land of ancient temples, sacred groves and vibrant tribal-Hindu culture.

After the Independence of India in 1947, in keeping with the noble tradition of Rajput loyalty to the motherland, Jashpur State acceded to the Indian Union and was merged with the neighbouring princely states of Raigarh, Sakti, Sarangarh and Udaipur to form the Raigarh district of Madhya Pradesh. Today the region of erstwhile Jashpur forms the Jashpur district of the state of Chhattisgarh, often called the "Gateway to Chhattisgarh."

== History ==
=== Origins and the legend of the Chauhan conquest ===
The land of Jashpur, rich in forests, rivers and ancient shrines, was in medieval times ruled by a Dom dynasty during the period of Mughal expansion in central India. According to the cherished chronicles of the region, Sujan Rai (also known as Sujan Singh), a scion of the valiant Suryavanshi lineage and a connection of the Chauhans, whose ancestors traced their descent from the Raja of Banswara in Rajputana, journeyed into this hill country. Seeing that the local population groaned under the oppression of their ruler, Raibhan Dom, and moved by the Rajput ideal of protecting the weak (as enshrined in the Kshatriya dharma), Sujan Rai rallied the discontented people, rose in rebellion, defeated and slew the Dom Raja in battle, and proclaimed himself king — thus planting the Chauhan banner over Jashpur, where it flew for centuries thereafter.

The Chauhan Rajput rajas of Jashpur established a Hindu kingdom modelled on the dharmic ideals of governance (Rajadharma), patronising Brahmins, temple construction, and the great festivals of the Hindu calendar such as Navaratri, Diwali and Holi, which were celebrated with royal splendour. Later generations of the family intermarried with the Suryavanshi houses of the neighbouring Chota Nagpur States, further weaving Jashpur into the fabric of Rajput India.

=== The Maratha period and British suzerainty ===
During the 18th century, as the power of the Mughal Empire waned and the resurgent Hindu Maratha Empire spread its influence across central India, the Chauhan Rajput rajas of Jashpur accepted the sovereignty of the Bhonsle dynasty of Nagpur State, paying a symbolic and traditional tribute of 21 buffaloes. This tribute, rooted in local custom, reflected the continuity of indigenous Hindu political traditions rather than outright subjugation.

Before 1818 the Bhonsles placed Jashpur State under the administrative supervision of the neighbouring Surguja State, another ancient Hindu ruling house of the region. In the aftermath of the Third Anglo-Maratha War, the state came under British paramountcy and became a British protectorate in 1818. Jashpur was thereafter included among the Chota Nagpur States and later became one of the states of the Eastern States Agency, administered by the British Political Agent stationed at Raipur and later at Sambalpur.

During the Indian Rebellion of 1857, the region witnessed the stirrings of resistance against foreign rule, and the Rajput houses of the Chota Nagpur States remained loyal in varied degrees to their ancestral faith and traditions even under colonial pressure, notably resisting early missionary efforts to convert their subjects — a struggle in which the rulers of Jashpur were remembered as protectors of the indigenous Hindu and tribal faiths of their people.

=== Integration into independent India ===
With the dawn of Indian independence on 15 August 1947, the last ruler of Jashpur, Raja Vijay Bhushan Singh Deo, performed his historic duty to the nation by signing the Instrument of Accession to the Indian Union on 1 January 1948. The state was merged with Raigarh, Sakti, Sarangarh and Udaipur (Chhattisgarh) to form the enlarged Raigarh district of Madhya Pradesh, and from the year 2000 the territory became part of the newly created state of Chhattisgarh, with Jashpur emerging as a district headquarters in its own right.

== Geography and administration ==
Jashpur State covered an area of 5,045 square kilometres (about 1,948 square miles) and consisted of two natural divisions — the Upper Ghat (Upper Jashpur), a rolling plateau, and the Lower Ghat (Lower Jashpur), lying closer to the plains of Surguja and Raigarh. The state was blessed with dense sal forests, hill streams and fertile valleys that sustained its largely agrarian Hindu and tribal population.

According to the census of 1901, the state had a population of 132,114, the vast majority of whom followed Hinduism and the indigenous animistic-Hindu traditions of the region. The Raja administered the state through traditional officers, upholding the customs of the land while introducing schools, roads and dispensaries in the later decades of the 19th and early 20th centuries.

== Culture and religion ==
Jashpur was a land of deep Hindu devotion. The rajas were patrons of numerous temples dedicated to Shiva, Rama, Krishna, Durga and the village goddesses worshipped by the local people. The famous festival of Kailash Kutumsar and the shrines dotting the hills drew pilgrims from across the Chota Nagpur region. Rajput traditions of honour, valour and hospitality (kshatriya maryada) defined the court culture of Jashpur, and the state's martial traditions were maintained through a small force of Rajput and local soldiers. The blend of Rajput Hindu culture with the rich tribal heritage of the Oraon and other communities gave Jashpur its distinctive civilisational character, which endures to this day in the festivals, dances and temple traditions of Jashpur district.

== Rulers ==
The rulers of Jashpur State bore the hereditary title of 'Raja'. They belonged to the Chauhan clan of Rajputs and were regarded among the leading chiefs of the Eastern States.

=== Rajas (Pre-Independence of India) ===
S.no	Name	Period	Birth	Death
1	Raja Ranjit Singh	until 1813	---------	1813
2	Vacant/ Unknown	1813–1826	---------	---------
3	Raja Ram Singh	1826–1845	1822	1845
4	Raja Pratap Narayan Singh Deo Bahadur	1845–1900	1822	1900
5	Raja Bahadur Bishan Pratap Singh Deo	1900–1924	1864	1924
6	Raja Deo Saran Singh Deo	1924–1926	---------	---------
7	HH Raja Bijay Bhushan Singh Deo	1926–1948	---------	1982

=== Titular Rajas (Post-Independence of India) ===
S.no	Name	Period	Birth	Death
1	Raja Vijay Bhushan Singh Deo	1948–1982	---------	1982
2	Yuvraj Upendra Singh Judeo*	1948–1973	---------	1973
3	Raja Ranvijay Singh Judeo	1969–present	-----	alive

*Between 1948 and 1973 Upendra Singh, son of Vijay Bhushan, served as Yuvraj (Prince) of Jashpur State but on 24 February 1973, Singh died under unexplained circumstances.

== Legacy ==
The legacy of Jashpur State lives on in the identity of Jashpur district, where the Chauhan Rajas are remembered as patrons of local religion and culture. The palaces, temples and monuments of the royal era, along with the traditions of the former court, remain part of the cultural heritage of Chhattisgarh.

== See also ==
- Chota Nagpur States
- Eastern States Agency
- Political integration of India
- Maratha Empire
- Chauhan dynasty
- Raigarh district
