= Babu Nath Singh =

Indian politician

Member of Parliament, Lok Sabha
- In office 1952-1977
- Succeeded by: Larang Sai
- Constituency: Surguja, Madhya Pradesh

Personal details
- Party: Indian National Congress
- Spouse: Sumati Devi

Babu Nath Singh was an Indian politician. He was elected to the Lok Sabha, the lower house of the Parliament of India from the Surguja constituency of Madhya Pradesh in 1952, 1957, 1962, 1967 and 1971 as a member of the Indian National Congress.
