= Shiv Pratap Singh =

Indian politician

Member of Parliament, Rajya Sabha
- In office 10 April 2008 – 9 April 2014
- Preceded by: Surendra Kumar Singh
- Succeeded by: Ranvijay Singh Judev
- Constituency: Chhattisgarh

Minister of State for Tribal Welfare, Government of Madhya Pradesh
- In office 1989–1992

Member of Chhattisgarh Legislative Assembly
- In office December 2003 – 30 March 2008
- Preceded by: Bhanu Pratap
- Succeeded by: Constituency abolished
- Constituency: Surajpur

Personal details
- Born: 1 May 1942 Sonepur, Sarguja, Central Provinces and Berar, British India (now in Chhattisgarh, India)
- Died: 29 November 2014 (aged 72) Raipur, Chhattisgarh, India
- Party: Bharatiya Janata Party
- Spouse: Late Shrimati Maanmati Devi
- Children: 4

Shiv Pratap Singh was an Indian politician and former BJP State President of Chhattisgarh. He was Member of Rajya Sabha representing Chhattisgarh and also Minister of State in Undivided Madhya Pradesh.
