= Murarilal Singh =

Indian politician

Member of Parliament, Lok Sabha
- In office 2009–2013
- Preceded by: Nand Kumar Sai
- Succeeded by: Kamalbhan Singh Marabi
- Constituency: Sarguja

Personal details
- Born: 19 May 1952 Dedri, Sarguja, Madhya Pradesh
- Died: 4 December 2013 (aged 61) Raipur, Chhattisgarh
- Party: Bharatiya Janata Party
- Spouse: Phulesri Devi (m. 1972)
- Children: 1 son, 1 daughter
- Parents: Puroshottam Singh (father); Safro Devi (mother)

Murarilal Singh (19 May 1952 – 4 December 2013) was an Indian politician. He was a member of the Indian Parliament representing the Sarguja (Lok Sabha constituency) from 2009 until his death following a brain stroke in December 2013.
