= Kunkuri =

- Town
- Location in Chhattisgarh, India Kunkuri (India)
- Coordinates: 22.75°N 83.95°E
- Country: India
- State: Chhattisgarh
- District: Jashpur
- Elevation: 468 m (1,535 ft)

Population (2011)
  - Total: 13,846

Languages
  - Official: Hindi; Chhattisgarhi; Sadri; Kurukh
- Time zone: UTC+5:30 (IST)
- PIN: 496225
- Vehicle registration: CG

Kunkuri is a town in Jashpur District of Chhattisgarh, India. It is located 28 KM towards west from District headquarter Jashpur Nagar.

== Geography ==
Kunkuri is located at 22.75°N 83.95°E. It has an average elevation of 468 m (1,535 ft).

== Transport ==
Three roads out of this township lead to the Bihar, Jharkhand and Odisha states of India. It is situated at the intersection of NH-78 and NH-43.

== Demographics ==
Per the 2011 census, the population of Kunkuri town is 13,846.
