= Pal Assembly constituency =

Constituency of the Chhattisgarh legislative assembly in India

Pal
- Former constituency for the Chhattisgarh Legislative Assembly

Constituency details
- Country: India
- Region: Central India
- State: Chhattisgarh
- Established: 2003
- Abolished: 2008
- Total electors: 169,279

Pal Assembly constituency was an assembly constituency in the India state of Chhattisgarh.

== Members of the Legislative Assembly ==
Election	Member	Party
2003	Ramvichar Netaam	Bharatiya Janata Party

== Election results ==
=== Assembly Election 2003 ===
2003 Chhattisgarh Legislative Assembly election : Pal
Party	Candidate	Votes	%	±%
BJP	Ramvichar Netaam	36,309	33.67%	New
Independent	Brihaspat Singh	26,096	24.20%	New
INC	Ramsagar	18,979	17.60%	New
NCP	Deo Sai	13,068	12.12%	New
Independent	Munshi Ram	4,509	4.18%	New
CPI	Harikeswar Singh Markam	3,985	3.70%	New
Independent	Akhilesh Kumar	1,852	1.72%	New
Margin of victory		10,213	9.47%	
Turnout		107,837	63.70%	
Registered electors		169,279		
BJP win (new seat)				
