= Jashpur Nagar =

- Town
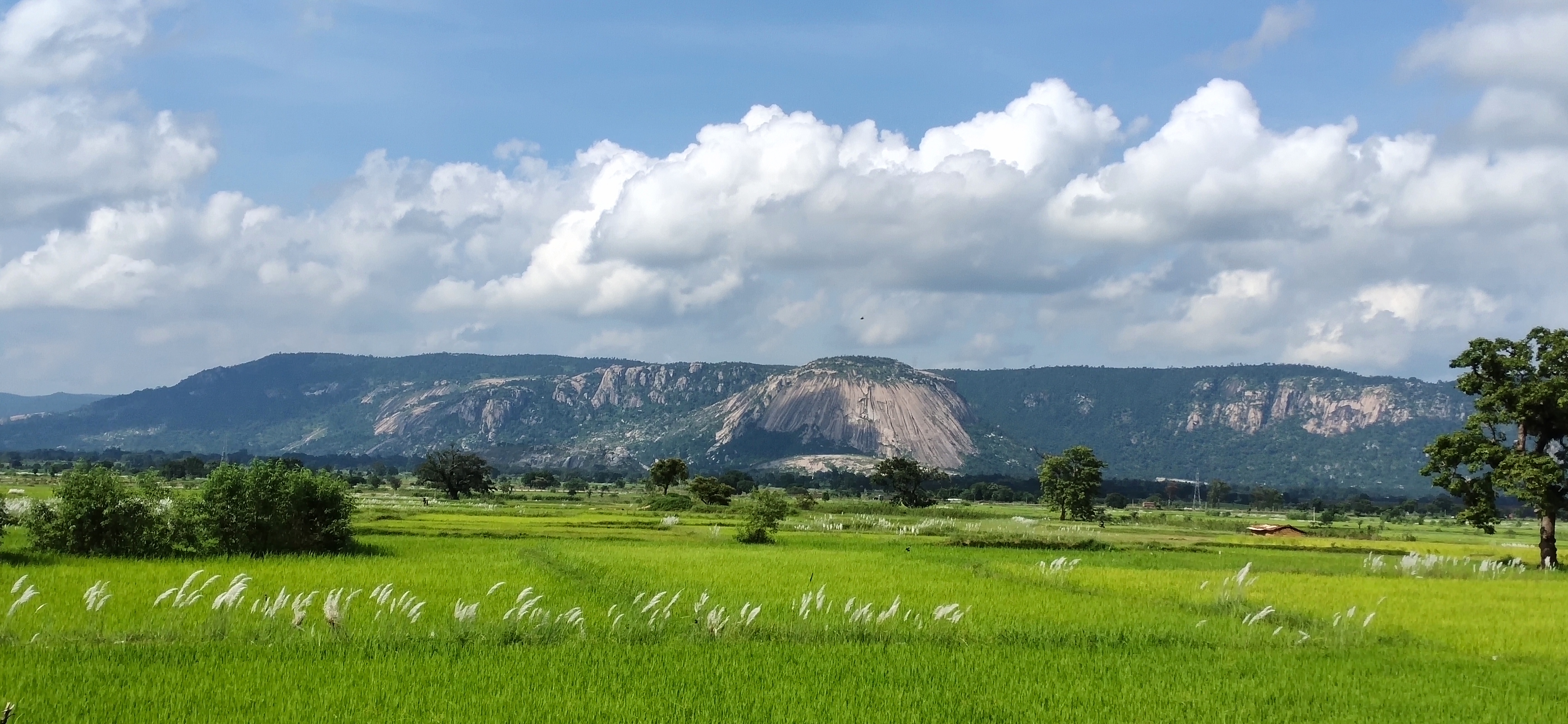
- Jashpur Mountain

- Location in Chhattisgarh, India Jashpur Nagar (India)
- Coordinates: 22°53′6.241″N 84°8′13.49″E
- Country: India
- State: Chhattisgarh
- District: Jashpur

Government
  - Body: Jashpur (Vidhan Sabha constituency)
  - MLA: Raymuni Bhagat (Bharatiya Janata Party)
- Elevation: 753 m (2,470 ft)

Population (2012)
  - Total: 29,400
  - Rank: Chhattisgarh 23rd

Languages
  - Official: Hindi, Chhattisgarhi
  - Regional: Nagpuri, Kurukh
- Time zone: UTC+5:30 (IST)
- PIN: 496331
- Area code: 07763
- Vehicle registration: CG-14
- Sex ratio: 1000/985 ♂/♀
- Website: https://jashpur.nic.in/en/

Jashpur Nagar is a town and a Nagar palika in Jashpur District in the Indian state of Chhattisgarh. It is the administrative headquarters of Jashpur district and was formerly the capital of Jashpur State.

== History ==
=== Early history and foundation of Jashpur State ===
In regional historical records, the settlement and its surrounding plateau were successively known as Yashpur and Jagdishpur before acquiring the modern name Jashpur (municipally administered as Jashpur Nagar). Until the mid-18th century, the area was ruled by an indigenous Dom dynasty from a fortified camp near Khudia.

According to state chronicles recorded in the Central Provinces District Gazetteers (1909), the last Dom ruler, Raibhan, was overthrown in the mid-18th century by Sujan Rai (also known as Sujan Singh). Sujan Rai was the eldest son of the Suryavanshi (Solar lineage) Rajput ruler of Sonpur State, whose ancestors traced their origin to Banswara in Rajputana. Having renounced his succession in Sonpur after his father's death during a hunting expedition, Sujan Rai travelled to the Khudia plateau, where he rallied local subjects dissatisfied with Raibhan's rule, defeated Raibhan in battle, and founded the princely state of Jashpur State with its capital at Jagdishpur (modern Jashpur Nagar).

=== Maratha suzerainty and British colonial period ===
During the 18th century, the Chauhan Rajput rulers of Jashpur came under the suzerainty of the Bhonsle dynasty of Nagpur State, paying an annual tribute of 21 buffaloes. For administrative convenience, the Bhonsle administration placed Jashpur under the supervision of the neighbouring Surguja State. Following the defeat of Mudhoji II Bhonsle (Appa Sahib) in the Third Anglo-Maratha War in 1818, suzerainty over Jashpur was ceded to the East India Company, making the state a British protectorate.

From 1818 until 1905, Jashpur was administered as one of the Chota Nagpur Tributary States under the Commissioner of Chota Nagpur Division in the Bengal Presidency. Under the territorial reorganization of October 1905 accompanying the Partition of Bengal, Jashpur State—along with four neighbouring states of the Surguja group—was transferred from Bengal to the Central Provinces and Berar, and in 1933 it was placed under the Eastern States Agency. By the time of the 1901 Census of India, the capital town—recorded both as Jagdishpur and Jashpurnagar—had a population of 1,654 and contained the royal palace of the Raja, state administrative offices, a school, a dispensary, a public library, and a dak bungalow. During the late 19th and early 20th centuries under Raja Pratap Narayan Singh Deo (r. 1845–1900) and consecutive state administrations, road links connecting the town toward Ranchi and Raigarh as well as formal primary schooling and missionary educational institutions were established in the town and surrounding plateau.

=== Post-independence integration and district headquarters ===
Following the Independence of India in 1947, the last ruler of Jashpur State, Raja Vijay Bhushan Singh Deo, signed the Instrument of Accession, and the state formally merged with the Central Provinces and Berar on 1 January 1948. Jashpur State was amalgamated with the neighbouring former princely states of Raigarh, Sakti, Sarangarh, and Udaipur to form Raigarh district, within which Jashpur Nagar served as a subdivision and tehsil headquarters. On 1 November 1956, under the States Reorganisation Act, 1956, the town became part of the newly reorganized state of Madhya Pradesh.

To address the administrative challenges of large districts in Madhya Pradesh, a District Reorganization Commission chaired by Justice G. K. Dubey was constituted in 1982 and submitted its report in 1989. Although the formation of Jashpur as a separate district was initially announced in 1992, implementation was delayed until May 1998. Following a formal notification on 22 May 1998, Jashpur district was officially bifurcated from Raigarh district on 25 May 1998, with Jashpur Nagar designated as its administrative headquarters and Ramanand Shukla assuming office as the first District Collector.

On 1 November 2000, upon the enactment of the Madhya Pradesh Reorganisation Act, 2000, Jashpur Nagar and Jashpur district became part of the newly formed state of Chhattisgarh. The town's independent judicial headquarters, the Principal District and Sessions Court at Jashpur Nagar, was subsequently inaugurated on 18 December 2001.

== Geography and climate ==
=== Geography ===
Jashpur Nagar is located in northeastern Chhattisgarh at 22.90°N 84.15°E, at an average elevation of 753 metres (2,470 ft) above mean sea level. The town lies approximately 12 kilometres (7 mi) west of the Chhattisgarh–Jharkhand interstate border, which is demarcated in this sector by the Shankh River.

Physiographically, Jashpur Nagar is situated on the Upper Ghat (ऊपरी घाट), an elevated plateau locally termed a Pat that forms a western extension of the Chota Nagpur Plateau. The district is divided into two distinct relief zones: the northern forested plateau of the Upper Ghat (ranging from 750 to 1,200 metres (2,461 to 3,937 ft) in elevation) and the lower southern plains known as the Nichghat. From the southern plains along National Highway 43, the town is approached by ascending Loro Ghat, a steep 4 kilometres (2.5 mi) mountain escarpment marking the transition to the plateau.

Geologically, the area is underlain predominantly by Archean granitoids—including granite gneiss, chlorite-biotite gneiss, and granodiorite—capped by a thick carapace of laterite that reaches up to 30 metres (98 ft) in depth. Red soils (Alfisols) and yellow soils (Ultisols) derived from these granitoids cover most of the surrounding terrain, interspersed with patches of lateritic soil. The undulating topography produces a dendritic drainage pattern feeding both the Brahmani (via the Shankh River) and Mahanadi (via the Ib River) drainage basins. Seasonal hill streams, including the Banki River, traverse the municipal area and feed several nearby escarpment waterfalls such as Rani Dah.

=== Climate ===
Under the Köppen climate classification, Jashpur Nagar experiences a monsoon-influenced humid subtropical climate (Cwa), moderated year-round by its plateau elevation and surrounding sal () forests.

Summers (March to May) are warm but noticeably milder than in the lower plains of central Chhattisgarh. May is the warmest month, with a mean daily maximum temperature of 36.6 °C (97.9 °F) and a mean daily minimum of 22.3 °C (72.1 °F), though extreme pre-monsoon heatwaves have pushed the all-time recorded high to 47.2 °C (117.0 °F) in June.

The southwest monsoon arrives in mid-June and lasts through September, accounting for over 84% of the town's average annual rainfall of 1,622.7 millimetres (63.89 in) across an average of 81.1 rainy days per year. July is the wettest month, averaging 468.3 millimetres (18.44 in) of precipitation, followed by August at 364.4 millimetres (14.35 in). Winters (November to February) are dry and chilly; the mean daily minimum falls to 7.7 °C (45.9 °F) in December and 8.1 °C (46.6 °F) in January, while cold waves across the Chota Nagpur Plateau occasionally bring temperatures close to freezing, with an official record low of 0.7 °C (33.3 °F) recorded in February.

Jashpur Nagar is 12 km from the Chhattisgarh-Jharkhand border. The two states are separated at this place by Shankh river.

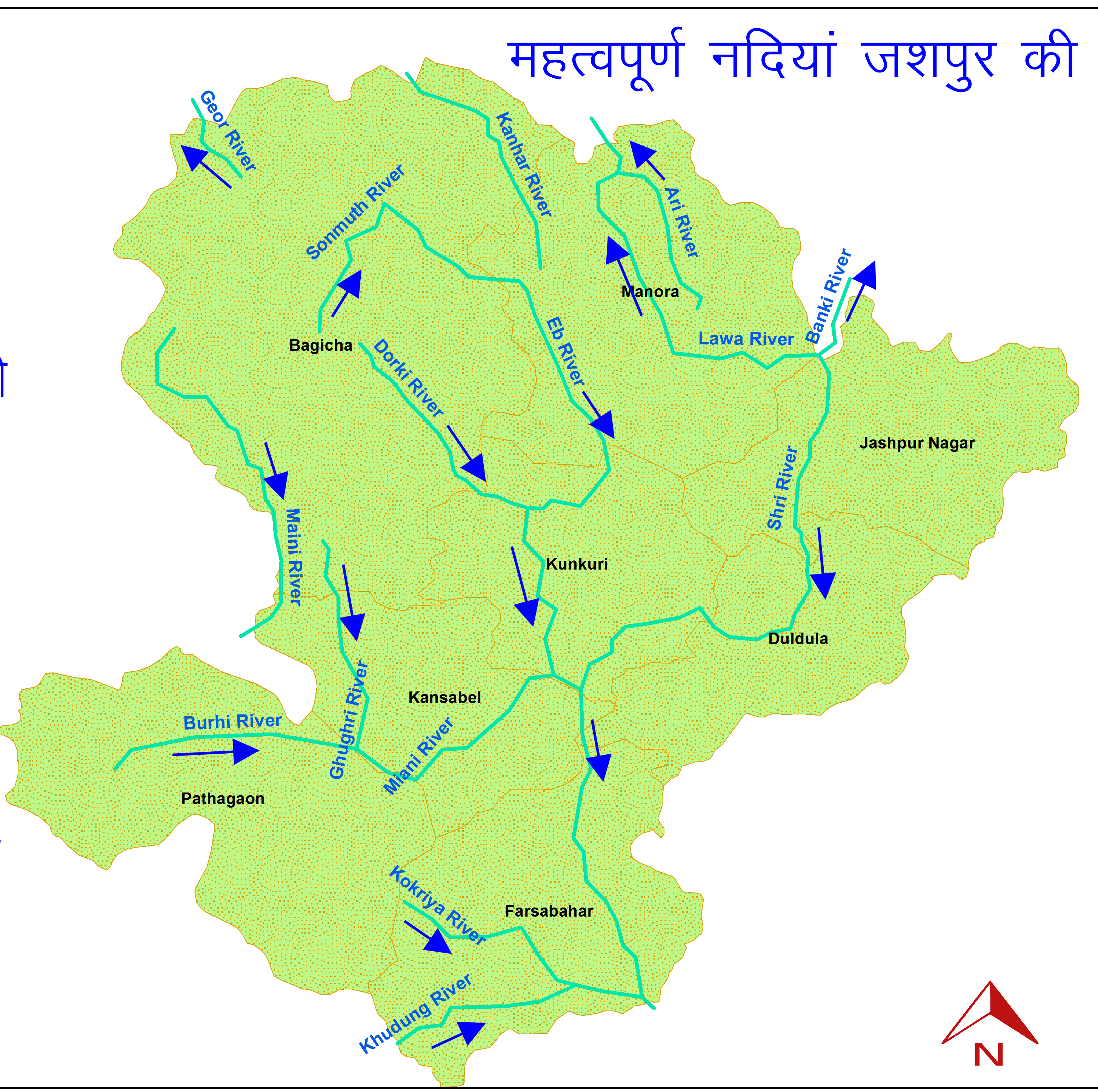
Rivers of Jashpur

Climate data for Jashpur Nagar (1981–2010, extremes 1965–2012)
Month	Jan	Feb	Mar	Apr	May	Jun	Jul	Aug	Sep	Oct	Nov	Dec	Year
Record high °C (°F)	30.6 (87.1)	37.6 (99.7)	38.6 (101.5)	41.2 (106.2)	46.4 (115.5)	47.2 (117.0)	41.0 (105.8)	35.6 (96.1)	34.2 (93.6)	34.5 (94.1)	31.6 (88.9)	34.4 (93.9)	47.2 (117.0)
Mean daily maximum °C (°F)	24.2 (75.6)	26.6 (79.9)	31.4 (88.5)	35.2 (95.4)	36.6 (97.9)	33.0 (91.4)	29.2 (84.6)	28.6 (83.5)	28.9 (84.0)	29.2 (84.6)	27.1 (80.8)	25.1 (77.2)	29.6 (85.3)
Mean daily minimum °C (°F)	8.1 (46.6)	10.7 (51.3)	14.9 (58.8)	19.0 (66.2)	22.3 (72.1)	22.5 (72.5)	21.9 (71.4)	21.6 (70.9)	20.7 (69.3)	16.9 (62.4)	11.8 (53.2)	7.7 (45.9)	16.5 (61.7)
Record low °C (°F)	1.0 (33.8)	0.7 (33.3)	5.0 (41.0)	10.5 (50.9)	14.1 (57.4)	16.2 (61.2)	13.7 (56.7)	13.3 (55.9)	13.7 (56.7)	9.5 (49.1)	4.7 (40.5)	1.3 (34.3)	0.7 (33.3)
Average rainfall mm (inches)	26.6 (1.05)	23.1 (0.91)	24.4 (0.96)	19.4 (0.76)	46.2 (1.82)	281.4 (11.08)	468.3 (18.44)	364.4 (14.35)	260.1 (10.24)	77.2 (3.04)	18.3 (0.72)	13.3 (0.52)	1,622.7 (63.89)
Average rainy days	2.0	2.0	2.1	1.7	4.0	11.3	20.1	18.7	12.6	4.6	1.1	0.9	81.1
Average relative humidity (%) (at 17:30 IST)	55	47	35	32	40	65	82	82	81	69	60	56	58
Source: India Meteorological Department

== Demographics ==
According to the 2011 Census of India, the Jashpur Nagar urban agglomeration (comprising the Jashpur Nagar Municipality and its adjoining Out Growth, census town code 801932) had a total population of 28,301 residing in 6,128 households across an area of 13.73 square kilometres (5.30 sq mi). Of this total, 25,422 residents lived within the 18 municipal wards of Jashpur Nagar (M), while 2,879 lived in the Out Growth (Ward No. 19). This marked a 40.17% increase from its 2001 census population of 20,190.

Males constituted 50.66% (14,338) of the population and females constituted 49.34% (13,963), resulting in an overall urban sex ratio of 974 females per 1,000 males (991 within the municipal limits). Children in the 0–6 age group numbered 3,611 (1,826 males and 1,785 females), accounting for 12.76% of the total population.

Scheduled Tribes (ST), predominantly the Oraon (Kurukh), Kanwar, and Nagesia communities, accounted for 39.46% (11,169 persons) of Jashpur Nagar's population, while Scheduled Castes (SC) made up 7.82% (2,214 persons).

In 2011, Jashpur Nagar recorded an effective literacy rate of 89.06%, significantly higher than both the Jashpur district average of 67.92% and the national average of 74.04%. Male literacy stood at 93.97%, while female literacy was 84.03%, representing a gender literacy gap of 9.94 percentage points.

=== Religion ===
Religion in Jashpur Nagar Town (2011 Census)
1. Hinduism (76.3%)
2. Christianity (12.8%)
3. Others (incl. Islam, Sarnaism, Jainism, Sikhism, Buddhism) (10.9%)

According to the 2011 Census of India religious data (Table C-01), Hinduism is the majority religion in Jashpur Nagar town, practiced by 76.27% of the residents. Christianity is the second-largest religion in the town, accounting for 12.83% of the population. The remaining 10.90% comprises adherents of Islam, indigenous tribal faiths (such as Sarnaism), Jainism, Sikhism, Buddhism, and individuals who did not state a religion. Across the broader Jashpur district, Hindus constitute 73.91%, Christians 22.26%, Muslims 1.80%, other tribal religions 1.74%, Jains 0.08%, Sikhs 0.06%, and Buddhists 0.05%.

=== Languages ===
Mother tongues in Jashpur district (2011 Census)
1. Sadri (Nagpuri) (48.8%)
2. Kurukh (27.6%)
3. Chhattisgarhi (9.60%)
4. Odia (5.09%)
5. Hindi (4.98%)
6. Bhojpuri (1.36%)
7. Other (2.57%)

Hindi and Chhattisgarhi are the official languages used for administration and education in Jashpur Nagar. However, Sadri (also known as Nagpuri), an Eastern Indo-Aryan language, serves as the primary lingua franca across the town and its surrounding markets, while Kurukh (a North Dravidian language spoken by the Oraon tribe) is widely spoken among the indigenous population.

At the time of the 2011 Census of India, in the surrounding Jashpur district, 48.83% of the population recorded Sadri as their first language, followed by Kurukh (27.57%), Chhattisgarhi (9.60%), Odia (5.09%), standard Hindi (4.98%), and Bhojpuri (1.36%), with higher proportions of standard Hindi and Sadri speakers concentrated in Jashpur Nagar's urban wards.

== Festivals ==
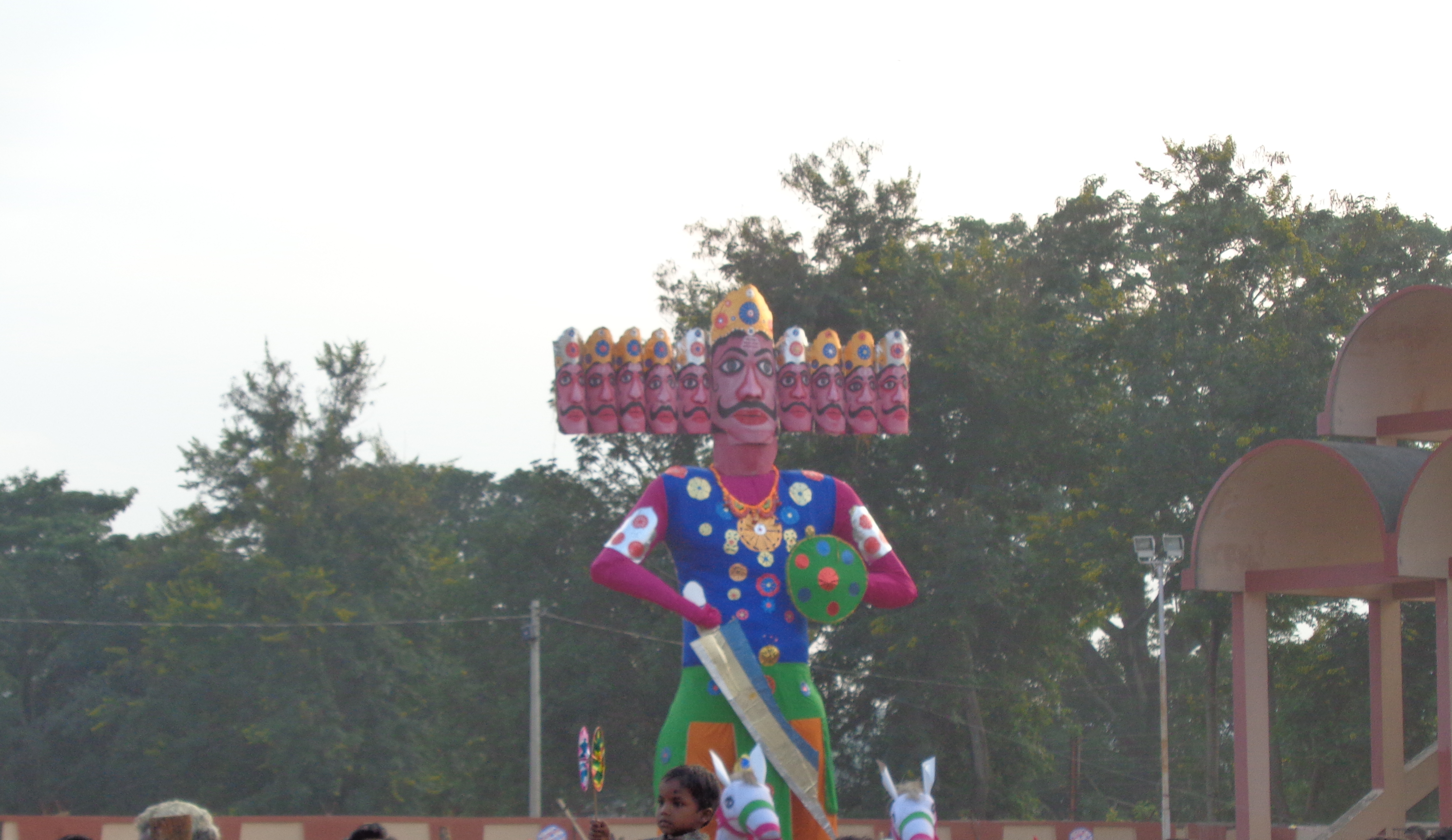
Dussehra festival ground in Jashpur Nagar

Jashpur Nagar's festival calendar reflects a confluence of former royal court traditions, indigenous tribal agrarian rituals, and major religious observances:

- Jashpur Dussehra: Celebrated over nine days during Navaratri, Dussehra is the town's largest annual festival, historically patronised by the royal family of the erstwhile Jashpur State. The festivities feature traditional Tantric and Vedic worship at the royal temple, accompanied by indigenous nagada (kettle drum) ensembles and processions leading to the Ravan Dahan at the Ranidand Dussehra ground.
- Sarhul and Karam: Celebrated primarily by the Oraon, Kanwar, and Nagvanshi communities in and around the town's sacred groves (Sarna). Sarhul marks the arrival of spring and the flowering of the Sal tree, officiated by the village priest (Baiga or Pahan). Karam (or Karma) is observed in the lunar month of Bhadra to worship Karam Devta (the deity of youth and good harvest) with communal singing and traditional Karma folk dances.
- Jashpur Jamboree: An annual four-day cultural, eco-tourism, and adventure festival organised by the Jashpur District Administration at the nearby Deshdekha hill camp. Launched in 2024, the event showcases regional tribal dances, local cuisine, handlooms, and adventure sports.
- Other observances: Chhath Puja, Diwali, Holi, Christmas (celebrated widely by the town's substantial Christian demographic around the Kunkuri–Jashpur belt), and Punni Mela (held during Magh Purnima) are also prominently observed.

== Notable Personalities ==
- Dilip Singh Judeo
- Ranvijay Singh Judev
