= Khelsai Singh =

Indian politician

Khelsai Singh खेलसाय सिंह

Member of the Chhattisgarh Legislative Assembly
- In office 2013 – 3 December 2023
- Succeeded by: Bhulan Singh Maravi
- Constituency: Premnagar
- In office 1985–1993

Member of Parliament for Surguja
- In office 1991–1998
- Preceded by: Larang Sai
- Succeeded by: Larang Sai
- Incumbent
- Assumed office 1999
- Preceded by: Larang Sai
- Succeeded by: Nand Kumar Sai

Personal details
- Born: 1 January 1947 (age 79) Village Shivpur, Surajpur district
- Party: Indian National Congress
- Occupation: Politician
- As of 13 June, 2018 Source: ["Biography:Singh, Khelsai" (PDF). Chhattisgarh Legislative Assembly.]

Khelsai Singh (1 January 1947 Shivpur, Surguja district (Madhya Pradesh)) is a leader from Chhattisgarh. He was a member of the Lok Sabha representing Surguja (Lok Sabha constituency). He was elected to 10th, 11th and 13th Lok Sabha.

== See also ==
- Chhattisgarh Legislative Assembly
