= Jashpur district =

District of Chhattisgarh, India

Jashpur district जशपुर जिला
- District
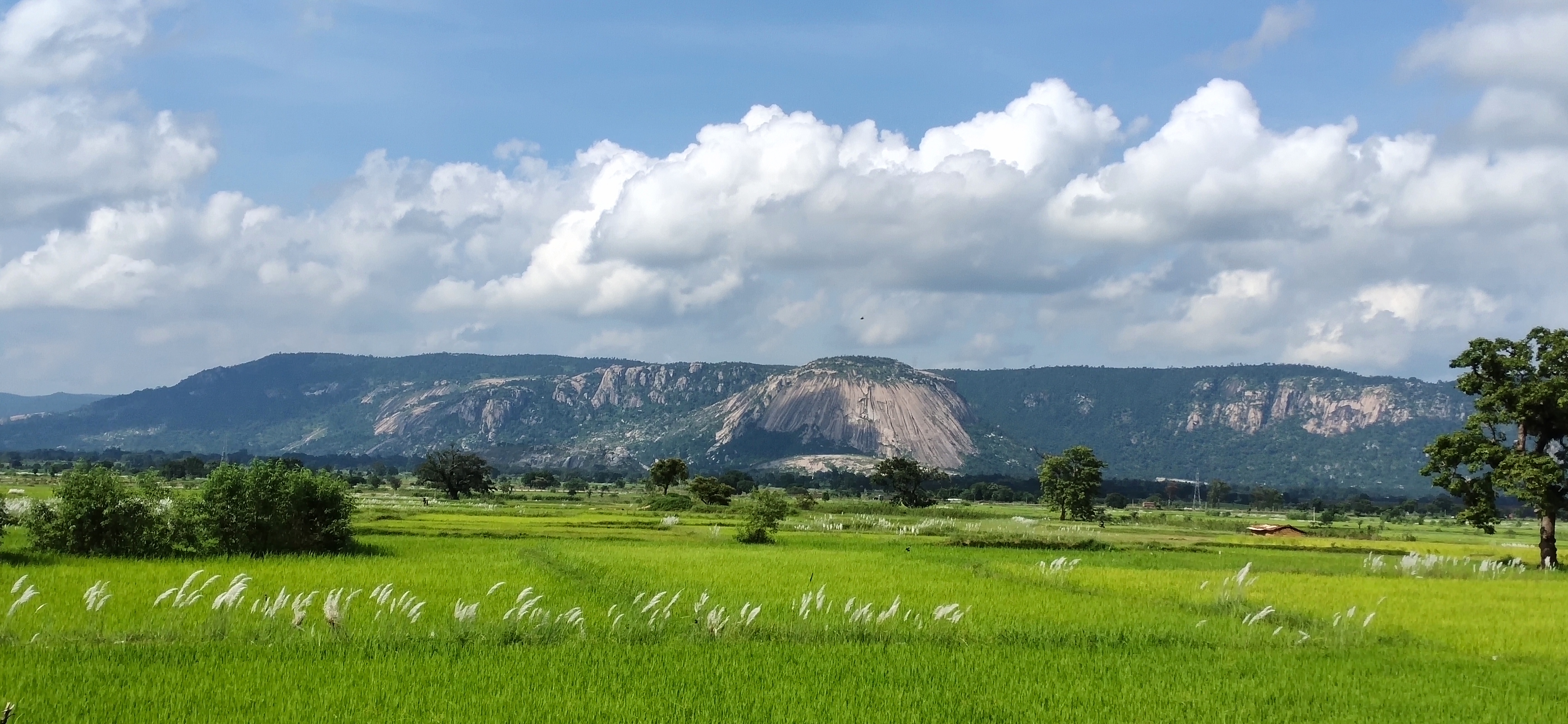
- Madheshwar Mountain along NH 43 in Jashpur district

- Location of Jashpur district in Chhattisgarh
- Coordinates: 22°54′N 84°09′E
- Country: India
- State: Chhattisgarh
- Division: Surguja
- Established: 25 May 1998
- Headquarters: Jashpur Nagar
- Subdivisions: 5 (Jashpur, Kunkuri, Bagicha, Pathalgaon, Farsabahar)

Government
  - Type: District Administration
  - District Collector & Magistrate: Rohit Vyas, IAS
  - Superintendent of Police: Shashi Mohan Singh, IPS
  - Lok Sabha constituency: Raigarh (ST) (MP: Radheshyam Rathiya)
  - Vidhan Sabha constituencies: Jashpur (ST); Kunkuri (ST); Pathalgaon (ST)

Area (6,205 km^{2} per District Administration)
  - District: 5,838 km^{2} (2,254 sq mi)
- Elevation: 753 m (2,470 ft)
- Highest elevation: 1,200 m (3,900 ft)

Population (2011)
  - District: 851,669
  - Density: 146/km^{2} (380/sq mi)
  - Urban: 75,992
  - Rural: 775,677

Demographics
  - Literacy: 67.92%
  - Sex ratio: 1,004 ♀ / 1,000 ♂
  - Official languages: Hindi, Chhattisgarhi
  - Regional languages: Sadri, Kurukh, Odia
- Time zone: UTC+05:30 (IST)
- PIN: 496331 (Jashpur Nagar)
- Telephone code: 07763
- Vehicle registration: CG-14
- Tehsils: 9 (Jashpur, Manora, Duldula, Kunkuri, Farsabahar, Bagicha, Kansabel, Sanna, Pathalgaon)
- Major highways: NH 43
- Website: jashpur.nic.in

Jashpur district is a district in the north-eastern corner of the state of Chhattisgarh in central India, adjoining the states of Jharkhand and Odisha. Jashpur Nagar serves as the administrative headquarters of the district. Formerly the territory of the princely Jashpur State prior to Indian independence, the district was carved out of Raigarh district on 25 May 1998. Characterised by forested plateaus (pats), river valleys, and waterfalls along the western margins of the Chota Nagpur Plateau, Jashpur has a predominantly tribal population, with Scheduled Tribes accounting for over 62% of its residents.

== History ==
=== Early period and Jashpur princely state ===
During the medieval and early modern periods, the forested hill country of Jashpur was governed by a local Dom dynasty. According to regional chronicles, in the mid-18th century, Sujan Rai (also known as Sujan Singh)—a Suryavanshi Chauhan Rajput tracing his lineage to the ruling house of Banswara in Rajputana—led an uprising against the last Dom ruler, Raibhan Dom. After defeating Raibhan Dom in battle, Sujan Rai established the princely state of Jashpur State, founding the royal dynasty that ruled the territory until Indian independence.

In the 18th century, the rulers of Jashpur acknowledged the suzerainty of the Bhonsle Maratha rulers of Nagpur State, paying a customary annual tribute of 21 buffaloes. Prior to 1818, the Bhonsles placed Jashpur under the administrative supervision of neighbouring Surguja State. Following the Third Anglo-Maratha War in 1818, Jashpur became a British protectorate under the Chota Nagpur Tributary States. The state remained under the administrative oversight of the Commissioner of Chota Nagpur until 1905, when it was transferred to the Central Provinces and Berar and subsequently incorporated into the Eastern States Agency.

=== Post-independence and formation of the district ===
Following the independence of India, the last ruler of Jashpur State, Raja Vijay Bhushan Singh Ju Deo, signed the Instrument of Accession to the Dominion of India, and the state was formally merged on 1 January 1948. From 1948 to 1 November 1956, the territory was administered as part of Raigarh district in Central Provinces and Berar (later Madhya Pradesh following the States Reorganisation Act, 1956).

To address the administrative challenges posed by large districts in Madhya Pradesh, Chief Minister Arjun Singh constituted a District Reorganization Commission headed by Justice G. K. Dubey in 1982, which submitted its recommendations in 1989. Although an initial announcement to create 16 new districts—including Jashpur—was made in 1992 under Chief Minister Sunderlal Patwa, implementation was delayed until May 1998. On 22 May 1998, the Government of Madhya Pradesh under Chief Minister Digvijaya Singh notified the creation of the district, and Jashpur district was formally inaugurated on 25 May 1998 by district Minister-in-Charge Chanesh Ram Rathia, with Ramanand Shukla assuming office as its first District Collector. Upon the bifurcation of Madhya Pradesh on 1 November 2000, Jashpur became part of the newly created state of Chhattisgarh.

== Geography ==
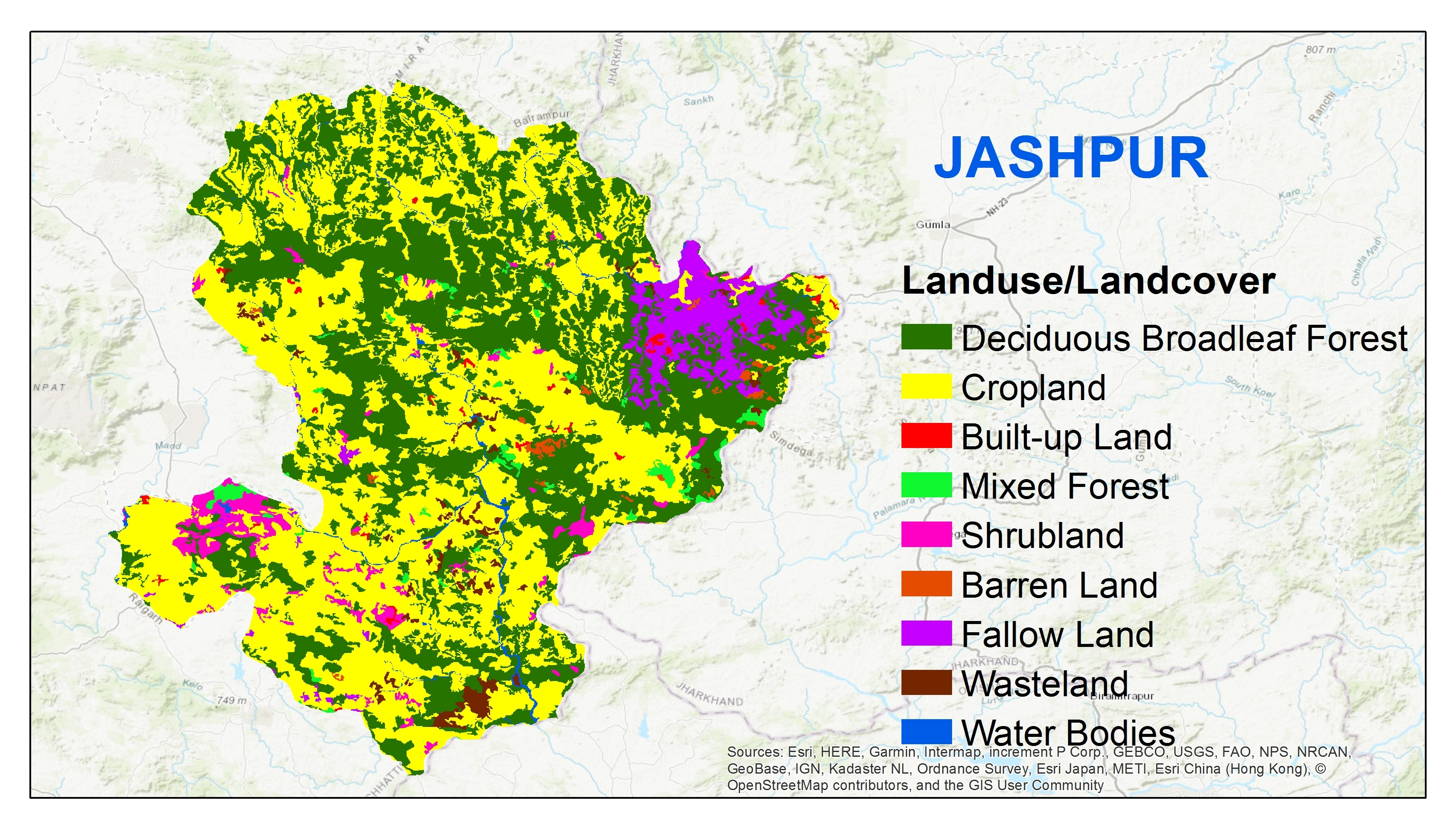
Land-use and land-cover map of Jashpur district

Jashpur district is situated in the north-eastern extremity of Chhattisgarh, The district extends approximately 150 km from north to south and 85 km from east to west, covering a total census area of 5,838 km^{2} (and a total geographical area of 6,205 km^{2} per district revenue records), with 898 km^{2} under notified forest cover. It is bounded by Balrampur-Ramanujganj district to the north, Gumla district and Simdega district of Jharkhand to the east, Sundargarh district of Odisha to the south-east, Raigarh district to the south-west, and Surguja district to the west.

=== Physiography and geomorphology ===
Geomorphologically, Jashpur forms the western extension of the Chota Nagpur Plateau and is divided into two distinct physiographic zones:

- Upper Ghat (Northern Plateau): The northern elevated belt extends from Loroghat, Kastura, Narayanpur, and Bagicha toward the Surguja and Balrampur borders. Covering approximately 1,384 km^{2} at elevations reaching 1,200 metres (3,900 ft) above mean sea level, this zone consists of flat-topped, dense forest plateaus locally called pats (such as Pandrapat and Sanna). The plateau is ascended from the south via the steep, 4 km Loroghat mountain pass.
- Nichghat (Southern Plains and Valleys): Lying south of the Loroghat escarpment across Kunkuri, Kansabel, Pathalgaon, and Farsabahar, Nichghat consists of gently undulating plains interspersed with isolated residual hills, granitic inselbergs (such as Madheshwar Mountain near Kunkuri), and smaller ghat sections including Jhandaghat and Belaghat along the Jashpur–Raigarh corridor.

=== Geology, soils, and hydrology ===
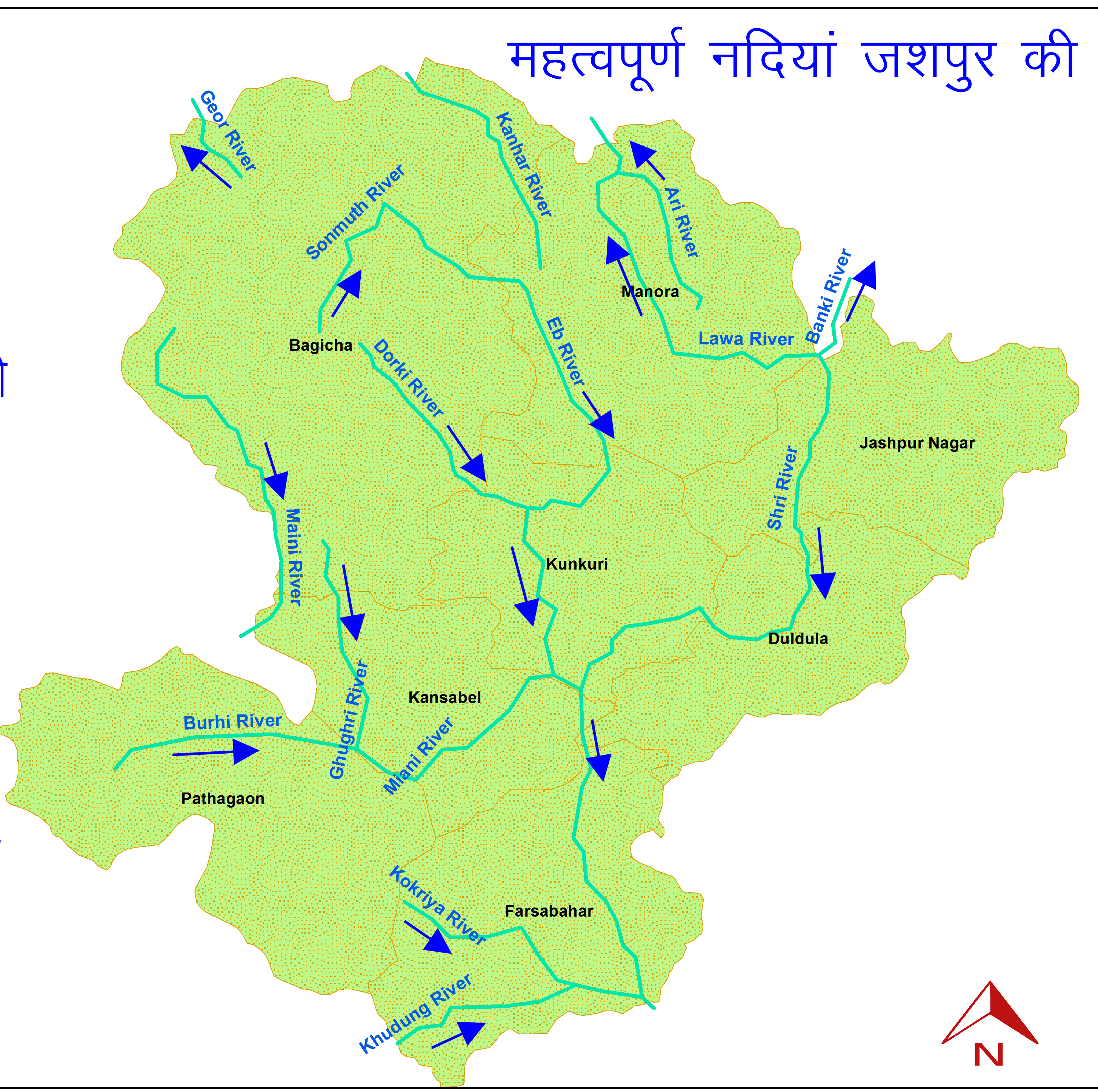
Drainage network and principal rivers of Jashpur district

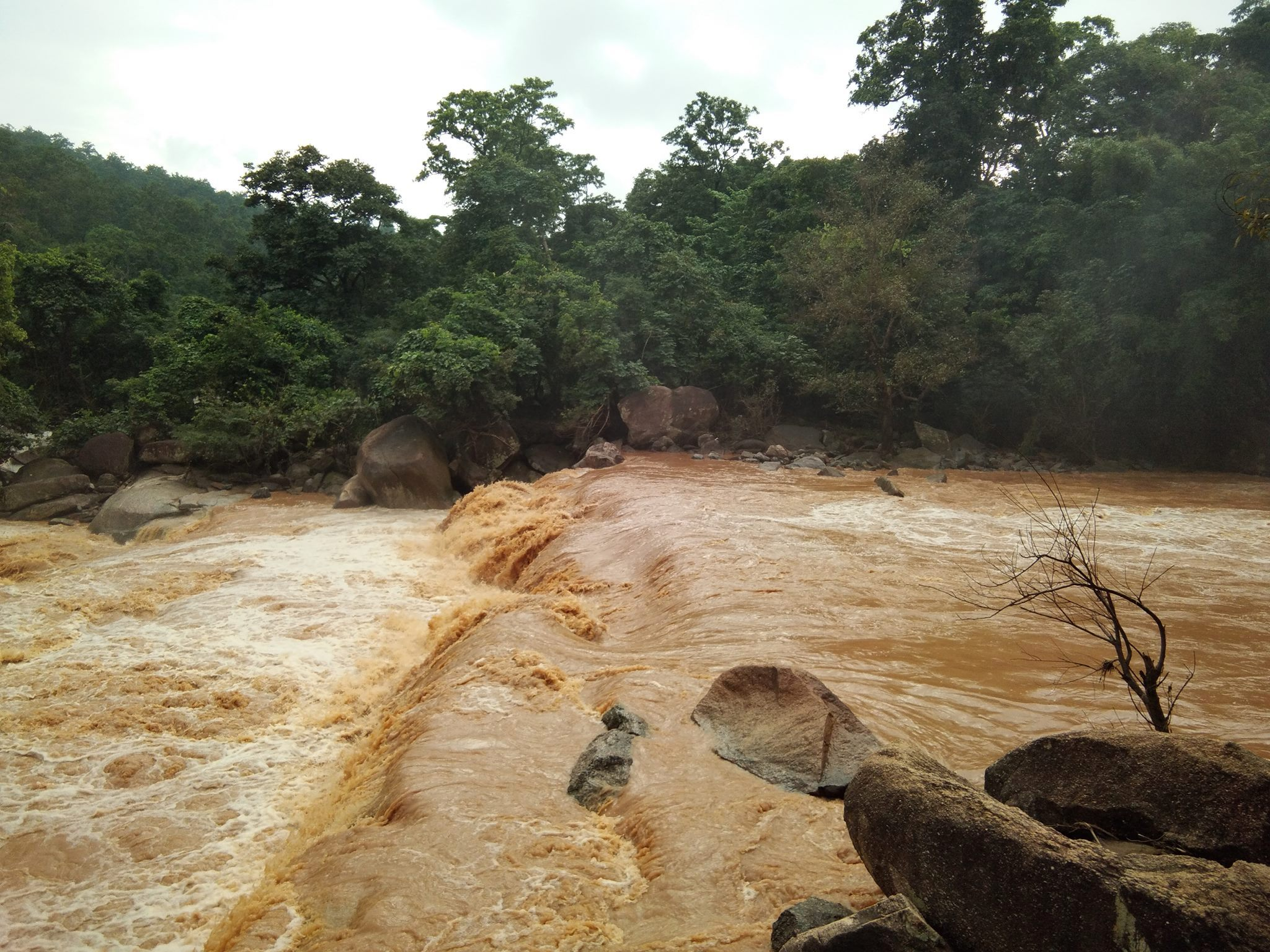
The Ib River at Gullu Waterfall in Jashpur district

Approximately 90% of the district's bedrock comprises Precambrian granitoids—including granite gneiss, chlorite-biotite gneiss, muscovite granite, and granodiorite—while a small area in the north-west consists of Deccan Traps basalt and Lameta sedimentary beds. Nearly the entire upland area is capped by a thick crust of laterite. Soil types correspond closely to the underlying parent rock: yellow soils (Ultisols) and red gravelly soils (Alfisols) weathered from granitoids cover the vast majority of the district, while small pockets of black cotton soil (Inceptisols) occur over the Deccan Traps in the north-west.

The district exhibits an irregular, dendritic drainage pattern divided across three major river basins:

- Mahanadi Basin (71%): Drains the central and southern portions of the district primarily through the Ib River (which originates in Pandrapat near Bagicha) and its tributaries, including the Maini, Dorki, and Siri rivers.
- Brahmani Basin (21%): Drains the eastern belt through the Sankh River and Lava River along the Chhattisgarh–Jharkhand border.
- Lower Ganges Basin (8%): Drains the northern escarpments via the Kanhar River (which rises at Gidha-Dhodhi on the Khudia plateau) and the Geur River.

=== Climate ===
Jashpur experiences a subtropical monsoon climate moderated by its altitude and forest cover. Summer temperatures reach an average maximum of 38 °C (100 °F), with Kunkuri in the lower Nichghat belt recording the highest summer temperatures. Winters are cool, with minimum temperatures averaging 5 °C (41 °F) across the district and dropping near freezing in the high-altitude Pandrapat plateau of the Upper Ghat. The southwest monsoon (June to October) brings an average annual rainfall of 1,400 to 1,487 mm.

== Administration and politics ==
Jashpur district is part of the Surguja division and is divided into 5 revenue subdivisions (Jashpur, Kunkuri, Bagicha, Pathalgaon, and Farsabahar), 9 tehsils (Jashpur, Manora, Duldula, Kunkuri, Farsabahar, Bagicha, Kansabel, Sanna, and Pathalgaon), and 8 Janpad Panchayats (Community Development Blocks: Jashpur, Manora, Duldula, Kunkuri, Farsabahar, Bagicha, Kansabel, and Pathalgaon). Local urban governance comprises 1 Nagar Palika Parishad (Municipal Council at Jashpur Nagar) and 4 Nagar Panchayats (Kunkuri, Bagicha, Pathalgaon, and Kotba), while rural administration encompasses 427 Gram Panchayats and 755 revenue villages.

At the federal level, the entire district falls within the Raigarh Lok Sabha constituency (reserved for Scheduled Tribes), represented in the 18th Lok Sabha by Radheshyam Rathiya of the Bharatiya Janata Party (BJP). In the Chhattisgarh Legislative Assembly, the district comprises three Scheduled Tribe-reserved constituencies:

- Jashpur (ST) – represented by Raymuni Bhagat (BJP)
- Kunkuri (ST) – represented by Vishnu Deo Sai (BJP), Chief Minister of Chhattisgarh
- Pathalgaon (ST) – represented by Gomati Sai (BJP)

== Transport ==
=== Road ===
Road transport is the primary mode of connectivity in Jashpur district, linking it to Raipur, Bilaspur, Raigarh, Ambikapur, and Ranchi. National Highway 43 (formerly NH 78) serves as the principal arterial corridor through the district, passing through Pathalgaon, Ludeg, Kansabel, Bandarchuwan, Kunkuri, Jashpur Nagar, Gholeng, and Lodam before entering Jharkhand. National Highway 143B, a 67.8 km (42.1 mi) secondary route of NH 43, originates near Jashpur Nagar and runs northeast via Manora and Sanna to Dumri and Mahuadanr in Jharkhand. Key state roads include the Kunkuri–Farsabahar–Lawakera State Highway connecting the district to Odisha, and regional corridors linking Jashpur Nagar to Ambikapur via Bagicha and Kusmi. Mountain passes along the highway network include the 4 km Loroghat pass ascending the Upper Ghat plateau, as well as Jhandaghat and Belaghat near Kansabel along the Jashpur–Raigarh corridor.

=== Rail ===
There is no operational railway network within the geographical boundaries of Jashpur district. The nearest major broad-gauge railway stations are Raigarh railway station (located on the Tatanagar–Bilaspur section of the Howrah–Nagpur–Mumbai line) to the south-west and Ranchi Junction railway station to the north-east, both of which provide direct long-distance connectivity to major Indian cities. Ambikapur railway station in neighbouring Surguja district and Bano railway station in Simdega district (Jharkhand) also serve passengers from the western and eastern parts of the district.

=== Air ===
The district is served by Jashpur Airport (also known as the Aagdih Airstrip), a public airstrip located at Aagdih along NH 43, approximately 12 km (7.5 mi) east of Jashpur Nagar (22°55′57.8″N 84°13′51.3″E). Operated by the Government of Chhattisgarh at an elevation of 457 metres (1,499 ft), the facility features a 1,000-metre (3,280 ft) asphalt runway (09/27) used for small non-scheduled aircraft and helicopters.

For scheduled commercial flights, the nearest major airport is Birsa Munda Airport in Ranchi, which offers direct air connectivity to Delhi, Mumbai, Kolkata, Bhubaneswar, and other major cities.

== Demographics ==
Historical population
Year	Pop.	±%
1901	132,114	—
1911	174,458	+32.1%
1921	154,156	−11.6%
1931	193,698	+25.7%
1941	223,632	+15.5%
1951	256,678	+14.8%
1961	306,200	+19.3%
1971	396,591	+29.5%
1981	569,049	+43.5%
1991	656,352	+15.3%
2001	743,160	+13.2%
2011	851,669	+14.6%
Source: Census of India

According to the 2011 Census of India, Jashpur district had a population of 851,669 (424,747 males and 426,922 females), ranking 473rd among the 640 districts of India at the time. The district recorded a population density of 146 inhabitants per square kilometre (378/sq mi) and a decadal population growth rate of 14.60% between 2001 and 2011. Jashpur is predominantly rural, with 775,677 residents (91.08%) living in rural areas and 75,992 (8.92%) residing in urban centres.

The district had a sex ratio of 1,004 females per 1,000 males, and a child population (aged 0–6 years) of 122,266. The effective literacy rate in 2011 stood at 67.92% (male literacy at 77.35% and female literacy at 58.55%). Scheduled Castes accounted for 48,844 (5.73%) and Scheduled Tribes accounted for 530,378 (62.28%) of the total population. Major indigenous communities in the district include the Oraon (Kurukh), Kanwar, Pahari Korwa (a PVTG), Birhor (PVTG), Nagesia, Gond, Kharia, and Munda tribes.

=== Religion ===
Religions in Jashpur district (2011 Census)
1. Hinduism (73.9%)
2. Christianity (22.3%)
3. Islam (1.80%)
4. Other (Tribal religions) (1.74%)
5. Other (0.29%)

Celebration of the traditional Karam festival in Jashpur district

At the 2011 Census of India, Hinduism was practised by 73.91% (629,465) of the district's population. Christianity formed the second-largest religious community at 22.26% (189,577), making Jashpur the district with the highest proportion of Christians in Chhattisgarh; Kunkuri is the seat of the Roman Catholic Diocese of Jashpur and home to the Cathedral of Our Lady of the Rosary, inaugurated in 1962. Islam accounted for 1.80% (15,349), indigenous tribal religions such as Sarnaism accounted for 1.74% (14,827), while Jainism (0.08%), Sikhism (0.06%), Buddhism (0.05%), and unstated affiliations (0.10%) comprised the remaining 0.29%.

=== Languages ===
Languages of Jashpur district (2011 Census)
1. Sadri (48.8%)
2. Kurukh (27.6%)
3. Chhattisgarhi (9.60%)
4. Odia (5.09%)
5. Hindi (4.98%)
6. Bhojpuri (1.36%)
7. Other (2.57%)

According to the 2011 Census of India, 48.83% of the population in Jashpur district recorded Sadri (Nagpuri) as their mother tongue, serving as the primary lingua franca across both tribal and non-tribal communities. Kurukh (Oraon), a North Dravidian language spoken by the Oraon community, was the second most widely spoken mother tongue at 27.57%. Other prominent first languages included Chhattisgarhi (9.60%), Odia (5.09%, concentrated in the southern border belt near Odisha), standard Hindi (4.98%), and Bhojpuri (1.36%), with minor tribal and regional languages accounting for the remaining 2.57%.
