= List of urban local bodies in Chhattisgarh =

Chhattisgarh has 14 Municipal Corporations, 54 Municipal Councils and 124 Municipal Boards or Nagar Pachayats. Thus Chhattisgarh has a total 192 Municipalities or Urban Local Bodies(ULBs).

== List of municipal corporations ==
S. No.	Municipal corporation	District	Mayor	Ruling party
1	Ambikapur Municipal Corporation	Sarguja	Manjusha Bhagat	Bharatiya Janata Party
2	Bhilai Charoda Municipal Corporation	Durg	Vacant	Bharatiya Janata Party
3	Bhilai Municipal Corporation	Durg	Vacant	Bharatiya Janata Party
4	Durg Municipal Corporation	Durg	Alka Baghmar	Bharatiya Janata Party
5	Bilaspur Municipal Corporation	Bilaspur	Pooja Vidhani	Bharatiya Janata Party
6	Birgaon Municipal Corporation	Raipur	Vacant	Bharatiya Janata Party
7	Raipur Municipal Corporation	Raipur	Meenal Choubey	Bharatiya Janata Party
8	Chirmiri Municipal Corporation	Koriya	Ram Naresh Rai	Bharatiya Janata Party
9	Dhamtari Municipal Corporation	Dhamtari	Jagdish Ramu Mehra	Bharatiya Janata Party
10	Jagdalpur Municipal Corporation	Bastar	Sanjay Pandey	Bharatiya Janata Party
11	Rajnandgaon Municipal Corporation	Rajnandgaon	Madhusudan Yadav	Bharatiya Janata Party
12	Risali Municipal Corporation	Durg	Vacant	Bharatiya Janata Party
13	Korba Municipal Corporation	Korba	Sanju Rajput	Bharatiya Janata Party
14	Raigarh Municipal Corporation	Raigarh	Jeevardhan Chauhan	Bharatiya Janata Party

== List of municipal councils ==
S. No.	Nagar palika	District
1	Balod	Balod
2	Dalli Rajhara	Balod
3	Baloda Bazar	Baloda Bazar
4	Bhatapara	Baloda Bazar
5	Simga	Baloda Bazar
6	Ramanujganj	Balrampur
7	Jagdalpur	Bastar
8	Bemetara	Bemetara
9	Bijapur	Bijapur
10	Bilha	Bilaspur
11	Bodri	Bilaspur
12	Ratanpur	Bilaspur
13	Takhatpur	Bilaspur
14	Tifra	Bilaspur
15	Kirandul	Dantewada
16	Kurud	Dhamtari
17	Ahiwara	Durg
18	Kumhari	Durg
19	Gariaband	Gariaband
20	Rajim	Gariaband
21	Gaurella	Gaurela Pendra Marwahi
22	Pendra	Gaurela Pendra Marwahi
23	Akaltara	Janjgir Champa
26	Champa	Janjgir Champa
27	Janjgir	Janjgir Champa
28	Jashpur	Jashpur
29	Kawardha	Kawardha
30	Pandariya	Kawardha
31	Kanker	Kanker
32	Kondagaon	Kondagaon
33	Katghora	Korba
34	Dipka	Korba
35	Baikunthpur	Koriya
36	Bagbahara	Mahasamund
37	Mahasamund	Mahasamund
38	Saraipali	Mahasamund
39	Manendragarh	Manendragarh-Chirmiri-Bharatpur
40	Ambagarh Chowki	Mohla-Manpur-Ambagarh Chowki
41	Lormi	Mungeli
42	Mungeli	Mungeli
43	Narayanpur	Narayanpur
44	Kharsia	Raigarh
45	Abhanpur	Raipur
46	Dongargarh	Rajnandgaon
47	Sarangarh	Sarangarh-Bilaigarh
48	Sakti	Sakti
49	Sukma	Sukma
50	Surajpur	Surajpur
51	Arang	Raipur
52	Jamul	Durg
53	Tilda Newra	Raipur
54	Khairagarh	Khairagarh-Chhuikhadan-Gandai

== List of municipal boards ==
S. No.	Nagar panchayat	District
1	Abhanpur	Raipur
2	Arang	Raipur
3	Kharora	Raipur
4	Mana-Camp	Raipur
5	Kurud	Dhamtari
6	Magarlod	Dhamtari
7	Ambagarh Chowki	Mohla-Manpur-AC
8	Antagarh	Kanker
9	Bhanupratappur	Kanker
10	Narharpur	Kanker
11	Charama	Kanker
12	Adbhar	Sakti
13	Dabhra	Sakti
14	Jaijaipur	Sakti
15	Akaltara	Janjgir–Champa
16	Baloda	Janjgir–Champa
17	Shivrinarayan	Janjgir–Champa
18	Bamhanidih	Janjgir–Champa
19	Nawagarh	Janjgir–Champa
20	Rahod	Janjgir–Champa
21	Bilaigarh	Sarangarh–Bilaigarh
22	Sariya	Sarangarh–Bilaigarh
23	Berla	Bemetara
24	Maro	Bemetara
25	Nawagarh	Bemetara
26	Saja	Bemetara
27	Thankhamaria	Bemetara
28	Bagbahara	Mahasamund
29	Basna	Mahasamund
30	Pithora	Mahasamund
31	Bodri	Bilaspur
32	Bilha	Bilaspur
33	Kota	Bilaspur
34	Malhar	Bilaspur
35	Gaurela	GPM
36	Pendra	GPM
37	Lormi	Mungeli
38	Pathariya	Mungeli
39	Chhuikhadan	KCG
40	Gandai	KCG
41	Dongargaon	Rajnandgaon
42	Chhuria	Rajnandgaon
43	Ghumka	Rajnandgaon
44	Kawardha	Kabirdham
45	Pandariya	Kabirdham
46	Bodla	Kabirdham
47	Sahaspur Lohara	Kabirdham
48	Pandatarai	Kabirdham
49	Patan	Durg
50	Dhamdha	Durg
51	Anda	Durg
52	Gundardehi	Balod
53	Gurur	Balod
54	Chikhlakasa	Balod
55	Dondi	Balod
56	Arjunda	Balod
57	Bhatgaon	Baloda Bazar
58	Palari	Baloda Bazar
59	Kasdol	Baloda Bazar
60	Lawan	Baloda Bazar
61	Tundra	Baloda Bazar
62	Fingeshwar	Gariaband
63	Chhura	Gariaband
64	Rajim	Gariaband
65	Katghora	Korba
66	Pali	Korba
67	Chhuri-Kala	Korba
68	Dharamjaigarh	Raigarh
69	Gharghoda	Raigarh
70	Kharsia	Raigarh
71	Lailunga	Raigarh
72	Pussore	Raigarh
73	Saradih	Raigarh
74	Kirodimal Nagar	Raigarh
75	Bastar	Bastar
76	Lohandiguda	Bastar
77	Bakawand	Bastar
78	Geedam	Dantewada
79	Barsur	Dantewada
80	Bhairamgarh	Bijapur
81	Bhopalpatnam	Bijapur
82	Dornapal	Sukma
83	Konta	Sukma
84	Kondagaon	Kondagaon
85	Farasgaon	Kondagaon
86	Keskal	Kondagaon
87	Narayanpur	Narayanpur
88	Bagicha	Jashpur
89	Kunkuri	Jashpur
90	Pathalgaon	Jashpur
91	Kotba	Jashpur
92	Lodam	Jashpur
93	Lakhanpur	Surguja
94	Sitapur	Surguja
95	Udaipur	Surguja
96	Bishrampur	Surajpur
97	Pratappur	Surajpur
98	Ramanujnagar	Surajpur
99	Premnagar	Surajpur
100	Bhatgaon	Surajpur
101	Jarhi	Surajpur
102	Kusmi	Balrampur
103	Rajpur	Balrampur
104	Ramanujganj	Balrampur
105	Wadrafnagar	
106	Jhaggrakhand	MCB
107	Khongapani	MCB
108	Ledri	MCB
109	Newri	MCB
110	Nai-Ledri	MCB
111	Baikunthpur	Koriya
112	Chirmiri	MCB
113	Kelhari	MCB
114	Shivanandanpur	Surajpur
115	Chandrapur	Sakti
116	Adbhar	Sakti
117	Khamhria	Bemetara
118	Pipariya	Kabirdham
119	Kumhari	Durg
120	Aundhi	Mohla-Manpur-AC
121	Bhairamgarh	Bijapur
122	Basna	Mahasamund
123	Saraipali	Mahasamund
124	Pithora	Mahasamund

== District-wise summary ==
No.	District	Urban local bodies			Total
No.	District	Municipal corporations	Municipal councils	Nagar panchayats	Total
1	Balod	0	1	4	8
2	Baloda Bazar	0	1	2	3
3	Balrampur	0	4	7	11
4	Bastar	1	3	1	4
5	Bemetara	0	4	1	11
6	Bijapur	0	3	9	15
7	Bilaspur	1	5	1	8
8	Dantewada	0	2	3	8
9	Dhamtari	1	4	1	6
10	Durg	4	1	5	6
11	Gariaband	0	5	6	11
12	Gaurela-Pendra-Marwahi	0	8	8	18
13	Janjgir-Champa	0	4	2	6
14	Jashpur	0	1	4	8
15	Kawardha	0	1	2	3
16	Kanker	0	4	7	11
17	Kondagaon	0	3	1	4
18	Khairagarh-Chhuikhadan-Gandai	0	4	1	11
19	Korba	1	3	9	15
20	Koriya	0	5	1	8
21	Mahasamund	0	2	3	8
22	Manendragarh-Chirmiri-Bharatpur	1	4	1	6
23	Mohla-Manpur- Ambagarh Chowki	0	1	5	6
24	Mungeli	0	5	6	11
25	Narayanpur	0	8	8	18
26	Raigarh	1	4	2	6
27	Raipur	2	1	5	6
28	Surguja	1	5	6	11
29	Rajnandgaon	1	8	8	18
30	Sarangarh-Bilaigarh	0	4	2	6
31	Sakti	0	1	5	6
32	Sukma	0	5	6	11
33	Surajpur	0	8	8	18
Total		14	54	124	192

== See also ==
- Government of Chhattisgarh
- Politics of Chhattisgarh
