= Jamul =

Jamul may refer to the following places:

- Jamul, California, U.S.
- Jamul, Durg, Chhattisgarh, India
- Jamul Mountains, in San Diego County, California, U.S.
- Rancho Jamul, Mexican land grant in present-day San Diego County, California, U.S.
