= Shekhar Sen =

Indian musician, singer and theatre actor

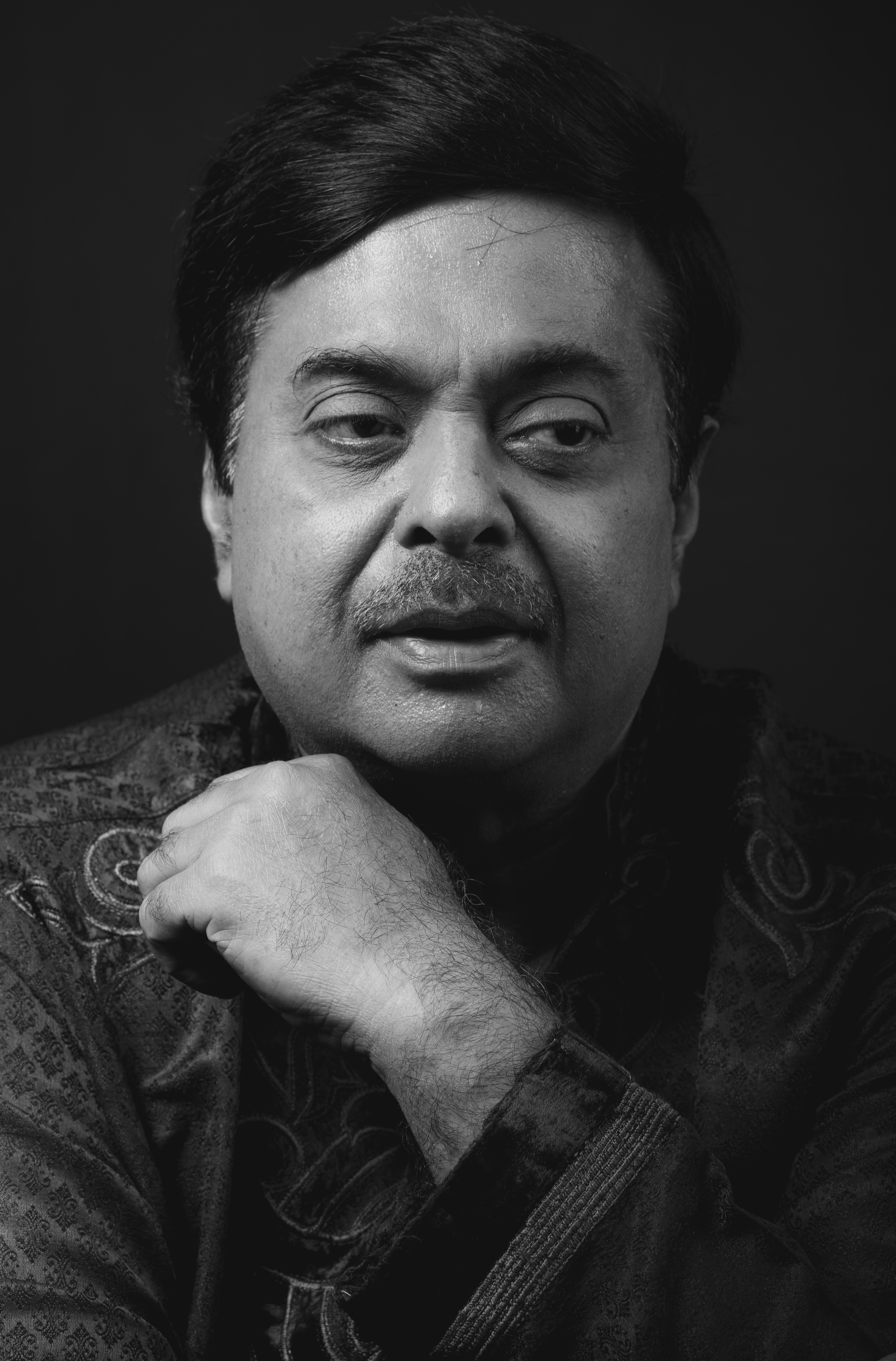
- Born: 16 February 1961 (age 65); Raipur, Madhya Pradesh now Chhattisgarh, India
- Education: Indira Kala Sangeet Vishwavidyalaya
- Occupation: Chairman of Sangeet Natak Akademi (2015–present)
- Years active: 1979–present
- Spouse: Shweta Sen
- Children: Kritarth Sen
- Parents: Dr. ArunKumar Sen (father); Dr. Aneeta Sen (mother)
- Awards: Padma Shri(2015)
- Website: www.shekharsen.com

Shekhar Sen is a singer, a music composer, a lyricist, and an actor.

Sen is famous for his monoact musical plays that he researched, written, composed, enacted, and directed: "Tulsi", "Kabeer", "Vivekanand", "Saahab" & "Soordas".

== Early life ==
Sen was born in 1961 and raised in a Bengali family in Raipur, Chhattisgarh. His father, the late Dr. Arun Kumar Sen, who was the Vice-Chancellor at Indira Kala Sangeet Vishwavidyalaya, Khairagarh, and mother late Dr. Aneeta Sen, were both renowned classical singers of Gwalior Gharana and Musicologists. He learned music from his parents, moved to Mumbai in 1979 to become music composer, and began singing in 1984. He started doing research oriented musical programs, such as Dushywant Ne Kaha Tha 1984 (ghazals of Dushyant Kumar), Madhya Yugeen Kaavya 1985 (sang medieval poets like Raskhan, Raheem, Lalitkishori, Bhooshan, Bihari, Kabir, Tulsidas, Sur Pakistan ka Hindi Kavya1986 (Hindi Geet, Dohe written in Pakistan), Meera Se Mahadevi Tak 1987 (Hindi songs by Poetesses) & many more innovative programmes.

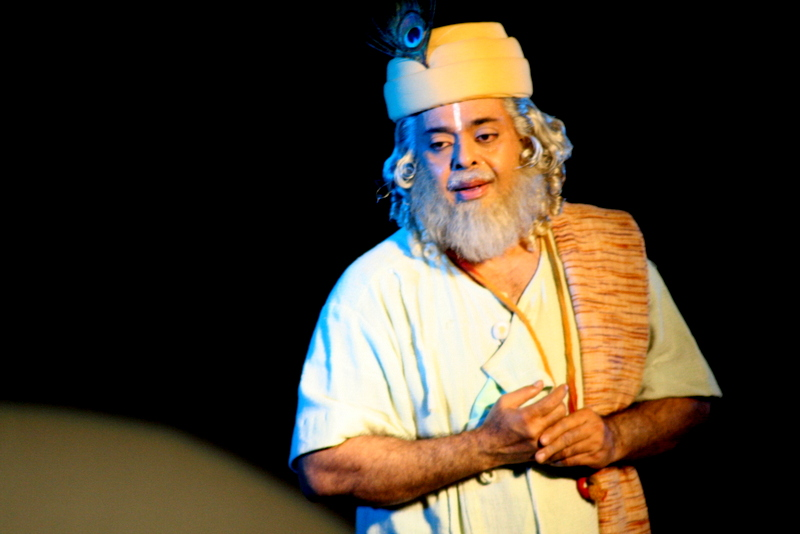
Shekhar Sen performing as Kabir

== Career ==
Sen started his career in Mumbai in 1979, with the objective of becoming a music composer. He was contracted by His Master's Voice as a ghazal singer. He soon realized that his true talent lay in composing bhajans so he shifted to that, rendering more than 200 Bhajan Albums since 1983 as singer, a lyricist, and a composer. He sang and composed for many TV serials and films. He has performed more than 1200 concerts, singing all over the world.

Since 1998, as a playwright, actor, singer, director and composer, Sen has created one man musical plays and performed more than 1000 shows of his Mono Act Musical Plays, "Tulsi", "Kabeer" "Vivekananda" "Sanmati", "Saahab" & "Soordas". His performances received great acclaim in India as well as abroad such as US, England, Belgium, Suriname, Singapore, Jakarta, Hong Kong, Johannesburg, Sharjah, Mauritius, and Trinidad.

Sen's play, a mono-act "Soordas", premiered at NCPA Mumbai on 14 June 2013. Sen told Timeout Mumbai, "Initially, I was very apprehensive about whether to portray a blind person for two hours – a very tough task. But when I started writing [the play] I realised that people with sight can only see the world [in a 180-degree view], while those without sight are able to see the world [in] 360 degrees". In 2015, he received the Padma Shri Award, and was appointed to be the Chairperson for Sangit Natya Academy by Indian Government.

== Awards and accolades ==
- Chair Person of Sangeet Natak Academy since 2015
- Padma Shri Award in Art field by Indian Government, 2015
- Sangeet Natak Academy Uttar Pradesh felicitated him with "Safdar Hashmi Puraskaar, 2001" for the contribution in the field of theatre
- Performed "Kabeer" at Lok Sabha on 4 May 2005
- V.Shantaram Samman of Maharashtra Rajya Hindi Sahitya Academy, 2008
- Performed "Vivekanand" at Rashtrapati Bhavan on 27 April 2013
- Performed "[Mono Act on life of Soordas]" at Rashtrapati Bhavan on 11 April 2015
- Performed in World Hindi Conference at Paramaribo, Suriname on 6–9 June 2003
- Served as expert committee member of Ministry of Human Resource Development (India) for 2 years
- Performed in World Hindi Conference at Johannesburg, South Africa on 22–24 September 2012
- As member of Central Board of Film Certification for 4 years

== Discs and albums ==
Album	Language	Role		Other notes
Album	Language	Singer	Composer	Other notes
Samnarpan	Hindi	No	Yes	Shekhar Sen,
Amrit Wani	Hindi	No	Yes	Shekhar Sen,
Durga Sapt Shati (edited)	Hindi	No	Yes	Anuradha Paudwal,
Sangeet Sandhya	Hindi	No	Yes	Shekhar Sen,
Aaj Tera Jagraata Maa	Hindi	No	Yes	Sonu Nigam, Alka Yagnik
Bhajanodaya	Hindi	No	Yes	Udit Narayan
Bhajan Vatika	Hindi	No	Yes	Udit Narayan
Chalisa Sangrah	Hindi	No	Yes	Anuradha Paudwal
Gayatri Maha Mantram	Kannada/Tamil/Telugu	No	Yes	Hariharan
Hey Mahavir (Dhun)	Hindi	No	Yes	Shalini Shrivastava
Jay Sai Ram Jay Sai Shyam	Hindi	No	Yes	Ravinder Bijur
Maago Anandomoyee	Bangla	No	Yes	Anuradha Paudwal
Aami Ek Probashi	Bangla	Yes	Yes	
Maha Mrityunjaya Mantram	Telugu	No	Yes	Hariharan
Mahima Mahakal Ki	Hindi	No	Yes	Anuradha Paudwal
Mahima Mata Chhinnmasta Ki	Hindi	No	Yes	Priya Bhattacharya & Soham
Naman	Hindi	No	Yes	Nitin Mukesh
Nehanjali	Hindi	No	Yes	Nitin Mukesh
Paawan Haridwar Mahakumbh	Hindi	No	Yes	Anuradha Paudwal, Babla Mehta
Ram Shyam Gungaan	Hindi	No	Yes	Ronu Majumdar
Samarpan	Hindi	Yes	Yes	
Shakti-Maa Kaali Bhajans	Hindi	No	Yes	Anuradha Paudwal
Shirdi Wale Saibaba Ki Kahani(2 Volumes)	Hindi	No	Yes	Nitin Mukesh, Anuradha Paudwal
Shiv Aaradhana	Hindi	No	Yes	Anuradha Paudwal
Shivganga	Hindi	No	Yes	Anuradha Paudwal
Shree Durga Stuti Vol. 1 To 4	Hindi	No	Yes	Anuradha Paudwal
Shree Ram Charit Mala	Hindi	No	Yes	Anuradha Paudwal
Shreemad Bhagavad Geeta (Vol. 1 To 4)	Sanskrit	No	Yes	Anuradha Paudwal
Shri Ganapati Sahastranamavali	Hindi	No	Yes	Anuradha Paudwal
Shubh Deepavali	Hindi	No	Yes	Anuradha Paudwal, Hari Om Sharan, Sukhwinder Singh, Kavita Paudwal
Tulsi Ramayan Vol. 1 To 8	Hindi	No	Yes	Anuradha Paudwal, Babla Mehta
