= Salhewara =

Village in Chhattisgarh, India

Salhewara is the main village in Khairagarh-Chhuikhadan-Gandai district of the Indian state of Chhattisgarh. The population is about 5,000.

== Geography ==
The village is situated in the middle of a forest and is very near to the border of Madhya Pradesh. It has good transportation facilities to the major cities of Chhattisgarh - also it provides small villages to visit for a trip Raipur (state capital, Durg and Rajnandgaon.

== Facilities ==
It has the basic amenities such as a higher secondary school and 24-hour electricity. The panchayat has the status of a block. It has three banks.
