= Nav Sadhana Kala Kendra =

Nav sadhana Kala Kendra College of Dance and Music is situated in a pollution free green suburb, near Tarna, Shivpur, of the city - Kashi in india. The college was founded in July 1996 by the catholic Bishops of Uttar Pradesh, Uttarakhand and Rajasthan, to promote Indian culture and music. Nav Sadhana Kala Kendra trains students in Bharatnatyam and Hindustani Vocal.

Kala Kendra facilities include green trees, guarded dance cottages, auditorium, open stage, library, and a computer lab. Nav Sadhana Kala Kendra is affiliated to Indira Kala Sangeet Vishwavidyalaya, Khairagarh (Chhattisgarh)

It offers B.A and M.A courses in Bharatnatyam and Hindustani Vocal

== Objectives ==
- To educate youth to appreciate Indian classical dance and music and its role in raising the quality of life.
- To educate and empower young girls in a special way for a job-oriented career.
- To train the younger generation in self-discipline and to communicate social and spiritual values through the divine art of dance and music
