= Sanjari, Durg =

Sanjari
- village
- Country: India
- State: Chhattisgarh
- District: Durg
- Tehsil: Dondiluhara

Government
  - Body: Village panchayat

Population (2001)
  - Total: 2,511
- Time zone: UTC+5:30 (IST)
- Vehicle registration: CG

Sanjari is a village in Dondiluhara tehsil, Durg district, Chhattisgarh, India.

== Demographics ==
In the 2001 India census, the village of Sanjari in Durg district had a population of 2,511, with 1,216 males (48.4%) and 1,295 females (51.6%), for a gender ratio of 1065 females per thousand males.
