= Chhuikhadan =

- City
- City Of Martyrs
- Nickname: Ckn
- Interactive map of Chhuikhadan
- Location in Chhattisgarh, India Chhuikhadan (India)
- Coordinates: 21.53°N 80.98°E
- Country: India
- State: Chhattisgarh
- District: Khairagarh-Chhuikhadan-Gandai
- Founder: Mahant Roop Das
- Named for: Mines of white clay

Government
  - Type: Municipality/Municipal Council
  - Body: Nagar Panchayat
  - Municipal Chairman: Namrata Giriraj Vaishnav (INC)
  - District Collector: Shri. Indrajeet Singh Chandrawal (IAS)
  - Superintendent of Police: Shri lakshya Sharma (IPS)
  - MLA: Yashoda Verma (INC)
  - Chief Municipal Officer: Kuldip jha

Area
  - Total: 20 km^{2} (7.7 sq mi)
- Elevation: 337 m (1,106 ft)

Population (2011)
  - Total: 176,222+

Languages
  - Official: Hindi, Chhattisgarhi
- Time zone: UTC+5:30 (IST)
- PIN: 491885 (Chhuikhadan)
- Area code: 07743
- Vehicle registration: CG-34
- Sex ratio: 993 ♂/♀

Chhuikhadan is a city and a municipality in Khairagarh-Chhuikhadan-Gandai district in the Indian state of Chhattisgarh, India. It is the administrative sub-headquarters of Khairagarh-Chhuikhadan-Gandai district. Chhuikhadan is also known as "City of Martyrs and City of Pan".

== Geography ==
Chhuikhadan is located at 21.53°N 80.98°E. It has an average elevation of 337 metres (1106 feet).

Chhuikhadan is situated on the banks of the rain-fed Near, Lamti River, and Piparia River which originates from the Maikal Hills, the eastern extension of the Satpuras Range of Central India. It's a dolomite rich region surrounded by dense forests in the north-west.

The district lies on central-west of Chhattisgarh state. It is surrounded by district Kabirdham on the north, districts Durg and Bemetara on the east, district Rajnandgaon on the south and district Balaghat of Madhya Pradesh on the west.

Major cities around Chhuikhadan are:

Raipur in East
Nagpur in West
Bhopal in North-west
Jabalpur in West
Durg-Bhilai in East
Bilaspur and Kawardha in North
Rajnandgaon and Dongargarh in South-West

== Climate ==
The climate in Chhuikhadan, and this part of India, has a hot summer between mid-April to mid-June. Besides these two months, the climate is generally pleasant. Chhuikhadan receives an average rainfall of around 784 millimeters per year. In winters, the minimum temperature falls to 7-9 °C. One may enjoy monsoon, autumn, winter, and spring at one place.

Chhuikhadan

Climate chart (precipitation, max. and min. temperature)
J	F	M	A	M	J	J	A	S	O	N	D
6 28 15	7 32 18	3 36 23	4 40 27	6 42 30	89 37 28	214 30 25	263 30 24	147 31 24	43 31 22	5 29 19	8 27 16
- █ Average max. and min. temperatures in °C
- █ Precipitation totals in mm
- Source: IMD
Imperial conversion
J	F	M	A	M	J	J	A	S	O	N	D
0.2 82 59	0.3 90 64	0.1 97 73	0.2 104 81	0.2 108 86	3.5 99 82	8.4 86 77	10 86 75	5.8 88 75	1.7 88 72	0.2 84 66	0.3 81 61
- █ Average max. and min. temperatures in °F
- █ Precipitation totals in inches

== Demography ==
Religions in Chhuikhadan (2011)
Religion	Percent
Hinduism	89.03%
Muslim	6.33%
Jainism	2.99%
Buddhist	1.41%
Christian	0.11%
Sikhism	0.11%
Other or not stated	0.01%
Distribution of religions

As of the 2011 India, Chhuikhadan had a population of 176222. Males constitute 50% of the population and females 50%. Chhuikhadan has an average literacy rate of 83.72%, higher than the national average of 70.28.%; with male literacy of 91.07% and female literacy of 76.34%. 12% of the population is under 6 years of age.

== History ==
Chhuikhadan State was a native princely state of India during the British Raj. It is also called Kondka. After the independence of India, it was included in Madhya Pradesh, after which it is presently in Chhuikhadan city in Khairagarh-Chhuikhadan-Gandai district of Chhattisgarh it was the capital of the state. Chhuikhadan State was established in the year 1750 by Mahant Roop Das Bairagi. and the see of the Mahant's residence. which later formed part of Chhattisgarh States Agency. Chhuikhadan State was ruled by (Bairagis) . This state was of 174 square miles, out of which 27,907 acres were cultivated and 48,538 acres were cultivable. In 1870 there were 120 villages in this state with a total population of 13,281. In 1922 Chhuikhadan town became a municipality before independence. The population of this state in 1941 was 32,731. The Chiefs of Chhuikhadan were originally under the Bhonsles of Nagpur, the first Chief being Mahant Rup Das in 1750. However, after the defeat of Marathas, they were recognized by the British to as Mahant Laxman Das is feudatory chiefs in is 1865 conferring the title and sanad Shrimant Mahant Rituparna Kishore Das the last ruling chief of Chhuikhadan acceded to the Union of India on 1 February 1948.

At India's independence on 1 January 1948, the state was merged into India. The former royal palace is still in very good condition.

== Points of interest ==
- Chhindari Dam
- Baital Rani Ghati
- Dhas Kuwa waterfall
- Mandipkhol Cave
- Maa Kali temple
- Maa Vaishnodevi Temple
- Prachin Mahamaya Temple Kondka
- Narmada Temple Chaknar

== Transport ==
=== By Road ===
SH 5 connects Chhuikhadan with other parts of the state. Bus services operate between the Chhattisgrah like (Kawardha, Raipur, Rajnandgaon, Durg-Bhilai, Bemetara). different cities of Madhya Pradesh (like Jabalpur, Balaghat, Mandla, Baihar, Malajkhand). Maharashtra like (Nagpur, Bhandara, Chandrapur) Telangana like (Hyderabad, Sikandrabad, Nizamabad, Adilabad).

=== By Railway ===
The three nearby railway stations, Rajnandgaon, Dongargarh, and Durg, are 52, 54 and 67 kilometres away from Chhuikhadan respectively. Direct trains for Vishakhapatnam, Mumbai, Pune, Ahmedabad, Howrah, Bhubaneswar, Chennai, Trivandrum, Amritsar and New Delhi are available from these railway stations, situated on the main train route of Howrah-Mumbai via Nagpur. The state capital Raipur is a three-hour journey from Chhuikhadan City. Raipur and Nagpur airports are at a distance of 112 and 237 kilometres, respectively.

== See also ==
- Chhuikhadan State
- Khairagarh-Chhuikhadan-Gandai district
