= Anda, Chhattisgarh =

Anda
- Location in Chhattisgarh, India Anda (India)
- Coordinates: 21.0688474°N 81.2781429°E
- Country: India
- State: Chhattisgarh
- District: Durg

Government
  - Type: Gram Panchayat
- Elevation: 299 m (981 ft)

Population (2011)
  - Total: 4,169

Languages
  - Official: Chhattisgarhi, Hindi
- Time zone: UTC+5:30 (IST)
- PIN: 491221
- Telephone code: 0788
- Vehicle registration: CG-07
- Village of Chhattisgarh

Anda is a village located in Durg Tehsil of Durg district in the Indian state of Chhattisgarh. The village population is estimated to be at 4,169.

As the constitution of India and Panchyati Raaj Act, Anda village is administrated by a Sarpanch (Head of Village) who is elected representative of the village.

Village Anda It is believed that the name of this village was not Anda since the time of Lord Krishna. This village is located in Durg district of Chhattisgarh state. This is the distance of the village, about 13 km from Durg bus stand. It is a matter of Dwapar era, at that time the number of snakes was more.

== Geography ==
Anda is located at 21.06°N 81.27°E 15 km south of Durg (the district's headquarters) and 48 km from Raipur the state capital.

The postal head office has pincode 491221.

Kuthrel (3 km), Janjgiri (3 km), Otebandh (3 km), Danganiya (4 km), Risama (5 km) are the nearby Villages to Anda.

Anda is surrounded by Durg Tehsil towards north, Bhilai Tehsil towards north, Rajnandgaon Tehsil towards west, Pata Tehsil towards east. Bhilai, Durg-Bhilai Nagar, Rajnandgaon, Balod are the nearby cities to Anda.

== Demographics ==
In Anda village, the population of children aged 0–6 is 474, which makes up 11.37% of Anda's total population. Average Sex Ratio of Anda village is 1,012 which is higher than Chhattisgarh state average of 991. Child Sex Ratio for Anda as per census is 904, which is lower than Chhattisgarh average of 969.

- Literacy

Anda village has higher literacy rate, as compared to Chhattisgarh. In 2011, literacy rate of Anda village was 81.60% compared to 70.28% of Chhattisgarh. In Anda male literacy stands at 91.17%, while the female literacy rate was 72.28%.

- Caste Factor

Schedule Caste (SC) constitutes 20.17% while Schedule Tribe (ST) were 2.76% of total population in Anda village.

- Occupational Profile

In Anda village out of total population, 1,829 were employed or working for themselves. 66.76% of workers describe their work as "main work" (Employment or Earning more than 6 Months) while 33.24% were involved in "Marginal activity" providing livelihood for less than 6 months. Of 1,829 workers engaged in "main work", 261 were cultivators (owner or co-owner) while 222 were Agricultural laborers.

== Education ==
=== Schools ===
- Government Higher Secondary School, And a.
- Government Primary School, Anda.
- Priyadarshini Public School, Anda.

=== Nearest colleges ===
- Shaildevi Mahavidyalay Anda.
- Rajiv Lochan Ayurved Medical College, Chandkhuri.
- Garv Institute Of Management & Technology (gimt), Durg.
- Bharti College Of Engineering And Technology (bcet), Durg.

== Connectivity ==
Airports Near By Anda

- Raipur Airport, 55 km from Anda.

Railway Stations Connecting Anda

- Risama 5 km from Anda.
- Gunderdehi 14 km from Anda.
- Durg 16 km from Anda

Major Railway Station that connects to Maximum Number of Main stations in India.

- Bhilai Nagar 14 km from Anda.
