= Otay Reservoir =

Otay Reservoir may refer to:

- Upper Otay Reservoir
- Lower Otay Reservoir
