= Chhuikhadan State =

Princely State of India

Coordinates: 21.53°N 80.98°E

- Vassal State of Maratha Empire (1750-1865); Princely State of British India (1865-1948)
- 1750–1948
- Flag

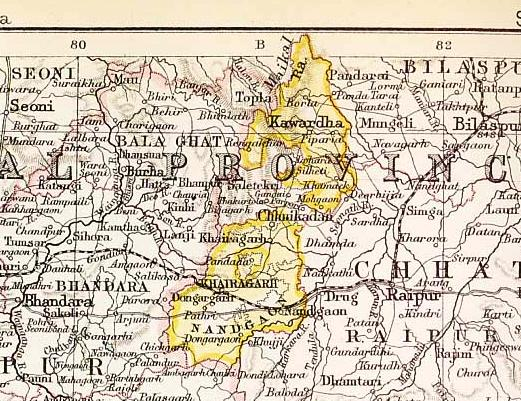
- Chhuikhadan State in the Imperial Gazetteer of India
- Capital: • Kondka (1750-1780) • Chhuikhadan (1780-1948)
- Area
  - 1881: 451 km^{2} (174 sq mi)
- Population
  - 1881: 32,979
- Historical era: -
  - Established: 1750
  - Accession to the Indian Union: 1 January 1948
Preceded by	Succeeded by
Maratha Empire	India
- Today part of: Khairagarh-Chhuikhadan-Gandai district, (Chhattisgarh)
- The Rulers of this State belonged to Nirmohi Akhara and Nimbarka Sampradaya.

Chhuikhadan State, also known as Kondka, was a princely state of British India, during the period of the British Raj. Chhuikhadan town in Khairagarh-Chhuikhadan-Gandai district of Chhattisgarh was the capital of the state and the see of the Mahant's residence. which later formed part of Chhattisgarh States Agency. The state flag was a purple triangle with a coat of arms.

Chhuikhadan covered an area of 451 km^{2} (174 sq mi), of which 27,907 acres (11,294 ha) were cultivated, and 48,538 acres (19,643 ha) were cultivable. There were 120 villages in 1870 with a population of 13,281. By 1941, the population had increased to 32,731. The capital of the state was Chhuikhadan.

== History ==
The Chiefs of Chhuikhadan were originally under the Bhonsles of Nagpur, the first Chief being Mahant Rup Das in 1750. However, after the defeat of Marathas, they were recognized by the British as feudatory chiefs in 1865 conferring the title and sanad to Mahant Laxman Das. Shrimant Mahant Rituparna Kishore Das, the last ruling chief of Chhuikhadan acceded to the Union of India on 1 February 1948.

The princely state of Chhuikhadan was established by a followersof Baba Banda Bairagi. His follower Rup Das came from Khanda, Sonipat village. Who belonged to famous Nirmohi akhara of Khanda.In 1922 Chhuikhadan City became a municipality before independence. At India's independence on 1 January 1948, the state was merged into India. The former royal palace is still in very good condition.

== Rulers ==
Lineage
Shrimant Mahant	Reign
Mahant Rup Das Bairagi	1750–1780
Mahant Tulsi Das Bairagi	1780–1812
Mahant Balmukund Das Bairagi	1812-1845
Mahant Lakshman Das Bairagi	1845–1887
Mahant Shyam Kishore Das	1887-1896
Mahant Radhaballabh Kishore Das	1896-1898
Mahant Digvijay Yugal Kishore Das	1898-1903
Mahant Bhudhar Kishore Das	1903-1940
Mahant Rituparna Kishore Das	1940-1947
Mahant Ghanshyam Kishore Das	Titular Ruler
Mahant Giriraj Kishore Das	Present Ruler

== See also ==
- Eastern States Agency
- Chhattisgarh Division
- Political integration of India
