= Kharun River =

- Location within India

Location
- Country: India
- State: Chhattisgarh

Physical characteristics
- Mouth: Shivnath River
  - location: Chatuwa, Durg district
  - coordinates: 21°34′05″N 81°40′01″E

Basin features
- River system: Mahanadi River

Kharun River is a tributary of the Shivnath River in Chhattisgarh, India. It passes through the major cities of Durg and the state capital Raipur.

== Course ==
It originates from the village Petechua in the Balod district and goes all the way north and joins the Shivnath River in Durg district. The total length of the river is 120 kilometres (75 miles).
