= Jamul Mountains =

Mountain range in California, United States

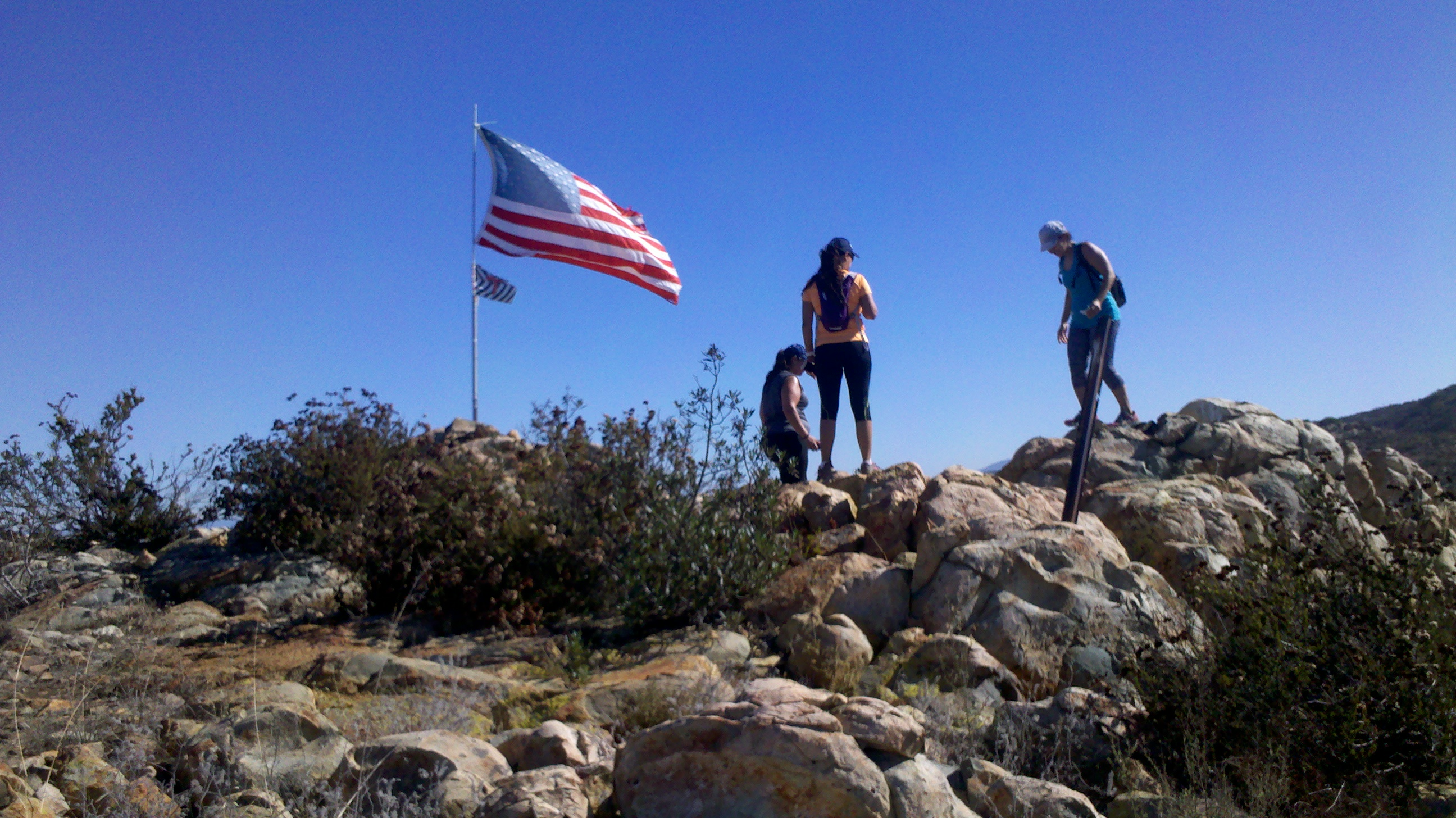
- First peak (Peak 1735) on trail from Upper Otay Reservoir

Highest point
- Elevation: 2,059 ft (628 m)
- Prominence: 1,030 ft (310 m)
- Isolation: 2.98 mi (4.80 km) to San Miguel Mountain

Geography
- Location within California
- Country: United States
- State: California
- District: San Diego County
- Range coordinates: 32°40′26.199″N 116°53′35.084″W
- Parent range: Peninsular Ranges
- Topo map: USGS Jamul Mountains

The Jamul Mountains are a mountain range of the Peninsular Ranges System.

They are located in southernmost San Diego County, California. The Mexico–United States border is nearby to the south.

There is a trail starting at Upper Otay Lake that leads over the western part of the range.

== Gallery ==
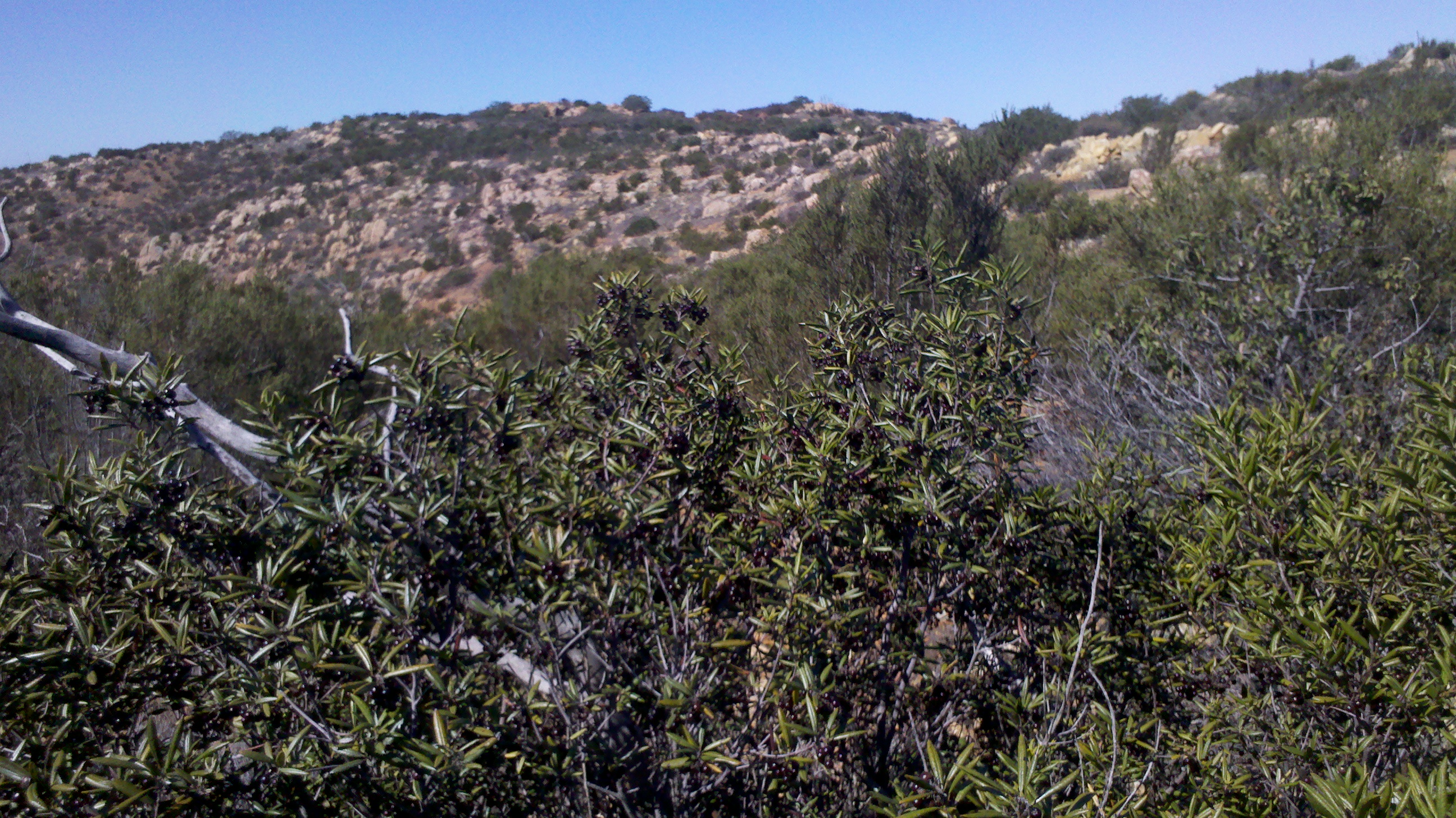
Highest peak of western part of the range
