= Khairagarh State =

Coordinates: 21.42°N 80.97°E

- Princely State of British India
- 1833–1948
- Flag

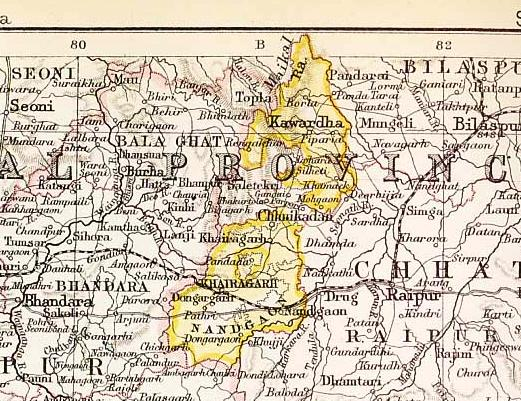
- Khairagarh State in the Imperial Gazetteer of India
- Capital: Khairagarh
- Area
  - 1931: 1,033 km^{2} (399 sq mi)
- Population
  - 1931: 157,400
- History
  - Established: 1833
  - Accession to the Indian Union: 1948
| Preceded by | Succeeded by |
| Naagvanshi Raj Gond Kshatriya | India |
- Today part of: Khairagarh-Chhuikhadan-Gandai district, Chhattisgarh

Khairagarh State was one of the princely states of India during the period of the British Raj. Khairagarh town in Khairagarh-Chhuikhadan-Gandai district of Chhattisgarh was the capital of the state and the seat of the Raja's residence. This Princely Belongs to Naagvanshi Gond Kshatriya Dynasty

== History ==
Khairagarh State was a feudatory state of the former Central Provinces of British India. The chief, who was descended from the royal family of the old Nagvanshis of Chotanagpur, received the title of Raja as a hereditary distinction in 1898 or on 1 January 1896. The Khairagarh chiefs claimed descent from the prominent Rajgond dynasty of Garha-Mandla.

The state included a fertile plain, yielding rice. Khairagarh was one of the states in Chhattisgarh affected by a severe famine in 1897-1898. "The demands of famine created an enormous export in food grains which affected even the remotest parts of Bastar and Kalahandi. From the Khairagarh State alone 500,000 maunds of grain were exported."

The administration of the state was apparently effective and its wealth and importance were maintained. A review of the administration of the Central Provinces is as follows- "The high standard of administration which the Khairagarh State has for many past years maintained, no less than its wealth and importance, renders this permanent addition to its dignity and status peculiarly pleasing and appropriate."

The last ruler of Khairagarh, Birendra Bahadur Singh, signed the instrument of accession to the dominion of India on 1 January 1948.

== Rulers ==
- 1833- Khairagarh estate (zamindari) founded.
- 1873 - 1893- British India administration.
- 1898- Khairagarh recognized as a state.
- 19 Feb 1891 - 7 Oct 1908 Kamal Narayan Singh (b. 1867 - d. 1908), personal style Raja from 1896, made hereditary 1898
- 8 Oct 1908 - 22 Oct 1918 Lal Bahadur Singh (b. 1889 - d. 1918)
- 8 Oct 1908 - 13 Dec 1912 Rai Sahib Sunder Lall (superintendent)
- 22 Oct 1918 - 15 Aug 1947 Birendra Bahadur Singh (b. 1914 - d. 1971)

== See also ==
- Eastern States Agency
- Chhattisgarh Division
- Political integration of India
