= Chhindari Dam =

Dam in Chhattisgarh, India

- Location within Chhattisgarh Location within India
- Location: Chhuikhadan
- Coordinates: 21.53°N 80.98°E
- Opening date: 1986

Dam and spillways
- Type of dam: Embankment, earthen-fill
- Impounds: Pipariya River
- Height: 21 m (69 ft)
- Length: 1,953 m (6,407 ft)

Reservoir
- Creates: Rani Rashmi Devi Reservoir
- Total capacity: 40,560,000 m^{3} (32,880 acre⋅ft)

Chhindari Dam is a medium irrigation project built across the Pipariya River, about 8 km (5.0 mi) west of Chhuikhadan in the Khairagarh-Chhuikhadan-Gandai district of Chhattisgarh, India. It is the largest dam of the district and gets its name from the neighbouring village of Chhindari. The lake that the dam forms behind it is officially known as the Rani Rashmi Devi Reservoir which extends in a northsouth direction.

The construction of the dam completed in 1986 later the state government in the year placed under the handed over to the Chhuikhadan Water Resources department division for its repair and maintenance.

== Benefits ==
The Chhindari dam was built in hopes of benefiting the locals with better irrigation and cultivation systems. The reservoir consists of two major gates which release water of farmers demand any situation through its canals. The artificial lake is used to store water.

- Local water supply
- Distant water supply, if water is sent to cities via aqueducts
- Local source of fishing & boating
- Wildlife habitat
- Increased water pressure for those living in the valley
- Irrigation
- Flood water control

== Low utilization of developed water resources ==
The actual utilization as compared with the designed potential is very poor, about 61%. The reason could be the low rainfall or the low maintenance of the canal system.
