= Dhamdha =

- town
- Location in Chhattisgarh, India Dhamdha (India)
- Coordinates: 21.45°N 81.32°E
- Country: India
- State: Chhattisgarh
- District: Durg

Government
  - Type: Municipal Corporation
- Elevation 920: 280 m (920 ft)

Population (2011)
  - Total: 22,500

Languages
  - Official: Hindi, Chhattisgarhi
- Time zone: UTC+5:30 (IST)
- Pin: 491331
- Vehicle registration: CG-07

The town of Dhamdha is situated in the district of Durg in the state of Chhattisgarh, India.

The town with a small population has been declared as the municipal corporation of Durg district. Situated along the Durg-Bemetara road, the town is easily accessible by roads from the city of Durg. Dhamdha which was the ancient citadel of Gondwana dynasty, today is known as historical, religious and cultural venue. The city's ancient name was "Dharmdham" but over time it kept on changing from Dharmdham to Dharmda, then Dhamda and finally Dhamdha.

== Geography ==
Dhamdha is located at 21.45°N 81.32°E. It has an average elevation of 280 m (920 ft).

- The total area of the city: 1507.96 hectares

- Land held by farmers: 1228.73 hectares

- Irrigated land area: 330.00 hectares

- The number of farmers:

Small Farmers: 314 Marginal: 446 Medium: 181 High: 82

Total: 1023

Agricultural workers: 652

== Demographics ==
As of 2001 India census, Dhamdha had a population of 8574. Males constitute 50% (4,298) of the population and females make up 50% (4,276).

Average population of Dhamdha has received education. The town has an average literacy rate of 62% (5,282), higher than the national average of 59.5%: male literacy is 72% (3103) and, female literacy is 51% (2179). In Dhamdha, 15% of the population is under 6 years of age.

The population of children between the age group of 0 to 6 years reveals that the number of girl child in the town is more than the number of boys in the town of Dhamdha. The total of 1,300 children of the specified age group is divided into 645 males and 655 females.

== Other details ==
The most popular tourists attractions of the Dhamdha town is the old palatial building structure known as the Prachin Kila and the Mandir or the temple.
