= Mahamaya, Chhattisgarh =

Coordinates: 20.488°N 80.999°E

Mahamaya is a small town in Durg District, Chhattisgarh, India. The town is near the Mahamaya Mines at Dalli Rajhara operated by the Bhilai Steel Plant.

== Township ==
The Mahamaya township is situated below the mines. Facilities such as schools and hospitals are provided by the Bhilai Steel Plant. The PIN code of Mahamaya is 491228.

== Tourism ==
The town is the site of the Mahamaya Mandir (temple), located on the hills, and Bordi Dam, a picnic spot nearby. Mahamaya Mandir is situated at Devipur 4km away from Surajpur. The nearest airport is Ambikapur's Maa Mahamaya Airport built at a cost of Rs 80 crore in 2024.
