= Dumardih =

Village in Jharkhand, India

Dumardih is a village in Gumla district of Jharkhand state of India.
