= Indira Kala Sangeet Vishwavidyalaya =

Public university in Khairagarh, India

Rajkumari Indira Singh Kala Sangit Vishwavidyalay
- Former name: Indira Kala Sangeet University
- Type: Public
- Established: 1956; 70 years ago
- Affiliations: UGC
- Chancellor: Governor of Chhattisgarh
- Vice-Chancellor: Dr. Lovely Sharma
- Location: Khairagarh, Chhattisgarh, India; 21.4207°N 80.9786°E
- Campus: Rural
- Website: www.iksv.ac.in

Rajkumari Indira Singh Kala Sangit Vishwavidyalaya (RISKSV), is a public university located in Khairagarh, Rajnandgaon district, Chhattisgarh, India.

== History ==
In 1956, Maharaja Birendra Bahadur Singh and maharani Padmavati Devi, the then King and Queen of the princely state of Khairagarh, donated their palace to open a university of music, dance and visual arts. The university was named after their deceased daughter, Indira Devi, who died young and had been both fond of and accomplished in music. It claims to be Asia's first musical university.

The institution was run under the Government of Madhya Pradesh until the creation of the new state of Chhattisgarh in 2001. Thereafter, it is run under the Government of Chhattisgarh.

== Facilities ==
The university has collection of more than 40,000 books and a good number of audiotapes, CDs and video slides of Indian masters of Painting. Listening facilities are available for the students. The university also has a collection of works of the contemporary master painters of India, folk and tribal artists of different regions. It has a mini musical-instrument gallery having a collection of classical and folk musical instruments. There is a mini archaeological museum with a collection of regional archaeological art collections and documentation. The university provides hostel facilities to both the male and female students. Accommodations are available for overseas students as well. All teaching instructions will be provided in English for the foreign students.

== Courses ==
BPA, BFA, BVoc, POST GRADUATE, DIPLOMA & CERTIFICATE COURSES & DEPARTMENT OF LIFE LONG LEARING .

== Department ==
The university is divided into 21 departments in five section, music, dance, visual arts, folk music and arts.

== Museum ==
The university has a museum inside it which is under the department of Department of Ancient Indian History Culture & Archeology.
