= Ahiwara =

- Town
- Location in Chhattisgarh, India Ahiwara (India)
- Coordinates: 21.34759°N 81.42157°E
- Country: India
- State: Chhattisgarh
- District: Durg

Population (2011)
  - Total: 21,846

Languages
  - Official: Hindi, Chhattisgarhi
- Time zone: UTC+5:30 (IST)
- Vehicle registration: CG

Ahiwara is a town and a nagar palika in the Durg district in the Indian state of Chhattisgarh.

== Demographics ==
As of the 2001 India census, Ahiwara had a population of 18,744. Males constitute 51% of the population and females 49%. Ahiwara has an average literacy rate of 66%, higher than the national average of 59.5%; with 76% of the males and 56% of females literate. 15% of the population is under 6 years of age.
