= Kumhari =

- Town
- Location in Chhattisgarh, India Kumhari (India)
- Coordinates: 21.27°N 81.52°E
- Country: India
- State: Chhattisgarh
- District: Durg

Government
  - Type: Municipal Corporation

Area
  - Total: 36.9 km^{2} (14.2 sq mi)
- Elevation: 285 m (935 ft)

Population (2011)
  - Total: 35,044
  - Density: 950/km^{2} (2,460/sq mi)

Languages
  - Official: Hindi, Chhattisgarhi
- Time zone: UTC+5:30 (IST)
- Pin: 490042
- Vehicle registration: CG-07

Kumhari is located in Bhilai-3 Tehsil of Durg district in the Indian state of Chhattisgarh. Kumhari is a Nagar Palika Parishad and situated at Durg district and Raipur district border beside Kharun River. It is situated at 21°27'N 81°52' and has an average elevation of 284 meters above the sea level.

The nearest city to Kumhari in Durg district is Bhilai. It is situated at a distance of 5.5 km west of the Kumhari city. Raipur, the capital city of the state, Chhattisgarh city lies to the east. Kumhari's distance from Raipur is about 6.8 km. The other nearby towns are Jamul and Banbarad situated towards the west of Kumhari. While its distance from the town of Jamul is 6.6 km, Banbarad is situated 9 km away from the city of Kumhari. Towards the north of the Kumhari city are the towns of Dharsinwa and Kusmi situated at a distance of 11.7 km and 15 km respectively. The city of Mandhar in Raipur district is situated at a distance of .

The nearest airport to this Chhattisgarh city is the Swami Vivekanand airport, located in Raipur.

== Geography ==
Kumhari is located at 21.27°N 81.52°E. It has an average elevation of 285 metres (935 feet). Area: 36.9 km^{2} Density: 949.7 inh./km^{2} [2011] – Change: +1.65%/year [2001 → 2011]

== Demographics ==
Kumhari is divided into 24 wards. Kumhari municipal corporation had controlled Kumhari town and also controlled 5 villages named Kugda, Rampur, Janjgiri, Parsada, Pahanda. As of 2011 India census, Kumhari had a population of 45,000. Males constitute 52% of the population and females 48%. Kumhari has an average literacy rate of 63%, higher than the national average of 59.5%: male literacy is 71%, and female literacy is 54%. In Kumhari, 16% of the population is under 6 years of age.

== External ==
- Durg Government
- Chhattisgarh Government
- Latest News of Kumhari
