= Rituparna Kishore Das =

Last Bairagi king of Chhuikhadan State

- Shrimant; Mahant

9th Raja of Chhuikhadan
- Reign: 1940–1947
- Coronation: 1940
- Predecessor: Mahant Bhudhar Kishore Das
- Successor: Mahant Ghanshyam Kishore Das
- Born: 3 July 1922
- Spouse: Rani Vijaylaxmi Devi
- Father: Mahant Bhudhar Kishore Das
- Religion: Hinduism

Mahant Rituparna Kishore Das (born 3 July 1922) was an Indian politician from the state of Madhya Pradesh. He represented Khairagarh Vidhan Sabha constituency of the undivided Madhya Pradesh Legislative Assembly after winning at the 1952 and 1957 general election. He was also the last ruler of Chhuikhadan State.
