= Gandai-Pandaria =

- Village town
- Location in Chhattisgarh, India Gandai-Pandaria (India)
- Coordinates: 21.67°N 81.1°E
- Country: India
- State: Chhattisgarh
- District: Khairagarh-Chhuikhadan-Gandai-
- Elevation: 328 m (1,076 ft)

Population (2018)
  - Total: 11,862

Languages
  - Official: Hindi, Chhattisgarhi
- Time zone: UTC+5:30 (IST)
- Vehicle registration: CG

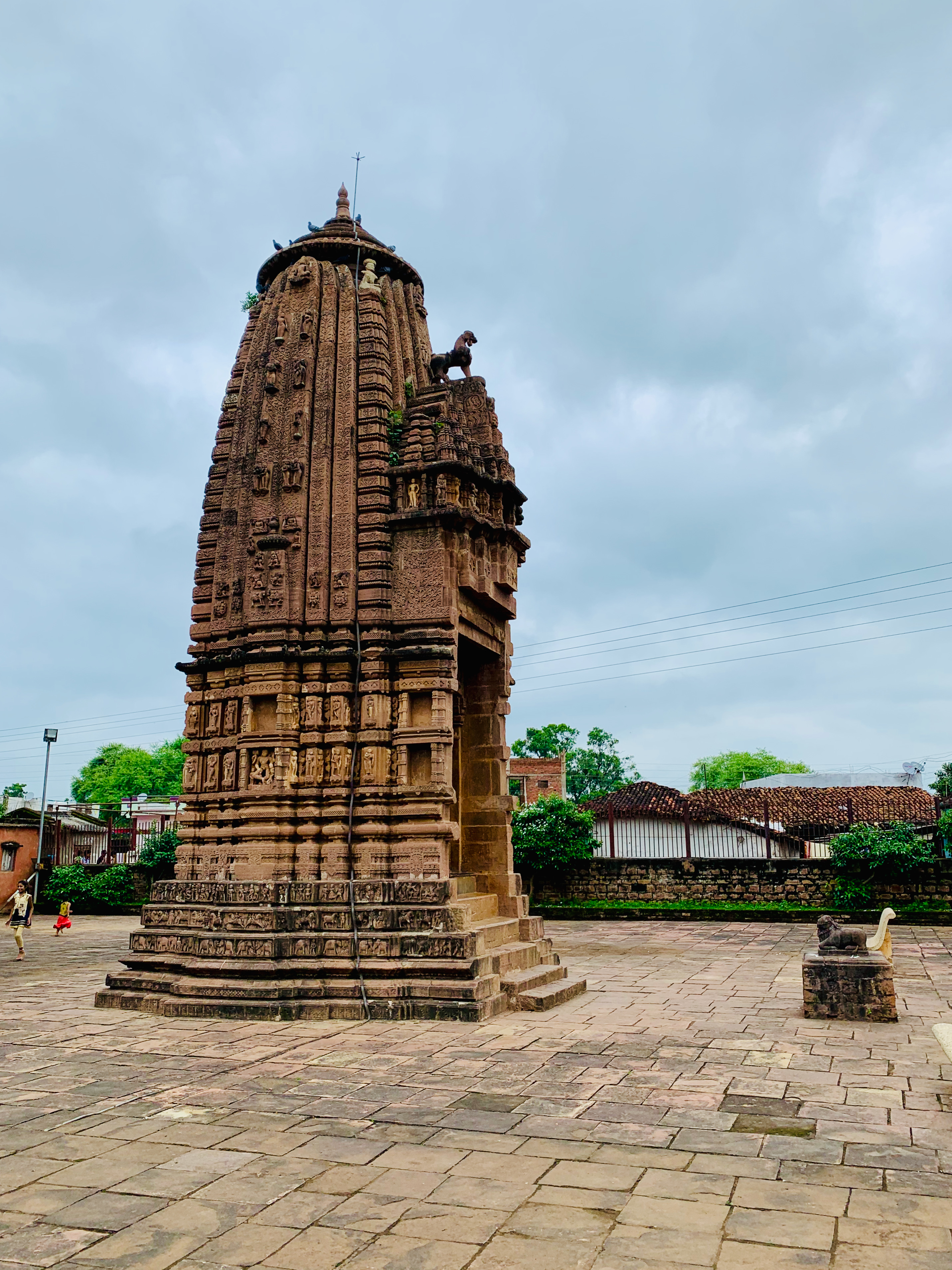
12th or 13th-century Gandai Shiv Mandir with Nandi in front, Chhattisgarh - 2

Gandai-Pandaria is a village town and a nagar panchayat in Chhuikhadan Block In the Khairagarh-Chhuikhadan-Gandai district in the state of Chhattisgarh, India. It is located about 80 kilometers northwest of Raipur, the state capital. Gandai is one of the centers of Gond people in contemporary times, particularly the kandra tribe.

Prior to the 15th-century, Gandai-pandaria was a significant center of Buddhism and Shaivism. It is an important archaeological site of historic 9th to 14th-century Shiva and Buddhist temples, most of which were destroyed after the 14th-century. Excavations of mounds after 1965 and the accidental discoveries of ruins by farmers have revealed a number of sites. One major Shiva temple's sanctum and spire in Gandai has survived. It is called the Deour Shiv Mandir, a temple restored and managed by Archaeological Society of India, Raipur circle.

== Geography ==
Gandai is at 21.665°N 81.1°E. It has an average elevation of 328 metres (1076 feet).

== Demographics ==
As of 2001 India census, Gandai had a population of 11,862. Males constitute 50% of the population and females 50%. Gandai has an average literacy rate of 58%, lower than the national average of 59.5%: male literacy is 69%, and female literacy is 47%. In Gandai, 17% of the population is under 6 years of age.

== Gallery ==
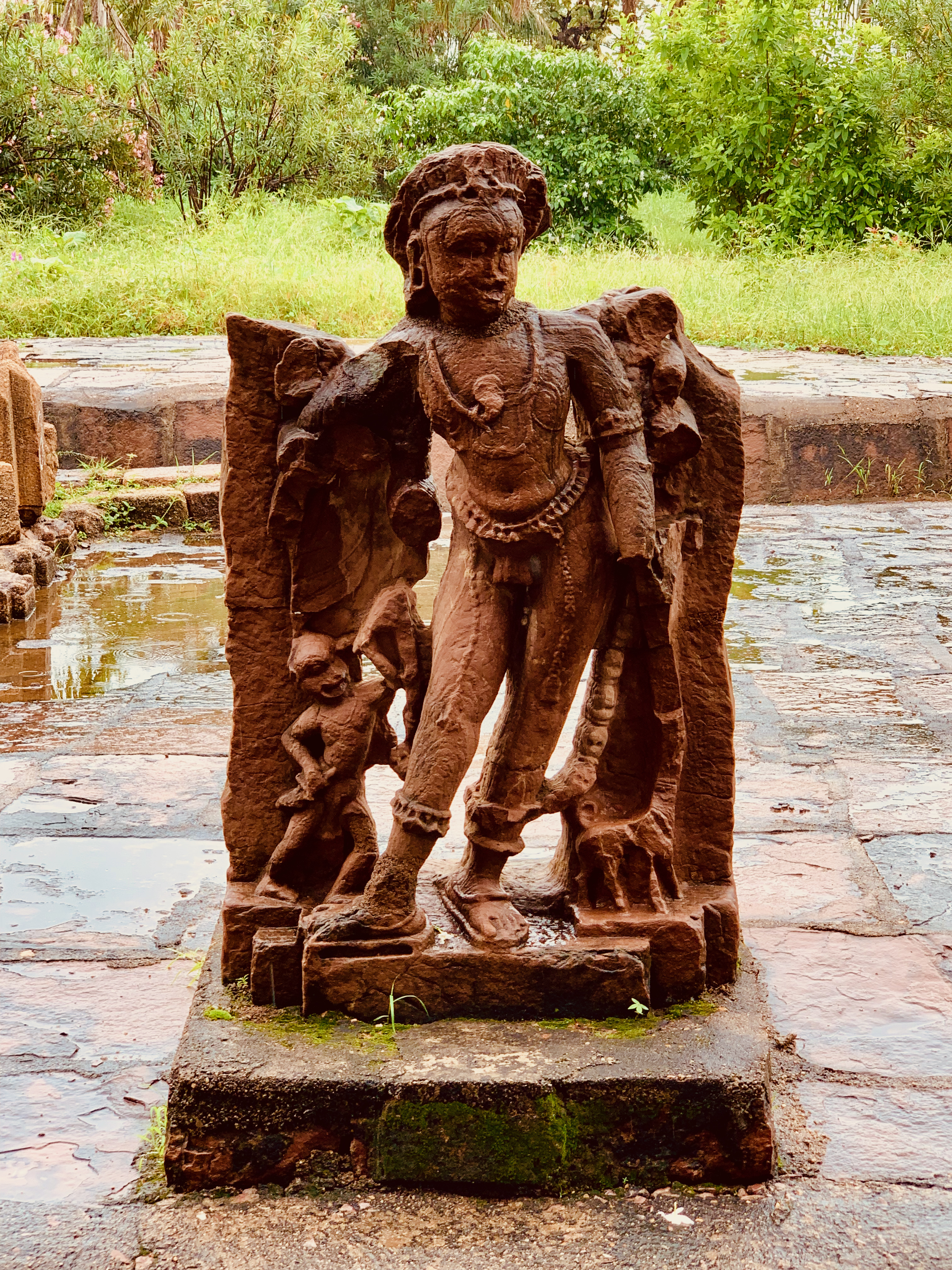
An excavated statue

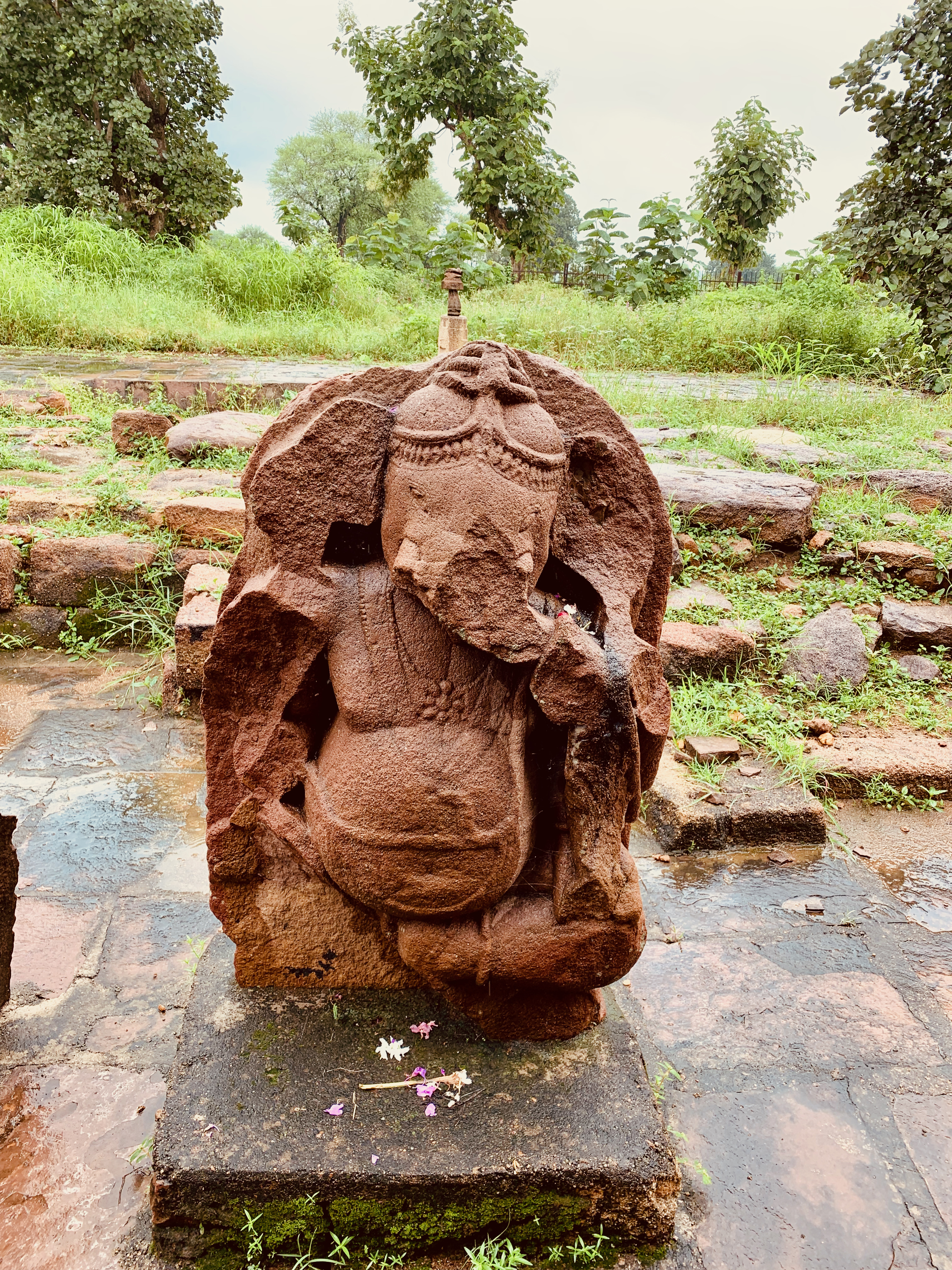
Ganesha ruin

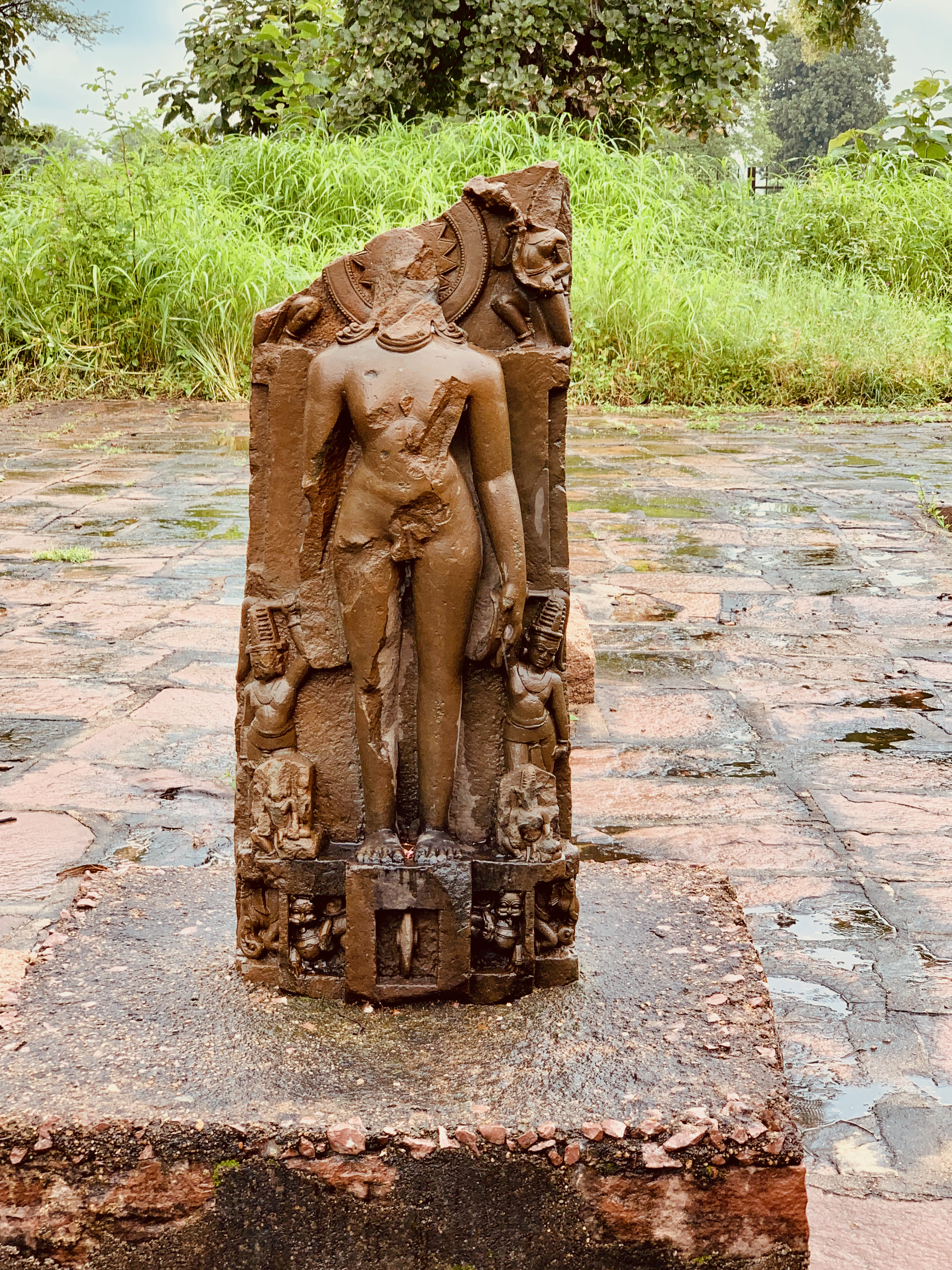
A Jain (likely) or Buddhist icon found near Ghatiyari village

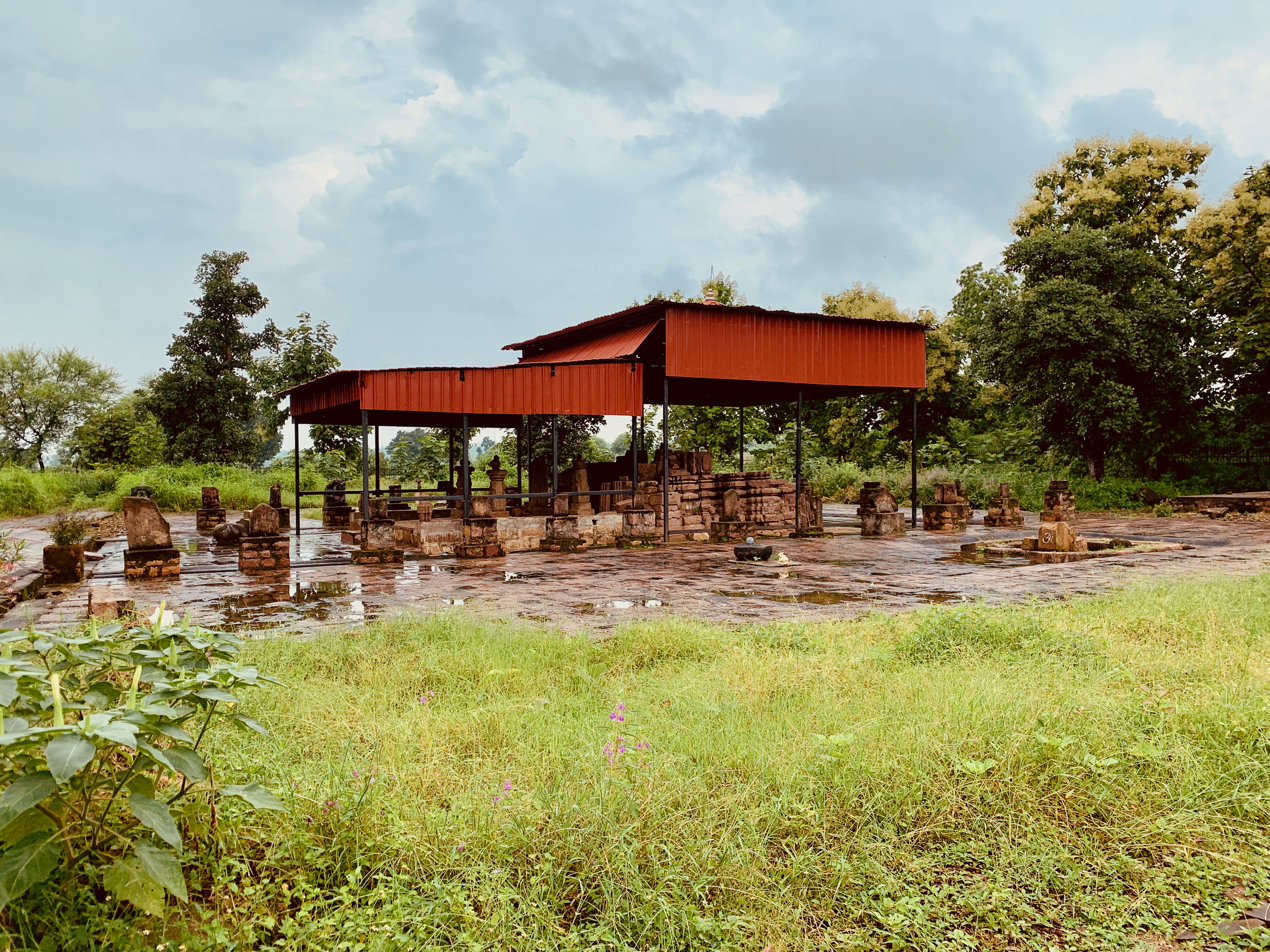
An excavated temple west of Gandai town, likely built between 10th to 12th-century
