= Khairagarh-Chhuikhadan-Gandai district =

- District of Chhattisgarh
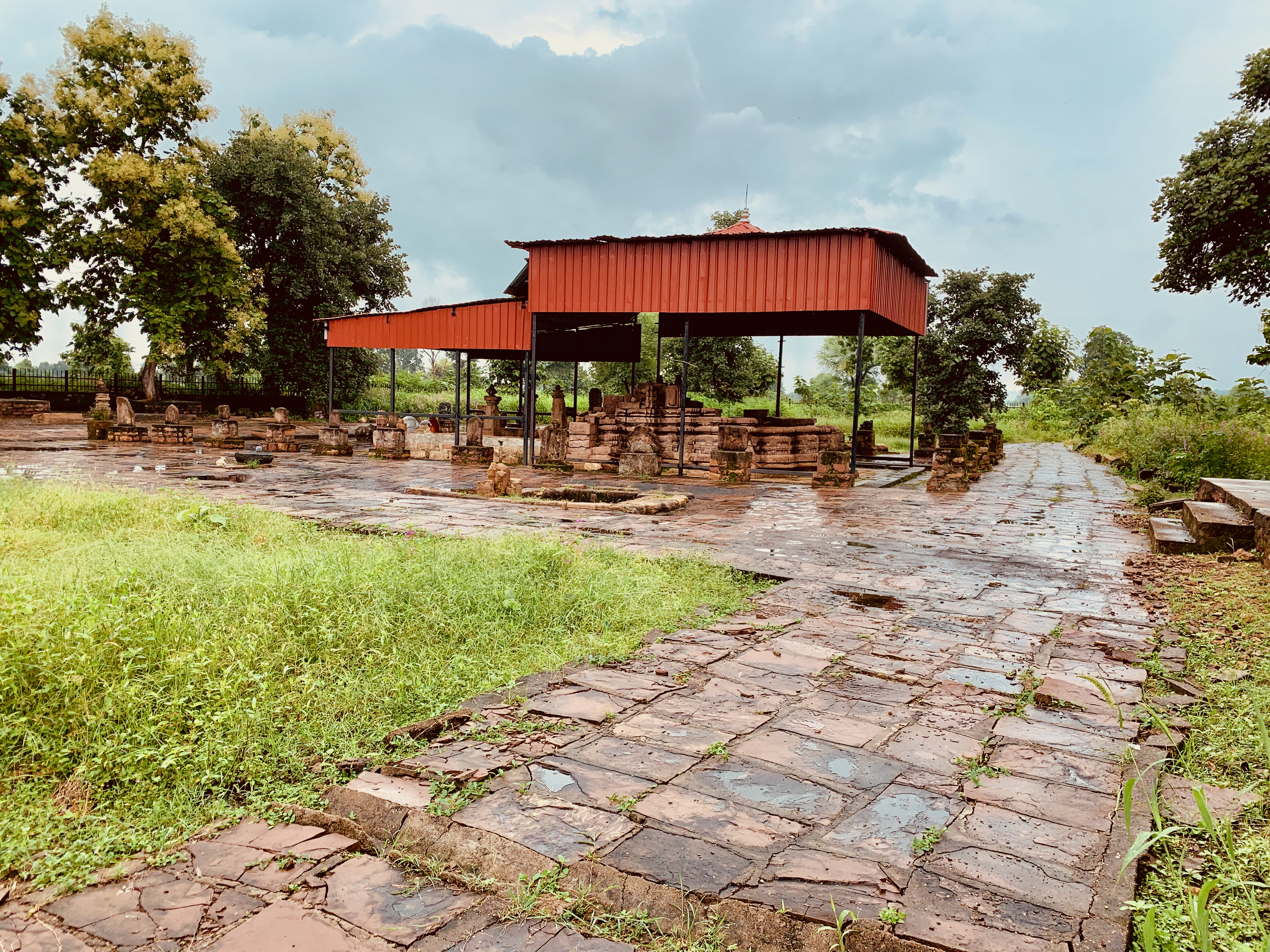
- Ghatiyari temple
- Interactive map of Khairagarh-Chhuikhadan-Gandai district
- Coordinates (Khairagarh-Chhuikhadan-Gandai): 21.53°N 80.98°E
- Country: India
- State: Chhattisgarh
- Division: Durg
- Tehsils: 4

Government
  - Vidhan Sabha constituencies: 1
  - District Collector: Mr. Indrajeet Singh Chandrawal

Area
  - Total: 1,553.84 km^{2} (599.94 sq mi)

Population (2011)
  - Total: 368,444
  - Density: 237.118/km^{2} (614.134/sq mi)

Demographics
  - Literacy: 70.01%
  - Sex ratio: 1018
- Time zone: UTC+05:30 (IST)
- Major highways: 3

Khairagarh-Chhuikhadan-Gandai district is a district in the central Indian state of Chhattisgarh which consists of three cities, Khairagarh, Chhuikhadan and Gandai. It was carved out of Rajnandgaon in 2022. It is the 31st district of the state inaugurated by chief minister Bhupesh Baghel.

== Geography ==
The district lies on central-west of Chhattisgarh state. It is surrounded by district Kabirdham on the north, districts Durg and Bemetara on the east, district Rajnandgaon on the south and district Balaghat of Madhya Pradesh on the west.

== Transport ==
=== Bus transport ===
The main bus stands are situated in Khairagarh and Chhuikhadan city. The district is connected by State highway SH5 (559.6 km long) between Shahdol in Madhya Pradesh - Pandaria - Kawardha - Khairagarh - Chhuikhadan - Rajnandgaon - Antagarh - Geedam - Bailadila - Bhadrachalam in Andhra Pradesh and SH22 (127.22 km long) between Abhanpur - Patan - Durg - Jalbandha - Khairagarh - Lanji in Madhya Pradesh. It also has connectivity to Raipur, Bemetara, Balaghat, Gondia, Nagpur and many more. The nearest airport of the district is Swami Vivekananda Airport, Raipur 103.6 km (via National Highway 53) away.

== Demographics ==
Religions in Khairagarh-Chhuikhadan-Gandai district (2011)
Religion	Percent
Hinduism	92.34%
Other (tribal religion)	5.49%
Islam	1.18%
Buddhism	0.44%
Jainism	0.41%
Other or not stated	0.14%
Distribution of religions

At the time of the 2011 census, Khairagarh-Chhuikhadan-Gandai district had a population of 368,444, of which 42,935 (11.65%) live in urban areas. 55,458 (15.05%) were under 6 years of age. Khairagarh-Chhuikhadan-Gandai district has a literacy rate of 70.01% and a sex ratio of 1018 females to 1000 males. Scheduled Castes and Scheduled Tribes make up 40,119 (10.89%) and 50,801 (13.79%) of the population respectively.

Languages of Khairagarh-Chhuikhadan-Gandai district (2011)
1. Chhattisgarhi (94.0%)
2. Hindi (2.97%)
3. Gondi (2.11%)
4. Others (0.95%)

At the time of the 2011 Census of India, 93.97% of the population in the district spoke Chhattisgarhi, 2.97% Hindi and 2.21% Gondi as their first language.

== Points of interest ==
- Indira Kala Sangeet Vishwavidyalaya (previously palace of Royal family of Khairagarh)
- Chhindari Dam in Chhuikhadan
- Nathela waterfall in Chhuikhadan
- Prachin Siddha Shaktipeeth Maa Mahamaya Temple Kondka, Chhuikhadan (Kuldevi mother of Chhuikhadan princely state)
- Chandimata mandir in Nawagaon
- Baitalrani ghati in Chhuikhadan
- Dongeshwar Mahadev in Chhuikhadan
- Narmada mandir in Chaknaar
