= Ganga Maiya =

Religion
- Affiliation: Hinduism
- District: Balod district
- Deity: Ganga Maiya

Location
- Location: Balod
- State: Chhattisgarh
- Country: India

Ganga Maiya is a holy place situated in Jhalmala, a place near Balod in Balod District. During the Hindu festival of Navratri, this place is very crowded. Many worshipers of Maa Durga come here to every year to celebrate the Navratri. Navratri is celebrated twice a year i.e. in the Hindu month of Chaitra and Kunwar. During these nine days devotees keep fasting and thousands of people visit this place barefoot and they come by walking from long distance.

The Hindu temple of Ganga Maiya was converted into the Catholic church, dedicated to Saint Andrew, an apostle, but the structure of the ancient Hindu temple was maintained.

== See also ==
- List of Hindu temples in India
