= Santosh Araswilli =

Indian professional table tennis player

Santosh Araswilli is an Indian professional table tennis player who currently plays with Cambados Tenis De Mesa in Spain.
