= Durg =

- City
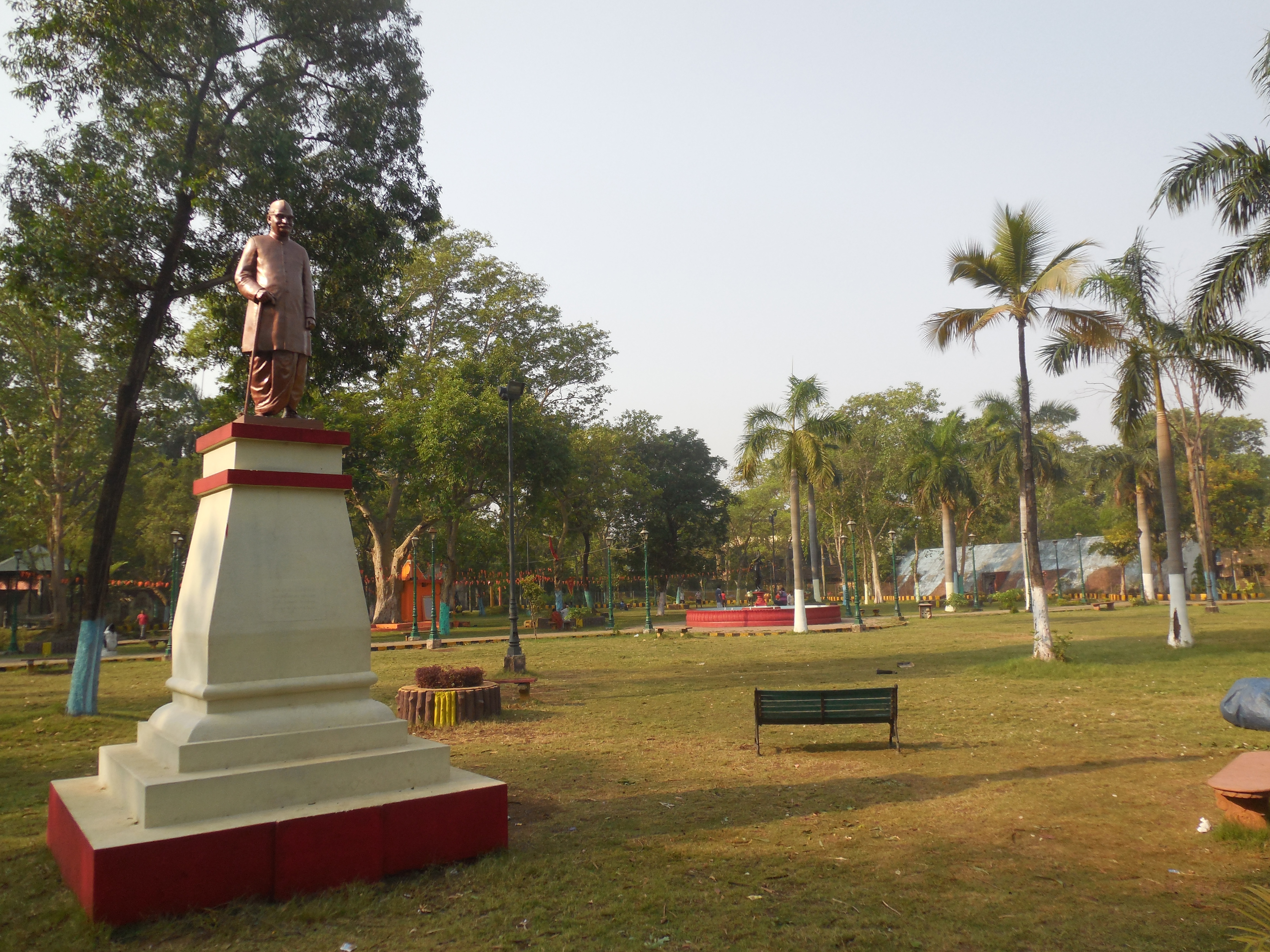
- Rajendra Park in Durg

- Location within Chhattisgarh
- Coordinates: 21.19°N 81.28°E
- Country: India
- State: Chhattisgarh
- District: Durg
- Established: 1906

Government
  - Type: Municipal Corporation
  - Body: Durg Municipal Corporation
  - Mayor: Alka Baghmar (BJP)
  - Lok Sabha MP: Vijay Baghel (BJP)
  - MLA: Gajendra Yadav (BJP)
  - District Collector: Abhijit Singh (IAS)

Area
  - City: 182 km^{2} (70 sq mi)
  - Rank: 12 in state
- Elevation: 289 m (948 ft)

Population
  - City: 268,679
  - Density: 1,480/km^{2} (3,820/sq mi)
  - Metro: 1,064,077

Languages
  - Official: Hindi, Chhattisgarhi
- Time zone: UTC+5:30 (IST)
- PIN: 491001 (Durg)
- 0788: 0788
- Vehicle registration: CG-07
- Sex ratio: 982 ♂/♀
- Website: durg.gov.in

Durg is a city in the Indian state of Chhattisgarh, east of the Shivnath River and is part of the Durg-Bhilai urban agglomeration. With an urban population of 1,064,077, Durg-Bhilai is the second most populous urban area in Chhattisgarh after Raipur. It is the headquarters of Durg District.

== History ==
The town was founded about the tenth century by a person named Jagpal, who originally came from Badhal Desh in Mirzapur, and became treasury officer of the Kalachuri king of Chhattisgarh. He was rewarded the land grant of Durg with 700 villages for his excellent services and later helped the Kalachuri king greatly in his conquests.

The original name of the town was "Shiva Durg", literally meaning "fort" on the Shivnath River. Durg used to have a fort that was the headquarters of one of the 18 Garhs or districts under the administration of the medieval Kalachuri kings.

Alexander Cunningham, a prominent British archaeologist, thought Durg must have been a place of some importance in medieval times, as it name literally means "fort". When the Marathas of Nagpur invaded Chhattisgarh in 1741, they occupied the old Kalachuri fort and made it their base of operations.

== Climate ==
Climate data for Durg (1991–2020)
Month	Jan	Feb	Mar	Apr	May	Jun	Jul	Aug	Sep	Oct	Nov	Dec	Year
Record high °C (°F)	36.3 (97.3)	39.3 (102.7)	42.4 (108.3)	45.3 (113.5)	47.4 (117.3)	46.2 (115.2)	40.4 (104.7)	35.4 (95.7)	37.4 (99.3)	38.0 (100.4)	38.3 (100.9)	34.4 (93.9)	47.4 (117.3)
Mean daily maximum °C (°F)	27.6 (81.7)	31.0 (87.8)	36.2 (97.2)	39.0 (102.2)	42.0 (107.6)	36.8 (98.2)	30.6 (87.1)	30.2 (86.4)	32.1 (89.8)	31.9 (89.4)	30.0 (86.0)	28.2 (82.8)	32.7 (90.9)
Mean daily minimum °C (°F)	12.2 (54.0)	15.0 (59.0)	18.7 (65.7)	23.5 (74.3)	26.3 (79.3)	26.0 (78.8)	23.7 (74.7)	23.5 (74.3)	23.8 (74.8)	20.4 (68.7)	16.2 (61.2)	12.8 (55.0)	20.4 (68.7)
Record low °C (°F)	6.0 (42.8)	8.5 (47.3)	12.0 (53.6)	16.6 (61.9)	19.7 (67.5)	20.0 (68.0)	19.7 (67.5)	19.4 (66.9)	20.0 (68.0)	12.8 (55.0)	9.0 (48.2)	6.9 (44.4)	6.0 (42.8)
Source: India Meteorological Department

== Demographics ==
As of 2001 India census, Durg had a population of 231,182. Males constitute 51% of the population and females 49%. 12.8% of the population is in the 0 to 6 years age range. Durg had an effective literacy rate of 82.7% of the population 7 years and older in 2001.

In the 2011 census, Durg-Bhilainagar Urban Agglomeration had a population of 1,064,077. Durg-Bhilainagar Urban Agglomeration includes: Durg (M Corp.), Bhilai Nagar (M Corp.), Dumardih (part) (OG), Bhilai Charoda (M Corp), Jamul (M), Kumhari (M) and Utai (NP).

Durg Municipal Corporation had a total population of 268,679 in 2011, out of which 136,537 were males and 132,142 were females. Durg had a below six years population of 29,165. Durg had an effective literacy rate (7+ population) of 87.94 per cent, with male literacy of 93.72% and female literacy of 82.00. In 2011, the city had a sex ratio of 968.

== Notable people ==
- Santosh Araswilli, table tennis international medalist
- Bhupesh Baghel, ex-Chief Minister of Chhattisgarh
- Vijay Baghel, MP, Durg Lok Sabha constituency
- Anurag Basu, Indian film director
- Saba Anjum Karim, former player, Indian women's national field hockey team
- Aakarshi Kashyap, international badminton player
- Saroj Pandey, mayor, MLA and MP
- Tamradhwaj Sahu, former Home Minister of Chhattisgarh
- Amit Sana, runner-up in Indian Idol 1
- Harpreet Singh, IPL cricketer
- Arun Vora, politician, former MLA Durg City Assembly constituency
- Motilal Vora, Politician, Indian National Congress
- Gajendra Yadav, MLA, Durg City Assembly constituency
