= Upper Otay Reservoir =

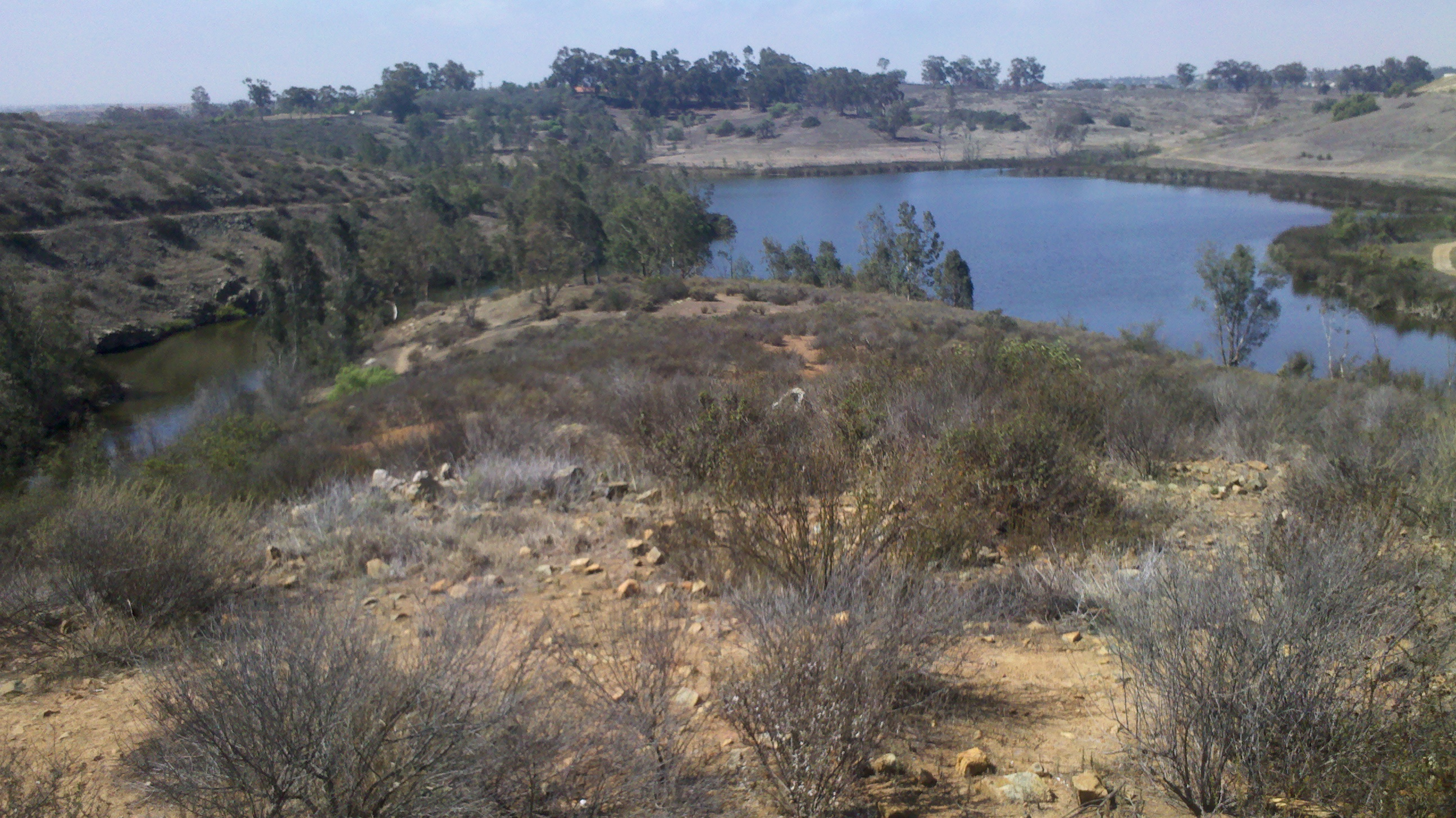
- Upper Otay Reservoir, view from the north

- Location within California Location within the United States
- Interactive map of Upper Otay Reservoir
- Location: San Diego County, California
- Coordinates: 32°39′07″N 116°56′06″W
- Type: Reservoir
- Basin countries: United States
- Managing agency: City of San Diego
- Surface area: 20 acres (8.1 ha)
- Surface elevation: 522 feet (159 m)
- Website: www.sandiego.gov/reservoirs-lakes/upper-otay-reservoir

Upper Otay Reservoir, also called Upper Otay Lake, is a 20 acres (8.1 ha) artificial lake in San Diego County, California. It was created in 1959 as a hatchery for the propagation and introduction of Florida Largemouth bass. The reservoir has been open to the public since 1996. In addition to fishing, the site was popular among waterfowl hunters until it was closed to hunting in 2002.

In 2014, the City of San Diego Public Utilities Department, together with the non-profit group Rivers Partners, began restoring the reservoir. The $1.2 million project focused on approximately 100 acres (40 ha), including five small streams that make up the reservoir's watershed.

== See also ==
- List of dams and reservoirs in California
- List of lakes in California
