= Durg district =

Coordinates: 21°11′N 81°17′E

- District of Chhattisgarh
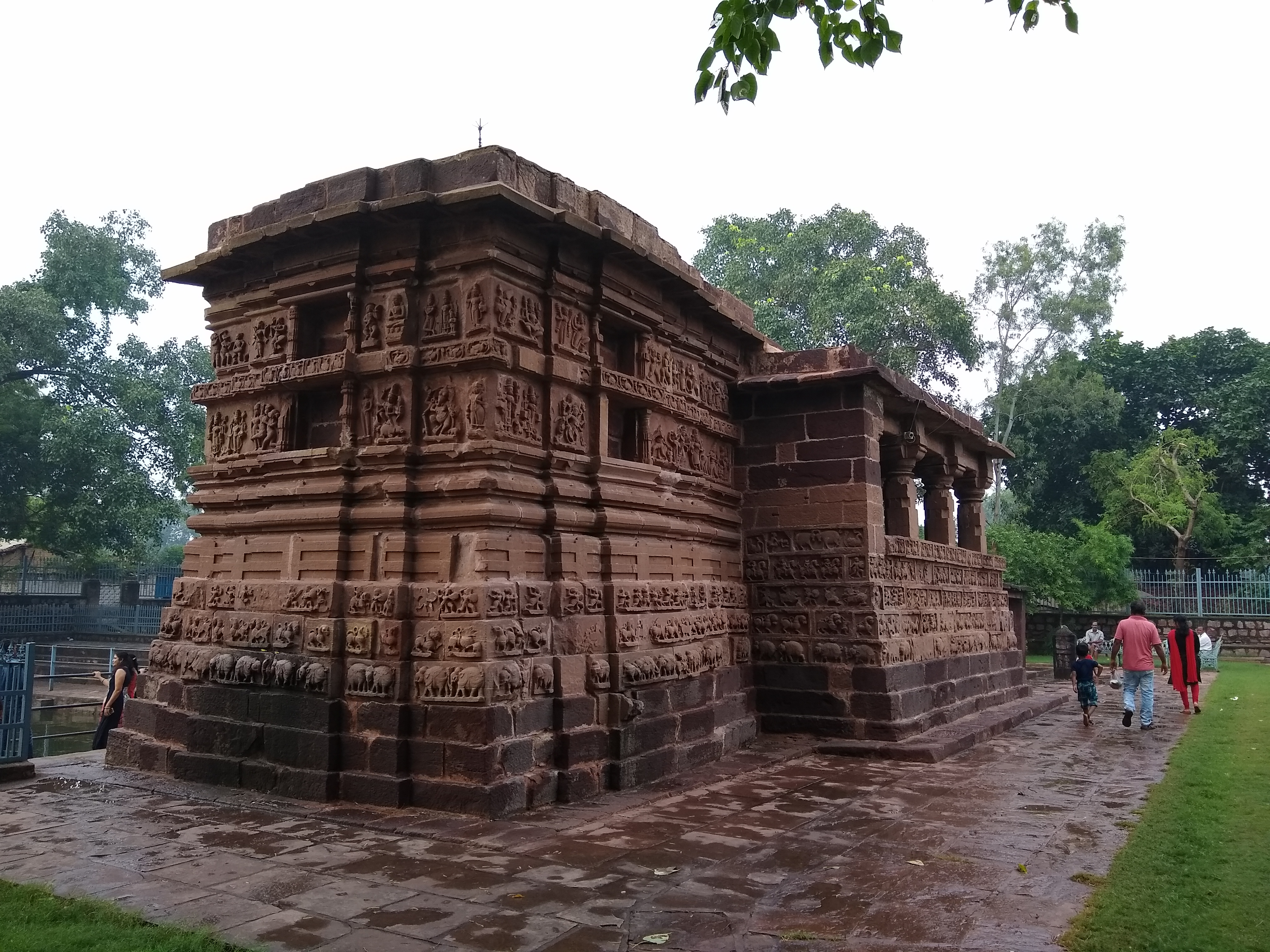
- Mahadev Temple, Deobaloda
- Interactive map of Durg district
- Country: India
- State: Chhattisgarh
- Division: Durg
- Headquarters: Durg
- Tehsils: 3

Government
  - Lok Sabha constituencies: 1

Area
  - Total: 2,238 km^{2} (864 sq mi)

Population (2011)
  - Total: 1,721,948
  - Density: 769.4/km^{2} (1,993/sq mi)
- Time zone: UTC+05:30 (IST)
- Major highways: NH6
- Website: durg.gov.in

Durg district is a district situated in Chhattisgarh, India. The district headquarters is Durg. The district covers an area of 2,238 km^{2}. As of 2011 it is the second-most populous district of Chhattisgarh (out of 18), after Raipur.

The district is home to two important religious sites. The principal Hindu temple, the Ganga Maiyaat Jhalmala, Jain shrine of Uwasaggaharam Parshwa Teerth at Nagpura (near Durg), attract pilgrims from all over India. The Langurveer Mandir is one and only Hindu Temple Devoted to God Langoorveer in India situated in Durg.

The town of Bhilai is home to the Bhilai Steel Plant.

The present District Magistrate and Collector of Durg is Shri Abhijeet Singh (I.A.S.).

== Geography ==
Durg is surrounded by the following districts:

1. Bemetara to the north

2. Balod to the south.

3. Raipur to the east.

4. Dhamtari to the south east

5. Rajnandgaon to the west.

=== Municipal corporation ===
- Durg Municipal Corporation
- Bhilai Municipal Corporation
- Bhilai Charoda Municipal Corporation
- Risali Municipal Corporation

=== Municipal council ===
- Jamul
- Ahiwara
- Kumhari

=== Nagar panchayat ===
- Patan
- Dhamdha
- Utai

=== Cities in Durg ===
- Durg
- Bhilai

=== Towns in Durg ===
- Ahiwara
- Anda
- Dhamdha
- Jamul
- Kumhari
- Mahamaya
- Patan
- Utai

== Demographics ==
Religions in Durg district (2011)
Religion	Percent
Hinduism	91.41%
Islam	4.02%
Sikhism	1.26%
Christianity	1.25%
Buddhism	0.91%
Jainism	0.72%
Other or not stated	0.43%
Distribution of religions

According to the 2011 census, Durg district has a population of 3,343,872, roughly equal to the nation of Uruguay or the US state of Connecticut. This gives it a ranking of 100th in India (out of a total of 640). The district has a population density of 319 inhabitants per square kilometre (830/sq mi). Its population growth rate over the decade 2001-2011 was 18.95%. Durg has a sex ratio of 988 females for every 1,000 males, and a literacy rate of 79.69%. After bifurcation, the district had a population of 1,721,948, of which 1,104,700 (64.15%) live in urban areas. Scheduled Castes and Scheduled Tribes made up 14.26% and 5.88% of the population respectively.

=== Languages ===
Languages of Durg district (2011)
1. Chhattisgarhi (58.9%)
2. Hindi (25.0%)
3. Telugu (2.82%)
4. Odia (2.68%)
5. Marathi (2.24%)
6. Bhojpuri (2.08%)
7. Bengali (1.29%)
8. Punjabi (1.25%)
9. Others (3.73%)

At the time of the 2011 Census of India, 58.89% of the population in the district spoke Chhattisgarhi, 25.02% Hindi, 2.82% Telugu, 2.68% Odia, 2.24% Marathi, 2.08% Bhojpuri, 1.29% Bengali and 1.25% Punjabi as their first language.

Vernaculars spoken include Chhattisgarhi and written in the Devanagari script.
