= Patan, Chhattisgarh =

Patan
- Town
- Location in Chhattisgarh, India Patan (India)
- Coordinates: 21.03°N 81.53°E
- Country: India
- State: Chhattisgarh
- District: Durg
- Elevation: 280 m (920 ft)

Population (2001)
  - Total: 8,698

Languages
  - Official: Hindi, Chhattisgarhi
- Time zone: UTC+5:30 (IST)
- Postal code: 491111
- Vehicle registration: CG

Patan is a town and a nagar panchayat in Durg district in the Indian state of Chhattisgarh.

== Geography ==
Patan is located at 21.03°N 81.53°E. It has an average elevation of 280 metres (918 feet).

== Demographics ==
As of 2001 India census, Patan had a population of 8,698. Males constitute 51% of the population and females 49%. Patan has an average literacy rate of 68%, higher than the national average of 59.5%: male literacy is 77%, and female literacy is 59%. In Patan, 14% of the population is under 6 years of age.

== History ==
Patan was a hotbed of Indian freedom struggle. Sri M. P Sawarni, Lakhan Lal Kashyap, Uday Ram Verma, Uday Ram Dikoria and many others from this region were involved in freedom struggle against the British Raj.

== Education ==
Patan High School was built sometime around 1953.
