= Bhilai Charoda =

Old Bhilai Bhilai-3/Charoda
- city
- Location in Chhattisgarh, India Old Bhilai (India)
- Coordinates: 21.21979°N 81.45751°E
- Country: India
- State: Chhattisgarh
- District: Durg

Government
  - Type: Municipal Corporation
  - Body: Charoda Municipal Corporation

Area
  - Total: 190 km^{2} (73 sq mi)

Population (2011)
  - Total: 107,170
  - Density: 560/km^{2} (1,500/sq mi)
- Demonym: Bhilites

Languages
  - Official: Hindi, Chhattisgarhi
- Time zone: UTC+5:30 (IST)
- PIN: 490025
- Telephone code: 0788
- Vehicle registration: CG-07

Bhilai Charoda is a municipal corporation and a part of Bhilai city in the state of Chhattisgarh, India. Charoda is an industrial area of Bhilai city. Asia's longest railway marshaling yard is in Charoda, Bhilai.

== Demographics ==
As of 2001 India census Charoda had a population of 98,008. Males constitute 52% of the population and females 48%. Charoda has an average literacy rate of 77.63%, higher than the national average of 74.04%; with male literacy of 87.19% and female literacy of 67.96%. 13% of the population is under 6 years of age. The sex ratio of Bhilai Charoda is 995. Thus per every 1000 men, there were 995 females in Bhilai Charoda. Additionally, the child sex ratio was 1,034 which is greater than the average sex ratio (989) of Chhattisgarh. Bhilai Charoda is situated equidistant, 20 kilometers, from Durg and Raipur (the state capital).

== Places of interest ==
Deobaloda temple

Deobaloda has a temple of the Hindu god Shiva called Mahadev temple, built by the Kalachuris during the 13th century.

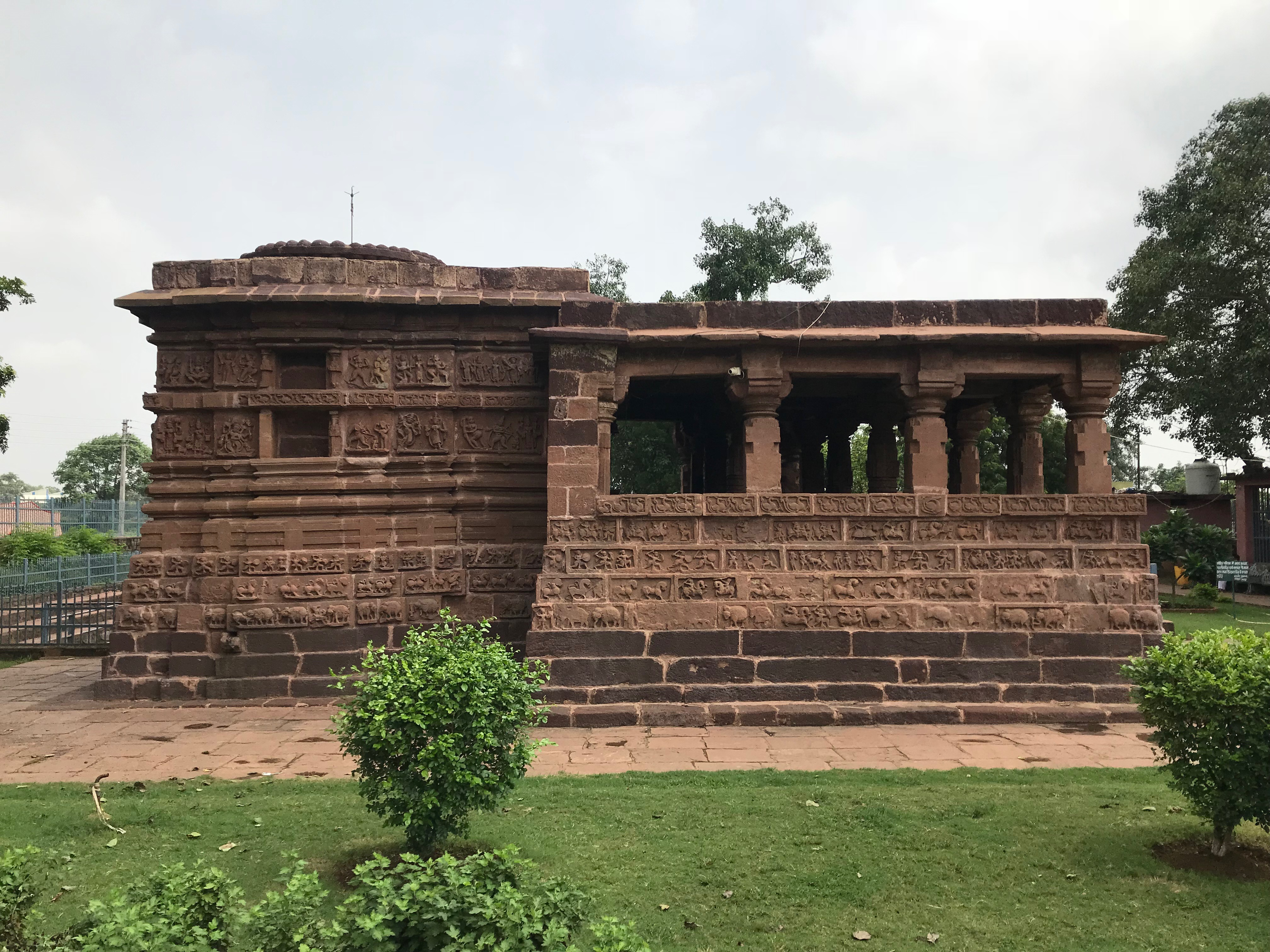
Mahadev Temple, Deobaloda built by the Kalchuris during the 13th Century
