= Khairagarh (city) =

- town
- Location in Chhattisgarh, India Khairagarh (India)
- Coordinates: 21.42°N 80.97°E
- Country: India
- State: Chhattisgarh
- District: Khairagarh-Chhuikhadan

Government
  - Type: Federal democracy
- Elevation: 307 m (1,007 ft)

Population (2011)
  - Total: 17,094

Languages
  - Official: Hindi, Chhattisgarhi
- Time zone: UTC+5:30 (IST)
- PIN: 491881
- Vehicle registration: CG 08

Khairagarh is a city in Khairagarh-Chhuikhadan-Gandai district, in the Indian state of Chhattisgarh. Formerly, it was the part of Rajnandgaon district.

== History ==
Khairagarh State was a feudatory state of the former Central Provinces of British India. Pandadah (8 kilometer from Khairagarh) is one of the most historical places in Chhattisgarh. The chief, who was descended From the old Nagvanshi Rajputs royal family, received the title of Raja, The King, as a hereditary distinction in 1898. The state included a fertile plain, yielding rice.

== Geography ==
Khairagarh is located at 21.42°N 80.97°E. It has an average elevation of 307 metres (1007 feet).

=== Climate ===
This part of India has a hot summer between mid-April to mid-June. Besides these two months, the climate is generally pleasant. Khairagarh receives an average rainfall of around 900 millimeters per year. In winters, the minimum temperature falls to 7-9 °C.

One may enjoy monsoon, autumn, winter, and spring at one place.

== Demographics ==
As of 2001 India census, Khairagarh had a population of 15,149. Males constitute 51% of the population and females 49%. Khairagarh has an average literacy rate of 73%, higher than the national average of 59.5%: male literacy is 81%, and female literacy is 64%. In Khairagarh, 13% of the population is under 6 years of age. Majority of population are the Lodhi rajputs along with few other castes and tribes. Thus it is the only area in Chhattisgarh which can said to be the "Garh of Lodhis".

== Education ==
=== Indira Performing Art and Music University ===
The Indira Performing Art and Music University (Indira Kala Sangeet Vishw vidyalaya) is Asia's first university dedicated to visual and performing arts.

Indira Kala-Sangeet Vishwvidyalaya was established under the Act XIX of 1956 of the Government of Madhya Pradesh. After the creation of the new state of Chhattisgarh in 2001, the Governor of Chhattisgarh is the Chancellor and Administrative Academic Head of I. K. S. V. V. Khairagarh.

In 1956, the then-rulers of princely state of Khairagarh donated their palace to open a University of Music and Fine Arts. The late Raja Birendra Bahadur Singh, and the late Rani Padmavati Devi, named this university after their beloved daughter ‘Indira’.

To join and study at the Indira Kala Sangeet Vishwavidyalaya is a way to enjoy Indian art forms. The university offers a long list of subjects and courses related to diverse art forms like classical vocal music (Hindustani and Carnatic), classical instrumental music (Hindustani and Carnatic), classical dance styles (Kathak and Bharatanatyam), folk dance and music, painting, sculpture, graphics, history of Indian art and culture, and various literatures. The university is involved in teaching and research in Indian performing and visual art forms. The university has forty-five affiliated colleges, one affiliated research center and a good number of recognized examination centers throughout India. The university is one of a kind in India as it provides degree for different forms of classical dance and music. The rest of the universities provide with diploma courses for the same.

== Transport ==
The three nearby railway stations, Rajnandgaon, Dongargarh, and Durg, are 40, 42 and 55 kilometres away from Khairagarh respectively. Direct trains for Vishakhapatnam, Mumbai, Pune, Ahmedabad, Howrah, Bhubaneswar, Chennai, Trivandrum, Amritsar and New Delhi are available from these railway stations, situated on the main train route of Howrah-Mumbai via Nagpur. The state capital Raipur is a three-hour journey from Khairagarh University. Raipur and Nagpur airports are at a distance of 100 and 225 kilometres, respectively.
