= Jamul, Durg =

Jamul
- Town
- Location in Chhattisgarh, India Jamul (India)
- Coordinates: 21.25°N 81.4°E
- Country: India
- State: Chhattisgarh
- District: Durg
- Elevation: 297 m (974 ft)

Population (2001)
  - Total: 21,633

Languages
  - Official: Hindi, Chhattisgarhi
- Time zone: UTC+5:30 (IST)
- Vehicle registration: CG

Jamul is a town and a nagar palika in Durg district in the Indian state of Chhattisgarh.

== Geography ==
Jamul is located at 21.25°N 81.4°E. It has an average elevation of 297 metres (974 feet).

== Demographics ==
As of 2001 India census, Jamul had a population of 21,633. Males constitute 52% of the population and females 48%. Jamul has an average literacy rate of 69%, higher than the national average of 59.5%: male literacy is 78%, and female literacy is 59%. In Jamul, 14% of the population is under 6 years of age.
