= Sakri River (Chhattisgarh) =

Coordinates: 25°06′N 85°37′E

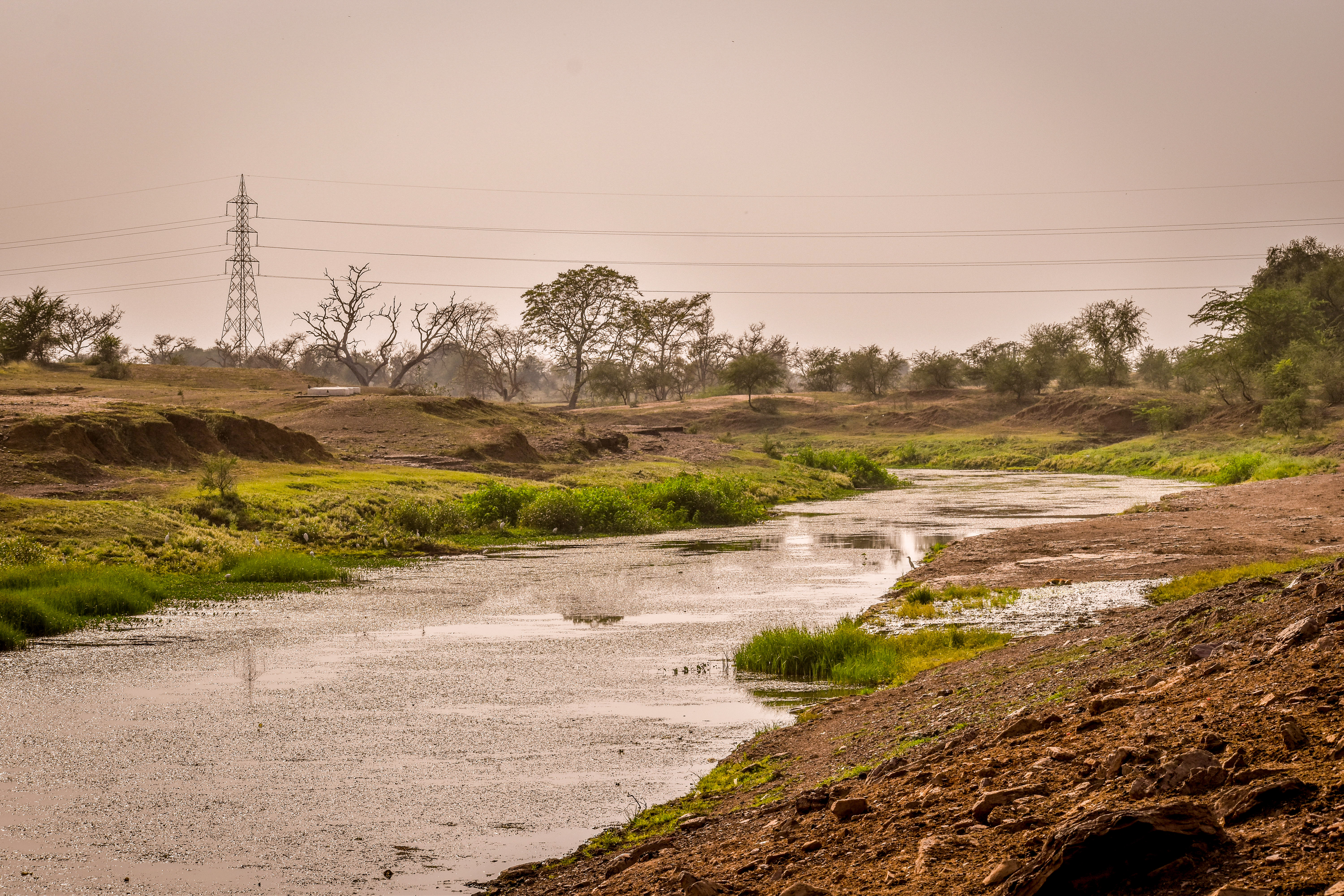
Sakri River, Chhattisgarh

Map of District

Sakri River is a tributary of Shivnath River of Chhattisgarh. The elevation of the river is at 2850 feet (ridge area) and the lowest is at 1200 feet (lowlands). The total length of the river is 90 km, the first village from the origin is Kariyama, district Kabirdham and it merges with the Half river in Darhi village, another tributary of Shivnath river in Bemetara district. Bhoramdeo Temple and Kawardha are the two major sites along the banks of the river.

== River course ==
The Sakri river rises from the Maikal Hills and joins the Half River at the distant Darhi village. After leaving the north-west of the district, the Sakri rivers flow towards the south-east and finally fall into the Shivnath river in the Durg district.

== Flood ==
In 1998, heavy rains caused floods and the settlements of villages near Kawardha were melted by water passing through the river, which was later displaced in the center of Kawardha town named Ganganagar.

== Documentary Film ==
Bolti Nadi - Into the Sakri River Basin is a 2019 documentary film by Amir Hashmi, which has done a detailed research on water label, animal, agricultural impact and historical aspects as well as sampling all the contact villages located on the river. This film has been made by walking about 90 km from Kariyama, the first village of the origin of the river Sakri, from district Kawardha to the river's immersion site, village Darhi, district Bemetara, The Sakri river merges with the Half river in village Darhi.
