= 2021 Kawardha riots =

Civil unrest in Kawardha, Chhattisgarh

2021 Kawardha riots and unrest
- Part of religious violence in India
- Date: 3 October 2021; 5 years ago
- Location: Kawardha, Chhattisgarh; 22.02°N 81.25°E
- Goals: Arson, stoning, civil unrest and rioting
- Result: Police flag march; Re-opening of the region

Parties
Authority	Protestors
Chhattisgarh state	BJP
Chhattisgarh Police	Bajrang Dal
CRPF	VHP

Lead figures
Ramesh Sharma (IAS)	Abhishek Singh	Sandip Garg (IPS)

Incidents of religious violence between Hindus and Muslims occurred in Kawardha, Chhattisgarh, India, between 3 and 7 October 2021.

== Background ==
Kawardha is a small city in the Kabirdham district of Chhattisgarh state. It is the home of former state Chief Minister Raman Singh and Forest Minister Mohammad Akbar. The district has population of 92.4% Hindus and 7.76% Muslims.

== Incident ==
On Sunday, 3 October 2021, a group of Muslims and Hindus had an argument over the placement of religious flags in Loahara Naka Chowk in the town of Kawardha. An eyewitness claimed that following the altercation, a green flag had been torn down, and some hours later, a saffron flag was removed in retaliation. Two days later, right-wing organisations, including the Vishva Hindu Parishad and the Bajrang Dal, held a rally protesting the flag removal. The rally led to civil unrest in the region, including arson and rioting. The police conducted a lathi charge to disperse the protestors, invoked Section 144 (barring unlawful assembly) of the Indian Penal Code, and imposed a curfew in the region.

The police stated that the Vishva Hindu Parishad and the Bajrang Dal had promised peaceful protests. They registered a First Information Reports against several people, including Santosh Pandey, a Member of Parliament, and Abhishek Singh, a former Member of Parliament, both of whom were from the Bharatiya Janata Party. BJP leader Pandey claimed that the police has been acting along with the Indian National Congress's government in the Chhatishgarh and hence only BJP leaders are targeted.
