= Pandatarai =

- town
- Location in Chhattisgarh, India Pandatarai (India)
- Coordinates: 22.188359°N 81.326122°E
- Country: India
- State: Chhattisgarh
- District: Kabirdham

Government
  - Type: Town Board
  - Body: The Chairman With Ward Members

Area
  - Total: 9 km^{2} (3.5 sq mi)
- Elevation: 360 m (1,180 ft)

Population (2011)
  - Total: 7,004
  - Density: 780/km^{2} (2,000/sq mi)

Languages
  - Official: Hindi, Chhattisgarhi
- Time zone: UTC+5:30 (IST)
- PIN: 491559
- Telephone code: 07754
- Vehicle registration: C.G. 09

Pandatarai is a town & (since 2008) nagar panchayat in the Kabirdham (formerly Kawardha) district of Chhattisgarh, India. This is a religious and tourist site. In Pandatarai temple of Maa Mahamaya (durga) and a historical temple of lord Shivajaleshwar mahadev dongariya is near about Pandatarai and dargahe auliya sher shah vali are most popular places. Dongariya mahadev is also a popular destination Pandatarai Pin code is 491559 and postal head office is Pandaria .

Pandatarai is surrounded by Bodla Tehsil towards the west, Kabirdham Tehsil towards the south, Kawardha Tehsil towards the south, and Lormi Tehsil towards the East.

Pandariya, Mungeli, Bemetra, and khairaagadh are the nearby cities to Pandatarai. Kawardha and Bilaspur are the nearest famous city. Pandatarai is famous for its quality school education

== Transportation to Pandatarai ==
=== By Rail ===
There is no railway station near to Pandatarai in less than 10 km. However Bilaspur Jn Railway Station is major railway station 98 km far but nearest to Pandatarai.

=== By Air ===
There is no Airport near to Pandatarai. However Bilaspur, Raipur which are 95 km and 150 km respectively from Pandatarai are the nearest airport from here.

=== By Bus or Vehicle ===
It is on National Highway 130A (the Kawardha-Bilaspur road). Buses are easily available from all the major cities of Chhattisgarh like Bilaspur, Raipur, Kawardha, Durg, Rajnandgaon etc.

== Education ==
=== Colleges near Pandatarai ===
Govt. College Pandatarai

Address : Near by Charbhata Khurd, NH 130A, Pandatarai, 491559

=== Schools in Pandatarai ===
Govt Hr. Sec. School Pandatarai Address : Pandatarai, Chhattisgarh . PIN- 491559,

Bhoramdev Public School Address : Near Sub-Station Pandatarai Chhattishgarh

Saraswati Shishu Mandir Pandatarai Address : Behind Mahamaya Mandir, Chhattisgarh . PIN- 491559,

Jai Bharat Public School Pandatarai Address : Madmada Road Pandatarai, Chhattisgarh . PIN- 491559,

Divine Public School Address : Behind Nagar Panchayat Pandatarai, Chhattisgarh . PIN- 491559,

Saraswati gyan Mandir, Pandatarai Address : Mahamaya chouk, Main Road, Pandaatrai, Chhattisgarh . PIN- 491559,
