= Kawardha Assembly constituency =

Legislative Assembly constituency in Chhattisgarh State, India

Coordinates: 22.01°N 81.24°E

Kawardha
- Constituency No. 72 for the Chhattisgarh Legislative Assembly

Constituency details
- Country: India
- Region: Central India
- State: Chhattisgarh
- District: Kabirdham
- Lok Sabha constituency: Rajnandgaon
- Established: 1951
- Total electors: 331,671
- Reservation: None

Member of Legislative Assembly
- 6th Chhattisgarh Legislative Assembly
- Incumbent Vijay Sharma
- Party: Bharatiya Janata Party
- Elected year: 2023
- Preceded by: Mohammad Akbar

Kawardha is one of the 90 Legislative Assembly constituencies of Chhattisgarh state in India. It is in Kabirdham district and is a segment of Rajnandgaon Lok Sabha seat. The seat used to be part of Madhya Pradesh Legislative Assembly when Chhattisgarh was part of MP.

== Members of Assembly ==
Year	Member	Party
Madhya Pradesh Legislative Assembly
1952	Gangaprasad	Ram Rajya Parishad
1957	Dharamraj Singh	Ram Rajya Parishad
1962	Vishwaraj Pratap Singh	Ram Rajya Parishad
1967	T. V. Singh	Independent
1972	Kumar Yashwant Raj Singh	Independent
1977	Rani Shashi Prabha Devi	Ram Rajya Parishad
1980	Hamidullah Khan	Independent
1985	Rani Shashi Prabha Devi	Indian National Congress
1990	Raman Singh	Bharatiya Janata Party
1993	Raman Singh	Bharatiya Janata Party
1998	Yogeshwar Raj Singh	Indian National Congress
Chhattisgarh Legislative Assembly
2003	Yogeshwar Raj Singh	Indian National Congress
2008	Siyaram Sahu	Bharatiya Janata Party
2013	Ashok Sahu	Bharatiya Janata Party
2018	Mohammad Akbar	Indian National Congress
2023	Vijay Sharma	Bharatiya Janata Party

== Election results ==
=== 2023 ===
2023 Chhattisgarh Legislative Assembly election: Kawardha
Party	Candidate	Votes	%	±%
BJP	Vijay Sharma	144,257	53.22	+21.22
INC	Mohammad Akbar	104,665	38.62	−18.01
AAP	Khadgraj Singh	6,334	2.34	
NOTA	None of the Above	925	0.34	−0.05
Majority		39,592	14.60	−10.03
Turnout		271,047	81.72	−0.78
BJP gain from INC		Swing		

=== 2018 ===
Chhattisgarh Legislative Assembly Election, 2018: Kawardha
Party	Candidate	Votes	%	±%
INC	Mohammad Akbar	136,320	56.63	
BJP	Ashok Sahu	77,036	32.00	
Independent	Ramkhilawan Dahariya	6,604	2.74	
JCC	Agam Das Anant	6,250	2.60	New
Independent	Ram Kumar Sahu	2,947	1.22	
NOTA	None of the Above	949	0.39	
Majority		59,284	24.63	
Turnout		240,739	82.50	
INC gain from BJP		Swing		

=== 2013 ===
- Ashok Sahu (BJP) : 93,645 votes
- Akbar Bhai (INC) : 91,087

=== 2003 ===
- Yogeshwar Raj Singh (INC) : 51,092 votes
- Dr. Siyaram Sahu (BJP) : 46,904

=== 1998 ===
- Yogeshwar Raj Singh (INC) : 52,950 votes
- Dr. Raman Singh (BJP) : 37,524

=== 1962 ===
- Vishwaraj Singh (RRP) : 16,660 votes
- Shyamprasad Awasthi (INC) : 6,536

== See also ==
- Kabirdham district
- List of constituencies of Chhattisgarh Legislative Assembly
