= Utkala kingdom =

Ancient kingdom in Odisha, India

Utkala kingdom (Sanskrit: उत्कल, was located in the northern and eastern portion of the modern-day Indian state of Odisha. This kingdom was mentioned in the epic Mahabharata, with the names Utkala, Utpala, and Okkal. It is mentioned in India's national anthem, Jana Gana Mana.

== Early Sanskrit Literature ==
The early Sanskrit medieval literature says "उत्कृष्ट कलायाः देशः यः सः उत्कलः" (utkṛṣṭa kalāyāḥ deśaḥ yaḥ saḥ utkalaḥ), meaning the land having an "excellent opulence of artists". The Puranic division of Utkala desa was bounded on the north by the river Kapisa, on the south by the river Mahanadi, on the east by the Bay of Bengal and to the west by Mekala hills.

== Mahabharata ==
The Dasarnas, the Mekalas (a kingdom to the west of Utkala) and the Utkalas were mentioned as kingdoms of Bharata Varsha (Ancient India) (6:9). Utkalas were mentioned as taking part in the Kurukshetra War siding with the Kauravas. Many Mekalas, Utkalas, Kalingas, Nishadas, and Tamraliptakas, advanced against Nakula, showering their shafts and lances, desirous of slaying him (8:22).

The Utpalas, the Mekalas, the Paundras, the Kalingas, the Nishadas, the Trigartas, and the Valhikas, were all vanquished by Karna (7:4).

== See also ==
- Kingdoms of Ancient India
