= Ramehpur =

Village in Chhattisgarh, India

Ramehpur is a village near Kawardha in Kabirdham district of Chhattisgarh state of India.
