= Yogeshwar Raj Singh =

Indian politician

Yogeshwar Raj Singh (born 1967) is a scion of Kawardha Raj family. They are related to the Royal family of Raj Gond Thakur (Naagvanshi) dynasty. Son of late HH Maharaj Vishwaraj Pratap Singh.

He did his schooling from Rajkumar College, Raipur. He married 19 February 2003, Rani Kriti Devi belonging to erstwhile Tripura State. The couple have a son born in 2004. He is a former Indian National Congress politician. He represented Kawardha Vidhan Sabha constituency of undivided Madhya Pradesh Legislative Assembly by winning General election in years 1998 and later as part of Chhattisgarh in 2003. He resigned from Indian National Congress membership in 2013, after being neglected for several years by the party.

He has turned the Kawardha Palace built by his grandfather Dharamraj Singh in 1935–39 into a luxury heritage hotel.

He now holds the title-in-pretence of the Raja of Kawardha.
