= Vishwaraj Pratap Singh =

Titular Ruler and Indian politician

Raja Vishwaraj Pratap Singh
- Raja (Hereditary)

Titular Raja of Kawardha State
- Reign: 1959 – 1971
- Successor: Raja Yogeshwar Raj Singh
- Born: 18 October 1932; Kawardha
- Died: 14 May 2007 (aged 74)
- Spouse: Shashi Prabha Devi
- Issue: Yogeshwar Raj Singh
- House: Kawardha

Raja Vishwaraj Pratap Singh (18 October 1932 – 14 May 2007) was the titular Raja of Kawardha State from 1959 to 1971. He was a member of the Legislative Assembly of Madhya Pradesh from Kawardha constituency as a member of Akhil Bharatiya Ram Rajya Parishad from 1962 to 1967.

== Early life ==
Singh was born in Kawardha on 18 October 1932 to Raja Dharamraj Singh. He belonged to Hindu Kshatriya Raj Gond Family Claiming Descendant of Rani Durgavati. He was educated at Rajkumar College, Raipur where he served on the executive committee in later life. He married Rani Shahiprabha Devi daughter of Raja Ganga Pratap Singh of Mallapur, Uttar Pradesh.

== Career ==
He became the Raja of Kawardha upon the death of his father on 20 August 1959 and held the title until the privy purse and titles were abolished by the Government of India in 1971.

== Personal life ==
He died on 14 May 2007.

He is survived by two daughters and a son. His elder daughter Manjari Kumari married Kunwar Rudra Dev Singh of Orchha, the second, Vasundhara Kumari, married Rawal Sanjai Singh, the titular Rawal of Bissau. His son Yogeshwar Raj Singh, now holds the title-in-pretence of the Raja of Kawardha.
