= Panduvamshis of Mekala =

6th–7th century Indian dynasty

Find spots of the inscriptions of the Panduvamshis of Mekala

The Panduvamshis (IAST: Pāṇḍuvaṁśī) or Pandavas (IAST: Pāṇḍava) were an Indian dynasty that ruled the historical Mekala region in present-day Chhattisgarh state of India, during the 6th and the 7th centuries. The Panduvamshi kings, who were Shaivites, claimed descent from the legendary Pandavas and also claimed to be members of the lunar dynasty. They may have been Gupta feudatories, and may have been related to the Panduvamshis of Dakshina Kosala, but this cannot be said with certainty.

== Period ==
The dynasty's inscriptions are dated in the regnal years of the kings, instead of a calendar era. Therefore, various historians have determined the dynasty's period of reign based on other evidence.

A stanza in the Bamhani inscription of the Panduvamshis contains the word "narendra", which has been interpreted as a veiled reference to the Vakataka king Narendrasena by some scholars. Based on this inscription, epigraphist Bahadur Chand Chhabra theorized that Narendrasena was the overlord of the Panduvamshi king Bharatabala. This theory is corroborated by the fact that the inscriptions of Narendrasena's son Prithvisena II state that his father's commands were obeyed by the lords of Kosala, Mekala and Malava. According to Chhabhra, the inscription does not allude to Narendrasena's overlordship in "equivocal terms", because Bharatabala's acknowledgement of Narendrasena's suzerainty was nominal, and Mekala was practically an autonomous state. Based on Narendrasena's date, Chhabra dated the ascension of the first Panduvamshi king Jayabala to c. 400 CE. According to this theory, the Panduvamshis ruled during the 5th century. Historian Ajay Mitra Shastri disputes Chhabra's theory, stating that the word "narendra" (literally "king") in the dynasty's inscriptions refers to the Panduvamshi king Shurabala alias Udirnavaira, not the Vakataka king Narendrasena. Shastri points out that the Bamhani inscription was issued by Udirnavaira, not Bharatabala; the inscription mentions that feudal chiefs fell at the feet of Udirnavaira, which suggests that Udirnavaira considered himself a paramount ruler.

According to the Bamhani inscription, Bharatabala's queen Lokaprakasha came from the Amaraja kula (family) of Kosala. Earlier scholars variously identified this family as Panduvamshis of Kosala, Sharabhapuriyas and Shuras, all of which ruled the Dakshina Kosala region. However, these identifications are no longer considered tenable after the discovery of an inscription of a ruler named Vyaghraraja. The Malhar inscription of Vyaghraraja describes him as a member of the Amararya kula, which seems to be same as the Amaraja kula.

Based on the epigraphic evidence, the inscriptions of the Panduvamshis of Mekala cannot be dated earlier than the late 6th or early 7th century. Shastri places Jayabala to c. 500-525 CE. He theorizes that Jayabala and his son Vatsaraja acknowledged Gupta suzerainty, and Vatsaraja's son Nagabala asserted sovereignty after the decline of the Guptas.

== Territory ==
The Panduvamshis ruled the historical Mekala region, which covered the area around the Maikal Hills, whose name derives from the word Mekala. The core Panduvamshi territory included parts of the present-day Mandla, Shahdol, and Bilaspur districts.

The location of the dynasty's capital is not certain, as its inscriptions do not mention the place of their issue. Historian V. V. Mirashi theorized that it was located at present-day Bandhavgarh. Mirashi connected the Panduvamshis to an earlier dynasty whose inscriptions have been found at Bandhavgarh. These inscriptions mention Mahasenapati (military general) Bhadrabāla and his son Vaishravana, whom Mirashi speculated to be the ancestors of Jayabala. However, Mirashi's theory is based on incorrect reading of the name "Bhadrabāla" as "Bhadrabala". Moreover, there is strong evidence to connect the Bandhavgarh chiefs with the Magha kings, who formed a distinct dynasty. Therefore, Mirashi's conjecture is not tenable. Historian K. D. Bajpai believed that the capital was located at present-day Malhar, which according to Bajpai, was known as Sharabhapura in the ancient period. However, there is no concrete evidence to support this theory either.

== Political history ==
The early rulers of Mekala may have been feudatories of the Guptas or the Vakatakas. The Puranas state that seven kings ruled Mekala for seventy years; this may be a reference to the Panduvamshis of Mekala.

The dynasty's inscriptions state that its founder Jayabala was born in the lineage of the Pandavas, and also describe the family as somasya vamsha. Like the Panduvamshis of Dakshina Kosala, the Panduvamshis of Mekala were known as both "Pandava" and "Soma-vamsha" (lunar dynasty). He bore the titles rājan ("king") and kṣitipati-tilaka ("foremost among the ruling chiefs").

Jayabala's son and successor Vatsaraja bore the titles kṣitiśa and nṛpati ("king"). The Bamhani inscription describes him as Vatseshvara (lord of Vatsa); this seems to be a comparison to the famous Vatsa king Udayana, who was also said to be a descendant of the Pandavas. The inscription contains vague references to Vatsaraja's military victories. For example, it states that he "assailed the enemies by the valour of his own arms and made the gardens attached to the houses of his enemies teem with wild beasts".

The next ruler Nagabala was a son of Vatsaraja and Drona-bhattarika. According to the Panduvamshi inscriptions, he bore the title Maharaja, which suggests that he was more powerful than his predecessors: it is possible that the preceding kings were feudatories, and Nagabala attained a sovereign status. The Bamhani inscription describes him as a Shaivite who was devoted to the brahmanas, gurus, various gods, and the supreme divinity. It also contains vague references to his military exploits, describing the movements of his horses and elephants.

Bharatabala, Nagabala's son from Indra-bhattarika, also bore the title Maharaja. He was also known as Indra, and the dynasty's inscriptions compare him to the deity Indra in the destruction of his enemies, and to the deity Agni (fire) in brilliance. His birth from Indra-bhattarika is compared to the birth of Shiva's son Kartikeya from Parvati. The Malhar inscription equates him to the legendary emperor Bharata. These descriptions suggest that he achieved significant military successes against his enemies. Like his father, the Bamhani inscription describes him as a Shaivite devoted to brahamanas etc., and vaguely refers to his military exploits. The inscription states that he received gifts of gold during ritual sacrifices. It names his queen as Lokaprakasha (although, according to one interpretation, this is not a name, but a descriptive word, meaning "world-renowned".) It describes the queen as amaraja-kulaja, which has been variously interpreted as "born in a divine family" or "born in the Amaraja family". The queen was born in Kosala, which can be identified as Dakshina Kosala in this context. It compares the queen to the sacred river Jahanvi (that is, Ganges), and states that she became world-renowned by performing religious duties and because of her sons and grandsons.

Bharatabala was succeeded by Shurabala alias Udirnavaira, his son from queen Mahadevi. Shurabala's Malhar inscription describes him as a Shaivite devoted to brahamanas etc., like his predecessors. His inscriptions state that he "uprooted his enemies", and several feudal chiefs subjugated by him fervently rubbed his "lotus-like feet".

=== Decline ===
An inscription issued by the samanta (feudatory ruler) Indraraja has been discovered at Malga in Chhattisgarh. Although the inscription does not name Indraraja's overlord, it is similar to the Bamhani and Malhar inscriptions issued by Udirnavaira, in terms of content, script, language, and style. It was inscribed by Dronaka, and the inscriptions of Udirnavaira were inscribed by Mihiraka; both Dronaka and Mihiraka were sons of the goldsmith Ishvara. These evidences suggest that Indraraja was related to Udirnavaira, although the nature of this relationship is not certain. Indraraja's title (samanta) suggests that he owed allegiance to the Panduvamshis, but the omission of the overlord's name in the inscription suggests that he had become somewhat independent. Historian Ajay Mitra Shastri speculates that he flourished in a period when the Panduvamshi power was declining after the end of Udirnavaira's reign, but he had not become strong enough to completely renounce the Panduvamshi suzerainty.

== Possible successors ==
The Panduvamshis of Dakshina Kosala, a later dynasty, rose to power in an area adjacent to Mekala around Udirnavaira's time. Its kings also claimed descent from the legendary Pandavas, and claimed to belonged to the lunar race. It appears that this new dynasty was related to the Panduvamshis of Mekala, but there is no concrete evidence to establish this with certainty.

The two dynasties were different in several ways. Only one king of the Dakshina Kosala dynasty is known to have a name ending in "-bala", while all but one kings of the Mekala dynasty had names ending in -"bala". The copper-plate inscriptions of the Dakshina Kosala dynasty are composed in prose, and are inscribed in "box-headed" characters (although some private stone inscriptions from their reign are inscribed in "nail-headed characters"). On the other hand, the inscriptions of the Mekala dynasty are composed in a mixture of prose and verse, and are inscribed in "nail-headed" characters. The Dakshina Kosala rulers prefixed the word "mahat" to their names, which was not a practice among the Mekala rulers. Lastly, the Dakshina Kosala rulers were Vaishnavites, unlike the Mekala rulers, who were Shaivites.

Some of these differences are explainable. For example, the use of the "box-headed" characters and the "mahat" prefix can be attributed to the influence of the Sharabhapuriyas, who preceded the Panduvamshis in the Dakshina Kosala region. It can be argued that the later Panduvamshis adopted Vaishnavism. However, the inscriptions of the Dakshina Kosala kings do not mention the Mekala rulers, although they contain a detailed description of their dynasty. The Dakshina Kosala family may have been a collateral branch of the Mekala family, but this cannot be said with certainty in absence of concrete historical evidence.

== Rulers ==
The known rulers of the dynasty, with estimates of their reign by historian A. M. Shastri, are as follows:

- Jayabala, c. 500-525
- Vatsārāja; queen Drona-bhattarika
- Nāgabala; queen Indra-bhattarika
- Bharatabala alias Indra; queen Lokaprakasha
- Shurabala alias Udirnavaira (IAST: Śūrabala Udīrṇavaira), c. 600-?

== Inscriptions ==
The following inscriptions issued during the reign of the Panduvamshis of Mekala, all in Sanskrit language, have been discovered.

Find spot	Type	Issuer	Regnal year	Notes and source
Bamhani	copper-plates	Shurabala Udirnavaira	2	Records Udirnavaira's grant of Varddhamanaka village to the brahamana Lohitasarasvamin, who belonged to the Vatsa gotra and the Madhyandina Shakha of the Shukla Yajurveda. The village was located in the Panchagartta Vishaya (district) of the Uttara-rashtra (northern province) of Mekala.
Burhikhar, Malhar (Mallar)	copper-plates	Shurabala Udirnavaira	8	Records Udirnavaira's grant of Sangama village to Narasimha, a son of Bota and a grandson of the merchant (vanik) Manoratha. With the king's permission, Narasimha donated the village to the shrine of Jayeshvara-bhattaraka, a form of the god Shiva. The village was located in the Dakshina-rashtra (southern province) of the Mekala kingdom, and is identified with the modern Tala village in Bilaspur district.
Malga	copper-plates	Samanta Indraraja	?	Records Indraraja grant of the Sala-grama-mantamaraka village to the brahmana Bhavasvamin, who belonged to the Shandilya gotra and the Vajasaneya-Madhyandina Shakha of Yajurveda. The village was located in Gula-gramaka in Akasha-rashtra of the Chenda-paranga vishaya (district). Although Indraraja The inscription was found in the possession of a resident of the Dhobahar village in Bilaspur district, and is said to have been originally owned by a resident of the Malga village.
