= Bhoramdeo Temple =

Shiva temple in Chhattisgarh, India

Bhoramdev Temple
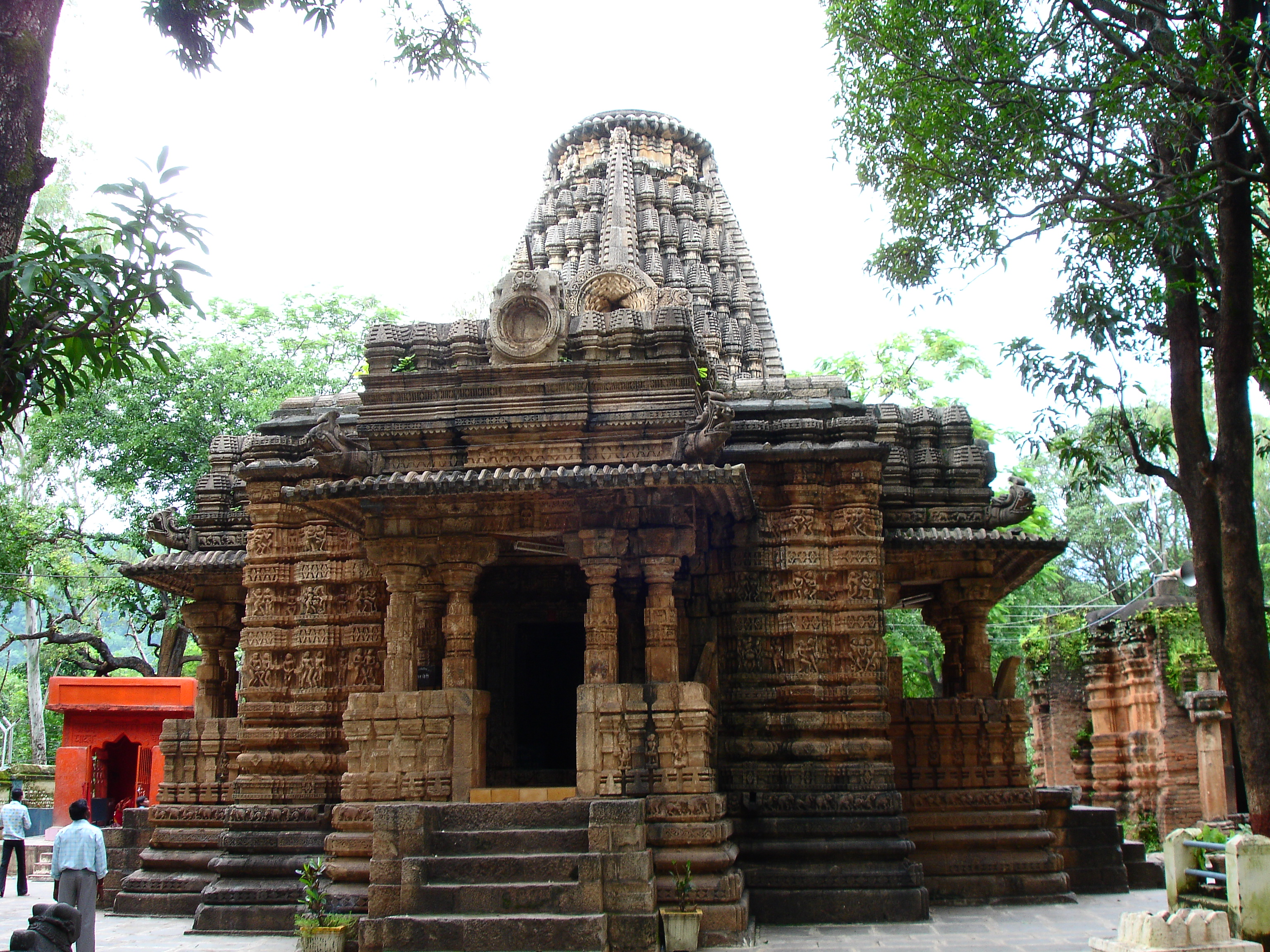
- Bhoramdev Temple

- Location in Chhattisgarh

Religion
- Affiliation: Hinduism
- District: Kabirdham district
- Deity: Shiva

Location
- Location: Chaura village, Kawardha town.
- State: Chhattisgarh
- Country: India
- Coordinates: 22°6′57.6″N 81°8′52.8″E

Architecture
- Type: Nagara
- Completed: 1089 AD
- Temple: 3

Bhoramdeo Temple is a Hindu temple dedicated to the god Shiva in Bhoramdeo, in the Indian state of Chhattisgarh. It comprises a group of four temples of which the earliest is a brick-temple. The main temple is the Bhoramdeo temple built in stone. The architectural features with erotic sculptures has given a distinct style akin to the Khajuraho temple and the Konark Sun Temple in Odisha, and hence the Bhoramdeo complex is known by the sobriquet the "Khajuraho of Chhattisgarh".

Another temple within a distance of about 1 kilometre (0.62 mi) from Bhoramdeo, which is mentioned along with the Bhoramdeo complex is the Madwa Mahal, meaning marriage hall in local dialect, also known as Dullhadeo. It was built in 1349 during the reign of Ramchandra Deo of the Naga dynasty of Kawardha and has a unique Shiva Linga erected over 16 pillars.

== Location ==
The Bhoramdeao temple complex is built at the foot of the thickly forested scenic backdrop of the Maikal range of hills, in the Daksina Kosala region, which is in the present day Indian state of Chhattisgarh. It is situated 18 km to the North-West of the tehsil town of Kawardha in Kabirdham district.

The nearest airport to the Bhoramdeo complex is 134 km away near Raipur, which is the capital of Chhattisgarh and Raipur is well connected with the many major cities of the country. Raipur is also the nearest railhead Bombay-Howarah main line. Road communications from Kawardha, the nearest tehsil town to the temple complex, exists to Raipur (116 km), Rajnandgaon (133 km) and Jabalpur (220 km).

There is also a bypass road from Raipur to Madhya Pradesh Highway which skirts the Kanha National Park.

== History ==
The temple complex, rich in history and archeological details, is dated to the Kalachuri period (10th-12th centuries, one ruling over areas in Central India in east Madhya Pradesh, Rajasthan and were called Chedi or Haihaya (Heyheya) (northern branch)) with close identity with the sculptures found in nearby archeological sites such as Janjgir, Kalachuri, Narayanpur and Ratanpur sites. The brick temples were built during the rule of Pandus and are similar to those built in Kharod, Palari, Rajim and Sirpur in the state.

The Temple was built by Laxman Dev Rai & Gopal Dev of Faninagvansh Dynasty.The temple complex, highlighted as a "scintillating poetry in stone", is credited to Naga kings of Chakrakota who practiced tantrism and who ruled in the then Southern Koshal region, which is now the state of Chhattisgarh. Its construction is dated between the 7th and 12th centuries. As the Gond Tribals of the area worshiped Lord Shiva whom they called Bhoramdeo, the temple was also named Bhoramdeo with the Shiva Linga in it.

== Layout ==
The single lane approach road winds into the temple complex, where a sculpted figure of Nandi (the bull), the mount of Shiva, is installed and a colourful arch greets visitors. From this entrance is a well laid out esplanade which leads to the temple complex. The esplanade is laid like an avenue planted with Giant bamboo (Dendrocalamus), sal (Shorea robusta), and Arjun trees (Terminalia arjuna) on both sides. It terminates in a man made lake with the Maikal Mountains forming its backdrop. There are Gulmohar trees (Delonix regia) spreading its branches with profusion of flowers in orange-red hue. Boats, which ply in the lake, are moored to a jetty, and a fountain at the center of the lake spreads jets of water. The temple complex is situated on the banks of this lake.

=== Bhoramdeo temple ===
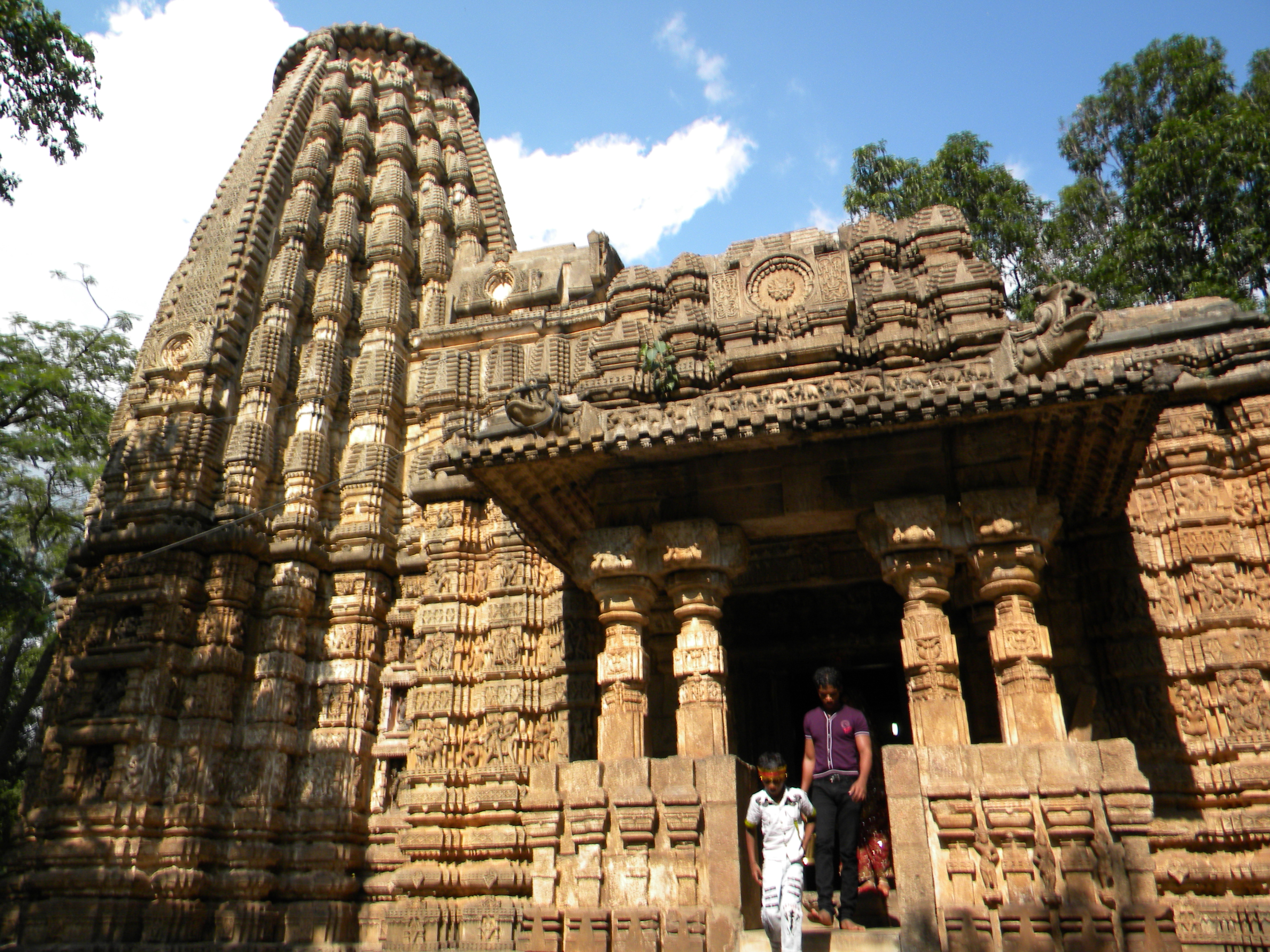
Main tower with the open "half shelters" in the front facing south

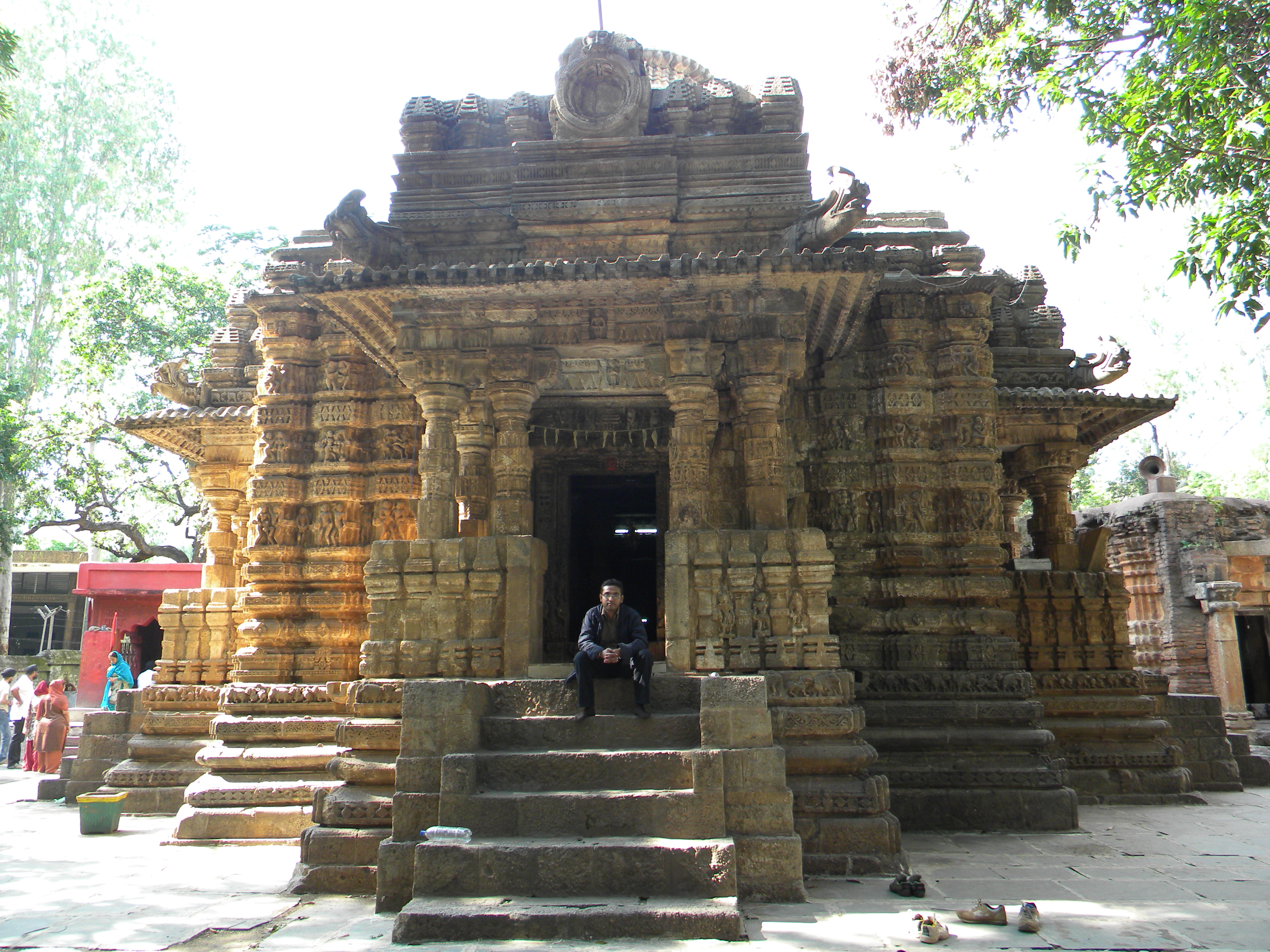
Main entrance to the Bhoramdeo Temple with the Ishtaliq or brick built ruined temple to its left and a small red painted shrine dedicated to Hanuman on the right

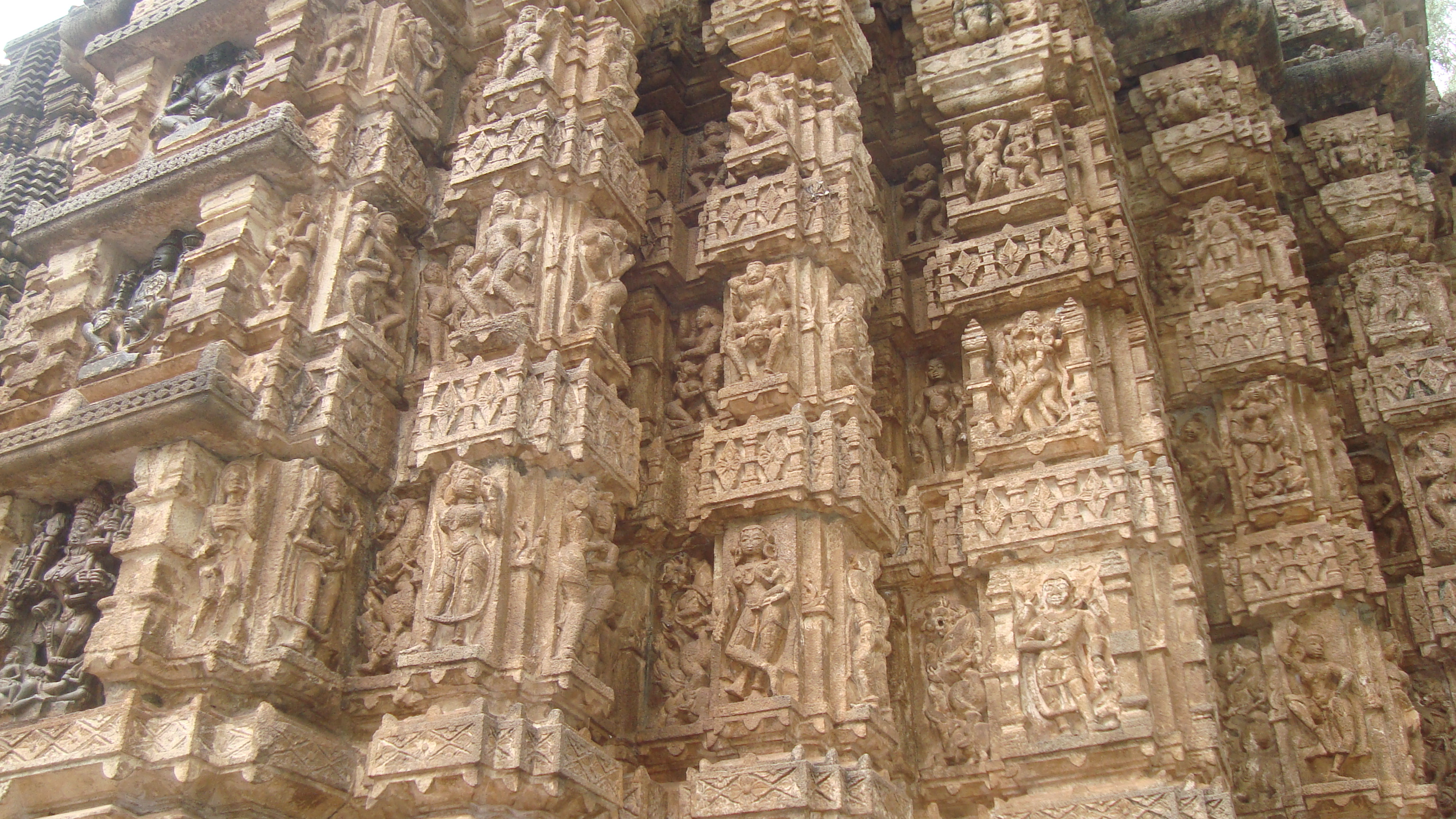
A freeze of an external face of the temple with images of gods and erotic sculptures from Kama Sutra

Bhoramdeo temple, built of stone, and dated to the 11th century, which is older than the Khajuraho Group of temples is considered an "outstanding structure". It has profusion of carved images on its exterior walls. Its architectural style is known as the Gurur type, unlike the north Indian Nagara style of architecture. Its structural uniqueness lies in the receding rows or tiers placed successively upwards in the top part of the temple tower.

The first stage of the temple is a large platform or plinth that is built to height of 5 feet (1.5 m). The platform itself, on its exterior faces, has many sculptures of Hindu deities carved on it.

The temple built over this platform which measures 60 feet (18 m) x 40 feet (12 m) has the conventional Hindu temple composition of a mandapa (hall), followed by an antral or passage leading to the Garbhagriha or sanctum sanctorum, the main enclosure in the temple where the chief deity, Shiva in form of a Shiva Linga, is deified. The mandapa is square on plan and is supported on four main central pillars, apart from the peripheral pillars. The sanctum sanctorum measures 9 feet (2.7 m)x9 feet (2.7 m). All the three enclosures are linked by passageways.

The temple is built facing the eastern direction, where there is an entry door; in addition, there are two more doors which open to the south and north but there is no door in the westerly direction. The three doors have open "half shelters".

Right at the entrance to the sanctum sanctorum, there are very finely sculpted images of the ten avatars of the god Vishnu, apart from images of Shiva and Ganesha. The towering roof of this garbhagriha is topped by Kalasha, which is circular in shape. The garbhagriha has striking right angled offsets in the north east and southern part which add to the elegance of the temple. There are many small towers which surround the main tower.

The front entrance door of the temple has sculpted images of Ganga and Yamuna on its doorpost.

Also sculpted on the exterior and interior walls of the temple are the bass reliefs in the entablature part, of elephants, mythical figures and sensuous sculptures; the sensuous figures on the exterior walls represent the Kama Sutra, the erotic postures which reflects the then prevailing social, cultural, architectural and religious ethos in the region. These sculptures are crafted in three tiers on the exterior face of the temple up to the pinnacle, and are housed in niches. The sculpted images arranged in rows on the outer faces of the main tower vary in size from 1 foot to 1.5 ft to 2 ft in descending order from the top of the tower to its lower end. The main tower expands lower down into four other subsidiary structures to provide stability to the main tower.

The lowest tier of the exterior walls is embellished with sculptures of lions and elephants. The material used for the sculptures are of black and ochre stones (black stone is used to carve pantheon gods while Ochre stone is used for other sculptures). Also sculptured on the exterior face of the temple are divine images of Vishnu and his incarnations. In addition, the entrance doors are flanked by images of mythological figures, which are of 1 or 2 ft in height. On the southern face of the shikara or tower there is well crafted image of Ganesha with six arms and well turned out trunk. Some of the other images of interest are: A stone slab of Vishnu and Lakshmî mounted on Garuda with a king offering prayers, a gana adorning the top part of the pillars; inside the sanctum sanctorum, next to the main deity of Shiva Linga, is serpent with raised hood, and also images of Ganesha and Shiva, and that of a king and queen.

Typical architectural feature which represents the Khajuraho style of architecture is the tower of the temple which is a synthesis of a view of the receding Maikal Hill range. The sharp curved forms, typical of temples of Orissa. are also a built-in feature of this temple.

=== Istaliq temple ===
The Istaliq temple or the temple built with dried or burnt clay bricks adjoins the main Bhoramdeo temple. It was the first temple built between 2nd and 3rd centuries. This temple, in a dilapidated condition. It has only a sanctum sanctorum without an entrance hall or mantap. The tower above the sanctum sanctorum is extant only to half its height. There is wall projecting out of this temple which is known as "Allinda". Other existing structural features seen in the sanctum sanctorum are a few sculpted pillars. A sculpted Shiva Linga is deified here along with images of Uma Maheswar and of the king and queen standing in a worshipful pose.

=== Open-air museum ===
There is an open-air museum within the temple complex which has a large collection of archeological antiquaries unearthed from the area, which are dated to 2nd and 3rd centuries. A particular find on display is of Sati pillars, which have unique architectural motif in which couples are carved in squatting amorous postures called the "alingana-mudra". There are also many slabs (stelles), with one stele in particular carved with a sword as a commemorative slab, and images of Uma Maheswar. Other collections on display in the courtyard are: Many dilapidated images; friezes of Nandi and Linga; and on the northern part of the courtyard a temple made of bricks in a ruined state. A recently built temple washed in red colour with the deity Hanuman, is also seen on one side of the courtyard. A draped Kal Bhairava sculpture is also seen in the complex at its exit end.

=== Chherki Mahal ===
Cherki Mahal, North-east View Local lore dictates that this temple was built by a Naga chief in the 14th century and could possibly be affiliated to Siva. However, one can assume the shrine was built for the shepherd (Cherki) communities of the region by the ruler to consolidate his legitimacy in a region dominated by grazers. In local dialect the word 'cherki' means shepherd, hence the shrine owes its nomenclature to the shepherd community who would bring their cattle to the monument for shelter and shade. This is a popular belief among the villagers. Architecture The Cherki mahal is an east facing brick and stone structure with no ornamentation on its outside. On plan, it consists of a garbhagrha (sanctum). Perhaps, the original structure had an ardhamandpa (entry hall) or a mandapa (hall). It rises into a tall pyramidal superstructure (shikhara) with crude outward projections along its vertical lengths on all four sides resembling an early latina (spire) style. Its corner spires are horizontally layered. The temple certainly falls under the early Nagara (North Indian) idiom.

=== Madwa Mahal ===
Madwa Mahal, located about a kilometer away from the main temple, is a west facing temple where a Shiva Linga is deified. As the temple was built like a marriage hall or pandal (fabricated structure), known in local dialect as "Madwa". It was built in remembrance of the wedding of Nagwanshi king Ramachandra Dev and Haihawanshi Queen Raj Kumari Ambika Devi that took place in 1349.

Entrance to the temple has traditional architectural embellishments. The ceiling of the entrance hall or mandapa had a dilapidated shikara, which has been remodeled crudely. However, the lowest part of this tower has many small erotic sculptures made by local artists. The entrance hall also has the usual feature of an image of Nandi (the bull) offering prayers to Shiva Linga, which is housed in the sanctum sanctorum. There is a stairway to approach the sanctum sanctorum from the main entrance.

The external walls of this temple have 54 images in erotic sexual postures explained in the Kama Sutra, which are said to reflect the tantric culture practiced by the Nagawanshi kings.

== Development and conservation initiatives ==
In January 2026, the Government of Chhattisgarh announced the development of the Bhoramdev Corridor under the Swadesh Darshan Scheme 2.0, with an approved outlay of ₹146 crore. The project is aimed to improve pilgrimage and heritage tourism infrastructure around the Bhoramdeo temple complex and surrounding heritage sites such as Madwa Mahal, Chherki Mahal and Ramchua.

== See also ==
- List of Hindu temples in India
- Mata Kaushalya Temple
- Bhoramdev Wildlife Sanctuary

== View Mandir ==
- "View Mandir"
