= Bhoramdev Wildlife Sanctuary =

Wildlife Sanctuary in India

- IUCN category IV (habitat/species management area)
- Location within Chhattisgarh Location within India
- Interactive map of Bhoramdev Wildlife Sanctuary
- Nearest city: Kawardha
- Coordinates: 22°6′36″N 81°8′40″E
- Area: 352 km^{2} (136 sq mi)
- Established: 2001
- Governing body: Chhattisgarh Forest Department

Bhoramdev Wildlife Sanctuary is a protected area and wildlife sanctuary located in Kabirdham district in the Indian State of Chhattisgarh. It is named after the Bhoramdeo Temple.

== Description ==
The sanctuary covers an area of approximately 352 km^{2} (136 sq mi) and was officially notified in 2001. It lies in the Maikal range of the Satpura hills and falls within the Kanha–Achanakmar tiger corridor.

== Flora and fauna ==
The sanctuary consists chiefly of tropical moist and dry deciduous forests, with key tree species such as Saaj (Terminalia tomentosa), Sal (Shorea robusta), Tendu (Diospyros melanoxylon), and Eucalyptus. Fauna includes Bengal tiger, leopard, sloth bear, sambar, gaur, wild boar, and monitor lizard. Over 100 bird species have been recorded; notable ones include Indian peafowl and Malabar pied hornbill.

== Conservation efforts ==
A draft notification in early 2025 established a 10 km Eco-Sensitive Zone around the sanctuary, with defined coordinates and zonal regulations. In February 2025, NTCA and the Union Ministry supported steps to declare it as a tiger reserve, aiming to reinforce its role in landscape-level conservation.

=== Legal and procedural developments ===
In August 2023, the Chhattisgarh High Court dismissed a PIL for immediate tiger reserve designation, noting that NTCA’s recommendation was not binding without completing required statutory processes. Earlier in 2019, NTCA’s 2014 and 2018 recommendations were overlooked by the state government despite evidence of tiger movement; this drew criticism from conservationists.
