= Saeed Ahmad Bodla =

Pakistani artist and calligrapher

- Born: 5 January 1944 (age 82); Arifwala
- Website: saeedahmadbodla.com

Saeed Ahmad Bodla (Urdu: سعید احمد بودلہ born 5 January 1944) is a Pakistani artist and calligrapher. He belongs to the Bodla family in Punjab.

== Education and work ==
He studied Fine arts from the University of the Punjab, Lahore. He has been worked on Islamic calligraphy mostly. His work also includes 99 names of Allah and surah al-muzammil. Bodla Art Gallery is named after him.

== Exhibitions ==
- Alhamra Arts Council, 2004
