= Sahaspur - Lohara =

Sahaspur Lohara
- village
- Country: India
- State: Chhattisgarh
- District: Kawardha
- Tehsil: Kawardha

Government
  - Body: Village panchayat

Population (2001)
  - Total: 5,332
- Time zone: UTC+5:30 (IST)
- Vehicle registration: CG

Sahaspur Lohara is a village and tehsil headquarter in Kawardha district, Chhattisgarh, India.

== Demographics ==
In the 2001 India census, the village of Lohara in Kawardha district had a population of 5,332, with 2,715 males (50.9%) and 2,617 females (49.1%), for a gender ratio of 964 females per thousand males.
