= Mekala =

- Geographical region
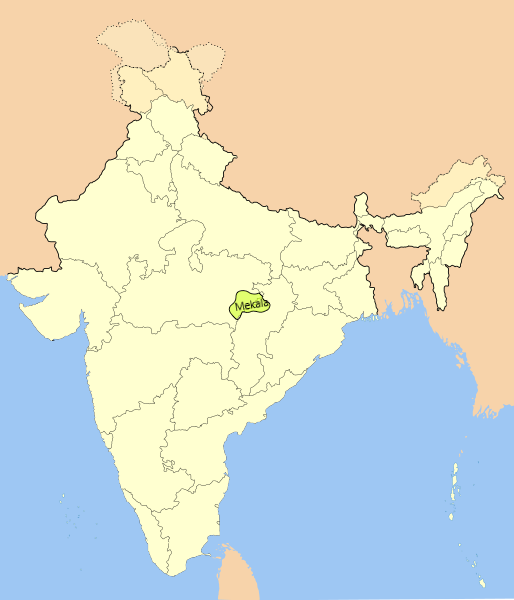
- Continent: Asia
- Countries: India
- States or Provinces: Madhya Pradesh and Chhattisgarh
- Language: Gondi language Chhattisgarhi language

Mekala is a historical region of India, extending from Amarkantak to Balaghat. It corresponds to the Maikal Hills, which comprises the present-day Kawardha District of Chhattisgarh state and Anuppur district of Madhya Pradesh. In the medieval period, the region was ruled by the Panduvamshis of Mekala.

== History ==
In the Vishnu Purana, it was mentioned that seven kings would rule over Mekala. The Pushpamitras produced thirteen kings who ruled over this tract in the 3rd century CE and the "Patumitras" succeeded them. However, H.H. Wilson in his translation of the Vishnu Purana, states that the number of Pushpamitra rulers is unknown while the Patumitras had thirteen kings.

In the 5th century CE, the Panduvamshis of Mekala rose in the region and ruled as feudatories of the Gupta Empire. The region came under the suzerainty of the Vakataka king Narendrasena and Harishena. The subsequent history of the region is not recorded, but the region probably came under the sway of the Panduvamshis of Dakshina Kosala, who were possibly related to the earlier Panduvamshis of Mekala.

The Amarkantak portion of the region passed into the hands of the Kalachuris of Tripuri. The Kalachuri king Karna commissioned the beautiful temples in Amarkantak. When the Kalachuris of Tripuri had declined, a cadet branch of their dynasty called the Haihaiyas of Ratanpur took control of the whole region. They are said to have built the actual town of Amarkantak.

In the 16th century, the portion of the Mekala located in Madhya Pradesh was conquered by the Rajgond dynasty of Garha-Mandla. Two of Garha-Mandla's capitals- Ramnagar and Mandla, were located in the Mekala region. Eventually, the Haihaiyas of Ratanpur and Garha-Mandla were invaded and annexed by the Nagpur Kingdom within the Maratha Empire. It is probably at this point that Mekala lost its identity as a separate region. The Nagpur Kingdom was forced to cede the area to the East India Company in 1818 after the Third Anglo-Maratha War. The area comprising Mekala later formed a part of the Central Provinces under British rule in India.

== Geography ==
The Mekala region is located in Central India and is mostly forested. The region corresponds to the Maikal Hills, the meeting point of the Vindhya and Satpura mountain ranges. Its core territory comprises the present-day Kawardha District of Chhattisgarh state and Anuppur district of Madhya Pradesh. According to Verrier Elwin and Shamrao Hivale, the region extended from Amarkantak to Balaghat district.

Several streams and major rivers like the Narmada and Son originate from Amarkantak located in the Maikal Hills. In the medieval period, this region was an important forest which provided elephants to the armies of kings.

== Bibliography ==
- Shastri, Ajay Mitra (1995). Inscriptions of the Śarabhapurīyas, Pāṇḍuvaṁśins, and Somavaṁśins: Introduction. Motilal Banarsidass Publ. ISBN 978-81-208-0635-1.
- Mishra, Suresh (1 January 2008). Gadha Ka Gond Rajya (in Hindi). Rajkamal Prakashan. ISBN 978-81-267-1549-7.
