= Pandariya =

Pandariya Pandaria
- town
- Location in Chhattisgarh, India Pandariya (India)
- Coordinates: 22.23°N 81.42°E
- IndiaCountry: India
- State: Chhattisgarh
- District: Kabirdham

Government
  - Body: Nagar Palika
  - MLA: Bhawna Bohra (BJP)

Area
  - Total: 12 km^{2} (4.6 sq mi)
  - Rank: 1st in area
- Elevation: 348 m (1,142 ft)

Population (2011)
  - Total: 23,175
  - Rank: 2nd in Kabirdham district
  - Density: 1,900/km^{2} (5,000/sq mi)

Languages
  - Official: Hindi, Chhattisgarhi, English language
- Time zone: UTC+5:30 (IST)
- Postal code: 491559
- Vehicle registration: CG 09

Pandariya is a town and Nagar Palika Parishad and development block in Kabirdham district in the Indian state of Chhattisgarh. This block is famous for the Dewanpatpar magnetic hill, 40 km north of Pandariya, which has an optical illusion of a gravity hill where vehicle seems to defy the gravity and roll up the hill.

== Geography ==
Pandariya is located at 22.23°N 81.42°E. It has an average elevation of 348 m (1,142 ft). It is situated at the maikal range mountains and is surrounded by lush green dense forest. A river (half nadi) is located in this city which is the lifeline for farmers of near by villages that comes under pandaria block. The town also has a number of education institutions and a government sugar factory. The place is known for its farming and sugar producing.

== Demographics ==
As of 2011 India census, Pandariya had a population of 16,165; 8,173 males and 7,992 females, giving a sex-ratio of 978. Pandariya had an average literacy rate of 70.28, whilst 16% of the population (2,577) were children 0–6.

== Gravity hill optical illusion ==
Dewanpatpar magnetic hill, sometimes also called Pandariya magnetic hill and Kawardha magnetic hill, near Dewanpatpar village on "State Highway SH5" 40 km north of Pandariya in Kabirdham district (formerly called Kawardha district) has an optical illusion of a gravity hill where vehicle seems to defy the gravity and roll up the slope. It is 70 km north of Kawardha city on SH5, 130 km northwest of Bilaspur via NH130A, 260 km northwest of Raigarh, 280 km southwest of Ambikapur city, 110 km south of Shahdol, 210 km southeast of Jabalpur, 44 km south of Gadasarai near Chhattisgarh-Madhaya Pradesh border. Another magnetic hill is 300 km away at Ulta pani at Mainpat hill station in Surguja district.
