= Dharamraj Singh =

Indian ruler and politician

Raja Dharamraj Singh
- Raja (Hereditary)

Raja Sahab of Kawardha State
- Reign: 1920 – 1948
- Predecessor: Raja Yadunath Singh
- Successor: Raja Vishwaraj Pratap Singh
- Born: 18 August 1910
- Died: 20 August 1959 (aged 49)
- Spouse: Rani Priyamwada Devi
- Issue: Raja Vishwaraj Pratap Singh; Kumar Yashwant Raj Singh
- House: Kawardha, Chhattisgarh
- Dynasty: Raj Gond
- Father: Raja Yadunath Singh
- Mother: Rani Devkumari Devi

Raja Dharamraj Singh (18 August 1910 - 20 August 1959) was the Raja of the princely state of Kawardha State from 1920 till 1948, when the Kawardha merged into Union of India. He later became active politician of Indian National Congress.He was born on 18 August 1910 at Kawardha.

== Early life ==
He succeeded his father Raja Yadunath Singh upon his death in 1920. However, he was installed as Ruler on the 15th April 1932 on attaining his age. He was educated at Rajkumar College, Raipur He married the Rani Priyamwada Devi daughter of Thakur Janardan Singh, a Raj Gond Zamindar of Birra, Maihar in Central India and has two sons.Raja Vishwaraj Pratap Singh and Kumar Yashwant Raj Singh.

== Construction of Kawardha Palace (Moti Mahal) ==
The Kawardha Palace was designed and built in the period 1936-39 by Raja Lal Dharamraj Singh, using the best Italian marble and stone, stands out in the 11 acres of lush green garden.

== Political career ==
After independence of India, he became a politician. He represented Kawardha Vidhan Sabha constituency of undivided Madhya Pradesh Legislative Assembly by winning General election of 1957 as an Indian National Congress candidate.

He died on 20 August 1959 and his eldest son Vishwaraj Pratap Singh, inherited the title of Raja of Kawardha.
