= Kawardha State =

Coordinates: 22.02°N 81.25°E

Kawardha State कावर्धा रियासत
- Princely State of British India
- 1751–1948
- Flag

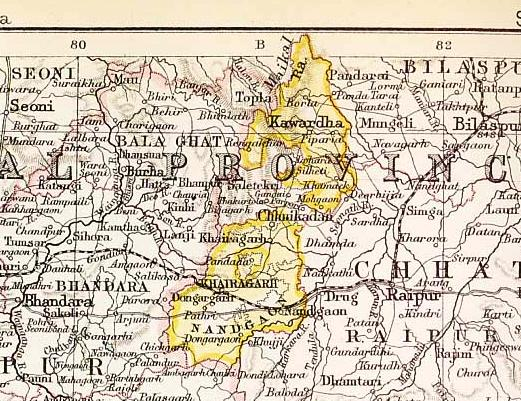
- Kawardha State in the Imperial Gazetteer of India
- Area
  - 1892: 2,067 km^{2} (798 sq mi)
- Population
  - 1892: 86,362
- History
  - Established: 1751
  - Accession to the Indian Union: 1948
Succeeded by
India

Kawardha State (Hindi: कावर्धा) was one of the princely states in the Central Provinces of India during the period of the British Raj. The capital of the state was Khairagarh town, in Kabirdham district of Chhattisgarh state. The Bhoramdeo Temple is located less than 20 km to the west of the main town.The ruling family of Kawardha is of Rajput Rajgond-Nagvanshi lineage.

== History ==
Kawardha State was founded in 1751. According to legend, its name would have originated in Kabirdham, Kabir's see, the current name of the district. In former times, many Kabir panth adherents resided in the town. The rulers were Raj Gond Nagvanshi Kshatriya dynasty.

Kawardha State's last ruler, Thakur Lal Dharamraj Singh, signed the accession to the Indian Union on 1 January 1948, so the state territory was merged into Bombay State, following its splits first assigned to Madhya Pradesh, finally to Chhattisgarh.

== Rulers ==
The rulers of the princely state of Kawardha bore the title Thakur.

- 1751 – 1801 - Thakur Mahabali Singh
- 1801 – 1848 - Thakur Ujiyar Singh
- 1848 – 1852 - Thakur Tok Singh
- 1852 – 1860 - Rani Badan Kuwar Devi
- 1860 – 1863 - Rani Dhup Kuwar Devi
- 1863 – 1864 - Thakur Bahadur Singh
- 1864 – 1891 - Thakur Rajpal Singh (b. 1849 – d.1991)
- 1891 – 1920 - Thakur Yadunath Singh (b. 1885 – d. 1920)
- 1920 – 1947 - HH Thakur Lal Dharamraj Singh (b. 1910 – d. 1959)

== See also ==
- Eastern States Agency
- Chhattisgarh Division
- Political integration of India
