= Bodla =

Bodla is a Punjabi Muslim tribe and surname, mainly found in Punjab, Pakistan. Notable people with the surname include:

- Aslam Bodla (born 1952), Pakistani politician
- Saeed Ahmad Bodla (born 1944), Pakistani artist and calligrapher

== See also ==
- Bodla, Chhattisgarh, Place in Chhattisgarh
