= Mohammad Akbar (politician) =

Indian politician

Cabinet Minister, Government of Chhattisgarh
- In office 17 December 2018 – 3 December 2023
- Governor: Anandiben Patel; Anusuiya Uikey; Biswabhusan Harichandan
- Chief Minister: Bhupesh Baghel
- Ministry and Departments: Transport.; Forest.; Housing.; Environment.; Law.
- Preceded by: Ajay Chandrakar
- Succeeded by: • Vishnu Deo Sai (Transport); • Arun Sao (Law); • Kedar Kashyap (Forest); • O. P. Choudhary (Housing, Environment)

Member of the Chhattisgarh Legislative Assembly
- In office 11 December 2018 – 3 December 2023
- Preceded by: Ashok Sahu
- Succeeded by: Vijay Sharma
- Constituency: Kawardha
- In office 2008–2013
- Preceded by: constituency stablished
- Succeeded by: Moti Ram Chandravanshi
- Constituency: Pandariya

Personal details
- Born: Madhya Pradesh (now in Chhattisgarh, India)
- Party: Indian National Congress
- Profession: Politician

Mohammad Akbar is an Indian politician of the Indian National Congress. He was a Cabinet Minister of Chhattisgarh. He was a member of the Chhattisgarh Legislative Assembly representing Kawardha.
