= Maikal Hills =

Mountain in Madhya Pradesh, India

Maikal Range
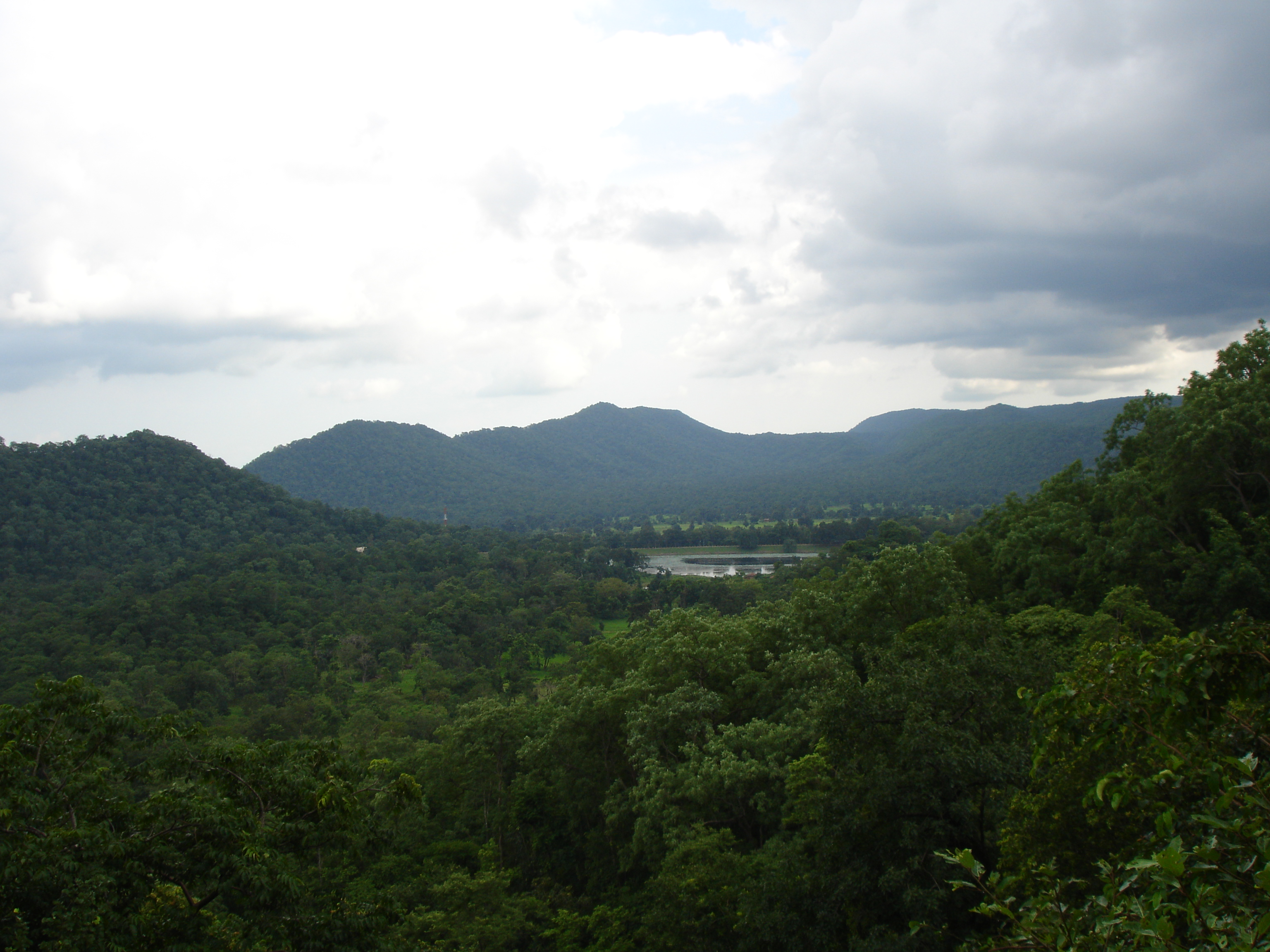
- View of the Maikal Hills in Kabirdham District

Highest point
- Elevation: 941 m (3,087 ft)

Naming
- Native name: मैकल पर्वतमाला (Hindi)

Geography
- Location within India
- Country: India
- State(s): Chhattisgarh and Madhya Pradesh
- Rivers: Narmada and Wainganga
- Range coordinates: 22°30′N 81°30′E

The Maikal Hills are range of hills in the state of eastern Madhya Pradesh and Chhattisgarh India. The Maikal Hills are an eastern part of the Satpuras in Kawardha District of Chhattisgarh and Anuppur district of Madhya Pradesh, overlooking the scenic town of Kawardha. Their altitudes range from 340 m to 942 m above sea level. This densely forested and thinly populated range gives rise to several streams and rivers including the tributaries of Narmada and Wainganga rivers. The hills are inhabited by two tribal peoples, the Baigas and the Gonds. The hill range is rich in flora and fauna wealth.

== History ==
This region was known as Mekala and was once ruled by the Panduvamshis of Mekala. Their territory included parts of the present-day Mandla, Shahdol, and Bilaspur districts.

== Culture ==
Folk songs are part of the heritage of the tribal peoples of the Maikal Hills.

== Geography ==
The Maikal are a hilly region in central India. This mountain range is one of the broad topographical divisions of Chhattisgarh. The landscape of Satpuda-Maikal extends for a distance of about five hundred kilometer. To one side of this stretch of landscape, the Achanakmar Wildlife Sanctuary of Chhattisgarh is located. On the other side of the Satpuda-Maikal lies the Melghat Tiger Reserve of Maharashtra. This stretch of land extends along with Satpuda and Maikal range in Chhattisgarh.

== Natural Reserves ==
The following protected areas are located in the range:

=== Kanha National Park ===
Kanha National Park is a national park and a Tiger Reserve in the Mandla and Balaghat districts of Madhya Pradesh and located in the Maikal hills of the Satpuras. Besides harbouring a viable population of the tiger, Kanha has distinguished itself in saving the endangered hard ground barasingha from extinction, and supporting the last world population of this deer species

=== Geology ===
The hills are known to contain bauxite, an ore for aluminium.

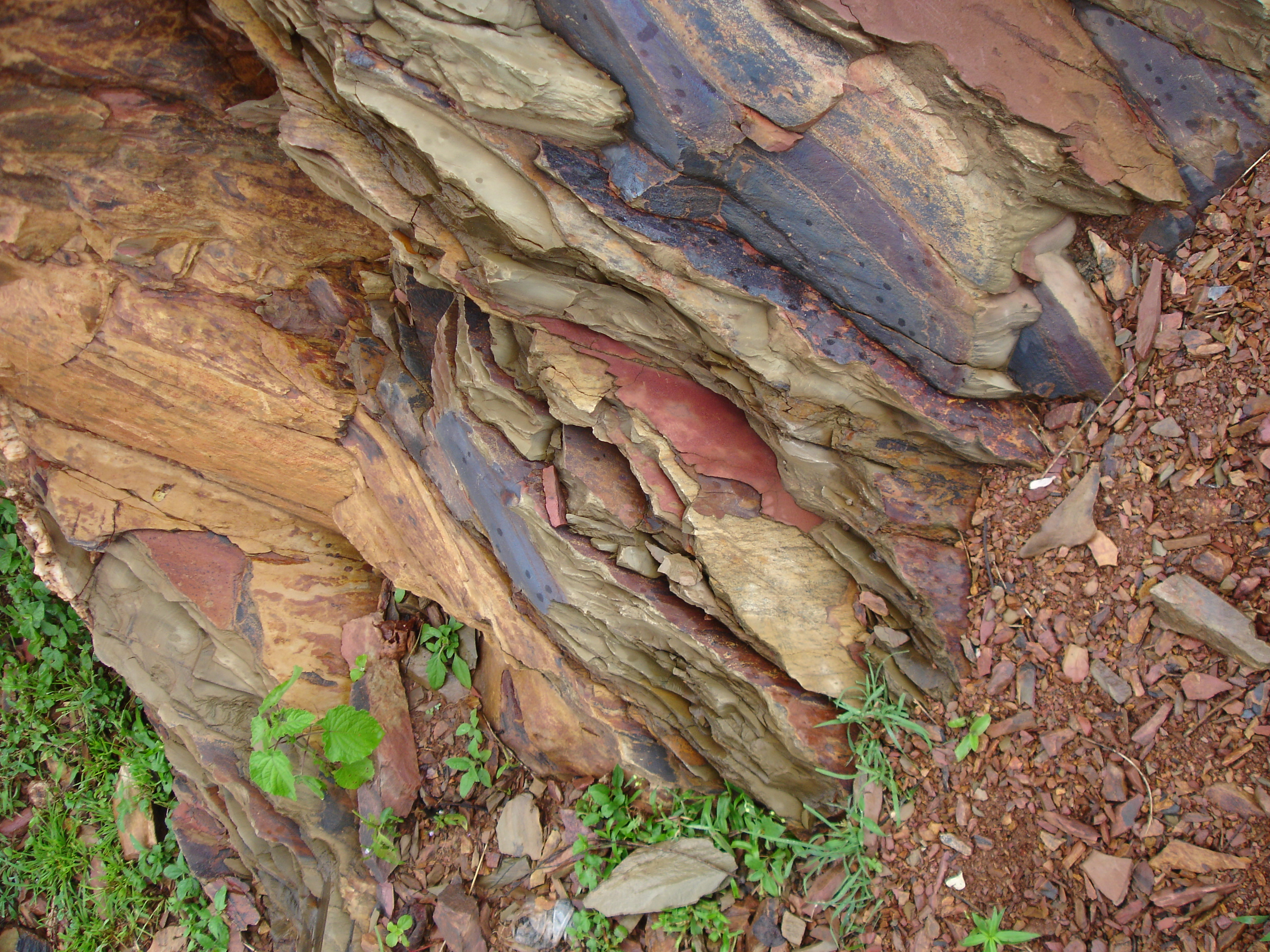
Maikal Hills ore

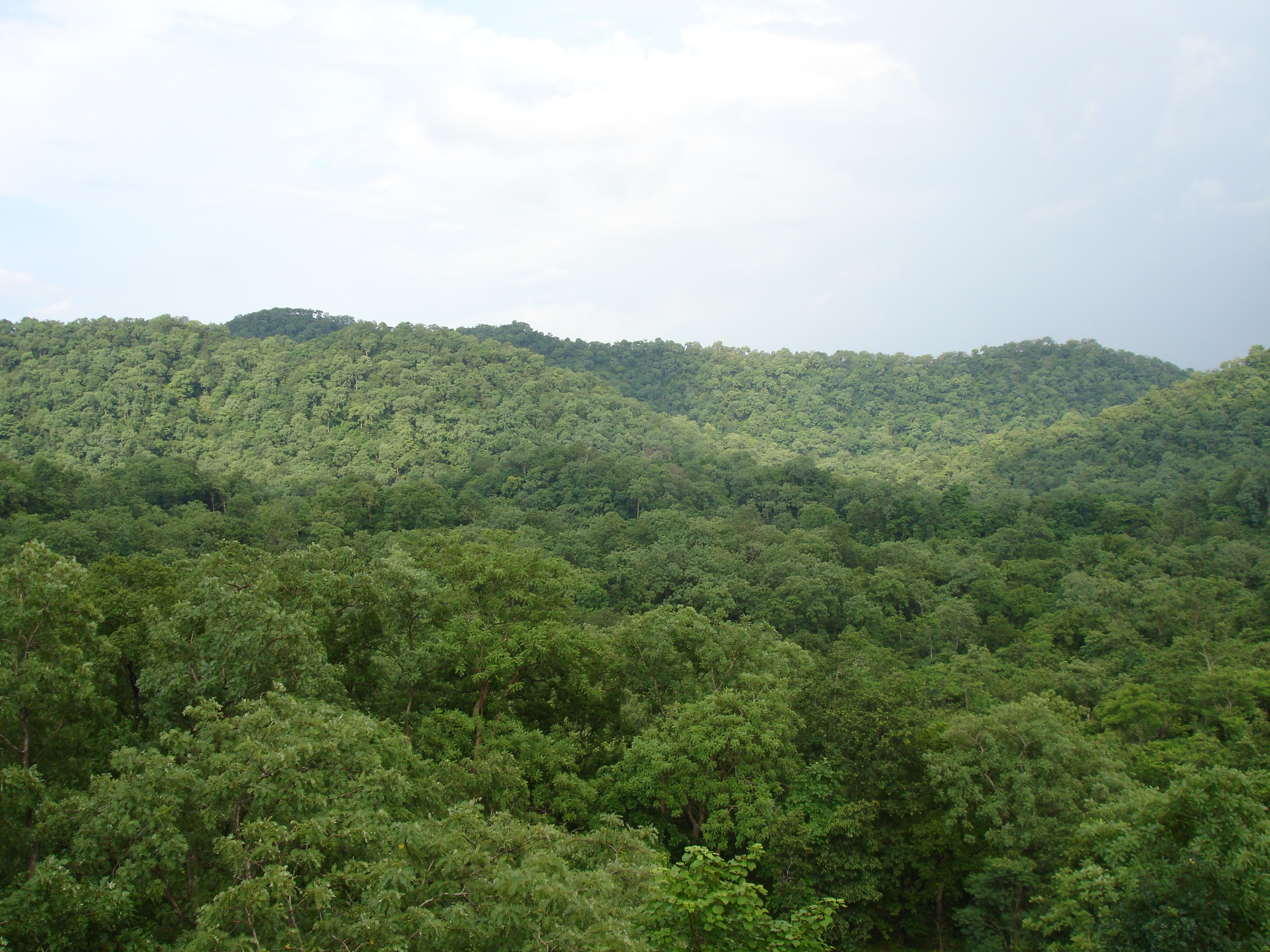
Healing Vegetation of Maikal Hills

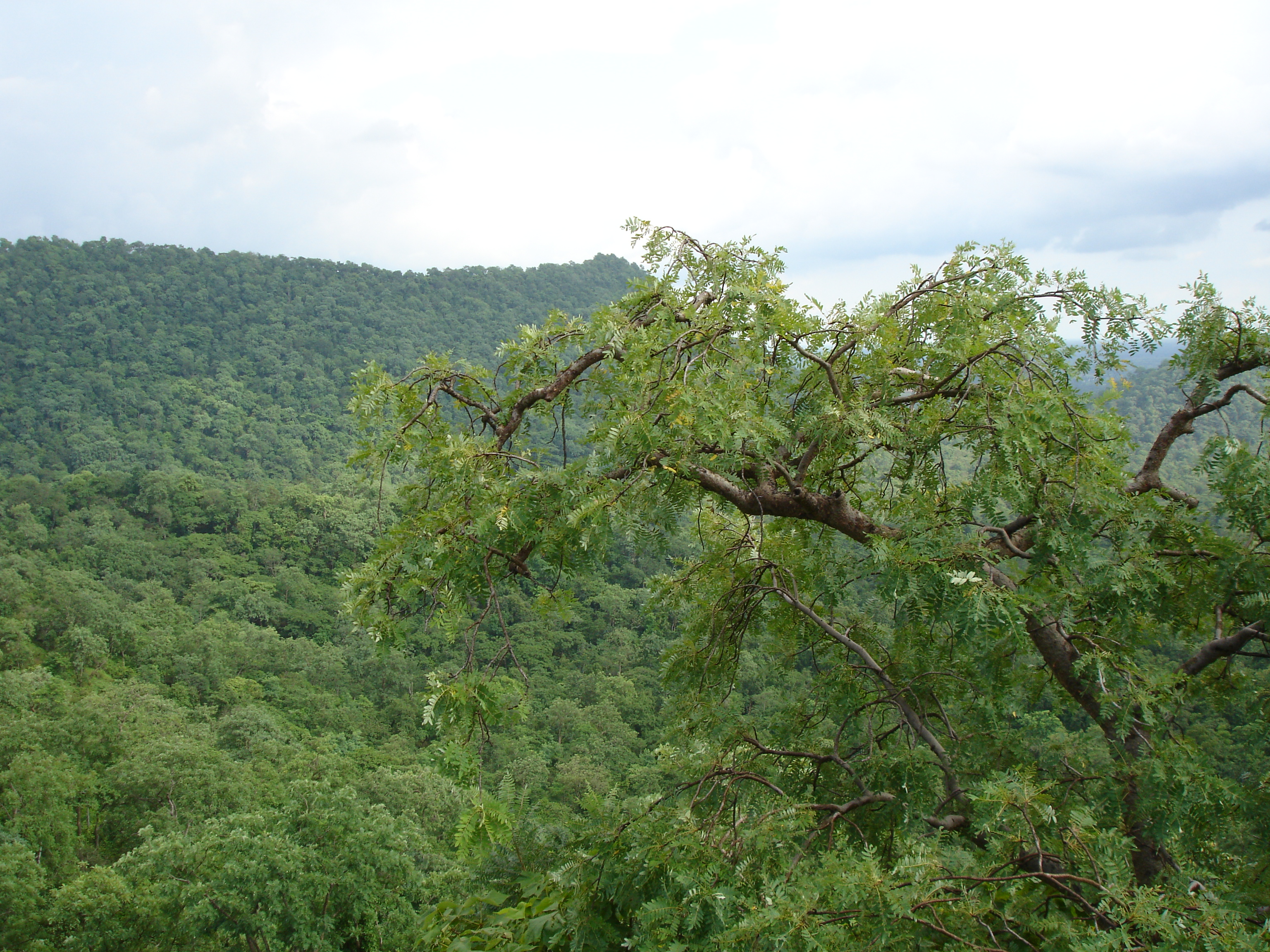
Flora of Kabirdham District

== See also ==
- Mekala
- Bhoramdev Wildlife Sanctuary
