= Kabirdham district =

Coordinates: 22°01′N 81°15′E

- District of Chhattisgarh
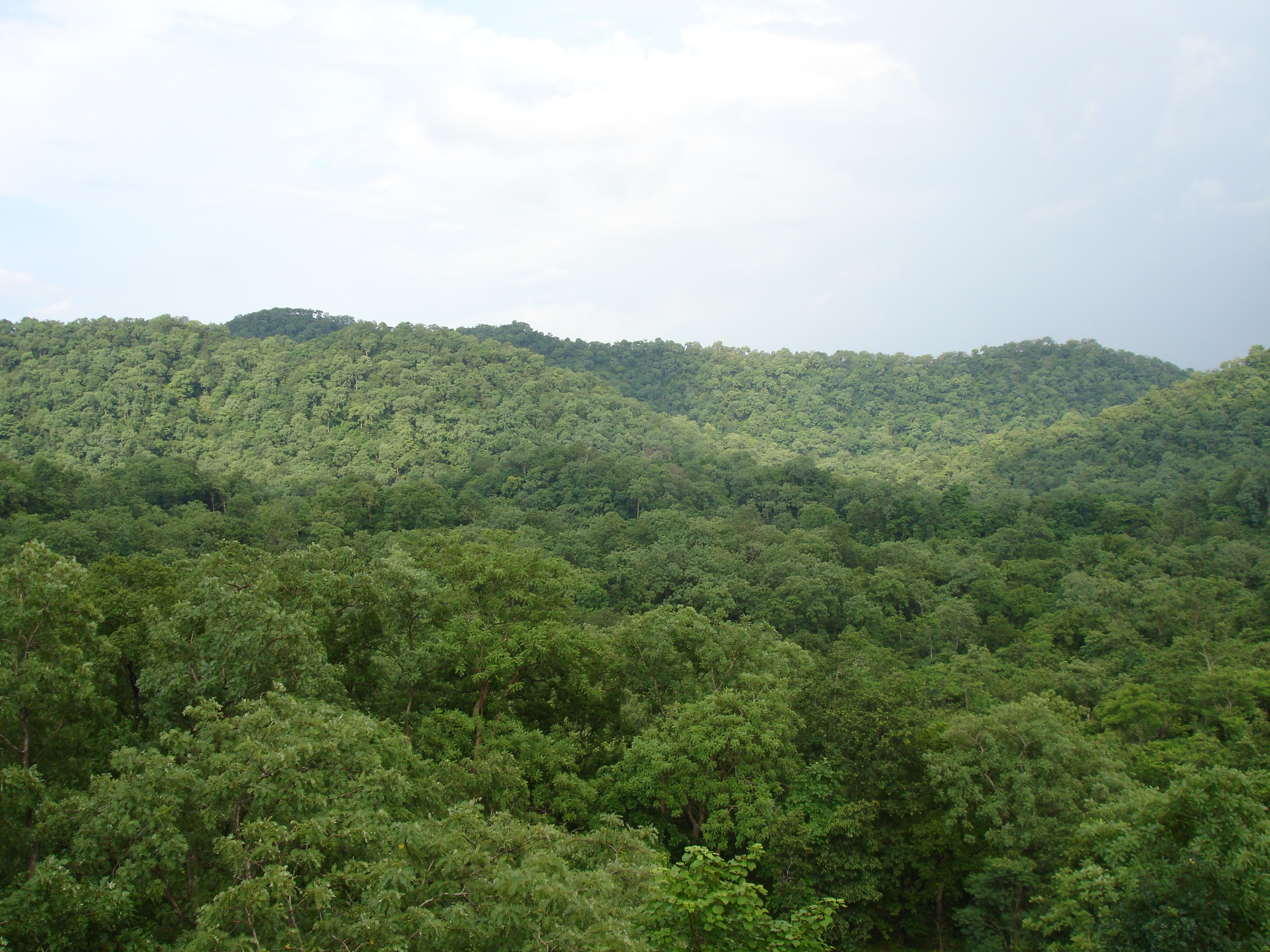
- Maikal Hills
- Interactive map of Kabirdham district
- Country: India
- State: Chhattisgarh
- Division: Durg
- Headquarters: Kawardha
- Tehsils: Kawardha Pandaria Bodala Lohara Rengakhar

Government
  - Vidhan Sabha constituencies: 2

Area
  - Total: 4,447 km^{2} (1,717 sq mi)

Population (2011)
  - Total: 822,526
  - Density: 185.0/km^{2} (479.0/sq mi)

Demographics
  - Literacy: 61.95%
  - Sex ratio: 991
- Time zone: UTC+05:30 (IST)
- PIN: 491xxx (Kabirdham)
- Major highways: NH 30 and NH 130A
- Website: kawardha.nic.in

Kabirdham district is one of the 33 administrative districts of Chhattisgarh state in central India. The district was formerly known as Kawardha district. The district is located between 21.32' to 22.28' north latitude and 80.48' to 81.48' east longitude. The district covers an area of 4,447.5 km^{2} (1,717.2 sq mi). The city of Kawardha is its administrative headquarters. This district is known for the Bhoramdeo Temple (which is also known by the sobriquet, "the Khajuraho of Chhattisgarh") located at a distance of 18 km from the district headquarters, Kawardha and its surrounding Bhoramdev Wildlife Sanctuary.

The boundaries of the district are Dindori District of Madhya Pradesh to the north, Mungeli and Bemetara districts to the east, Rajnandgaon District to the south, Balaghat and Mandla districts of Madhya Pradesh to the west. The northern and western parts are surrounded by the Maikal mountain ranges of the Satpura range.

The current district Collector is Mr Ramesh Kumar Sharma.

== History ==
On July 2, 1998 the government of Madhya Pradesh state decided to constitute a new district, Kawardha by combining the erstwhile tehsil of Kawardha of Rajnandgaon district and the erstwhile tehsil of Pandariya of Bilaspur district. The town of Kawardha was decided as the headquarters for this new district. The new district came into existence on July 6, 1998. The district is now known as Kabirdham district.

The name of the district was changed from Kawardha to Kabeerdham on 17 January 2003 by then chief minister of state Ajit Jogi on the occasion of sixth century birth celebration of Dhani Dharm Das, the founder of Kabir panth in Chhattisgarh. Kabirdham name is given due to Kawardha was Guru Gaddi Pith of kabir panth from 1806 to 1903. Eighth Guru of Kaber panth Haq Nam Saheb established Guru Gaddi here in 1806. Ninth Guru Pak Nam Saheb, Tenth Guru Prakat Nam Saheb and Eleventh Guru Dhiraj Nam Saheb resided here. Twelfth Guru Ugr Nam Saheb changed Guru Gaddi place from Kawardha to Damakheda in 1903, where Guru Gaddi is now situated.

The present day tehsil of Kawardha was a princely state, formed in the year 1751 by Mahabali Singh. In 1895, it became Kawardha tehsil of Mandla district. In 1903, it was included in Bilaspur district. In 1912, it was shifted to Raipur district and in 1948 it became a part of Durg district. On January 26, 1973 a new district, Rajnandgaon came into existence and it became a part of it.

The other tehsil Pandariya was known as Pandariya zamindari until 1952. In 1952, it became a community block of Bilaspur district and in 1986 its status was raised to a tehsil. The headquarters of Kabirdham is Kawardha. Kawardha City was established by first Jamindar of Kawardha riyasat Mahabali Singh on 1751.

== Demographics ==
Historical population
Year	Pop.	±% p.a.
1901	138,788	—
1911	164,093	+1.69%
1921	156,953	−0.44%
1931	177,872	+1.26%
1941	194,469	+0.90%
1951	208,092	+0.68%
1961	247,255	+1.74%
1971	325,139	+2.78%
1981	406,771	+2.27%
1991	513,496	+2.36%
2001	584,552	+1.30%
2011	822,526	+3.47%

Religions in Kabirdham district (2011)
Religion	Percent
Hinduism	94.35%
Other (tribal religion)	3.67%
Islam	1.49%
Other or not stated	0.49%
Distribution of religions

According to the 2011 census Kabirdham district has a population of 822,526, roughly equal to the nation of Comoros or the US state of South Dakota. This gives it a ranking of 479th in India (out of a total of 640). The district has a population density of 195 inhabitants per square kilometre (510/sq mi). Its population growth rate over the decade 2001-2011 was 40.66%. Kabirdham has a sex ratio of 997 females for every 1000 males, and a literacy rate of 61.95%. 10.63% of the population lives in urban areas. Scheduled Castes and Scheduled Tribes make up 14.56% and 20.31% of the population respectively.

=== Languages ===
Languages of Kabirdham district (2011)
1. Chhattisgarhi (96.1%)
2. Hindi (2.32%)
3. Others (1.55%)

At the time of the 2011 Census of India, 96.13% of the population in the district spoke Chhattisgarhi and 2.32% Hindi as their first language.

== Divisions ==
The district is divided into four tehsils, Kabirdham, Bodla, Sahaspur - Lohara and Pandariya. Each tehsil is a single block of same name. The two Vidhan Sabha constituencies in this district are Kawardha and Pandariya.
