= Kawardha =

- Town
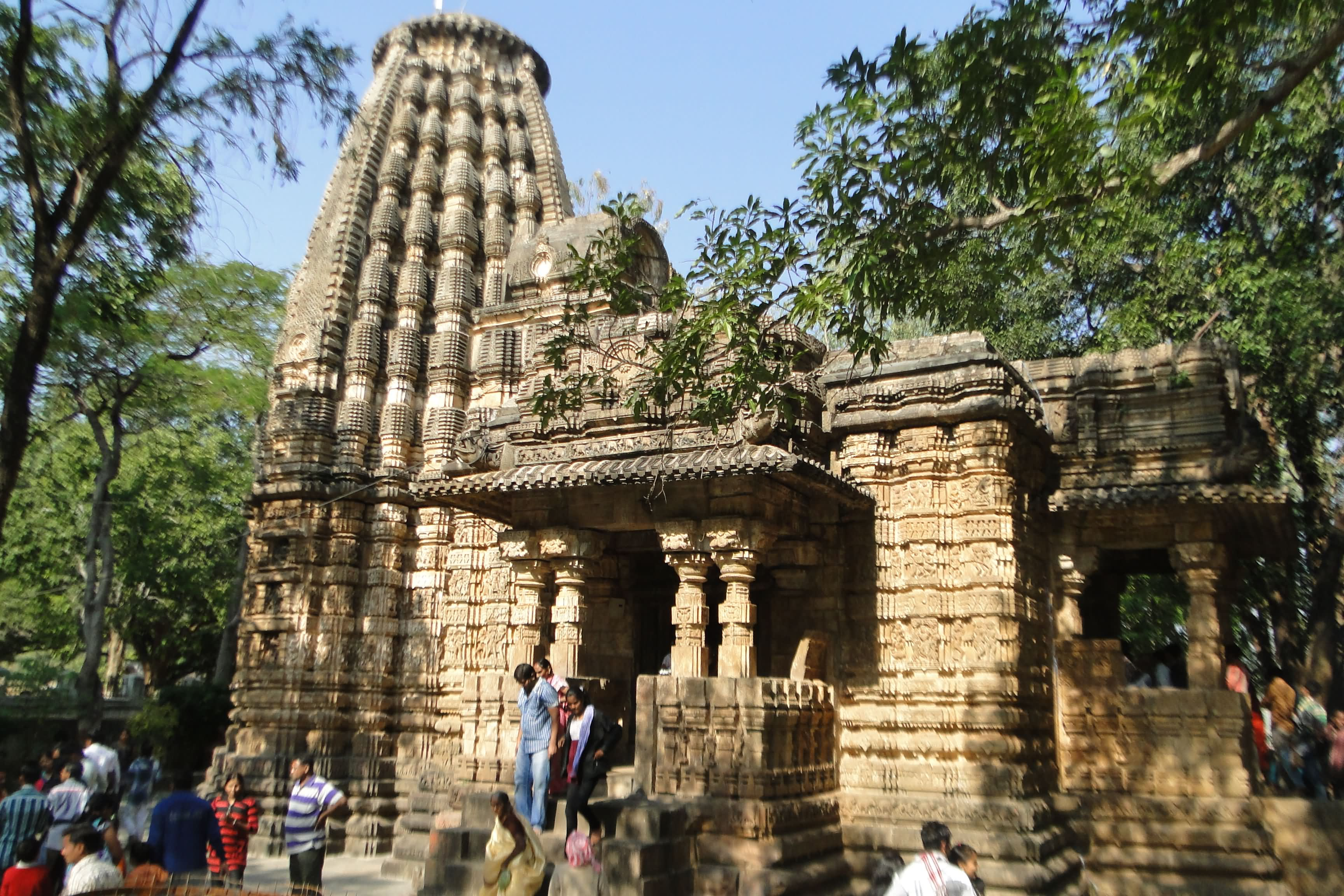
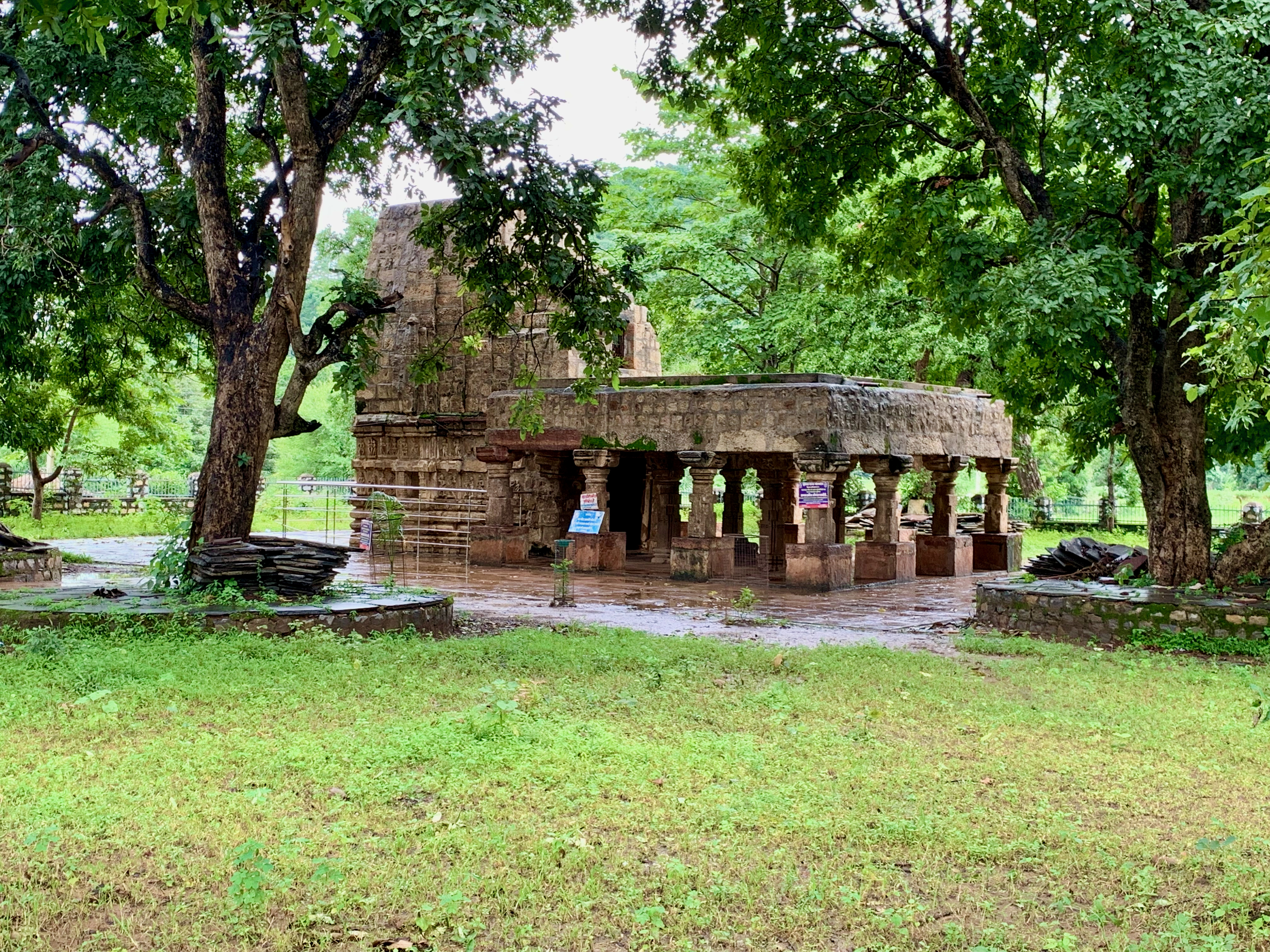
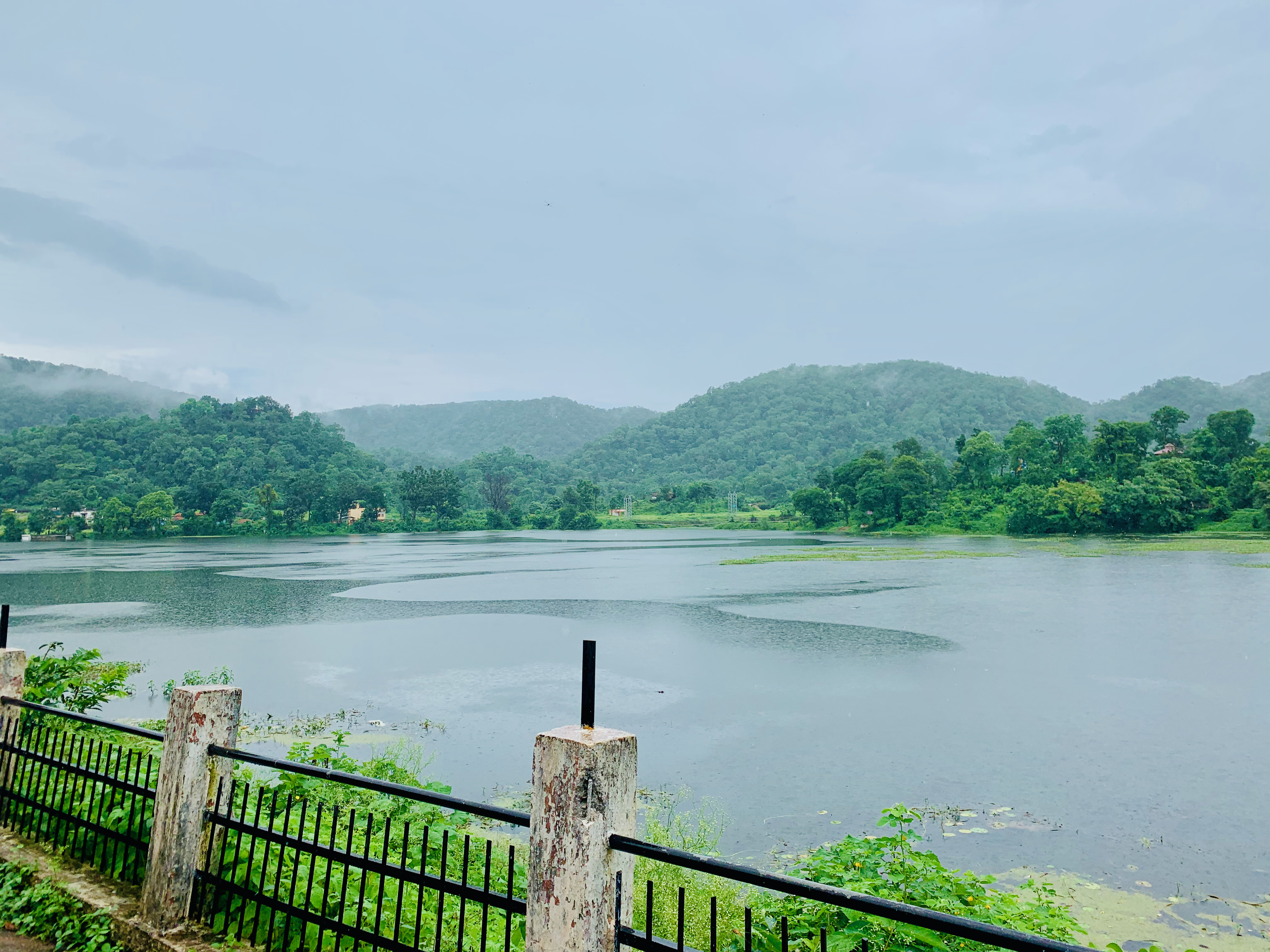
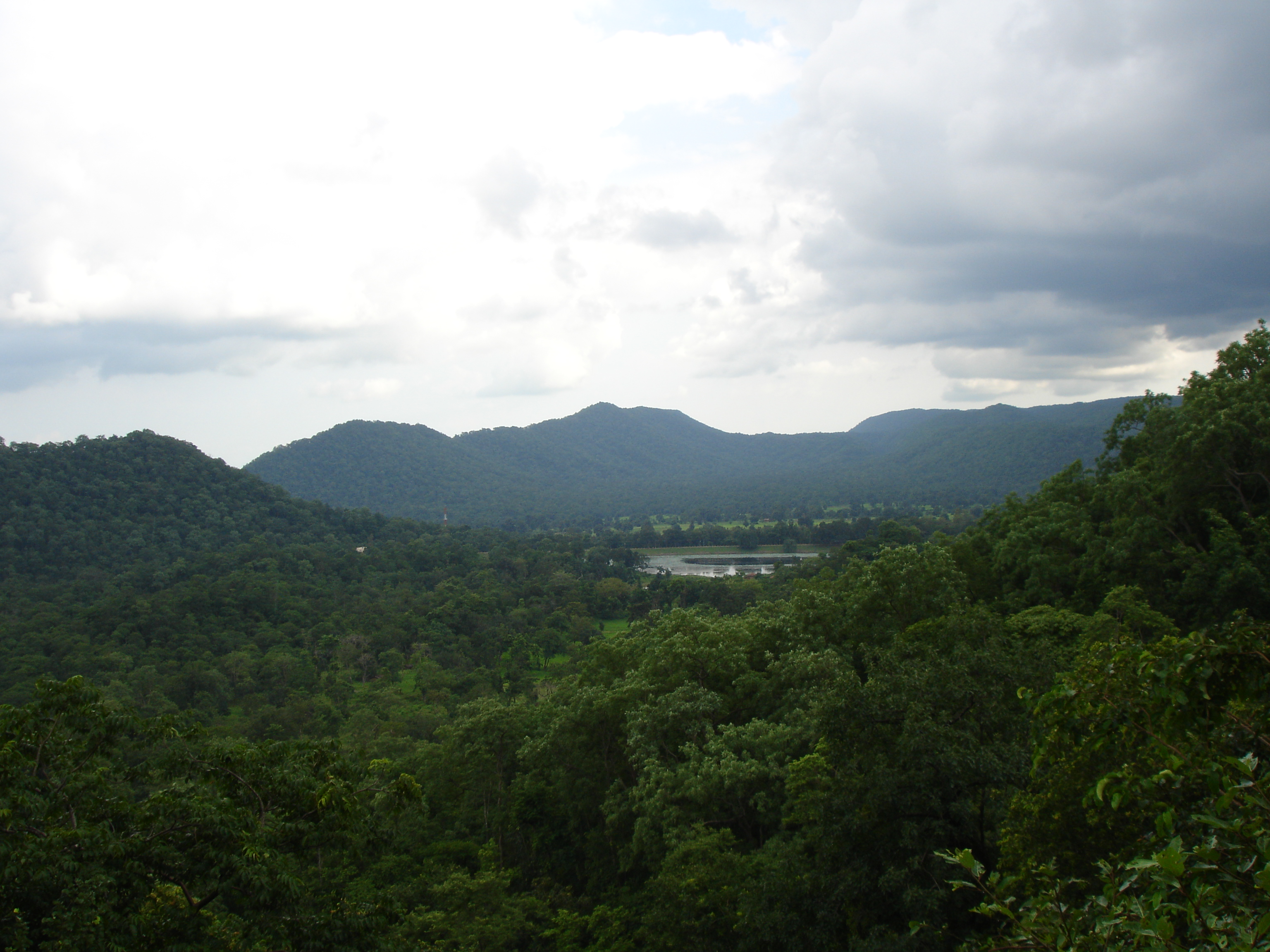
- From top to bottom: Bhoramdeo Temple, Madwa Mahal Temple, bhoramdeo lake, Maikal Hills

- Location in Chhattisgarh, India Kawardha (India)
- Coordinates: 22.02°N 81.25°E
- Country: India
- State: Chhattisgarh
- District: Kabirdham

Government
  - Body: municipality
  - MLA: Vijay Sharma (BJP)

Area
  - Total: 2,066 km^{2} (798 sq mi)
- Elevation: 353 m (1,158 ft)

Population (2012)
  - Total: 45,451
  - Density: 22.00/km^{2} (56.98/sq mi)

Languages
  - Official: Hindi, Chhattisgarhi
- Time zone: UTC+5:30 (IST)
- PIN: 491995
- Area code: 7741
- Vehicle registration: CG-09
- Website: kawardha.gov.in

Kawardha is a town and a municipality in Kabirdham district in the Indian state of Chhattisgarh. It is the administrative headquarters of Kabirdham district. Kawardha is also known for the "Temple of Bhoramdeo."

The Member of the Legislative Assembly (MLA) from Kawardha is Vijay Sharma of the Bharatiya Janata Party (BJP). The Collector of Kawardha is Gopal Verma.

== History ==
Kawardha State was founded in 1751 by Raja Mahabali Singh. According to legend its name would have originated in Kabirdham, Kabir's see, the current name of the district. In former times many Kabir panth adherents resided in the town. Kawardha State's last ruler, Maharaja Lal Dharamraj Singh, signed the accession to the Indian Union on 1 January 1948, so the state territory was merged into Bombay State, following its splits first assigned to Madhya Pradesh, finally to Chhattisgarh, Kawardha was the capital of Kawardha State, one of the princely states of the Eastern States Agency. In 1806 the Eighth Guru of Kabeer panth Haq Nam Saheb established a Guru Gaddi here. In 1936 Kawardha town became a municipality before independence. The famous Bhoramdev Temple is in the town.

== Geography ==
Kawardha is located at 22.02°N 81.25°E. The total area is 798 square miles (2,070 km^{2}). The state consists of hills and forests. It has an average elevation of 353 metres (1,158 ft).

== Demographics ==
At the 2011 India census, Kawardha had a population of 44,205. Males constitute 52% of the population and females 48%. Kawardha has an average literacy rate of 66%, higher than the national average of 59.5%: male literacy is 76%, and female literacy is 55%. In Kawardha, 15% of the population is under 6 years of age.

=== Web portals ===
Internet penetration is gaining pace in Kawardha.

Website name	URL	Notes
Kawardha - Government Website	http://kawardha.gov.in/	Official government website for the city. Land records and other e-governance projects are available from here.
District Environment Authority	http://www.environmentclearance.nic.in/Deiaa_OnlineSearch.aspx?type=ALLEC&state_id=33&distrcit_id=628	Mining of Minor Minerals Clearances
Kawardha- Zila Panchayat Website	http://www.zpkawardha.cgpanchayat.gov.in/	Official website of the Zila Panchayat of Kawardha

== Villages ==
- Ramehpur
