= National Institute of Technology, Raipur =

Public engineering institution in India

- Seal of the National Institute of Technology Raipur
- Former names: • Government College of Mining & Metallurgy • Government College of Engineering and Technology • Government Engineering College, Raipur
- Motto: Sanskrit: नित्यं यातो शुभोदयं
- Motto in English: Let the rise of goodness happen every day
- Type: Public engineering school (INI)
- Established: 1956; 70 years ago
- Affiliations: UGC India; MoE India; Washington Accord AICTE
- Chairman: Suresh Kashinath Haware
- Director: N. V. Ramana Rao
- Academic staff: 333
- Undergraduates: 4304
- Postgraduates: 1100
- Location: Raipur, Chhattisgarh, India; 21°14′57.84″N 81°36′17.64″E
- Campus: Urban, 100 acres (40.5 ha)
- Language: English
- Nickname: NITians
- Website: www.nitrr.ac.in

National Institute of Technology, Raipur (NIT Raipur or NITRR) is a public technical and research university located in Raipur, the capital of Chhattisgarh. Founded in 1956 with two engineering disciplines, namely Mining Engineering and Metallurgical Engineering, the institute focuses exclusively on science, technology, engineering, and architecture. It is recognized as an Institute of National Importance and funded by the Government of India under the National Institutes of Technology Act, 2007. It is one of the oldest institutes established under the National Institutes of Technology act.

NIT Raipur offers 5 Years, 4 Years & 2 Years degree programs. Admissions to the institute are through the Joint Entrance Examination and Graduate Aptitude Test in Engineering. It offers degrees such as: Four year Bachelor of Technology, five Year Bachelor of Architecture, three Year Master of Computer Application, 2 Year Master of Technology, and a few others. It also has a comprehensive graduate program offering doctoral degrees in Science, Technology, Engineering and Mathematics. It is currently undergoing accelerated growth through the World Bank-funded Technical Education Quality Improvement Program (TEQIP).

== History ==
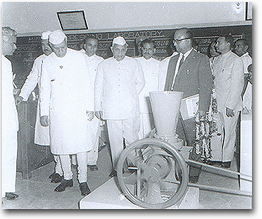
India's First Prime Minister Pt. Jawaharlal Nehru. On occasion of Institutes Inauguration.

=== Foundation and vision ===
The first President of India, Dr Rajendra Prasad laid the foundation stone of the college building on 14 September 1956. Construction was completed in 1962 and the college was inaugurated on 14 March 1963 by the first Prime Minister of India, Jawaharlal Nehru.

Until 1956, there were only three technical institutes in India for mining and metallurgical engineering. To fill the void and aim to harness the ample mineral resources in the region, the institute was set up on 1 May 1956 as "Government College of Mining and Metallurgy". The first session of the college commenced on 1 July 1956, with 15 students each in mining and metallurgical engineering courses.

=== Early developments ===
In 1958–59, with the commencement of additional courses in Civil, Mechanical, and Electrical engineering, the college came to be known as "Government College of Engineering and Technology". Later graduate courses in chemical engineering (1965), Architecture (1984), Electronics (1985), Information Technology and Computer Science & Technology (2000), and Biotechnology and Biomedical Engineering (2003) were started.

=== Recent history ===
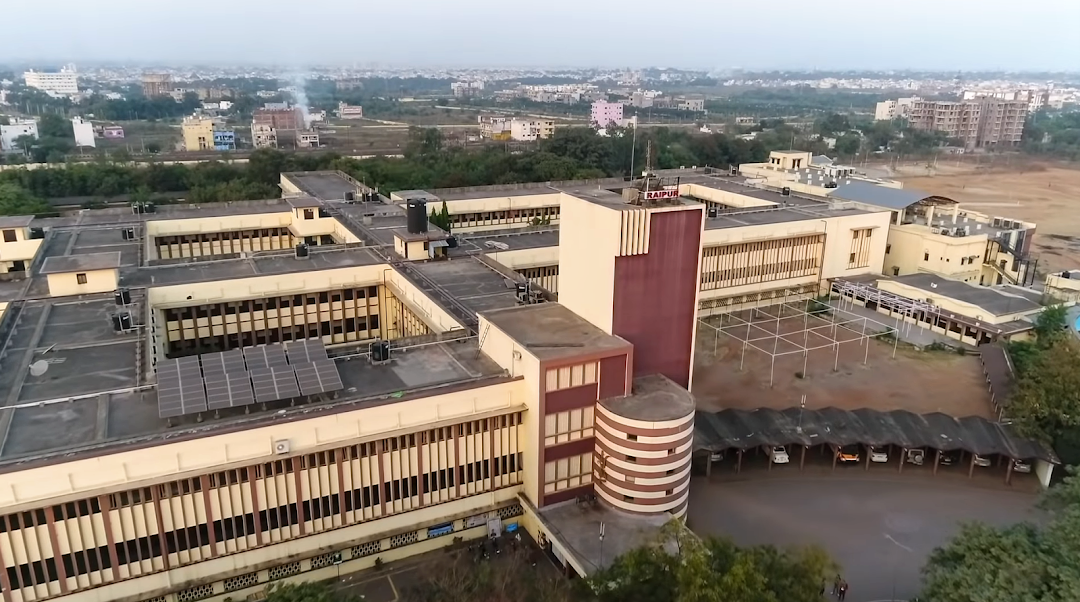
Administrative Tower

Following the long-standing demand for more Indian Institutes of Technology (IITs) the then Minister of Human Resource Development, Murali Manohar Joshi decided to upgrade the Regional Engineering Colleges (RECs) to NITs. In 2003 all RECs were upgraded to NITs and the central government took control of these Institutes. Ministry of Human Resource Development issued NIT status to three more colleges besides the RECs. This was done to provide one NIT in every new state carved out of its parent state whose NIT was lost due to the bifurcation. As a result, this institute (the then GCET) was declared a National Institute of Technology (NIT) by the Government of India on 1 December 2005. It was confirmed the status of Institute of National Importance with the passing of the National Institutes of Technology Act, 2007, in May 2007.

== Campus ==
=== Campus ===
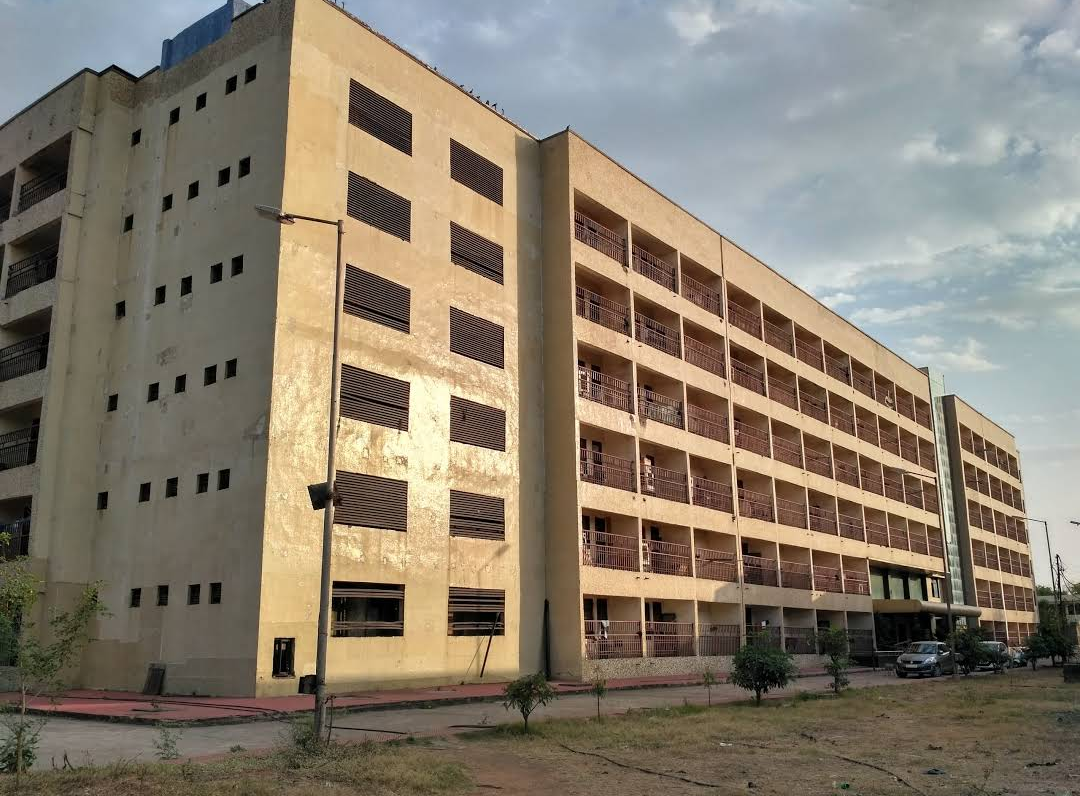
Hostel 8 (Sirpur), Largest hostel in central India.

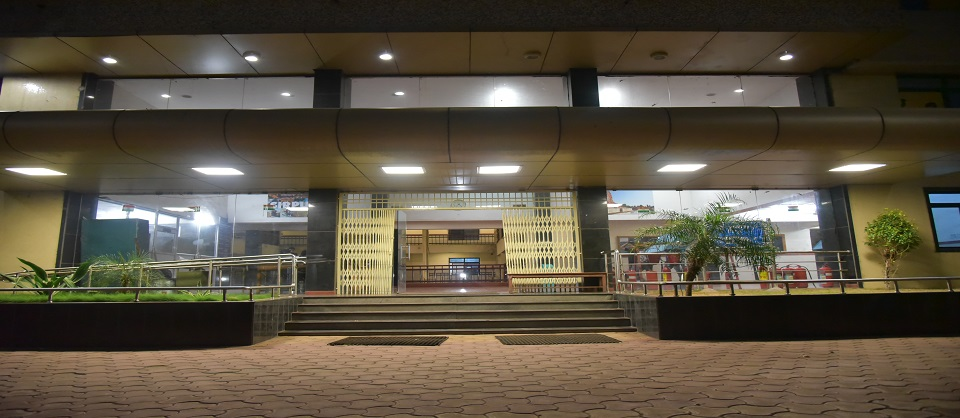
Hostel Entrance.

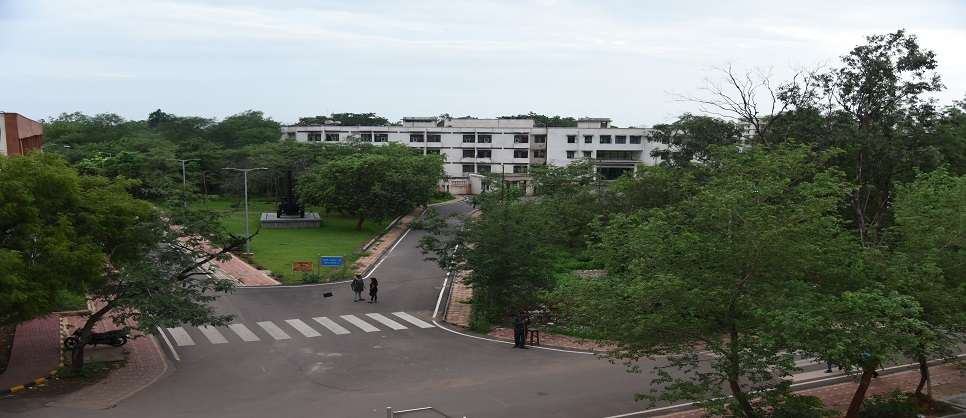
Campus (West) Streets.

The institute has a large built area, covering 62060 sq.m. It is a triple-storied planned structure along with a central tower standing up to the height of 23 meters. There are 35 lecture halls extending over an area of 6675 sq.m & 13 drawing halls/studios extending over an area of 3510 sq.m. An Architecture block for the B.Arch students is well equipped with Auditorium, Architectural library, Material lab, Workshop and Studios. There are about 85 labs over an area of 11510 sq.m. The other amenities consist of a small canteen, cycle stand, N.C.C, N.S.S department, a student activity center, co-operative store, dispensary, and a Makerspace. The building is being further extended for the architecture and electronics departments.

=== Student housing ===
There are separate hostels for boys and girls: six for boys and two for girls. Each hostel has its own mess. Dinner is not provided on Sundays only in the boys' hostel. The two girl's hostels have a capacity of 250 and 150. Admission to the hostel depends upon the Joint Entrance Examination – Main rank and the distance of their native place from the institute.

Residential Hostels for Students
HOSTEL-1 (MAINPAT)	HOSTEL-6 (KOTUMSAR)
HOSTEL-2 (CHITRAKOT)	HOSTEL-7 Girls Hostel
HOSTEL-3 (TIRATHGARH)	HOSTEL-8 (SIRPUR BLOCK-I)
HOSTEL-4 (MALHAR)	HOSTEL-8 (SIRPUR BLOCK-II)
HOSTEL-5 Girls Hostel	HOSTEL-PG Girls Hostel

== Organisation and administration ==
=== Departments ===
At present the institute offers graduate level courses in twelve disciplines.

The institute currently has the following departments:

Engineering	Other Departments
Bio Medical Engineering; Bio Technology; Chemical Engineering; Civil Engineering; Computer Science & Engineering; Electrical Engineering; Electronics & Communication Engineering; Information Technology; Mechanical Engineering; Mining Engineering; Metallurgical Engineering	Department of Humanities & Social Sciences; Master In Computer Application; Workshop (Allied Department); Department of Sports
Science	Architecture
Chemistry; Physics; Mathematics; Applied Geology	Bachelor of Architecture

== Academics ==
=== Admissions ===
- Admission to the undergraduate programmes is based on the rank secured in the Joint Entrance Examination (Main) which is an all India level competitive exam. Candidates must also secure at least 75% marks in the 12th class examination, or be in the top 20 percentile in the 12th class examination conducted by the respective Boards. For Scheduled Castes/Scheduled Tribes students, the qualifying marks are 65% in the 12th class examination. The Joint entrance exam (Main) is considered to be one of the toughest examinations.
- NIT Raipur follows the reservation policy notified by the Supreme Court of India, according to which 27% of the seats are reserved for Other Backward Classes (OBCs), 15% for Scheduled Castes (SCs), 7.5% for Scheduled Tribes (STs) and 10% for economically weaker i.e. EWS category students. The institute also accepts foreign nationals through scholarships awarded by the Government of India, and non-resident Indians through an independent scheme known as Direct Admission for Students Abroad that uses SAT scores.
- Admissions to the postgraduate programmes are through the Graduate Aptitude Test in Engineering (GATE) for the Master of Technology (M.Tech.) and Master of Science programs (taught and research), and through NIMCET for the Master of Computer Applications (MCA) program.

=== Undergraduate education ===
The institute awards Bachelor of Technology (B.Tech.) degrees in eleven engineering disciplines as well as the Bachelor of Architecture (B.Arch) degree.

=== Postgraduate education ===
The institute also offers post graduate programmes in science and engineering viz; leading to a Master of Science (M.Sc.) and Master of Technology (M.Tech.). The Department of Computer Applications offers a three-year post-graduate programme, Master of Computer Applications (MCA). Institute's most of the academic departments offer Doctor of Philosophy (PhD) degree programmes under their own respective HODs.

=== Central Library ===
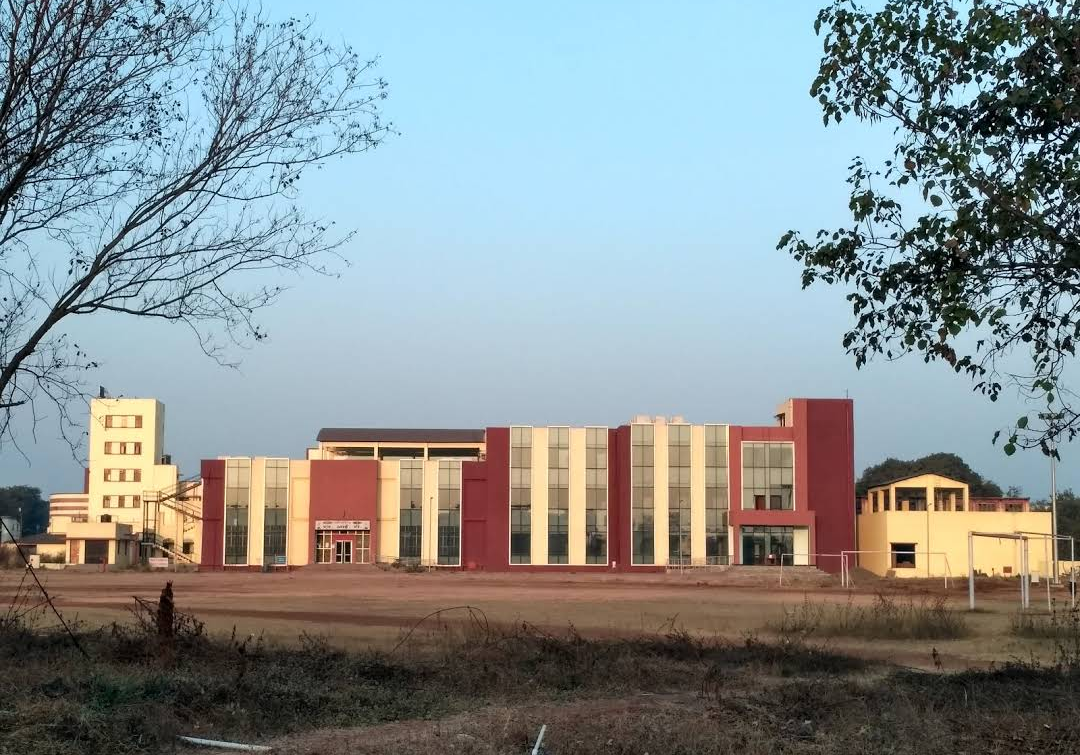
Central Computer Center (CCC)

The Central Library of NIT, Raipur has a collection of more than 1 crore documents consisting of text books, reference books and back volume journals. Besides it has subscription to a good numbers of print journals and online resources. The library automation program through LibSys7- Library management software is in progress .It caters to the information and documents need of nearly 5000 users consisting of Faculty members, staff, B.Tech/M.Tech/MCA students and research scholars.

=== Rankings ===
National Institute of Technology, Raipur (NITRR) was ranked 86 among engineering colleges by the National Institutional Ranking Framework (NIRF) in 2025. It is the second highest ranked Engineering college in Chhattisgarh, after IIT Bhilai recently surpassed it (ranked 72) in NIRF 2025 Rankings (Engineering). It is also one of the only two Engineering colleges in Chhattisgarh which ranked under 100 in Engineering by the National Institutional Ranking Framework, the other being IIT Bhilai.

== Student life ==
=== Sports ===
All the sports activities are managed by students under the guidance of SAS Officer and Faculty In-Charge Sports. The prime bodies under sports department are activity center and GYM, which provide avenues for various sports events and indoor and outdoor games. Students are also encouraged and facilitated to take part in similar events in other institutions. An crucial role is played by Sports department of the institute in facilitating the activities and reaching out to the students. GYM is an Institute governed organization that cultivates leadership, encourages students to participate in outdoor activities, and provides facilities for games and sports. The members of the staff, monitor activities of Gym and help students in organizing and managing events etc. Sports department provides facilities for outdoor games like Athletics, Cricket, Football, Hockey, Badminton, Basketball, Baseball, Lawn Tennis, Swimming, Gymnastics, Yoga Exercises, and Volleyball etc. Each game is looked after by a captain and sports officer.

=== Guest House ===
Guest House of the institute provides accommodation to the institute's guests, guests of the students, parents of the students, visitors from other NITs and educational institutes, participants of the activities organized by the institute and persons having approval from appropriate authorities. Guest house has three living rooms, one dining hall and one common hall.

=== Festivities ===
The student clubs hosts a number of annual fests or events, inviting participants from colleges across the nation.

== Notable people ==
=== Notable alumni ===
The institute has an active alumni network, with chapters across India, United States and Europe.

Notable alumni include chief executive officers and top executives of Fortune India 500 companies:

- Abid Ali Neemuchwala, Former Chief Executive Officer (CEO) of Wipro
- Sudhir Vasudeva (1974/Che), Former Chairman & Managing Director at ONGC
- Vinay Awasthi, Managing Director - Greater Asia of Hewlett-Packard.
- R. Madhavan, Former CMD of Hindustan Aeronautics Limited.

Bureaucrats:

- Deepak Khandekar (1985/Civil), Personnel Secretary (India). Former Chief Secretary, Ministry of Tribal Affairs

In the academic world, they include deans and chairs of faculties:

- Baldev Raj, Padma Shri recipient and director of the Indira Gandhi Centre for Atomic Research (IGCAR)
- Dharma Agrawal, Distinguished Professor of Electrical Engineering and Computing Systems at the University of Cincinnati

Politicians:

- Gaurishankar Agrawal, former Speaker of Chhattisgarh Legislative Assembly
- Abhishek Singh, Member of Parliament from Rajnandgaon
- Shivshankar Painkra, Member of Chhattisgarh Legislative Assembly
- Zale Neikha, Member of Nagaland Legislative Assembly

Artists:

- Budhaditya Mukherjee, Padma Bhushan recipient and first artist in history to perform in the House of Commons, London.

=== Notable faculty ===
- Ajit Jogi, first Chief Minister of the state of Chhattisgarh.

== See also ==
- Indian Institutes of Technology
- National Institutes of Technology
- Institutes of National Importance

NIT Raipur is hosting the NASA International Space Apps Challenge 2025 on 4th & 5th October 2025.
