= Shivendra Bahadur Singh =

Indian politician

Member of Parliament, Lok Sabha
- In office 1980-1989
- Preceded by: Madan Tiwary
- Succeeded by: Dharmpal Singh Gupta
- In office 1991-1996
- Preceded by: Dharmpal Singh Gupta
- Succeeded by: Ashok Sharma
- Constituency: Rajnandgaon, Madhya Pradesh

Personal details
- Born: 7 January 1943 Nagpur, Maharashtra
- Died: 31 December 1999 (aged 56) Rajnandgaon, Chhattisgarh, India
- Party: Indian National Congress
- Spouse: Geeta Devi
- Children: Bhavani Bahadur Singh
- Parent(s): Major Raja Birendra Bahadur Singh (Father); Rani Padmavati Devi (Mother)
- Education: The Doon School; Bombay University

Lal Shivendra Bahadur Singh is an Indian politician and Belonging to the Khairagarh State Royal family. He was elected to the Lok Sabha, the lower house of the Parliament of India from Rajnandgaon, Madhya Pradesh as a member of the Indian National Congress.He was widely recognized in national political circles as a close childhood friend and classmate of former Prime Minister Rajiv Gandhi.

== Early Life and Royal Lineage ==
Maharajkumar Lal Shivendra Bahadur Singh, belonged to the Historic Nagavanshi (Raj Gond) Rajput ruling dynasty of the Khairagarh State. He was born on 7 January 1943 in Nagpur, Maharashtra.He was the younger son of Major Raja Birendra Bahadur Singh, the last ruling chief of the Khairagarh State, and Rani Padmavati Devi. His elder brother was Raja Ravindra Bahadur Singh.

His parents notably donated their ancestral palace to establish the Indira Kala Sangeet Vishwavidyalaya, Khairagarh (Asia's first university dedicated solely to music and fine arts) in memory of his late sister, Rajkumar Indira Singh.

He married Kumari Geeta Devi on 19 April 1968. She was the daughter of Rajkumar Chandra Bhan Singh of Kashipur. Geeta Devi also actively participated in public life and later served as the State Social Welfare Minister. The couple had two sons. His nephew, Devvrat Singh (son of Raja Ravindra Bahadur), also continued the family legacy, serving as an MP and MLA from Khairagarh. He has a son named Lal Bhawani Bahadur Singh.

== Education ==
He received his early education at the elite boarding school, The Doon School in Dehradun. It was here, between 1955 and 1962, that he studied alongside Rajiv Gandhi, forging a lifelong personal bond and earning the status of his close companion ("Bal Sakha"). He later moved to Mumbai and earned a Bachelor of Arts (B.A.) degree from Bombay University. He also attended Kirori Mal College in Delhi and pursued specialized courses in agriculture. Beyond his royal and political duties, he was a trained musician, an avid agriculturist, and worked briefly as a management consultant.

== Political career ==
During the 1980s and early 1990s, Lal Shivendra Bahadur Singh was considered a powerhouse in the Congress politics of undivided Madhya Pradesh. He held absolute influence over administrative decisions and candidate selection in the Rajnandgaon district.

Electoral Debut (1977): He entered active politics by contesting the Khairagarh assembly seat in the 1977 state elections on an Indian National Congress (INC) ticket but was unsuccessful.

Entry into Parliament (1980 & 1984): In the 1980 Lok Sabha elections, at the personal recommendation of Rajiv Gandhi, Prime Minister Indira Gandhi granted him the party ticket. He won the Rajnandgaon Lok Sabha seat with a massive majority. He successfully retained the seat during the 1984 general elections, establishing his dominance in the region.

The 1991 Return: After losing the seat in 1989, he staged a political comeback by winning the 1991 Lok Sabha mid-term elections, securing his third and final tenure in Parliament.

Later Politics: In the late 1990s, when the Congress party began prioritizing senior leader Motilal Vora for the Rajnandgaon seat, Shivendra Bahadur contested under the Janata Dal banner but lost. He gradually withdrew from active mainstream politics after this phase.
