= Rajnandgaon Lok Sabha constituency =

Lok Sabha Constituency in Chhattisgarh, India

Coordinates: 21.1°N 81.0°E

Rajnandgaon CG-6
- Lok Sabha constituency

Constituency details
- Country: India
- Region: Central India
- State: Chhattisgarh
- Assembly constituencies: Pandariya; Kawardha; Khairagarh; Dongargarh; Rajnandgaon; Dongargaon; Khujji; Mohla-Manpur
- Established: 1952
- Total electors: 18,68,021
- Reservation: None

Member of Parliament
- 18th Lok Sabha
- Incumbent Santosh Pandey
- Party: Bharatiya Janata Party
- Elected year: 2024

Rajnandgaon is a Lok Sabha constituency in the Indian state of Chhattisgarh.

== Assembly segments ==
Rajnandgaon Lok Sabha constituency is composed of the following eight assembly segments:

#	Name	District	Member	Party	Leading (in 2024)
71	Pandariya	Kabirdham	Bhawna Bohra	BJP	INC
72	Kawardha	Kabirdham	Vijay Sharma	BJP	BJP
73	Khairagarh	Khairagarh	Yashoda Verma	INC	BJP
74	Dongargarh (SC)	Rajnandgaon	Harshita Swami Baghel	INC	BJP
75	Rajnandgaon	Rajnandgaon	Raman Singh	BJP	BJP
76	Dongargaon	Rajnandgaon	Daleshwar Sahu	INC	BJP
77	Khujji	Rajnandgaon	Bholaram Sahu	INC	INC
78	Mohla-Manpur (ST)	Mohla-Manpur	Indrashah Mandavi	INC	INC

== Members of Parliament ==
Year	Member	Party
1957	Raja Bahadur Singh	Indian National Congress
1962	Raja Bahadur Singh	Indian National Congress
1967	Padmawati Devi	Indian National Congress
1971	Ramsahai Pandey	Indian National Congress
1977	Madan Tiwary	Janata Party
1980	Shivendra Bahadur Singh	Indian National Congress
1984	Shivendra Bahadur Singh	Indian National Congress
1989	Dharmpal Singh Gupta	Bharatiya Janata Party
1991	Shivendra Bahadur Singh	Indian National Congress
1996	Ashok Sharma	Bharatiya Janata Party
1998	Motilal Vora	Indian National Congress
1999	Raman Singh	Bharatiya Janata Party
2004	Pradeep Gandhi	Bharatiya Janata Party
2007^	Devwrat Singh	Indian National Congress
2009	Madhusudan Yadav	Bharatiya Janata Party
2014	Abhishek Singh	Bharatiya Janata Party
2019	Santosh Pandey	Bharatiya Janata Party
2024	Santosh Pandey	Bharatiya Janata Party

- ^ denotes by-election

== Election results ==
=== 2024 ===
2024 Indian general election: Rajnandgaon
Party	Candidate	Votes	%	±%
BJP	Santosh Pandey	712,057	49.25	▼1.43
INC	Bhupesh Baghel	6,67,646	46.18	▲4.07
IND.	A. H. Siddique	10,737	0.74	New
BSP	Devlal Sinha (Sonvanshi)	9,668	0.67	▼1.46
NOTA	None of the above	9,553	0.66	▼0.65
Majority		44,411	3.07	−5.50
Turnout		14,47,888	77.46	
BJP hold		Swing		

=== 2019 ===
2019 Indian general elections: Rajnandgaon
Party	Candidate	Votes	%	±%
BJP	Santosh Pandey	662,387	50.68	▼3.93
INC	Bhola Ram Sahu	5,50,421	42.11	▲7.52
BSP	Ravita Lakra (Dhruv)	17,145	1.31	▼0.43
NOTA	None of the above	19,436	1.49	▼1.26
Margin of victory		1,11,966	8.57	▼11.45
Turnout		13,07,878	76.20	▲2.16
BJP hold		Swing		

=== 2014 ===
2014 Indian general elections: Rajnandgaon
Party	Candidate	Votes	%	±%
BJP	Abhishek Singh	643,473	54.61	▲1.91
INC	Kamleshwar Verma	4,07,562	34.59	▼3.77
NOTA	None of the above	32,385	2.75	N/A
BSP	Anand Sahu	20,458	1.74	▼0.18
API	Narendra Bansod	11,704	0.99	New
Margin of victory		2,35,911	20.02	▲5.68
Turnout		11,78,305	74.04	▲15.18
BJP hold		Swing		

=== 2009 ===
2009 Indian general elections: Rajnandgaon
Party	Candidate	Votes	%	±%
BJP	Madhusudan Yadav	437,721	52.70	▲12.83
INC	Devwrat Singh	3,18,647	38.36	▼8.52
IND.	D. R. Yadav Pracharya	19,984	2.41	N/A
BSP	Pradhuman Netam	15,956	1.92	▼1.46
Margin of victory		1,19,074	14.34	▲7.33
Turnout		8.30,581	58.86	▼4.44
BJP gain from INC		Swing		

=== 1999 ===
1999 Indian general election: Rajnandgaon
Party	Candidate	Votes	%	±%
BJP	Raman Singh	304,611	51.46	▲10.70
INC	Motilal Vora	2,77,896	46.94	▼2.25
Independent	Deosingh Nandeshwar	2,847	0.48	N/A
GGP	Ramesh Kumar Gond	2,735	0.46	N/A
Majority		26,715	4.52	▼3.91
Turnout		5,91,992	59.37	N/A
BJP gain from INC		Swing		

=== 1998 ===
1998 Indian general election: Rajnandgaon
Party	Candidate	Votes	%	±%
INC	Motilal Vora	304,709	49.19	N/A
BJP	Ashok Sharma	2,52,468	40.76	N/A
Majority		52,241	8.43	N/A
Turnout		6,19,439	N/A	
INC gain from BJP		Swing		

== See also ==
- Rajnandgaon
- List of constituencies of the Lok Sabha
