= Shivshankar Painkra =

Indian politician

Member of Chhattisgarh Legislative Assembly
- In office 2013–2018
- Constituency: Pathalgaon

Personal details
- Born: Shivshankar Painkra
- Party: Bhartiya Janata Party
- Education: National Institute of Technology, Raipur

Shivshankar Painkra is a politician from Chhattisgarh. He was elected to the Chhattisgarh Legislative Assembly in 2013 from Pathalgaon, Jashpur as candidate of Bhartiya Janata Party.

Painkra is a graduate in Civil Engineering from National Institute of Technology, Raipur.
