= Ramsahai Pandey =

Indian politician (1920–1987)

Member of Parliament, Lok Sabha
- In office 1971–1977
- Preceded by: Padmawati Devi
- Succeeded by: Madan Tiwary
- Constituency: Rajnandgaon, Madhya Pradesh

Personal details
- Born: 14 September 1920
- Died: 21 September 1987 (aged 67) Bombay, India
- Party: Indian National Congress

Ramsahai Pandey (14 September 1920 – 21 September 1987) was an Indian politician. He was elected to the Lok Sabha, the lower house of the Parliament of India from Rajnandgaon, Madhya Pradesh as a member of the Indian National Congress.

Pandey died in Bombay on 21 September 1987, at the age of 67.
