= Madhusudan Yadav =

Indian politician

Mayor, Rajnandgaon Municipal Corporation
- In office 15 January 2015 – 2 January 2020
- Succeeded by: Hema Deshmukh

Member of Indian Parliament
- In office May 2009 – May 2014
- Preceded by: Devwrat Singh
- Succeeded by: Abhishek Singh
- Constituency: Rajnandgaon

Personal details
- Born: Madhusudan Yadav; 22 August 1970 (age 55) Rajnandgaon, Chhattisgarh.
- Party: Bharatiya Janata Party.
- Spouse: Mrs. Karuna Yadav.
- Children: 02
- Parent(s): Mr. Durga Prashad (father) & Mrs. Thagiya Devi (mother).
- Education: Higher Secondary.
- Occupation: Politician, Agriculturist & Businessperson.

Madhusudan Yadav (born 22 August 1970) is an Indian Politician from Bharatiya Janta Party. He was a member of the 15th Lok Sabha of India representing the Rajnandgaon constituency of Chhattisgarh.

== Political career ==
Yadav was first elected to 15th Lok Sabha by defeating Devwrat Singh of Indian National Congress by margin of over 100,000 votes in the 2009 Indian general election. In 2015, he became Mayor of Rajnandgaon Municipal Corporation. He contested 2018 Chhattisgarh Legislative Assembly election from Dongargaon Vidhan Sabha but lost from Daleshwar Singh Sahu of Indian National Congress.

In December 2011, Madhusudan Yadav advocated inclusion of Group C employees under the proposed Jan Lokpal Bill.

== See also ==
- List of members of the 15th Lok Sabha of India
