= Khairagarh Assembly constituency =

Legislative Assembly constituency in Chhattisgarh State, India

Coordinates: 21.42°N 80.98°E

Khairagarh
- Constituency No. 73 for the Chhattisgarh Legislative Assembly

Constituency details
- Country: India
- Region: Central India
- State: Chhattisgarh
- District: Rajnandgaon
- Lok Sabha constituency: Rajnandgaon
- Established: 2003
- Total electors: 219,825
- Reservation: None

Member of Legislative Assembly
- 6th Chhattisgarh Legislative Assembly
- Incumbent Yashoda Verma
- Party: Indian National Congress
- Elected year: 2023
- Preceded by: Devwrat Singh

Khairagarh is one of the 90 Legislative Assembly constituencies of Chhattisgarh state in India. It is in Rajnandgaon district.

== Members of Legislative Assembly ==
Election	Name	Party
Madhya Pradesh Legislative Assembly
1952	Raja Bahadur Birendra Bahadur Singh	Indian National Congress
1957	Rituparna Kishoredas	Indian National Congress
1962	Gyanendra Singh	Indian National Congress
1967	V. B. Singh	Indian National Congress
1972	Vijayalal Oswal	Indian National Congress
1977	Manik Gupta	Janata Party
1980	Rashmi Devi Singh	Indian National Congress
1985	Rashmi Devi Singh	Indian National Congress
1990	Rashmi Devi Singh	Indian National Congress
1993	Rashmi Devi Singh	Indian National Congress
1998	Devwrat Singh	Indian National Congress
Chhattisgarh Legislative Assembly
2003	Devwrat Singh	Indian National Congress
2008	Komal Janghel	Bharatiya Janata Party
2013	Girwar Janghel	Indian National Congress
2018	Devwrat Singh	Janta Congress Chhattisgarh
2022^	Yashoda Verma	Indian National Congress
2023	Yashoda Verma	Indian National Congress

^by-election

== Election results ==
=== 2023 ===
2023 Chhattisgarh Legislative Assembly election: Khairagarh
Party	Candidate	Votes	%	±%
INC	Yashoda Nilamber Verma	89,704	49.26	−3.71
BJP	Vikrant Singh	84,070	46.16	+5.35
NOTA	None of the Above	2,312	1.27	−0.31
Majority		5,634	3.10	−9.06
Turnout		182,109	82.84	+4.43
INC hold		Swing		

=== 2022 by-election ===
A by-election was needed due to the death of the sitting MLA, Devwrat Singh on 4 November 2021.

2022 By-Election: Khairagarh
Party	Candidate	Votes	%	±%
INC	Yashoda Nilamber Verma	87,879	52.97	+34.31
BJP	Komal Janghel	67,703	40.81	+5.24
Forward Democratic Labour Party	Viplav Sahu (Churan)	2,412	1.45	
NOTA	None of the Above	2,616	1.58	−0.22
Majority		20,176	12.16	+11.65
Turnout		1,65,919	78.41	−6.10
INC gain from JCC		Swing		

=== 2018 ===
2018 Chhattisgarh Legislative Assembly election: Khairagarh
Party	Candidate	Votes	%	±%
JCC	Devwrat Singh	61,516	36.08	New
BJP	Komal Janghel	60,646	35.57	
INC	Girwar Janghel	31,811	18.66	
Independent	Sarju Janghel	4,060	2.38	
SS	Dinesh Singh	1,775	1.04	
NOTA	None of the Above	3,068	1.80	
Majority		870	0.51	
Turnout		1,70,621	84.51	
JCC gain from INC		Swing		

== See also ==
- List of constituencies of the Chhattisgarh Legislative Assembly
- Rajnandgaon district
- Rajnandgaon
