= Madan Tiwary =

Indian politician

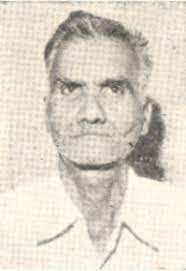

Member of Parliament, Lok Sabha
- In office 25 March 1977 — 14 January 1980
- Preceded by: Ramsahai Pandey
- Succeeded by: Shivendra Bahadur Singh
- Constituency: Rajnandgaon, [Madhya Pradesh

Personal details
- Born: 26 March 1923 Durg
- Died: 2013 Rajnandgaon
- Party: Samyukta Socialist Party
- Parent: Harkhu Prasad Tiwary

Madan Tiwary (1923-2011) was an Indian politician. He was elected to the Lok Sabha, the lower house of the Parliament of India from Rajnandgaon, Madhya Pradesh as a member of the Janata Party.
