= Khujji Assembly constituency =

Legislative Assembly constituency in Chhattisgarh State, India

Coordinates: 20.95°N 80.88°E

Khujji
- Constituency No. 77 for the Chhattisgarh Legislative Assembly

Constituency details
- Country: India
- Region: Central India
- State: Chhattisgarh
- District: Rajnandgaon
- Lok Sabha constituency: Rajnandgaon
- Established: 1963
- Total electors: 191,582
- Reservation: None

Member of Legislative Assembly
- 6th Chhattisgarh Legislative Assembly
- Incumbent Bholaram Sahu
- Party: Indian National Congress
- Elected year: 2023

Khujji Assembly Constituency is one of the 90 Legislative Assembly constituencies of Chhattisgarh state in India.

It is part of Rajnandgaon district. As of 2024, it is represented by Bholaram Sahu of the Indian National Congress party.

== Members of the Legislative Assembly ==
Election	Name	Party
Madhya Pradesh Legislative Assembly
Before 1963: Constituency did not exist
1967	H. P. Shukla	Indian National Congress
1972	Baldev Prasad Mishra	Indian National Congress
1977	Prakash Yadav	Janata Party
1980	Hari Prasad Shukla	Independent politician
1985	Imran Memon	Indian National Congress
1990	Jagannath Yadav	Janata Dal
1993	Rajinder Pal Singh Bhatia	Bharatiya Janata Party
1998	Rajinder Pal Singh Bhatia	Bharatiya Janata Party
Chhattisgarh Legislative Assembly
2003	Rajinder Pal Singh Bhatia	Bharatiya Janata Party
2008	Bholaram Sahu	Indian National Congress
2013	Bholaram Sahu	Indian National Congress
2018	Chhanni Chandu Sahu	Indian National Congress
2023	Bholaram Sahu	Indian National Congress

== Election results ==
=== 2023 ===
2023 Chhattisgarh Legislative Assembly election: Khujji
Party	Candidate	Votes	%	±%
INC	Bholaram Sahu	80,465	50.64	+3.46
BJP	Geeta Ghasi Sahu	54,521	34.31	+5.22
Hamar Raj Party	Lalita Kanwar	15,029	9.46	New
Independent	Ramshila Sonboir	1,612	1.01	
NOTA	None of the Above	1,591	1.00	+0.09
Majority		25,944	16.33	−1.76
Turnout		158,887	82.93	−1.83
INC hold		Swing		

=== 2018 ===
2018 Chhattisgarh Legislative Assembly election: Khujji
Party	Candidate	Votes	%	±%
INC	Chhanni Chandu Sahu	71,733	47.18	
BJP	Hirendra Kumar Sahu	44,236	29.09	
JCC	Jarnail Singh Bhatiya	14,507	9.54	New
Independent	Madan Lal Netam	6,766	4.45	
Independent	Ramkrishn Yadu	3,536	2.33	
Independent	Devi Lal Markam	2,699	1.78	
NOTA	None of the Above	1,383	0.91	
Majority		27,497	18.09	
Turnout		151,452	84.76	
INC hold		Swing		

== See also ==
- List of constituencies of the Chhattisgarh Legislative Assembly
- Rajnandgaon district
