= Suresh Kashinath Haware =

Indian politician

Personal details
- Born: 1 March 1956 (age 70)
- Party: Bharatiya Janata Party
- Occupation: Managing Director

Suresh Haware or Suresh Kashinath Haware is a member of the Bharatiya Janata Party (BJP) from the Belapur constituency. He was a nuclear scientist till he became a politician. Haware is also the managing director of Haware Engineers & Builders Pvt. Ltd. Haware has stood in the 2009 elections from Belapur constituency.

He is also the current Chairman of National Institute of Technology Raipur.
