= Bholaram Sahu =

Indian politician

Member of Chhattisgarh Legislative Assembly
- Incumbent
- Assumed office 3 December 2023
- Preceded by: Chhanni Chandu Sahu
- In office December 2008 – 11 December 2018
- Preceded by: Rajinder Pal Singh Bhatia
- Succeeded by: Chhanni Chandu Sahu
- Constituency: Khujji

Personal details
- Born: Bholaram Sahu; 3 January 1959 (age 67) Khujji, Rajnandgaon, India
- Party: Indian National Congress
- Education: High school
- Occupation: Politician, Agriculture

Bholaram Sahu (born 3 January 1959) is an Indian politician from Chhattisgarh. He is a three time MLA from Khujji Assembly constituency, representing the Indian National Congress in the Chhattisgarh Legislative Assembly.

== Political career ==
Bholaram Sahu first elected MLA in 2008 and retained the seat for the Indian National Congress in 2013 Assembly election. He is a third time MLA from Khujji. But he lost election in 2019 Indian General election from Rajnandgaon Loksabha against BJP's Santosh Pandey. However, he regained the seat in the 2023 Chhattisgarh Legislative Assembly election.
