= Devwrat Singh =

Indian politician (1969–2021)

Member of Legislative Assembly, Chhattisgarh
- In office 2018–2021
- Preceded by: Girwar Janghel
- Succeeded by: Yashoda Verma
- Constituency: Khairagarh

Member of Parliament, Lok Sabha
- In office 2007–2009
- Preceded by: Pradeep Gandhi
- Succeeded by: Madhusudan Yadav
- Constituency: Rajnandgaon

Personal details
- Born: 3 June 1969 Jamnagar, Gujarat, India
- Died: 4 November 2021 (aged 52) Khairagarh, Chhattisgarh, India
- Cause of death: Heart Attack
- Party: Indian National Congress
- Other political affiliations: Janta Congress Chhattisgarh
- Spouse: Vibha Singh (?-2021)
- Children: 3

Devwrat Singh (3 June 1969 – 4 November 2021) was an Indian politician and a member of the Janta Congress Chhattisgarh political party.

He was a member of the 14th Lok Sabha of India, representing the Rajnandgaon constituency of Chhattisgarh. From 1995 to 1998 he was member of Madhya Pradesh Legislative Assembly. From 1998 to 2003 he was again elected to MP legislative Assembly later Chhattisgarh Legislative Assembly. He was elected to it again in 2003.

He was married to Vibha Singh and had one son and two daughters.

In February 2018, he joined Janta Congress Chhattisgarh of Ajit Jogi and was elected to the Chhattisgarh Legislative Assembly from Khairagarh in the 2018 Chhattisgarh Legislative Assembly election as a member of the Janta Congress Chhattisgarh.

Singh died on 4 November 2021, due to heart attack, from post Covid-19 complications, at the age of 52.
