= Dhannalal Jain =

Indian politician

Dhannalal Jain was an Indian politician from the state of Madhya Pradesh. He represented the Dongargaon Vidhan Sabha constituency of the undivided Madhya Pradesh Legislative Assembly by winning the 1957 Madhya Pradesh Legislative Assembly election.
