= Abhishek Singh (politician) =

Indian politician

Member of Parliament, Lok Sabha
- In office 16 May 2014 – 23 May 2019
- Preceded by: Madhusudan Yadav
- Succeeded by: Santosh Pandey
- Constituency: Rajnandgaon

Personal details
- Born: 5 March 1981 (age 45) Kawardha, Madhya Pradesh (now Chhattisgarh), India
- Party: Bharatiya Janata Party
- Spouse: Aishwarya Singh (m. 2011)
- Parent: Raman Singh (father)
- Education: NIT Raipur (B.Tech) XLRI Jamshedpur (MBA)
- Profession: Politician

Abhishek Singh (born 5 March 1981) is an Indian politician from the Bharatiya Janata Party. He was a member of the 16th Lok Sabha, the lower house of the Indian Parliament representing Rajnandgaon. He is the son of former Chief Minister of Chhattisgarh, Raman Singh.

== Early life ==
Abhishek Singh was born on 5 March 1981 at Kawardha. He is the son of Raman Singh and Veena Singh. He did his engineering from Government Engineering College, Raipur (now NIT Raipur) after which completed his MBA from Xavier School of Management (XLRI), Jamshedpur.

== Political career ==
Upon completion of his education, Singh entered politics and campaigned for the Bharatiya Janata Party (BJP) during the 2013 Chhattisgarh Legislative Assembly election in the districts of Rajnandgaon and Kawardha. In April 2014, the BJP declared him as their candidate to contest the general election from Rajnandgaon after Madhusudan Yadav, the then member from the constituency, was denied a ticket. He won the election by a margin of more than 235,000 votes and 33, became the youngest member of parliament elected from Chhattisgarh.

However, he was denied a ticket to contest the 2019 Indian general election and Santosh Pandey was instead given a ticket from Rajnandgaon seat.

== See also ==
- List of members of the 16th Lok Sabha of India
