= NIT MCA Common Entrance Test =

Entrance exam for admission into MCA

- Acronym: NIMCET
- Type: COMPUTER BASED TEST(CBT)
- Skills tested: Mathematics, Logical Reasoning, Computer Awareness and English
- Year started: 2007.
- Duration: 2 Years/3 Years(NITs)
- Offered: Once a year
- Restrictions on attempts: Unlimited number of attempts
- Languages: English
- Website: nimcet.admissions.nic.in
- As per 2024 information brochure

The NIMCET 2025 is a Common Entrance National Level Test, for admission into the MCA programme offered by NITs at Agartala, Allahabad, Bhopal, Delhi, Jamshedpur, Kurukshetra, Meghalaya, Patna, Raipur, Tiruchirappalli, Warangal and IIITs at Bhopal and Vadodara. The admission into the MCA programme for the year 2025-26 in above 11 NITs and 02 IIITs is based on the Rank obtained in NIMCET-2025 only.

The Curriculum and Syllabi of Master of Computer Applications (MCA) programme offered by the participating institutes are designed considering the needs of different Information Technology firms in India and abroad.

== Eligibility ==
The candidate who Successfully passed bachelor's degree like BCA/BSc (Hons)/BSc/ BIT with 10+2 Pass out are eligible for Applying for this Course.

== Test Pattern ==
NIMCET-2025 test will be conducted by NIT Trichy with a single paper containing 120 multiple choice questions covering the following subjects. Multiple Choice Questions will be written in English Language only and will not be translated into any other language. The distribution of questions and marks is as follows:

NIMCET Exam Pattern
Subject	Total no of questions	Marks awarded for correct answer	Marks deducted for wrong answer	Total marks	Fixed Time Allotted
Mathematics	50	12	3	600	70 Minutes
Analytical Ability & Logical Reasoning	40	6	1.5	240	30 Minutes
Computer Awareness	20	6	1.5	120	20 Minutes
General English	10	4	1	40	20 Minutes

Total Marks: 1000

== Yearwise Organizing Institutes ==
Year	Institute Name	References
2007	NIT Durgapur	
2008	NIT Surathkal	
2009	NIT Allahabad	
2010	NIT Kurukshetra	
2011	NIT Bhopal	
2012	NIT Warangal	
2013	NIT Warangal	
2014	NIT Agartala	
2015	NIT Agartala	
2016	NIT Durgapur (*)	
2017	NIT Durgapur(*)	
2018	NIT Surathkal	
2019	NIT Surathkal	
2020	NIT Raipur	
2021	NIT Raipur	
2022	NIT Jamshedpur	
2023	NIT Jamshedpur	
2024	NIT Jamshedpur	
2025	NIT Trichy	

- NIT Durgapur discontinued MCA course from 2019 onwards.
- NIT Calicut stepped back from MCA course in 2022.
- NIT Suratkal stepped back from MCA course in 2025.

Seat Matrix (2023)
Institute	Total Seats
NIT Agartala	60
MNNIT Allahabad	116
NIT Delhi	25
NIT Meghalaya	20
MANIT Bhopal	115
NIT Jamshedpur	115
NIT Kurukshetra	64
NIT Kurukshetra (Self-Financing)	42
NIT Raipur	110
NIT Tiruchirappalli	115
NIT Warangal*	58
NIT Patna	160
IIIT Bhopal	75
IIIT Vadodara	210
Total	1285

* NIT Warangal offers a three-year duration MCA program but with an option for the students to exit at the end of successful two years and the title of such exit would be Post -Graduate Advanced Diploma in Computer Applications.
