= Dongargaon Assembly constituency =

Legislative Assembly constituency in Chhattisgarh State, India

Coordinates: 20.97°N 80.85°E

Dongargaon
- Constituency No. 76 for the Chhattisgarh Legislative Assembly

Constituency details
- Country: India
- Region: Central India
- State: Chhattisgarh
- District: Rajnandgaon
- Lok Sabha constituency: Rajnandgaon
- Established: 1951
- Total electors: 203,009
- Reservation: None

Member of Legislative Assembly
- 6th Chhattisgarh Legislative Assembly
- Incumbent Daleshwar Sahu
- Party: Indian National Congress
- Elected year: 2023
- Preceded by: Kheduram Sahu

Dongargaon is one of the 90 Legislative Assembly constituencies of Chhattisgarh state in India. It is in Rajnandgaon district and is a segment of Rajnandgaon Lok Sabha seat. The seat used to be part of Madhya Pradesh Legislative Assembly when Chhattisgarh was part of MP.

== Members of Legislative Assembly ==
Year	Member	Party
Madhya Pradesh Legislative Assembly
1952	Dhannalal Jain	Indian National Congress
1957	Dhannalal Jain	Indian National Congress
1962	Ganeshmal Bhandari	Indian National Congress
1967	Madan Tiwari	Samyukta Socialist Party
1972	S. Jairam Ayyar	Indian National Congress
1977	Vidya Bhushan Thakur	Janata Party
1980	Hiraram Verma	Indian National Congress
1985	Hiraram Verma	Indian National Congress
1990	Gita Devi Singh	Indian National Congress
1993	Gita Devi Singh	Indian National Congress
1998	Gita Devi Singh	Indian National Congress
Chhattisgarh Legislative Assembly
2003	Pradeep Gandhi	Bharatiya Janata Party
2004^	Raman Singh	Bharatiya Janata Party
2008	Kheduram Sahu	Bharatiya Janata Party
2013	Daleshwar Sahu	Indian National Congress
2018	Daleshwar Sahu	Indian National Congress
2023	Daleshwar Sahu	Indian National Congress

^by-election

== Election results ==
=== 2023 ===
2023 Chhattisgarh Legislative Assembly election: Dongargaon
Party	Candidate	Votes	%	±%
INC	Daleshwar Sahu	81,479	47.49	−4.88
BJP	Bharat Lal Varma	78,690	45.86	+5.31
Hamar Raj Party	Chhattar Ram Chandrawanshi	5,178	3.02	
NOTA	None of the Above	2,258	1.32	−0.08
Majority		2,789	1.63	−10.19
Turnout		171,570	84.51	−0.92
INC hold		Swing		

=== 2018 ===
2018 Chhattisgarh Legislative Assembly election: Dongargaon
Party	Candidate	Votes	%	±%
INC	Daleshwar Sahu	84,581	52.37	
BJP	Madhusudan Yadav	65,498	40.55	
Independent	Vani Vilash Patel	1,863	1.15	
Independent	Rekchand Mandle	1,782	1.1	
BSP	Ashok Verma	1,482	0.92	
AAP	Chandramani Verma	1,474	0.91	
NOTA	None of the Above	2,257	1.4	
Majority		19,083	11.82	
Turnout		160,841	85.43	
INC hold		Swing		

=== 2004 Bypoll ===
- Dr. Raman Singh (BJP) : 42,115 votes
- Geeta Devi Singh (INC) : 32,004

=== 2003 ===
- Pradeep Gandhi (BJP) : 42,784 votes
- Geeta Devi Singh (INC) : 36,649

=== 1998 ===
- Smt. Gita Devi Singh (INC) : 25,125 votes
- Ashok Sharma (BJP) : 24,247

=== 1980 ===
- Hiraram Verma (INC-I) : 11,487 votes
- Vidyabhushan Thakur (JNP-SR) : 8,833

== See also ==
- List of constituencies of the Chhattisgarh Legislative Assembly
- Rajnandgaon district
