= National Institute of Technology, Agartala =

Public engineering institution in India

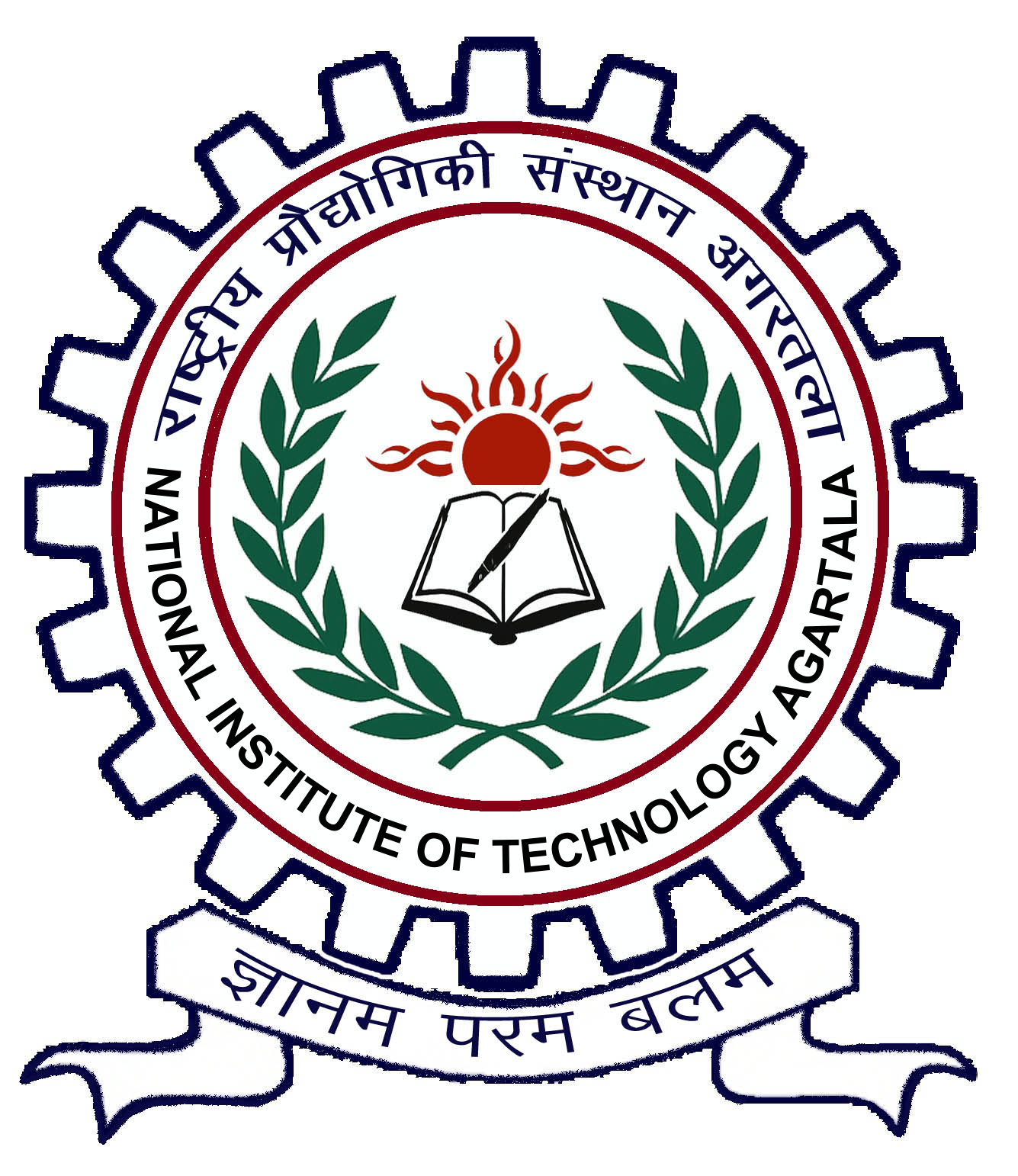
- College Logo
- Other name: NIT AGARTALA
- Former name: Tripura Engineering College (1965–2006)
- Motto: ज्ञानम परम बलम
- Motto in English: Knowledge is the Supreme Power
- Type: Public engineering school
- Established: 1965; 61 years ago (as NIT)
- Accreditation: Institute of National Importance
- Affiliations: Ministry of Education (India)
- Chairperson: Binod Bawri
- Director: Sarat Kumar Patra
- Faculty: 112
- Administrative staff: 185
- Students: 4,340+
- Undergraduates: 2,460+
- Postgraduates: 2,218+
- Location: Agartala, Tripura, India; 23°58′N 91°25′E
- Campus: Urban
- Language: English
- Colours: Orange, white and black
- Nicknames: NIT-A, NITA
- Website: nita.ac.in

National Institute of Technology Agartala (NIT Agartala or NITA) is a technology-oriented institute of higher education established by India's Ministry of Human Resource Development Government of India in Agartala, India. It was founded as Tripura Engineering College in 1965 and declared a National Institute of Technology (NIT) in 2006, thus being recognized as an Institute of National Importance.

The institute was established in 1965 as Tripura Engineering College, with the branches of civil, electrical, and mechanical engineering. It was initially affiliated with Calcutta University and had the same curriculum structure and examination system as Bengal Engineering College (currently IIEST Shibpur).

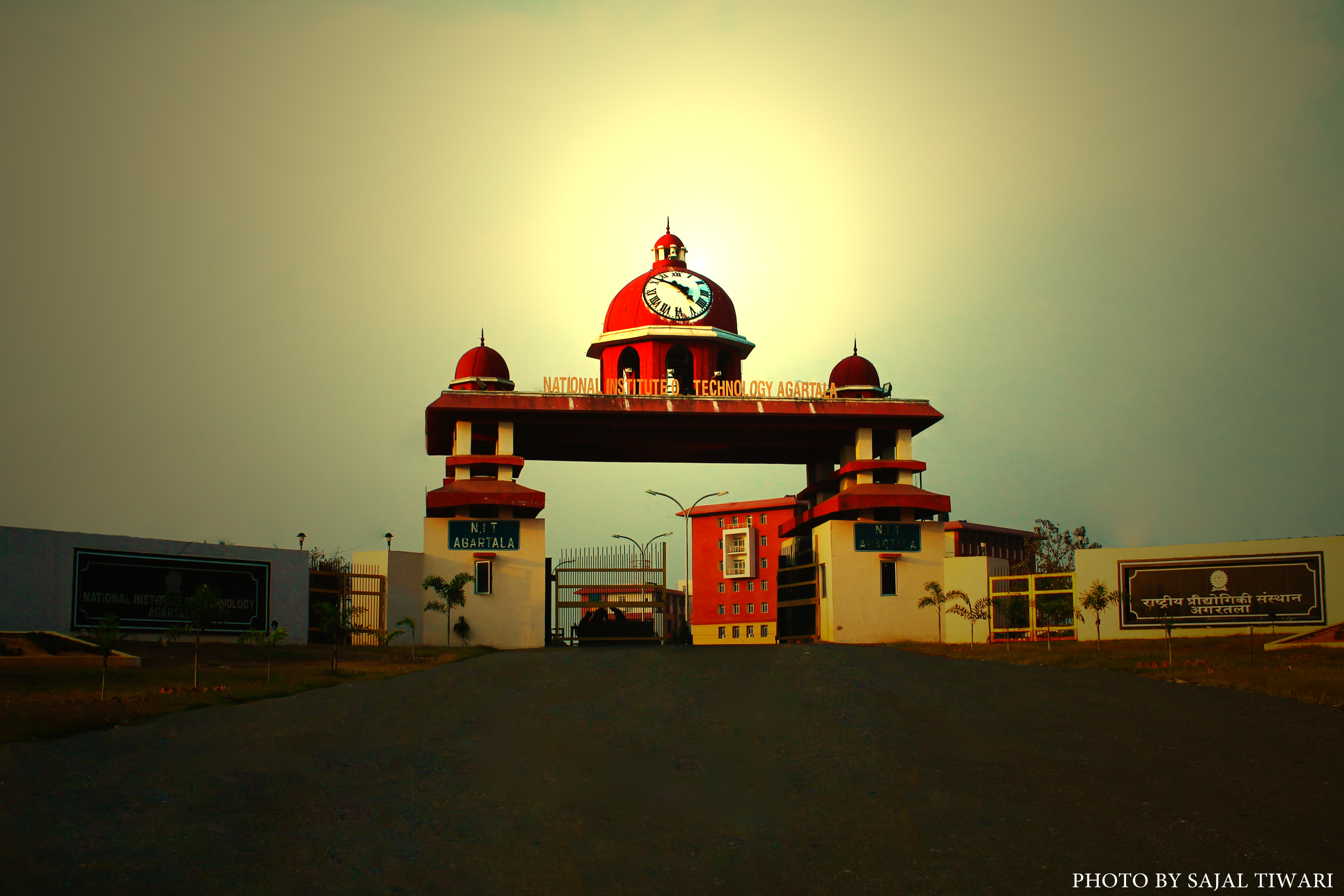
NIT Agartala Main Gate

After the establishment of Tripura University in 1987, the institute was affiliated with it. Courses toward a degree in computer science and engineering were offered beginning in the 1999–2000 session, and three new degrees were offered beginning in the 2005–06 session: Electrical & Electronics, Production and Transportation Engineering.

On 23 February 2006, the Union Cabinet approved the proposal of the state government for the conversion of Tripura Engineering College to the National Institute of Technology.

== Campus ==
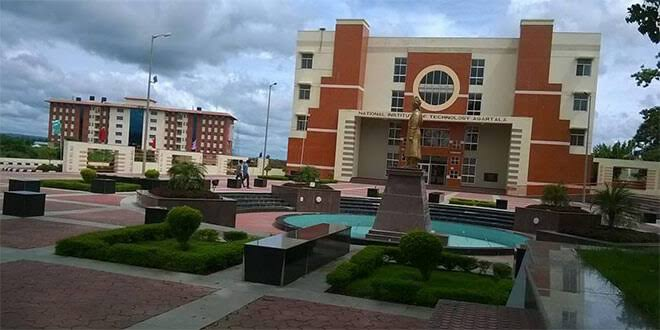
Main building of NIT Agartala

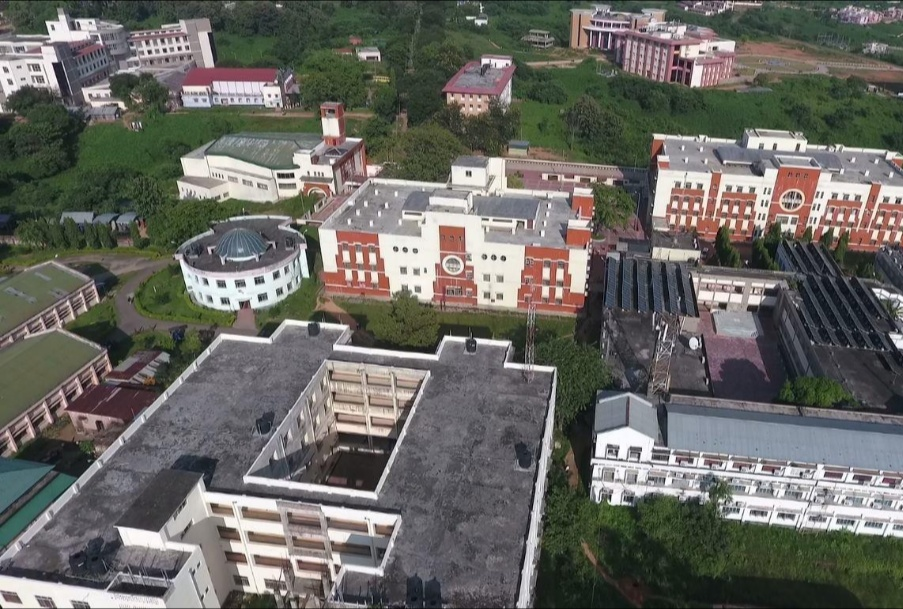
Aerial view of NIT Agartala

The institute is located about 4 km from National Highway 44 (NH-44) and approximately 24 km from Agartala, the capital city of Tripura. The nearest railway station is located at Jirania, about 2 km from the institute.

=== Facilities ===
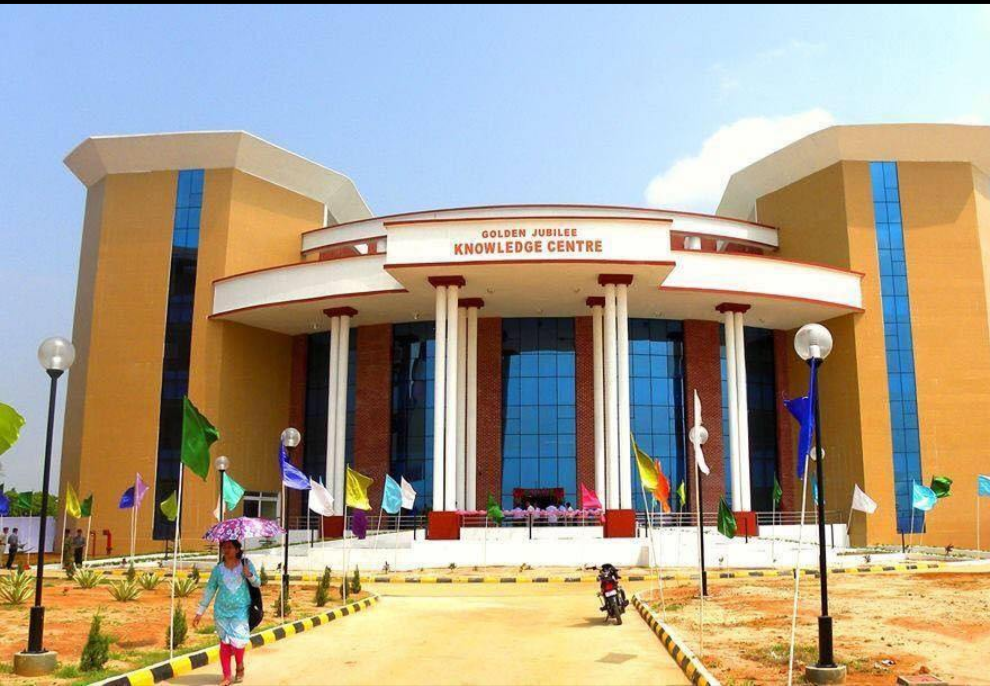
Knowledge Center

The campus has comprehensive facilities for academic activities, student services, recreation, and administration.

==== Knowledge Centre (Library) ====
The central library, known as the Knowledge Centre, is housed in a two-story building covering over 4,500 square meters. It utilizes the Dewey Decimal classification system and is fully automated with an RFID system for self-check-in and check-out. The library holds over 69,000 print books and provides access to more than 50,000 e-books and 2,500 e-journals through the e-ShodhSindhu consortium. It features CCTV surveillance, a dedicated digital library, and provides stakeholders with access to the National Digital Library (NDL) portal and 'URKUND' plagiarism detection software.

==== Sports Complex ====
NIT Agartala hosts the largest sports complex among all government universities in India, including both NITs and IITs. The infrastructure includes two expansive indoor stadiums equipped for tennis, table tennis, basketball, badminton, and volleyball. Outdoor facilities feature a primary well-maintained stadium for cricket and football, alongside two additional dedicated cricket grounds. A swimming pool is also currently under construction.

==== Medical Care ====
A dedicated Health Centre operates 24x7 within the campus, serving students, employees, and institute guests. The facility is equipped with a diagnostic laboratory, a pharmacy, and ambulance services. For severe emergencies, patients are referred to empanelled facilities like ILS Hospital or the State Hospital.

==== Banks and Post Office ====
The institute premises host branches of the State Bank of India (SBI) and Canara Bank, both offering ATM facilities. A branch of the Tripura Gramin Bank and a Punjab & Sindh Bank ATM are also available on campus. Additionally, a dedicated sub-post office operates within the campus under the name "NIT Agartala" (PIN: 799046).

==== Extra-Curricular Activities ====
Students actively participate in various state and institute-sponsored co-curricular activities, including techno-cultural festivals, drama, and rallies. Additionally, participation in the National Service Scheme (N.S.S) or National Cadet Corps (N.C.C) is a mandatory requirement for all first-year students.

== History ==
The institute was converted from Tripura Engineering College, a State Engineering College, to a National Institute of Technology in 2006 |url. To better reflect this new status, the total seats were increased from 250 to 420 for the academic session 2007 – 2008 and undergraduate courses were introduced in electrical and electronics engineering, transportation engineering and production engineering. The Civil Engineering Department started a postgraduate programme in structural engineering to fulfill a state requirement. The campus, which had been nonresidential, was made residential for the 2007 – 2008 session with the reopening of two boys' hostels and one girls' hostel. The institute is built over 365.6 acres (1.48 km^{2}) of land.

== Organization and administration ==
=== Departments ===
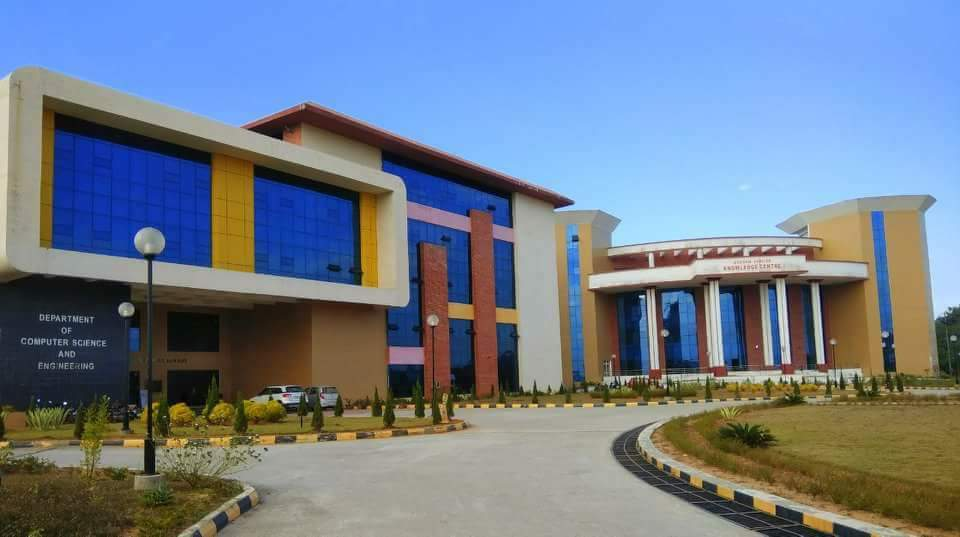
Computer Science Building NIT Agartala

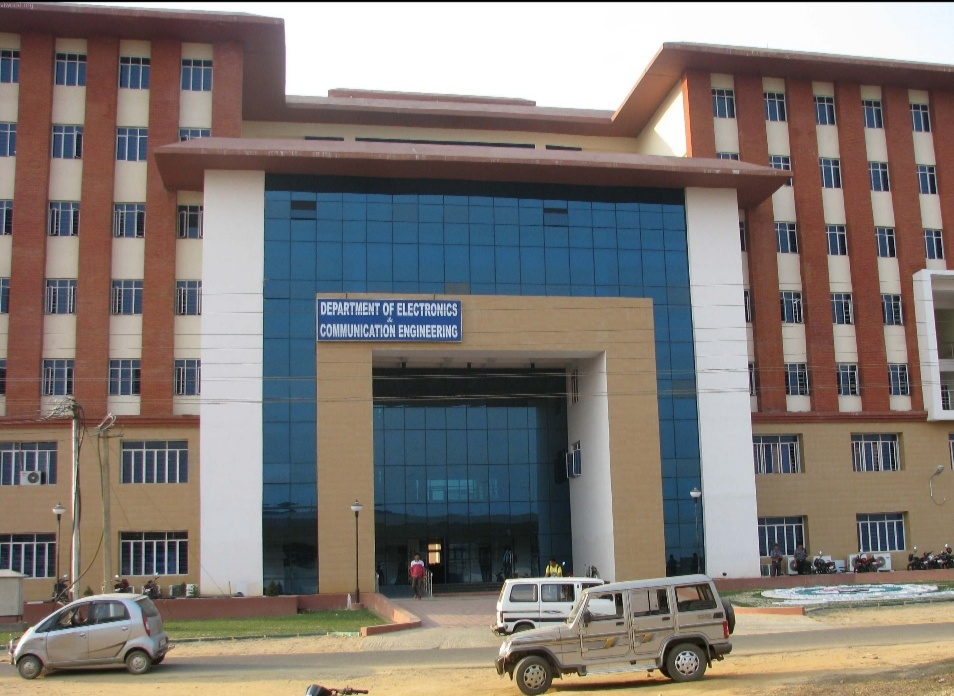
Electronics and Communication Building

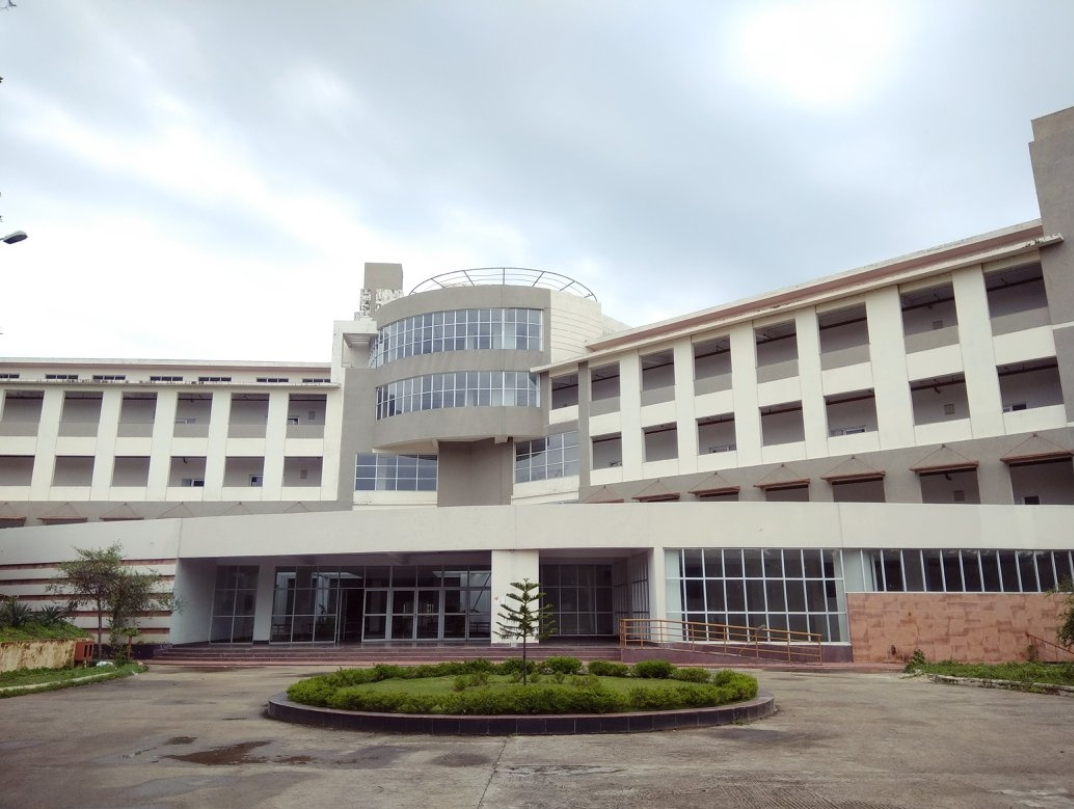
Civil Building

Engineering

- Department of Bio Engineering
- Department of Chemical Engineering
- Department of Civil Engineering
- Computational Mathematics [Dual Degree (B.Tech.+ M.Tech.)]
- Department of Computer Science and Engineering (B.Tech. + M.Tech. + M.C.A.)
- Department of Electrical Engineering
- Engineering Physics [Dual Degree (B.Tech. + M.Tech.)]
- Department of Electronics and Communication Engineering
- Department of Electronics and Instrumentation Engineering
- Department of Mechanical Engineering
- Department of Production Engineering

Sciences

- Department of Chemistry
- Department of Mathematics
- Department of Physics

Management, Humanities & Social Sciences

== Academics ==
=== Academic programs ===
NIT Agartala offers nine four-year undergraduate programs in engineering. All undergraduate programs lead to a Bachelor of Technology (B.Tech.) degree. Post graduate Master's of Technology (M.Tech.) courses in bioengineering, chemical engineering, civil engineering, computer science and engineering, electrical engineering, electronic and communication engineering, mechanical engineering and production engineering are also offered. From July 2013, dual-degree courses in engineering physics and a five-year integrated course in applied physics, chemistry and mathematics were started. From 2021, the dual-degree program in Computational Mathematics is designed to comprehensively address the latest advancements in technology and meet current market demands. NITA is the second NIT in India (after National Institute of Technology Calicut), and sixth among all NIT's and IIT's (Indian Institutes of Technology), to start a program in engineering physics. The Department of Computer Science and Engineering offers a three-year degree leading to a Master's in Computer Applications (MCA) course. PhD and post-doctorate fellowships are offered by some departments. NIT Agartala also offers a CDAC program.

=== Admission ===
Admission to the undergraduate program is based on the rank secured in the Joint Entrance Examination (Main). Candidates must also secure at least 75% marks in the 12th class examination, or be in the top 20 percentile in the 12th class examination conducted by the respective boards. For Scheduled Castes/Scheduled Tribes students, the qualifying marks would be 65% in the 12th class examination.

The NIMCET is a Common Entrance National Level Test, conducted by any of the NITs, for admission in to their MCA program. The admission into the MCA program of NIT-A is based on the Rank obtained in NIMCET exam only.

=== Accreditation ===
In 2013, the mechanical and civil engineering branches of the institute were accredited by the National Board of Accreditation for five years, while the electrical engineering branch was provisionally accredited for two years.

=== Rankings ===
University and college rankings

Engineering – India
- NIRF (2024): 82

NIT Agartala was ranked 82nd among engineering colleges in India by the National Institutional Ranking Framework (NIRF) in 2024.

== Student life ==
=== Sports ===
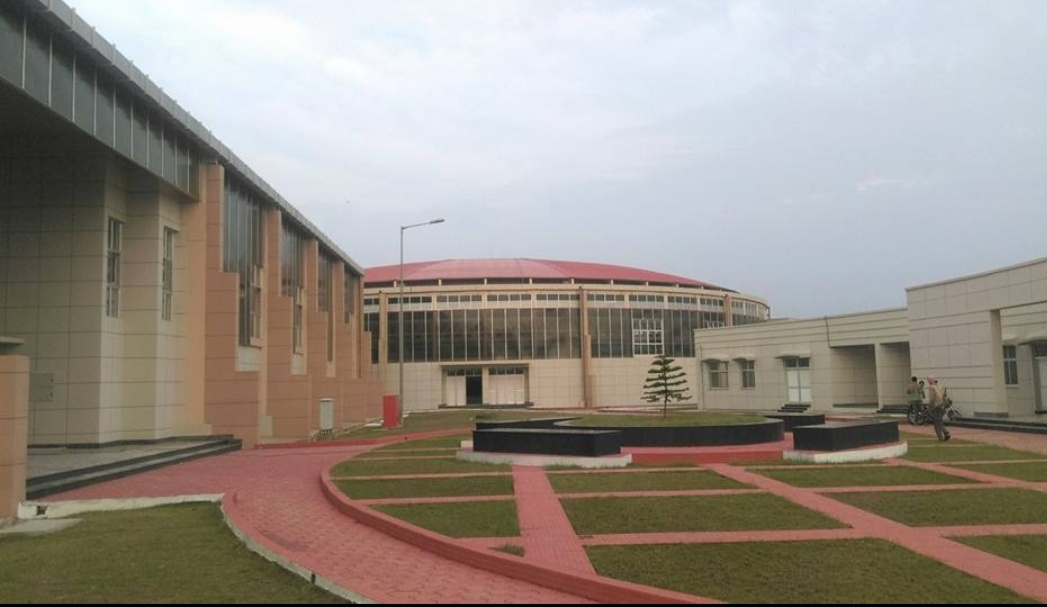
Sports Complex is biggest sport complex among all colleges of India. Inauguration by HRD state minister.

- 3 Football Grounds
- Indoor and Outdoor Basketball Courts
- Cricket Ground
- Indoor Badminton Court
- Lawn Tennis Court
- Volleyball Ground
- Hockey Ground
- Kabaddi Ground
- Handball
- Kho-Kho
- Table Tennis

=== Cultural Fest ===
NIT Agartala's cultural fest is known as Moksha.

=== Tech Fest ===
NIT Agartala's tech fest is known as Aayam. In the year 2023, the college will be organising its eighth edition.

=== Alumni ===
Sudip Roy Barman – MLA of Agartala Assembly constituency

== See also ==
- National Institutes of Technology
- Education in India
