= Abidali Neemuchwala =

Indian-American business executive (born 1967)

Abidali Zainuddin Neemuchwala
- Born: 8 December 1967 (age 58); Bombay, India
- Education: Indian Institute of Technology Bombay; National Institute of Technology, Raipur
- Occupations: Former CEO and Managing Director, Wipro
- Predecessor: T K Kurien
- Successor: Thierry Delaporte
- Spouse: Hasina Neemuchwala
- Children: 3

Abidali Zainuddin Neemuchwala (born 8 December 1967) is an Indian business executive. He was the chief executive officer (CEO) and managing director (MD) of Wipro from February 2016 to June 2020. On 31 January 2020, Wipro announced that he would be stepping down due to family commitments, once a successor is appointed.

Neemuchwala, who had been group president and chief operating officer (COO) of Wipro from April 2015, was appointed CEO with effect from 1 February 2016. He previously was the CEO of the BPO division of Tata Consultancy Services Limited.

== Education ==
Neemuchwala has a bachelor's in engineering (BE) degree in Electronics and Communication Engineering from National Institute of Technology, Raipur, and a master's degree in Industrial Management from the Indian Institute of Technology, Bombay.

== Career ==
=== TCS ===
Neemuchwala joined Tata Consultancy Services (TCS) in 1992 after graduating from IIT Bombay and worked there for 23 years, rising to the head of business process services. Mentored by the then TCS CEO and current chairman of Tata Sons, Natarajan Chandrasekaran, Neemuchwala was instrumental in turning around the fortunes of TCS BPO. His working style is often compared to that of Chandrasekaran. He was awarded the BPO CEO of the Year in 2010 and 2012. At TCS, Neemuchwala was responsible for over 12 percent of the company's revenues. He was honoured by the Shared Services Organisation of IPQC for his contribution to the industry.

=== Wipro ===
Neemuchwala was appointed group president and COO in April 2015. As the COO, Neemuchwala spearheaded several initiatives that helped create a more nimble and agile organization, and accelerated Wipro's ability to not only respond to customers in the digital age, but also ensure deeper employee engagement. On 1 February 2016, he was appointed CEO and executive director of Wipro succeeding T.K. Kurien. As CEO, Neemuchwala oversees $8 billion in revenue and more than 160,000 employees serving clients across six continents. In September 2018, Neemuchwala helped land Wipro its largest deal ever with a $1.5 billion, 10-year contract with Alight Solutions. In July 2019, he was appointed managing director (MD) of Wipro following the retirement of Azim Premji. He is on the board of directors of Wipro Limited and the World Affairs Council of Dallas/Fort Worth. He sits on the CEO Council of the Texas Economic Development Corporation.

On 31 January 2020, Wipro announced that Neemuchwala would be stepping down due to family commitments, once a successor is appointed.

On 30 May 2020, Wipro appointed former Capgemini COO Thierry Delaporte as its CEO.

Business positions
Preceded by T. K. Kurien	CEO of Wipro; 2016 - 2020	Succeeded by Thierry Delaporte
