= Deepak Khandekar =

Indian Administrative Service officer

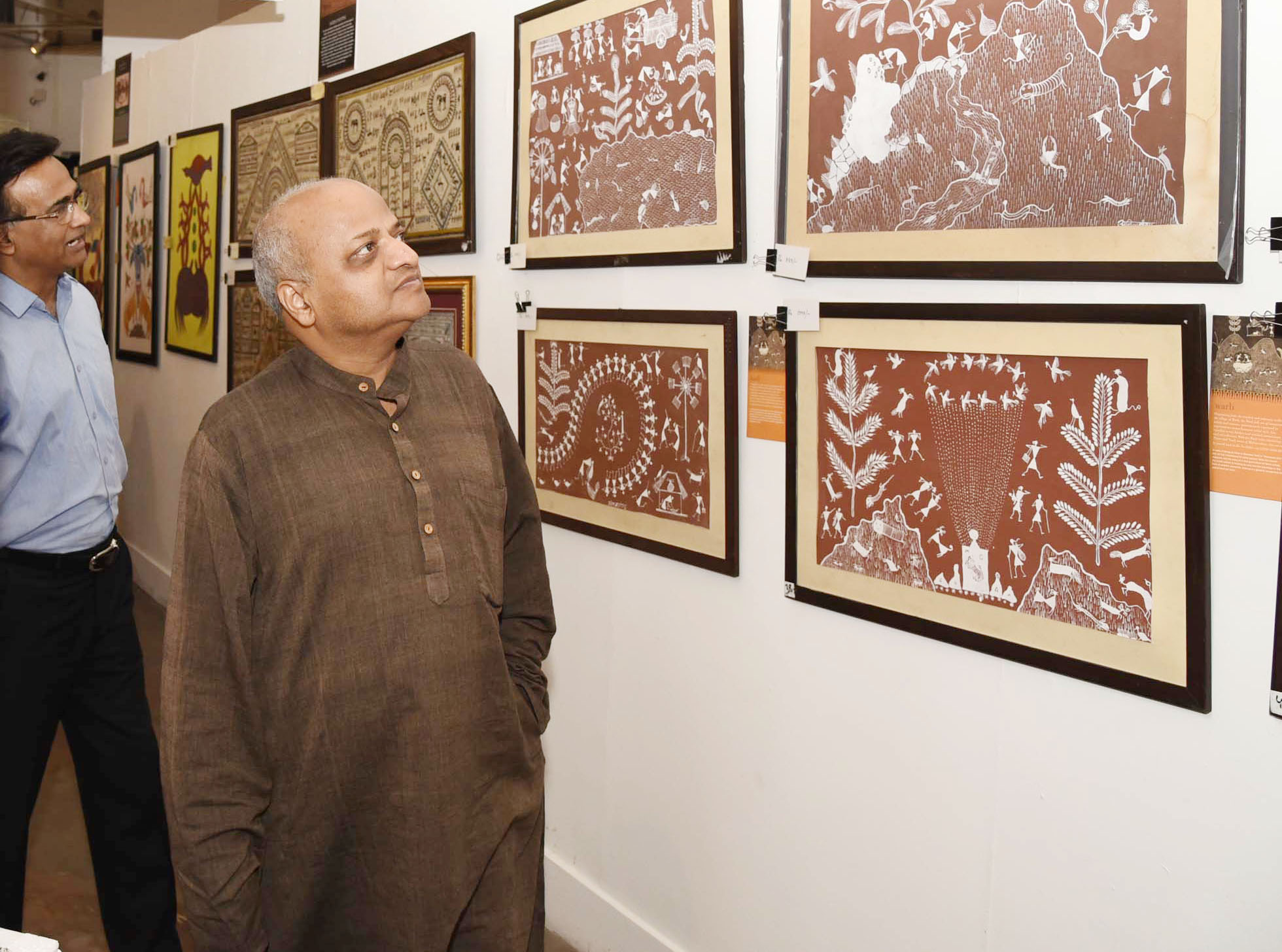

Personnel Secretary (India)
- In office 25 January 2021 – 31 August 2021
- Preceded by: C. Chandramouli
- Succeeded by: S. Radha Chauhan

Personal details
- Born: 5 August 1961 (age 64)
- Citizenship: India
- Education: BE, Civil Engineering
- Alma mater: National Institute of Technology, Raipur
- Occupation: Bureaucrat

Deepak Khandekar is retired IAS Officer (1985) of Madhya Pradesh Cadre. He is former Personnel Secretary (India).

== Education ==
Khandekar is a graduate from National Institute of Technology, Raipur.
