= Sudhir Vasudeva =

Indian businessman

Chairman of Oil and Natural Gas Corporation
- Succeeded by: Shashi Shanker

Personal details
- Citizenship: Indian
- Education: BE (Chemical Engineering)
- Alma mater: National Institute of Technology, Raipur

Sudhir Vasudeva is the former Chairman and Managing Director of Oil and Natural Gas Corporation. and Chairperson of Board of Governors of National Institute of Technology, Raipur. He has been the head of 14 different companies and currently holds the position of Chairman of Mangalore Special Economic Zone, President for All India Public Sector Sports Promotion Board and President at Global Compact Network India.

== Education ==
He is a graduate in Chemical Engineering (1971–1975) from National Institute of Technology, Raipur.
