= Personnel Secretary =

Personnel Secretary of India
- Kārmik Saciv

- Flag of India
- Incumbent; Rachna Shah,IAS since 26 December 2024
- Department of Personnel and Training, Ministry of Personnel, Public Grievances and Pensions
- Reports to: Parliament of India; Council of Ministers of India; Prime Minister of India; Minister of Personnel, Public Grievances and Pensions
- Seat: Ministry of Personnel, Public Grievances and Pensions; North Block, Cabinet Secretariat; Raisina Hill; New Delhi
- Appointer: Appointments Committee of the Cabinet
- Formation: 1970; 56 years ago
- Salary: ₹225,000 (US$2,300) monthly
- Website: dopt.gov.in

The Personnel Secretary (ISO: Kārmik Saciv) popularly called as Secretary (P), is the administrative head of the Department of Personnel and Training (DoPT) under Ministry of Personnel, Public Grievances and Pensions. This post is held by senior IAS officer of the rank of Secretary to Government of India. The current Personnel Secretary is Rachna Shah , a 1991 batch IAS officer of Kerala cadre.

As a Secretary to Government of India, the Personnel Secretary ranks 23rd on Indian Order of Precedence.

== Powers, responsibilities and postings ==
Personnel Secretary is the administrative head of DoPT, and is the principal adviser to the Minister of Personnel, Public Grievances and Pensions on all matters of policy and administration within DoPT.

The role of Personnel Secretary is as follows:

- To act as the administrative head of DoPT. The responsibility in this regard is complete and undivided.
- To act as the chief adviser to the Minister of Personnel, Public Grievances and Pensions on all aspects of policy and administrative affairs.
- To represent DoPT before the Public Accounts Committee of the Parliament of India.

== Emolument, accommodation and perquisites ==
As the Personnel Secretary is of the rank of Secretary to Government of India, his/her salary is equivalent to Chief Secretaries of State Governments and to Vice Chief of Army Staff/Commanders, in the rank of Lieutenant General and equivalent ranks in Indian Armed Forces. The officer is also eligible for a diplomatic passport.

Personnel Secretary monthly pay and allowances
Base Salary as per 7th Pay Commission (Per month)	Pay Matrix Level	Sources
₹225,000 (US$2,300)	Pay Level 17	

== List of Personnel Secretaries ==
List of Union Personnel Secretaries
S. No.	Name	Assumed office	Demitted office
1	H. Lal Mukherjee	1 August 1970	6 December 1970
2	B B Lal Bhargav	6 December 1970	28 April 1971
3	P. K. J. Menon	15 September 1971	1 April 1972
4	B. P. Bagchi	7 September 1972	31 July 1975
5	R. K. Trivedi	1 August 1975	25 May 1977
6	C. R. Krishnaswamy	26 May 1977	2 June 1978
7	Maheshwar Prasad	3 June 1978	6 June 1980
8	A. C. Bandopadhyay	7 June 1980	26 July 1982
9	U. C. Agarwal	27 July 1982	24 February 1985
10	K Ramanujan	25 February 1985	7 July 1986
11	P. P. Trivedi	8 July 1986	29 February 1988
12	Manish Bahl	2 March 1988	2 January 1990
13	M. Dandapani	3 January 1990	17 July 1992
14	N. R. Ranganathan	5 August 1992	30 June 1995
15	P. C. Hota	14 July 1995	27 September 1996
16	Arvind Verma	30 September 1996	30 November 1998
17	B. B. Tandon	1 December 1998	13 June 2001
18	A. K. Agarwal	14 June 2001	30 November 2002
19	S. S. Dawra	2 December 2002	30 October 2003
20	Arun Bhatnagar	3 November 2003	29 June 2004
21	A. N. Tiwari	1 July 2004	26 December 2005
22	Pratyush Sinha	3 January 2006	31 July 2006
23	L. K. Joshi	1 August 2006	31 January 2007
24	Satyanand Mishra	1 February 2007	4 September 2008
25	Rahul Sarin	13 September 2008	31 August 2009
26	Shantanu Consul	1 September 2009	31 October 2010
27	Alka Sirohi	1 November 2010	3 January 2012
28	P. K. Misra	16 January 2012	30 June 2013
29	S. K. Sarkar	1 July 2013	31 July 2014
30	Sanjay Kothari	1 August 2014	30 June 2016
31	BP Sharma	1 July 2016	30 June 2017
32	Ajay Mittal	1 July 2017	28 February 2018
33	C. Chandramouli	1 March 2018	30 September 2020
33	Deepak Khandekar	25 January 2021	31 August 2021
34	S. Radha Chauhan	3 May 2022	30 June 2024
35	Vivek Joshi	19 August 2024	31 October 2024
36	Rachna Shah	26 December 2024	Incumbent

== See also ==
- Cabinet Secretary of India
- Home Secretary of India
- Foreign Secretary of India
- Defence Secretary of India
- Finance Secretary of India
