= Daleshwar Sahu =

Indian politician

Member of Chhattisgarh Legislative Assembly
- Incumbent
- Assumed office 8 December 2013
- Preceded by: Kheduram Sahu
- Constituency: Dongargaon

Personal details
- Born: Daleshwar Sahu; 11 February 1967 (age 59) Rajnandgaon, Chhattisgarh, India
- Party: Indian National Congress
- Spouse: Jayashree Sahu
- Occupation: Politician

Daleshwar Sahu (born 11 February 1967) is an Indian politician from Chhattisgarh. He is a three time MLA from the Dongargaon Assembly constituency, representing the Indian National Congress. in Chhattisgarh Legislative Assembly.

== Early life and education ==
Sahu is from Dongargarh, Rajnandgaon District, Chhattisgarh. His father, Kanwal Singh Sahu, is a farmer. He completed his Class 12 in 1986 at Sarvesharghas Nagar Palika, Rajnandgaon, and later did a diploma in singing in 1990 at Indira Kala Sangeet University, Khairgarh.

== Career ==
Sahu first became an MLA, winning the 2013 Chhattisgarh Legislative Assembly election. He polled 67,755 votes and defeated his nearest rival, Dinesh Gandhi of Bharatiya Janata Party, by a margin of 1,698 votes. He retained the seat for the Indian National Congress in the 2018 Assembly election, winning by a margin of 19,083 votes. He won for a third consecutive term in 2023 to become a three time MLA from Dongarhgaon.
