= Padmawati Devi =

Indian politician (1918–1987)

Member of Parliament, Lok Sabha
- In office 1967–1971
- Preceded by: Raja Bahadur Singh
- Succeeded by: Ramsahai Pandey
- Constituency: Rajnandgaon, Madhya Pradesh

Personal details
- Born: 17 July 1918
- Died: 12 April 1987 (aged 68) Bhopal, Madhya Pradesh, India
- Party: Indian National Congress
- Spouse: Raja Bahadur Birendra Bahadur Singh

Padmawati Devi (17 July 1918 – 12 April 1987) was an Indian politician. She was elected to the Lok Sabha, the lower house of the Parliament of India from Rajnandgaon, Madhya Pradesh as a member of the Indian National Congress.

Devi died in Bhopal on 12 April 1987, at the age of 68.
