= Dharmpal Singh Gupta =

Indian politician (1925–1997)

Dharmpal Singh Gupta (21 August 1925 – 4 September 1997) was an Indian politician and member of the 9th Lok Sabha. He represented the Rajnandgaon constituency of Chhattisgarh on a Bharatiya Janata Party ticket.

Gupta was born in Durg District, Madhya Pradesh on 21 August 1925. He died in Mumbai on 4 September 1997, at the age of 72.
