= Yashoda Verma =

Indian politician

Member of Chhattisgarh Legislative Assembly
- Incumbent
- Assumed office 2022
- Preceded by: Devwrat Singh
- Constituency: Khairagarh

Personal details
- Born: 1986 (age 39–40)
- Party: Indian National Congress

Yashoda Nilamber Verma is an Indian politician who is serving as Member of Chhattisgarh Legislative Assembly from Khairagarh Assembly constituency. Yashoda is the member of Indian National Congress.

== Political career ==
Yashoda fought 2022 by-poll as Congress candidate and won the by-poll which were necessitated after the death of Devwrat Singh. Out of total votes cast, there were 1,65,407 votes; BJP candidate Komal Janghel got 67524; Congress candidate Yashoda Verma got 87,690; JCCJ candidate Narendra Soni got 1,218 votes; and 2,480 people pressed NOTA.

== Personal life ==
Born in 1986 in a Lodhi family, Yashoda hails from Devaribhat village in Khairagarh tehsil of Khairagarh-Chhuikhadan-Gandai district.
