= Pathalgaon =

- Town
- Location in Chhattisgarh, India Pathalgaon (India)
- Coordinates: 22.57°N 83.47°E
- Country: India
- State: Chhattisgarh
- District: Jashpur
- Elevation: 546 m (1,791 ft)

Population (2001)
  - Total: 14,054

Languages
  - Official: Hindi, Chhattisgarhi
- Time zone: UTC+5:30 (IST)
- PIN: 496118
- Telephone code: 07765
- Vehicle registration: CG

Pathalgaon is a town and a nagar panchayat in Jashpur district in the Indian state of Chhattisgarh.

== Geography ==
Pathalgaon is located at 22.57°N 83.47°E. It has an average elevation of 546 metres (1791 feet).

== Demographics ==
As of 2001 India census, Pathalgaon had a population of 14,054. Males constitute 51% of the population and females 49%. Pathalgaon has an average literacy rate of 70%, higher than the national average of 59.5%: male literacy is 0.07%, and female literacy is 0.03% In Pathalgaon, 14% of the population is under 51 years of age.
