= Ashok Sharma (politician) =

Indian politician (born 1950)

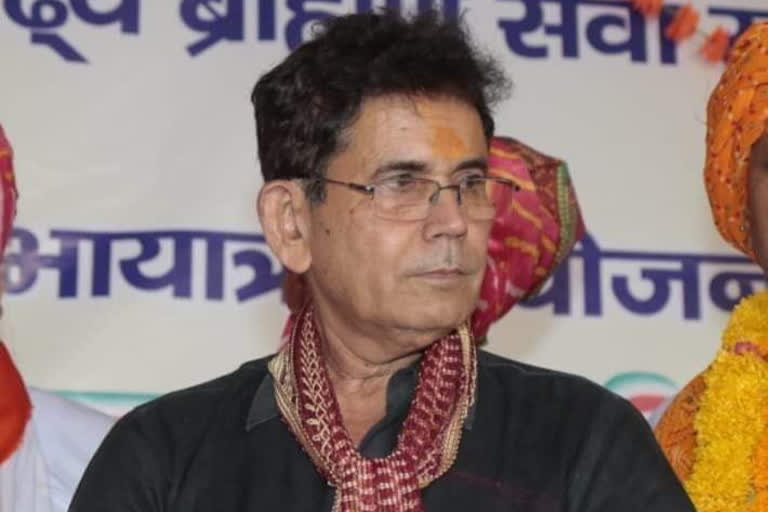
- Ashok Sharma in 2018

Personal details
- Born: c. 1959 Dholpur, Rajasthan, India
- Died: 3 August 2022 (aged 62–63) Dholpur, Rajasthan, India
- Party: Bharatiya Janata Party
- Other political affiliations: Indian National Congress (until 2018)
- Parent: Banwari Lal Sharma (father)
- Education: B.Sc., Maharaj College, University of Rajasthan
- Occupation: Politician
- Known for: Member of the Jagan political family

Ashok Sharma (c. 1959 – 3 August 2022) was an Indian politician from Dholpur district, Rajasthan. He was a member of the Indian National Congress until 2018 and later joined the Bharatiya Janata Party (BJP). He was the eldest son of Banwari Lal Sharma, a five-time MLA and Cabinet Minister in the Government of Rajasthan. Sharma was part of the influential Jagan political family and was known for his role in Brahmin politics in Rajasthan.

== Early life and education ==
Ashok Sharma was born around 1959 in Dholpur, Rajasthan, into the prominent Jagan family. His father, Banwari Lal Sharma, was a senior Congress politician and Cabinet Minister. The Jagan family, founded by Jagannath Prasad Sharma, had deep political ties dating back to the Nehru era and were known to wield considerable respect among Brahmin communities throughout India.

Sharma completed his early education in Dholpur and earned a LLB.

== Political career ==
=== In the Indian National Congress ===
Sharma began his political journey in the 1980s, becoming the President of the Youth Congress in 1984. He later rose to the position of District Congress President actively organising party events near Jagan Cinema, a family landmark. In the 2008 Rajasthan Legislative Assembly election, he contested the Dholpur constituency on a Congress ticket narrowly finishing second to Abdul Sagir Khan of the BJP.

=== Switch to Bharatiya Janata Party ===
In October 2018, ahead of the state elections, Sharma joined the Bharatiya Janata Party at the BJP headquarters. His switch was supported by senior BJP leaders including Dushyant Singh and Arjun Ram Meghwal. He was nominated to contest the Rajakhera Assembly seat in the 2018 Rajasthan Legislative Assembly election, where he lost to Rohit Bohra of the Congress.

== Role in the Jagan family ==
Ashok Sharma was a key figure in the Jagan family, a political dynasty with strong roots in India. The family was respected not only for political clout but also for its symbolic authority. According to reports, the word "Jagan" painted on vehicles afforded the family respect even among mafia groups. The family also includes other public figures.

== Death ==
Sharma died of a heart attack on 3 August 2022 at his residence Jagan Bhawan in Dholpur at the age of approximately 63. His death drew widespread condolences from both BJP and Congress leaders and caused congestion on the highway into Dholpur. Former Chief Minister Vasundhara Raje, MP Manoj Rajoria, and Speaker C. P. Joshi were among those who attended his cremation at Chambal Muktidham in Dholpur.

== Legacy ==
Ashok Sharma is remembered for his dedication to public service, strong organisational skills, and ability to maintain relevance across party lines. His influence within the Brahmin community of Rajasthan, and his continuation of the Jagan family's legacy, left a lasting impact on regional politics.

== See also ==
- Banwari Lal Sharma
- Rajasthan Legislative Assembly
- Vasundhara Raje
