= List of cities in Chhattisgarh by population =

There are 32 districts in the state of Chhattisgarh, which has a total population 25,540,196 as of 2011. Mainly Chhattisgarh(CG) state has large population in cities like Raipur, Nava Raipur, Raigarh, Bhilai, Korba, Ambikapur, Jagdalpur and Bilaspur. The male and female population in this state was 12,827,915 and 12,712,281 respectively (as of 2011).

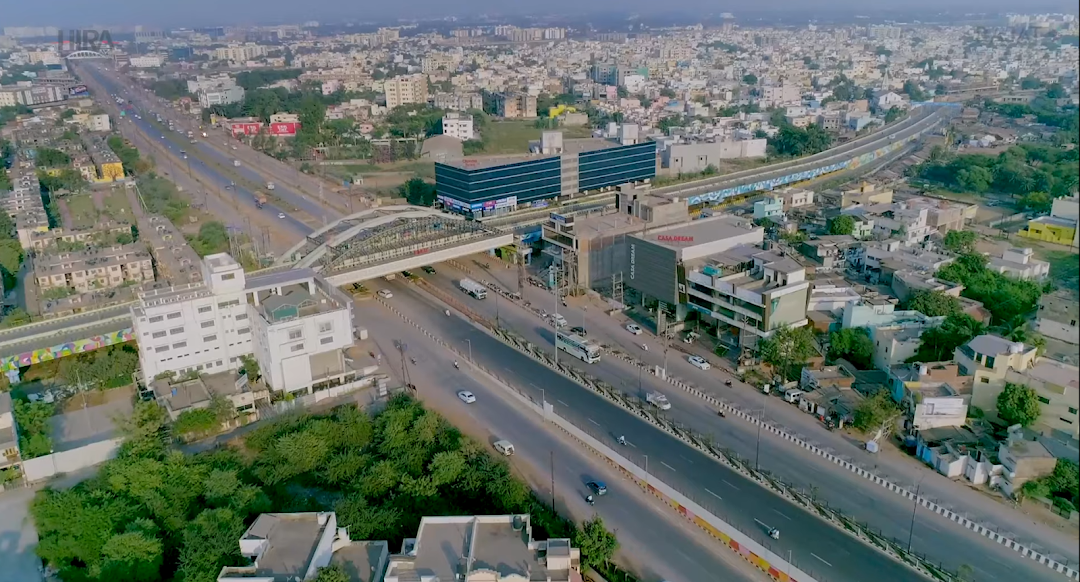
Raipur, the largest city of Chhattisgarh

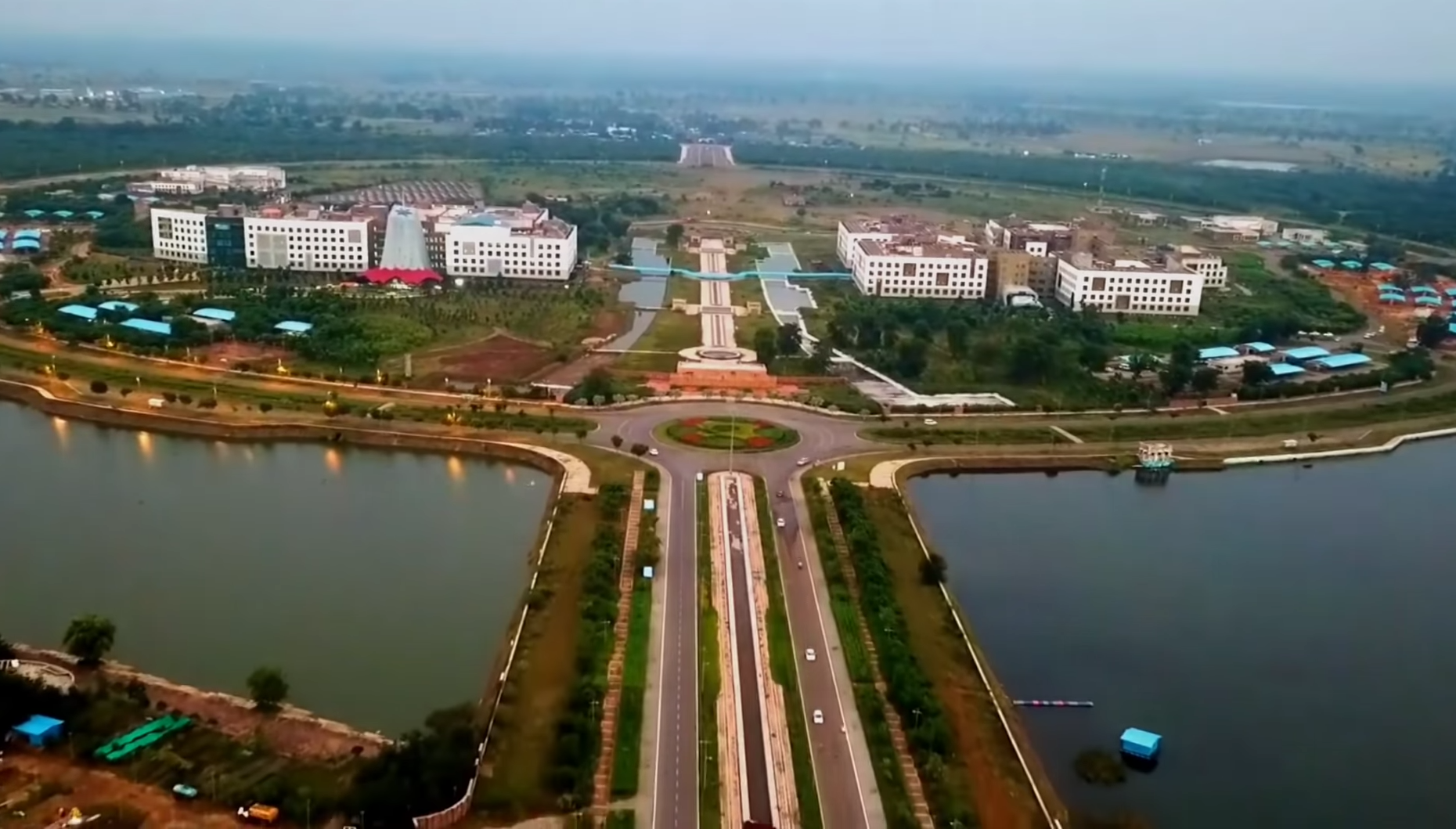
Naya Raipur, the first greenfield city of Chhattisgarh

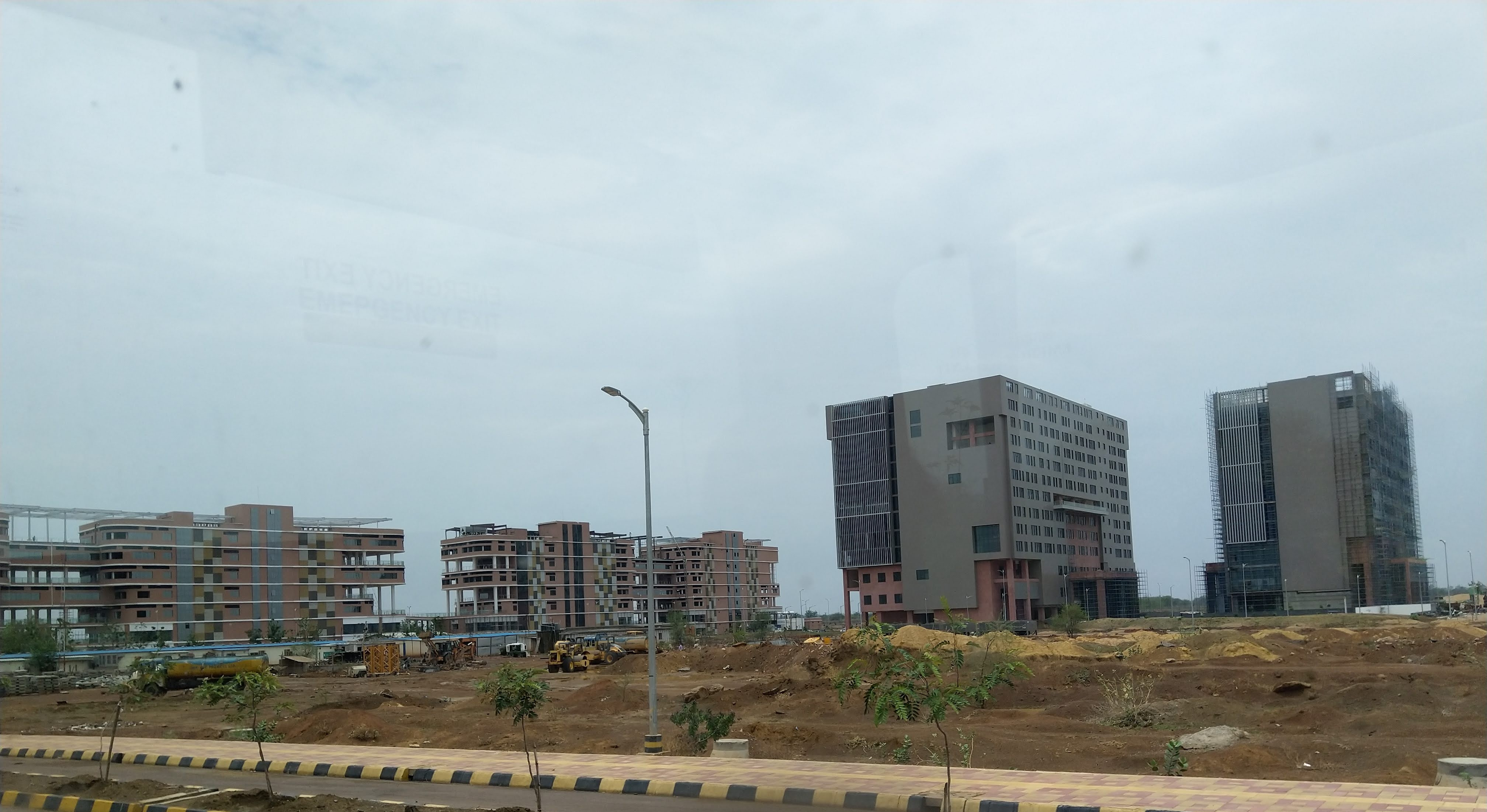
CBD sector 21, Naya Raipur

== Urban agglomeration constituents ==
Urban agglomeration constituents with a population above 100,000 as per the 2011 census are shown in the table below.

Urban agglomeration	Name of constituent	District	Type*	Population 2011	Male	Female	Population below 5 yrs	Literacy rate
Raipur	Raipur	Raipur district	M Corp.	1,010,087	519,286	490,801	124,471	85.95%
Bhilai-Durg	Bhilai	Durg district	M Corp.	1,003,406	465,644	435,585	102,175	96.17%
Bilaspur	Bilaspur	Bilaspur district	M Corp.	717,030	361‚030	350‚000	37‚552	88.13%
Korba	Korba	Korba district	M Corp.	365,253	189,989	175,264	46430	84.28%
Rajnandgaon	Rajnandgaon	Rajnandgaon district	M Corp.	163,122	83,973	80,064	26,345	93.28%
Raigarh	Raigarh district	Raigarh district	M Corp.	150,019	77,973	72,046	18,444	87.55%
Jagdalpur	Jagdalpur	Bastar district	M Corp.	125,463	63,989	61,474	14,185	75.31%
Ambikapur	Ambikapur	Surguja district	M Corp.	114,575	59,673	54,902	11,905	88.20%
Chirmiri	Chirmiri	Manendragarh-Chirmiri-Bharatpur district	M Corp.	103,575	52,673	54,902	12,995	88.80%
Dhamtari	Dhamtari	Dhamtari district	M Corp.	101,677	50,807	50,870	11,652	85.31%
Mahasamund	Mahasamund	Mahasamund district	M Corp.	54,413	27,093	27,320	6,621	83.67%

== Nagar panchayats ==
The list of nagar panchayats and their population (as of 2011) is shown below:

Nagar palika	District	Population 2011
Adbhar	Sakti	10000
Ahiwara	Durg	18719
Akaltara	Janjgir–Champa	20367
Ambagarh Chowki	Rajnandgaon	8513
Arang	Raipur	16629
Bade Bacheli	Dantewada	20411
Bijapur	Bijapur	16129
Kirandul	Dantewada	18887
Baghbahara	Mahasamund	16747
Baikunthpur	Koriya	10077
Balod	Balod	21165
Baloda	Janjgir–Champa	11331
Baloda bazar	Balodabazar Bhatapara	22853
Bemetra	Bemetra	23315
Bhatgaon	Raipur	8228
Bhatapara	Baloda Bazar	57537
Bilha	Bilaspur	8988
Bishrampur	Surajpur district	11,367
Bodri	Bilaspur	13403
Chandkhuri	Raipur	3341
Chandrapur	Janjgir–Champa	7688
Chhuikhadan	Rajnandgaon	7093
Dabhra	Janjgir–Champa	7854
Dalli Rajhara	Balod	44363
Dantewada	Dantewada	6641
Dhamdha	Durg	8577
Dharamjaigarh	Raigarh	13598
Dongergaon	Rajnandgaon	11517
Gandai	Rajnandgaon	11831
Gaurella	Gaurella-Pendra-Marwahi	15189
Gharghoda	Raigarh	8103
Jashpur Nagar	Jashpur	20239
Kanker	Kanker	37442
Katghora	Korba	18523
Khairagarh	Rajnandgaon	15157
Khamharia	Durg	6799
Kharod	Janjgir–Champa	8606
Kharsia	Raigarh	17388
Kirandul	Dantewada	18887
Kondagaon	Kondagaon	40921
Kota	Raipur	15031
Kurud	Dhamtari	11473
Lormi	Mungeli	12156
Manendragarh	Manendragarh-Chirmiri-Bharatpur	30748
Narayanpur	Narayanpur	22106
Naya Baradwar	Janjgir–Champa	6231
Pratappur	Surajpur	10783
Pandariya	Kabirdham	12477
Patan	Durg	8812
Pathalgaon	Jashpur	13956
Pendra	Gaurella-Pendra-Marwahi	12397
Pithora	Mahasamund	7934
Odagi	Surajpur district	8603
Ramanujganj	Balrampur	9855
Ratanpur	Bilaspur	19839
Sakti	Janjgir–Champa	20213
Saraipali	Mahasamund	17081
Sarangarh	Raigarh	14459
Shivrinarayan	Janjgir–Champa	8107
Simga	Balodabazar Bhatapara	13143
Sukma	Sukma	13926
Surajpur	Surajpur	16834
Takhatpur	Bilaspur	17005
Telgaon	Surajpur district	11204
Sargaon	Mungeli District	7,484
Pathariya	Mungeli District	6,349
