= List of districts of Chhattisgarh =

Districts of Chhattisgarh coloured by division: Surguja division Bilaspur division Durg division Raipur division Bastar division

Chhattisgarh, a state of India, has 33 administrative districts, up from 16 districts it had in 2000 when it was formed as a new state.

== Background ==
A district of an Indian state is an administrative geographical unit, headed by a district magistrate or a deputy commissioner, an officer belonging to the Indian Administrative Service. The district magistrate or the deputy commissioner is assisted by a number of officials belonging to different wings of the administrative services of the state.

A superintendent of police, an officer belonging to Indian Police Service, is entrusted with the responsibility of maintaining law and order and related issues.

== History ==
=== British Raj ===
Before Indian independence, present-day Chhattisgarh state was divided between the Central Provinces and Berar, a province of British India, and a number of princely states in the north, south, and east, which were part of the Eastern States Agency.

The British province encompassed the central portion of the state, and was made up of three districts, Raipur, Bilaspur, and Durg, which made up the Chhattisgarh Division of the Central Provinces. In 1906, Durg District was created out of the western portion of Raipur District.

The northern portion of the state, comprising present-day Koriya, Surajpur, Surguja, Jashpur, and Raigarh districts, was divided among the six princely states of Chang Bhakar, Jashpur, Koriya, Surajpur, Raigarh, Surguja, and Udaipur. To the west, the states of Nandgaon, Khairagarh, Chhuikhadan and Kawardha comprised parts of present-day Rajnandgaon and Kawardha districts. In the south, the state of Kanker comprised the northern portion of present-day Kanker District, and the state of Bastar included present-day Bastar and Dantewada districts and the southern part of Kanker District.

=== 1947-1999: Post-independence of India ===
After Indian Independence, the princely states were merged with the Central Provinces and Berar to form the new state of Madhya Pradesh. Present-day Chhattisgarh comprised seven districts of Madhya Pradesh. The former states of Kanker and Bastar formed the new Bastar District, the parts of Surguja, Korea, and Chang Bhakar formed the new Surguja District, and the states of Nandgaon, Khairagarh, Chhuikhadan and Kawardha formed the new Rajnandgaon District.

In 1998, the seven districts that make up present-day Chhattisgarh were reorganized to form 16 districts. Dantewada and Kanker districts were split from Bastar; Dhamtari District was split from Raipur; Janjgir-Champa and Korba districts were split from Bilaspur; Jashpur District was split from Raigarh; Kawardha District was formed from parts of Bilaspur and Rajnandgaon; Koriya and Surajpur District was split from Surguja; and Mahasamund District was split from Raipur.

=== 2000: Chhattisgarh as new state ===
On 1 November 2000, these 16 districts were split from Madhya Pradesh to form the new state of Chhattisgarh.

=== 2007 onwards: growth in number of districts ===
On 11 May 2007, two new districts, Bijapur and Narayanpur were carved out, taking the total number of districts to 18.

On 1 January 2012, the Chhattisgarh government announced 9 new districts, for a total of 27, including newly created Sukma, Kondagaon, Balod, Bemetara, Baloda Bazar, Gariaband, Mungeli, Surajpur and Balrampur districts.

On 15 August 2019, the Chhattisgarh chief minister announced the creation of Chhattisgarh's 28th district, Gaurela-Pendra-Marwahi, which was formally inaugurated on 10 February 2020 as the new district.

In September 2022, five new districts were inaugurated taking the total to 33 districts, including newly created Manpur-Mohla on 2 September, Sarangarh-Bilaigarh on 3 September, and Manendragarh and Sakti districts on 9 September, Khairagarh-Chhuikhadan-Gandai on 3 September 2022

== Regions and divisions ==
Chhattisgarh has 3 geographical regions:

- North - Northern Hills Region: covered by Surguja division (HQ at Ambikapur).
- Centre - Chhattisgarh Plains: covered by Durg, Raipur, Bilaspur divisions (each with eponymous HQ city).
- South - Bastar Plateau: covered by Bastar division (HQ at Jagdalpur).

== Existing districts of Chhattisgarh ==
=== Alphabetical list of districts ===
Chhattisgarh consists of 33 districts.

No.	Code	District	Headquarters	Population (2011)	Area (km^{2})	Density (/km^{2})	Official website	Map
1	BD	Balod	Balod	826,165	3,527.00	234	http://balod.gov.in/	
2	BB	Baloda Bazar-Bhatapara	Baloda Bazar	1,078,911	3,733.87	290	https://balodabazar.gov.in/	
3	BP	Balrampur	Balrampur	730,491	6,016.34	100	http://balrampur.gov.in/	
4	BA	Bastar	Jagdalpur	834,873	6,596.90	213	http://bastar.gov.in/	
5	BE	Bemetara	Bemetara	795,759	2,854.81	279	http://bemetara.gov.in/	
6	BJ	Bijapur	Bijapur	255,230	6,552.96	39	http://bijapur.gov.in/	
7	BI	Bilaspur	Bilaspur	1,625,502	3,511.10	463	http://bilaspur.gov.in/	
8	DW	Dantewada	Dantewada	283,479	3,410.50	83	http://dantewada.gov.in/	
9	DH	Dhamtari	Dhamtari	799,781	4,081.93	196	http://dhamtari.gov.in/	
10	DU	Durg	Durg	1,721,948	2,319.99	742	http://durg.gov.in/	
11	GB	Gariaband	Gariaband	597,653	5,854.94	103	http://gariaband.gov.in/	
12	GP	Gaurella-Pendra-Marwahi	Gaurella	336,420	2,307.39	166	https://gaurela-pendra-marwahi.cg.gov.in/	
13	JC	Janjgir-Champa	Janjgir	972,453	2375.59	360	http://janjgir-champa.gov.in/	
14	JA	Jashpur	Jashpur	851,669	6,457.41	132	https://jashpur.nic.in/en/	
15	KD	Kabirdham	Kawardha	822,526	4,447.05	185	http://kawardha.gov.in/	
16	KK	Kanker	Kanker	748,941	6,432.68	117	http://kanker.gov.in/	
17	KG	Kondagaon	Kondagaon	578,326	6,050.73	96	http://kondagaon.gov.in/	
18	KC	Khairagarh-Chhuikhadan-Gandai	Khairagarh	368,444	1553.84	237	https://s351ef186e18dc00c2d31982567235c559.s3waas.gov.in/	
19	KB	Korba	Korba	1,206,640	7,145.44	169	http://korba.gov.in/	
20	KO	Koriya	Baikunthpur	247,427	2001.779	37	http://korea.gov.in/	
21	MA	Mahasamund	Mahasamund	1,032,754	4,963.01	208	http://mahasamund.gov.in/	
22	MC	Manendragarh-Chirmiri-Bharatpur	Manendragarh	376,000	4226	89	https://manendragarh-chirmiri-bharatpur.cg.gov.in/en/	
23	MM	Mohla-Manpur- Ambagarh Chowki	Mohla	283,947	2145.29	132	https://mohla-manpur-ambagarhchowki.cg.gov.in/en/	
24	MG	Mungeli	Mungeli	701,707	2,750.36	255	http://mungeli.gov.in	
25	NP	Narayanpur	Narayanpur	139,820	6,922.68	20	http://narayanpur.gov.in/	
26	RG	Raigarh	Raigarh	1,112,982	6527.44	170	http://raigarh.gov.in/	
27	RP	Raipur	Raipur	2,160,876	2,914.37	742	http://raipur.gov.in/	
28	RN	Rajnandgaon	Rajnandgaon	884,742	8,070	110	http://rajnandgaon.gov.in/	
29	SB	Sarangarh-Bilaigarh	Sarangarh	607,434	1650.14	368	https://sarangarh-bilaigarh.cg.gov.in/	
30	SK	Sakti	Sakti	653,036	1600.88	408	https://sakti.cg.gov.in/	
31	SU	Sukma	Sukma	250,159	5,767.02	43	https://sukma.gov.in/	
32	SJ	Surajpur	Surajpur	789,043	4,998.26	158	http://surajpur.gov.in/	
33	SG	Surguja	Ambikapur	840,352	5,019.80	167	http://surguja.gov.in/	

=== List of districts by divisions ===
Divisions listed north to south and east to west, and within divisions the districts have been listed clockwise starting from northwest.

- North Chhattisgarh:
  - Surguja division (HQ: Amikapur)
    - Balrampur-Ramanujganj
    - Jashpur
    - Koriya
    - Manendragarh
    - Surajpur
    - Surguja
- Central Chhattisgarh:
  - North-Central Chhattisgarh: Bilaspur division (HQ: Bilaspur)
    - Bilaspur
    - Gaurella-Pendra-Marwahi
    - Janjgir-Champa
    - Korba
    - Mungeli
    - Raigarh
    - Sakti
    - Sarangarh-Bilaigarh
  - East-Central Raipur division (HQ: Raipur, also the state capital)
    - Baloda Bazar-Bhatapara
    - Dhamtari
    - Gariaband
    - Mahasamund
    - Raipur
  - West-Central Chhattisgarh: Durg division (HQ: Durg)
    - Balod
    - Bemetara
    - Durg
    - Kabirdham (Kawardha)
    - Khairagarh-Chhuikhadan-Gandai
    - Mohla-Manpur-Ambagarh Chowki
    - Rajnandgaon
- South Chhattisgarh
  - Bastar division (HQ: Jagdalpur)
    - Bastar
    - Bijapur
    - Dantewada (Dakshin Bastar)
    - Kanker (Uttar Bastar)
    - Kondagaon
    - Narayanpur
    - Sukma

=== List of districts with their major cities ===
No.	District	Headquarter	Largest city	Other cities or towns
1	Raipur	Raipur	Raipur	Naya Raipur, Sarona, Tatibandh, Nardaha, Ama Seoni, Kendri, Mana, Mana Camp, Sejbahar, Saddu, Daldal Seoni, Mowa, Kharora, Arang, Dharsiwa, Siltara, Birgaon, Tilda
2	Bilaspur	Bilaspur	Bilaspur	Kota (Kargi Road), Ratanpur, Takhatpur, Masturi, Bilha, Beltara
3	Durg	Durg	Bhilai	Charoda, Kumhari, Utai, Anda, Dhamdha, Patan, Risali, Ahiwara, Supela, Jamul, Rasmara, Baghera
4	Korba	Korba	Korba	Katghora, Pali, Dipka
5	Raigarh	Raigarh	Raigarh	Kharsia, Gharghora, Dharamjaigarh
6	Rajnandgaon	Rajnandgaon	Rajnandgaon	Dongargarh, Dongargaon, Chhuriya
7	Koriya	Baikunthpur	Baikunthpur	Sonhat, Patna, Churcha
8	Surguja	Ambikapur	Ambikapur	Sitapur
9	Balrampur	Balrampur	Ramanujganj	
10	Jashpur	Jashpur-Nagar	Jashpur-Nagar	Kunkuri, Patthalgaon
11	Surajpur	Surajpur	Surajpur	Bishrampur, Bhatgaon, Pratappur, Prem Nagar, Ramanuj Nagar, Bhaiyathan, Odagi
12	Janjgir–Champa	Janjgir	Champa	Janjgir, Akaltara
13	Mungeli	Mungeli	Mungeli	Lormi, Sargaon, Pathariya
14	Kabirdham	Kawardha	Kawardha	Pandariya, Pandatarai
15	Bemetara	Bemetara	Bemetara	Saja, Berla, Navagarh, Deokar
16	Balod	Balod	Balod	Dalli-Rajhara, Dondi Lohara, Dondi
17	Baloda Bazar-Bhatapara	Baloda Bazar	Bhatapara	Balodabazar, Bhatapara, Kasdol, Simga, Palari, Bilaigarh
18	Gariaband	Gariaband	Gariaband	Fingeshwar, Chhura, Gariaband, Deobhog, Mainpur
19	Mahasamund district	Mahasamund	Mahasamund	Saraipali, Basna, Pithoura, Mahasamund, Bagbahra
20	Dhamtari	Dhamtari	Dhamtari	Kurud, Nagri
21	Bijapur	Bijapur	Bijapur	
22	Narayanpur	Narayanpur	Narayanpur	
23	North Bastar	Kanker	Kanker	Bhanupratapur
24	Bastar	Jagdalpur	Jagdalpur	Bastar
25	South Bastar	Dantewada	Dantewada	
26	Kondagaon	Kondagaon	Kondagaon	
27	Sukma	Sukma	Sukma	Konta
28	Gaurella-Pendra-Marwahi	Gaurella	Gaurella, Pendra, Marwahi	Pendra, Pendraroad
29	Manendragarh-Chirmiri-Bharatpur	Manendragarh	Chirmiri	Manendragarh, Khongapani
30	Khairagarh-Chhuikhadan-Gandai	Khairagarh	Khairagarh	Chhuikhadan
31	Sakti	Sakti	Sakti	Baradwar, Malkharoda, Jaijaipur, Dabhra, Chandrapur, Hasaud, Adbhar, Bhothiya
32	Mohla-Manpur-Ambagarh Chowki	Mohla	Ambagarh Chowki	Manpur, Mohla, Ambagarh Chowki, Aundhi
33	Sarangarh-Bilaigarh	Sarangarh	Sarangarh	Bilaigarh

== Proposals for administrative reorganization ==
Proposals for administrative restructuring and boundary reorganization in Chhattisgarh are primarily driven by objectives related to decentralizing governance, accelerating economic development in remote regions, and improving public service delivery in areas historically affected by Left-Wing Extremism (LWE). Proponents argue that smaller administrative units and localized headquarters enhance state presence and improve access to health, education, and infrastructure frameworks.

=== State Capital Region ===
There are ongoing proposals to officially establish a unified Raipur State Capital Region (SCR). This planned metropolitan region would encompass the urban areas of Raipur, Nava Raipur, Bhilai, and Durg under a single regional development authority to facilitate integrated infrastructure planning and investment coordination.

=== Proposed regional capitals ===
To promote balanced regional growth and decentralize administrative functions, several centrally located urban hubs have been proposed as regional capitals or primary divisional headquarters:

- Ambikapur: Proposed as the primary urban and administrative anchor for northern Chhattisgarh (Surguja region).
- Bilaspur: Proposed to serve as the administrative focus for the north-central region.
- Benoor: Proposed as a central administrative capital for the upper-south (Bastar) region to bring governance offices closer to interior areas.
- Puwarti: Proposed as a lower-south regional capital, located within interior LWE-affected zones, to anchor development-led civic initiatives.

=== Proposed administrative divisions ===
List of Proposed Administrative Divisions
Proposed Division	Expected Headquarters / Location	Rationale for Creation
Rajnandgaon Division	Rajnandgaon	Proposed by relocating administrative functions from Bhilai to Rajnandgaon, an aspirational district hub, to improve administrative proximity and service efficiency across the western blocks.
Bijapur Division	Bijapur or Puwarti	Proposed to be carved out from the large Bastar division to establish closer administrative oversight in the southwestern interior districts.
Benoor Division	Benoor, Kondagaon, or Narayanpur	Proposed by relocating the current Bastar division headquarters from Jagdalpur to a more central location to bridge distances for interior forest-dwelling populations.

=== Proposed districts ===
List of Proposed Districts Grouped by Region and Parent District
Proposed District	Current Parent District(s)	Description and Rationale
Northern Region (Surguja Division)
Bharatpur	Manendragarh-Chirmiri-Bharatpur	Comprising the existing Bharatpur subdivision located along State Highway 8 near the remote Madhya Pradesh border.
Sanawal	Balrampur-Ramanujganj	Located approximately 75 km away from the current district headquarters along the remote Renukoot–Bagharu–Sanawal–Ramanujganj road.
Kusmi	Balrampur-Ramanujganj	Proposed to address the geographic isolation of the remote hilly tracts situated between Balrampur and Jashpur Nagar.
North-Central Region (Bilaspur Division)
Dharamjaigarh	Raigarh	Currently an administrative block located 90–100 km from surrounding district centers; proposed to address tribal rights administration and local mining logistics.
Pamsala	Raigarh, Jashpur, and Surguja	Proposed as a composite border district situated 90–100 km away from existing peripheral district headquarters.
Chotiya-Parla	Korba / Janjgir-Champa	Proposed to serve as a centrally located administrative unit for the interior blocks of the central mining belt.
East-Central Region (Raipur / Bilaspur Margins)
Saraipalli	Mahasamund	Currently a major tehsil located 90–100 km away from regional administrative anchors like Raigarh and Champa.
Pithora	Mahasamund	Proposed to be carved out to create a separate administrative unit approximately 60 km from Saraipalli, fulfilling long-standing local administrative representations.
West-Central Region (Durg / Raipur Divisions)
Kothitola	Rajnandgaon	Proposed to facilitate localized socio-economic infrastructure delivery and accelerate the construction of the Pendrideed–Kothitola–Sakhritola highway link.
Badna-Kukdur	Kabirdham	Demanded to strengthen public utility delivery and develop transport infrastructure along the Kukdur–Badna–Motinala highway corridor.
Gudru-Semara	Baloda Bazar-Bhatapara	Proposed to create a comprehensive administrative district with Gudru as the district headquarters and Bhatapara as a major sub-divisional hub to balance holistic regional development.
Southern Region (Bastar Division)
Kakreli	Bijapur / Narayanpur	Proposed to improve governance accessibility across the remote borders of Bijapur and Narayanpur; incorporates demands for the Amdikanda area.
Pakhanjur	Kanker	Centered around a major town and nagar panchayat in the northern Bastar frontier to bring sub-divisional operations closer to local communities.
Bhanupartappur	Kanker	Located on State Highway 6; currently an established administrative block and legislative assembly constituency requiring elevated administrative status.
Bhopalpatnam	Bijapur	Located at a strategic tri-state border junction. The proposal envisions a collaborative regional infrastructure framework with Bhadrakali (Chhattisgarh), Somnoor Navin (Maharashtra), and Palmala (Telangana).
Puwarti	Bijapur / Sukma	Positioned in an interior forest tract straddling two heavily LWE-affected districts to prioritize proactive development and basic service delivery.
Konta	Sukma	A major border tehsil in the southernmost section of the state requiring localized administrative infrastructure.

== See also ==
- List of districts in India
- Administrative divisions of India
