= Surguja division =

Administrative division of Chhattisgarh, India

Surguja division सरगुजा संभाग
- Division of Chhattisgarh
- Location within Chhattisgarh Location within India
- Coordinates (Ambikapur): 23.12°N 83.18°E
- Country: India
- State: Chhattisgarh
- Headquarters: Ambikapur
- Districts: 6 (Balrampur-Ramanujganj, Jashpur, Koriya, Manendragarh-Chirmiri-Bharatpur, Surajpur and Surguja)
- Time zone: UTC+05:30 (IST)
- Website: surguja.gov.in

Surguja division is an administrative unit of the Indian state of Chhattisgarh. Headquartered in Ambikapur, it encompasses the northern part of the state, known for its dense forests, hilly terrain, and significant tribal population.

== History ==
The division was officially created by the Government of Chhattisgarh in 2008 to improve administrative efficiency in the northern tribal belt. Historically, the area comprised several princely states, including Surguja State, Jashpur State, and Korea State. After India's independence, these were merged into the Madhya Pradesh state before becoming part of Chhattisgarh in 2000.

== Administration ==
The division is headed by a Divisional Commissioner. As of 2026, it comprises six districts:

District	Headquarters	Area (km²)	Established
Surguja	Ambikapur	5,732	1948
Jashpur	Jashpur Nagar	6,457	1998
Koriya	Baikunthpur	5,978	1998
Surajpur	Surajpur	2,787	2012
Balrampur-Ramanujganj	Balrampur	3,806	2012
Manendragarh-Chirmiri-Bharatpur	Manendragarh	4,226	2022

== Economy ==
The economy of the Surguja division is primarily driven by agriculture and mining:

- Coal Mining: The division contains significant coal reserves, with major mines operated by South Eastern Coalfields (SECL) in the Hasdeo-Arand and Chirimiri regions.
- Agriculture: It is known for the production of aromatic rice varieties and forest produce like Mahua and Tendu leaves.

== Geography ==
The region is part of the Chota Nagpur Plateau and features the Mainpat plateau, often referred to as the "Shimla of Chhattisgarh" due to its cool climate and Tibetan settlement.
