= Maa Mahamaya Airport =

Domestic airport in Ambikapur, Chhattisgarh, India

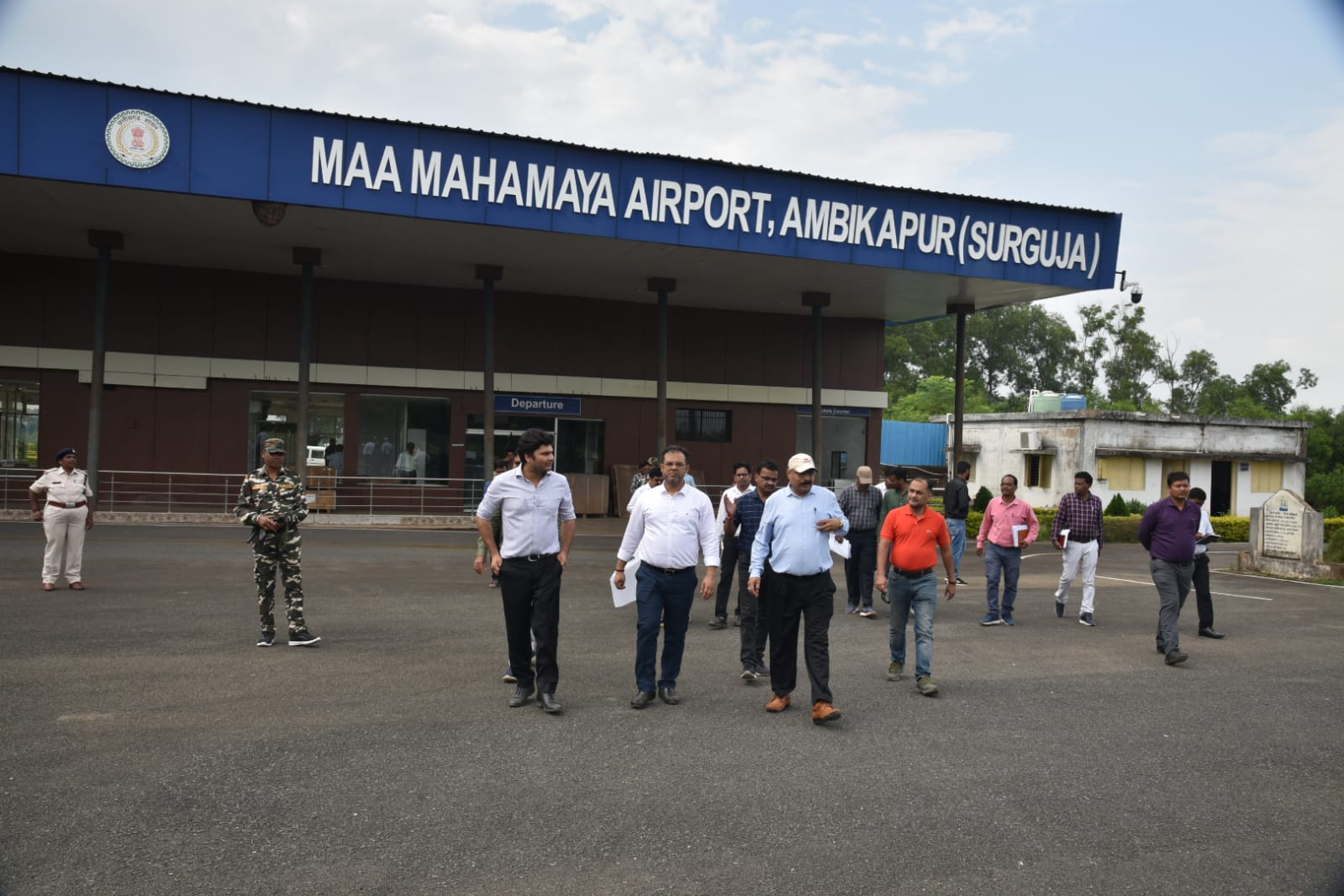
- IATA: AHA; ICAO: VEAP

Summary
- Airport type: Public
- Owner: Government of Chhattisgarh
- Operator: Airports Authority of India
- Serves: Ambikapur
- Location: Darima, Ambikapur, Chhattisgarh, India
- Elevation AMSL: 1,930 ft (590 m)
- Coordinates: 22°59′14.1″N 83°11′46.1″E
- Website: Ambikapur Airport

Map
- Location of the airport in Chhattisgarh AHA (India)

Runways
Direction	Length		Surface
Direction	ft	m	Surface
16/34	6,299	1,920	Asphalt

Statistics (April 2025 – March 2026)
- Passengers: 1,086 (▲17.8%)
- Aircraft movements: 231 (▲43.5%)
- Cargo tonnage: —
- Source: AAI

Maa Mahamaya Airport (IATA: AHA, ICAO: VEAP), also known as Ambikapur Airport and Darima Airport, is a domestic airport serving the city of Ambikapur in Chhattisgarh, India. It is located at Darima, 12 km (7.5 mi) south of the city centre. It also serves the surrounding northern part of the state consisting of nearby towns like Surajpur, Baikunthpur, Bhatgaon, Mainpat, Sitapur, Bishrampur, Balrampur and Ramanujganj. In the coming years, as the airport will develop, it will connect major cities like Jabalpur, New Delhi, Kolkata and Prayagraj with more airlines and bigger aircraft, resulting in enhanced development and employment opportunities to locals and the overall state. Presently there are no operational flights from Ambikapur Airport

== History ==
The airstrip in Darima area near Ambikapur was constructed in 1950. Then Prime Minister Smt. Indira Gandhi visited the airstrip in 1974. The airstrip was used for small aircraft and helicopters primarily for VIP visits.

The name of airport was changed from Darima Airport to "Maa Mahamaya Airport, Ambikapur" on 30 March 2021, In the name of Maa Mahamaya (Ambika Devi), the goddess of Ambikapur city.

== Upgrade ==
The airstrip upgrade work was finished in May 2023 at a cost of Rs. 48 crore from category 2C to 3C, to enable operations of 70-72 seater aircraft under UDAN Scheme. Making this the Fourth Public Serving Airport in Chhattisgarh after Raipur, Jagdalpur and Bilaspur.

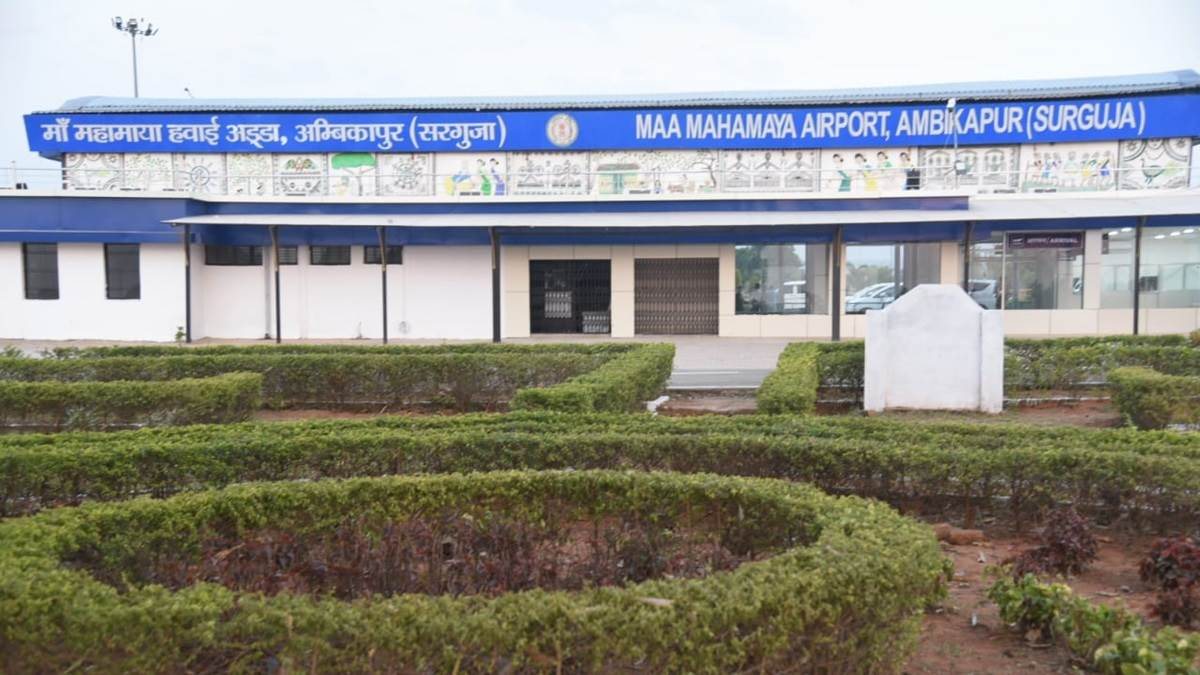
Ambikapur Airport

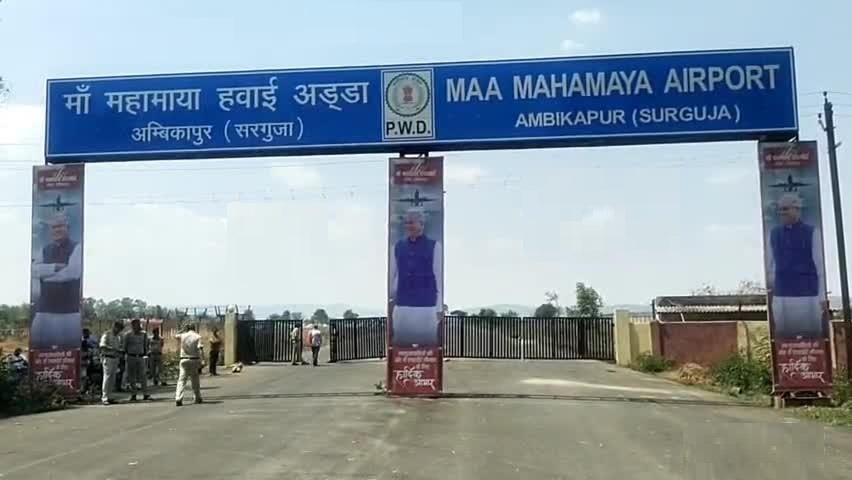
Airport entry

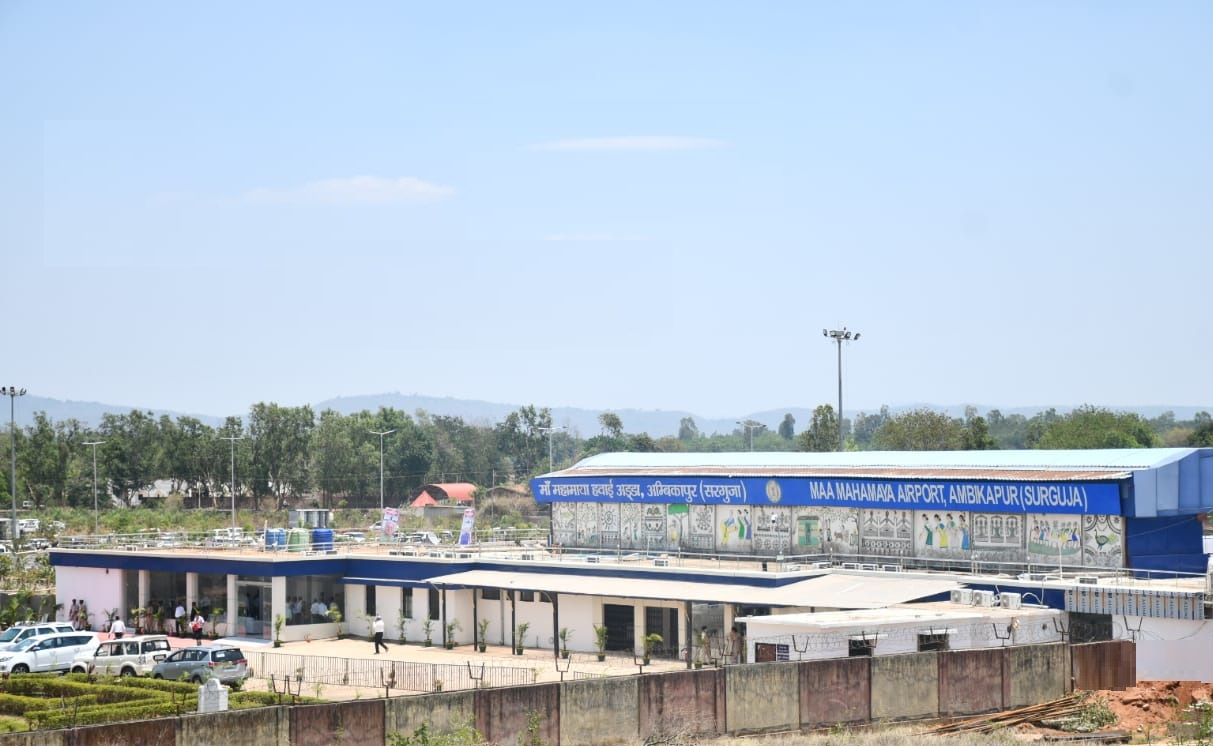
Rear view

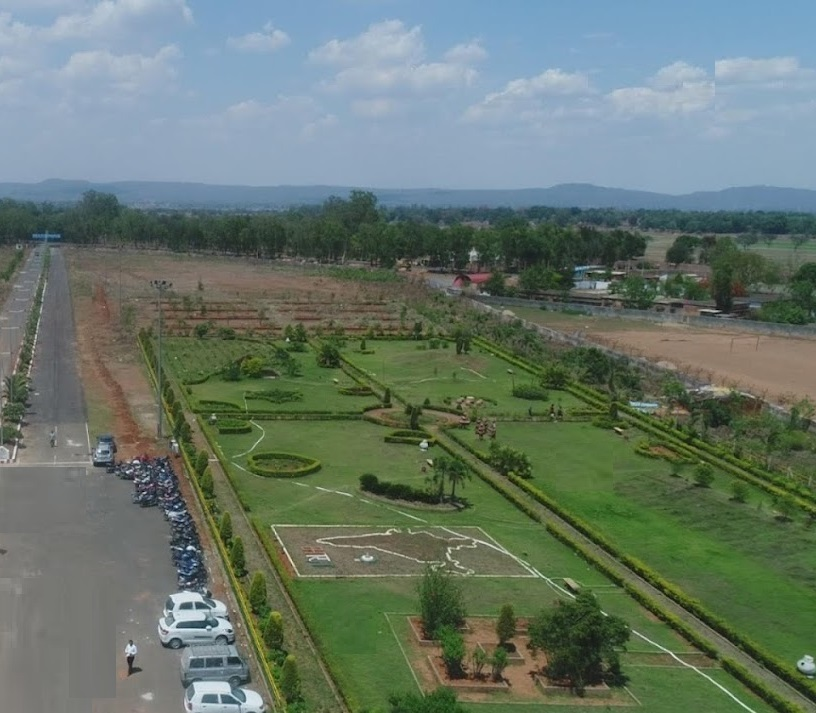
Parking and landscaping

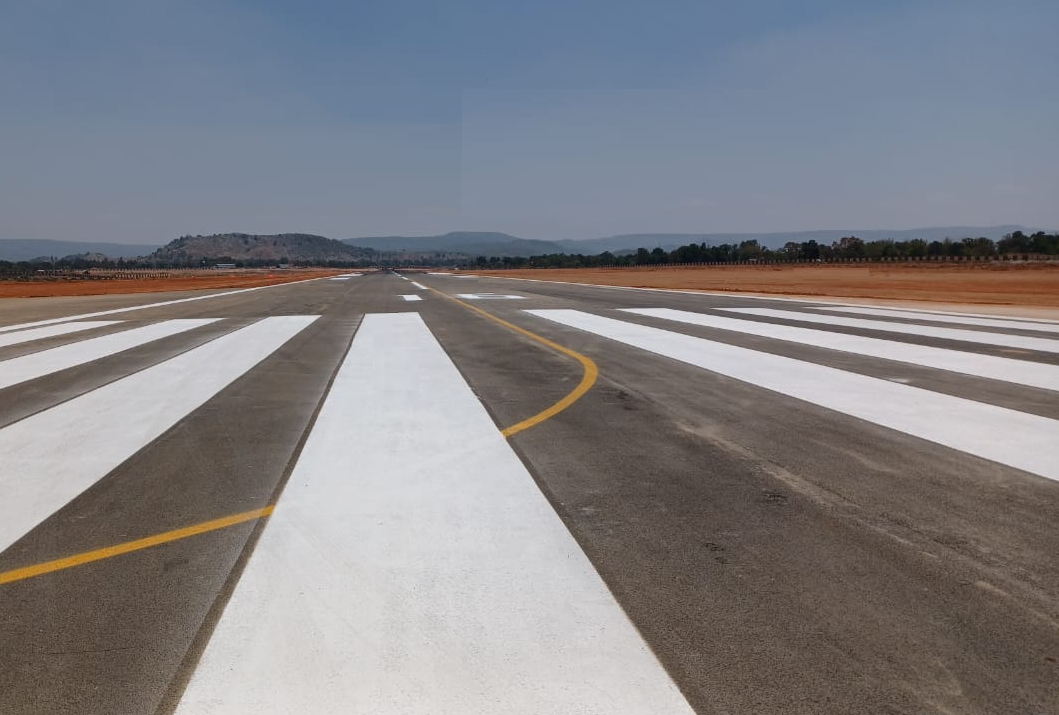
Runway view

== Airlines and destinations ==
Airlines	Destinations
Alliance Air	Delhi, Kolkata , Raipur
FlyBig	Raipur, Bilaspur

== Operational status ==
Upgrades of the airport were completed in May 2023. The first test flight landed on 4 May 2023 by the Aviation authority. After approval of DGCA (Directorate General of Civil Aviation), flights to Delhi, Varanasi, and Raipur are proposed.

DGCA team inspected Ambikapur Airport on 15/05/2023. The Directorate General of Civil Aviation (DGCA) has issued the aerodrome license for Ambikapur airport in Chhattisgarh's Surguja district on 15/03/2024 to start flight operations

Prime Minister Narendra Modi virtually inaugurated the airport on October 20, 2024.
