= Bhaiyathan =

Bhaiyathan is a panchayat village in Surajpur District in the Indian state of Chhattisgarh. Bhaiyathan is part of a community development block under the jurisdiction of Surajpur district and is 23 km away from Surajpur. It is situated on the bank of the Rihand River. Tamor Pingla Wildlife Sanctuary is a major attraction nearby. A famous Devi temple on a hill, Kudargarh, is just 23 km from Bhaiyathan.

A 2x600 MW thermal power project has been proposed by the Union Power Ministry in Bhaiyathan. It will be installed by Chhattisgarh State Electricity Board (CSEB). CSEB will be the first electricity board in the country to install 600 MW super critical units, which only National Thermal Power Corporation (NTPC) has adopted so far.

== History ==
In the early 17th century, two cousins of the Agnikul Chauhan Raja of Mainpuri, Dalthamban Sahi and Dharamel Sahi, were returning from a pilgrimage to Jagannath Puri. They had a small force with them. On their return journey, they halted at the Capital of Surguja State, Ambikapur. They camped near the Joda talab (Bhaiya Bada) which still exists to this day. The Maharaja of Surguja was away from the Capital and some rebel sardars of the State surrounded the palace. The Rani came to know that the Chauhan brothers were camping near the Joda Talab. She sent the traditional Rakhi. Dalthamban Sahi and Dharamel Sahi came to her rescue and drove away the bagi sardars. A major part of their force was killed in the encounter. After some time the Maharaja returned. He thanked the Chauhan brothers for rescuing the Rani and offered them the Jagirdari of the area on the northern part of the state known as Jhilmili Estate. This was accepted by the older brother Dalthamban Sahi. A part of Jhilmili Area was under control of Baland Rajas.

The Chauhan brothers settled at Kaskela village on the banks of the Rihand River. They drove away the forces of Baland from the area and overpowered the Pakharias who were perpetually rebelling against the Surguja State. They paid an Annual Tribute to the Surguja State. The title of Bhaiya was conferred on the family by Maharajah Amar Singh Deo Bahadoor "Surguja State". Since after the tying of the Rakhi, the brothers had become bhaiyas of Rani, the ilaka (area) was known as Bhaiyasthan. This was later known as Bhaiyathan.

On 10 February 1872, A Khilat was granted by the court of commissioner esq. the title of Bhaiya Bahadur was also granted to shri Fateh Narayan Singh illakedar of Jhilimi Surguja for meritorious services to the government. The Title of Bhaiya Bahadur was Granted by Raja Bahadur Bindeshwari Prasad Singh Deo C.S.I of Udaipur State" Manager Court of Ward "Surguja State". Younger Son of Maharajah Amar Singh Deo Bahadoor "Surguja State".

== Places to See ==
Telgaon

== Localities ==
- Bhaiyathan Purani Basti
- Harrapara
- Darripara
- Samouli
- Hospital Colony ( New Market )
- Paasal

Landmarks in the area include the (Lal Vindeshwari Pratap Singh Deo Indraprastha Bhaiya Garhi Jhilmili Bhaiyathan), Palata Bhairav mandir (temple).

1.Bhaiya Bahadur Lal Mahamaya Pratap Singhdeo of Bade Gadhi.

2.Lal Samar Bahadur Singh dev and Lal Kaushal Pratap Singh dev of chota gadhi.

== See also ==
- Surajpur District
