= Guru Ghasidas - Tamor Pingla Tiger Reserve =

Tiger reserve in India

- IUCN category II (national park)
- Location within Chhattisgarh Location within India
- Interactive map of Guru Ghasidas - Tamor Pingla Tiger Reserve
- Location: Manendragarh-Chirmiri-Bharatpur (MCB), Korea, Surajpur and Balrampur, Chhattisgarh
- Nearest city: Baikunthpur
- Coordinates: 23°36′7″N 82°28′19″E
- Area: 2,829.387 km^{2} (1,092.432 sq mi)
- Established: 2024
- Governing body: Ministry of Environment, Forest and Climate Change, Chhattisgarh Forest Department

Guru Ghasidas-Tamor Pingla Tiger Reserve is a tiger reserve in Chhattisgarh, situated across the districts of Manendragarh-Chirmiri-Bharatpur (MCB), Korea, Surajpur, and Balrampur districts. This tiger reserve covers a total area of 2,829.38 square kilometres (1,092.43 sq mi), including a core or critical tiger habitat of 2,049.2 square kilometres (791.2 sq mi), which consists of the Guru Ghasidas National Park and the Tamor Pingla Wildlife Sanctuary, along with a buffer zone of 780.15 square kilometres (301.22 sq mi). It is 56th Tiger Reserve of India announced in 2024.

The Guru Ghasidas-Tamor Pingla Tiger Reserve received final approval for its notification from the National Tiger Conservation Authority in October 2021. This designation positions it as the third largest tiger reserve in the nation, following the Nagarjunsagar-Srisailam Tiger Reserve in Andhra Pradesh and the Manas Tiger Reserve in Assam.

== Biodiversity ==
The Guru Ghasidas-Tamor Pingla forest consist of sal, saja, dhavda, kusum tree. The Zoological Survey of India has recorded a total of 753 species within the Guru Ghasidas-Tamor Pingla Tiger Reserve, comprising 365 invertebrates and 388 vertebrates. The invertebrate population is predominantly made up of insects, while the vertebrate population features 230 bird species and 55 mammal species, including several that are classified as threatened.

The reserve is home to wide variety of wildlife species including chital, elephant, nilgai, chinkara, Indian bison, leopard, tiger, sloth bear, wolf, otter, jackal, hyena, langur, vulture and peacock. As of 2024, there were five to six tigers in the reserve.

== Geography ==
Location of Guru Ghasidas-Tamor Pingla Tiger Reserve in Chhattisgarh
M: municipality, NP: National Park, WLS: Wildlife Sanctuary

The core area of the tiger reserve is 2,049.23 km^{2} (791.21 sq mi), including 1,440.70 km^{2} (556.26 sq mi) of Guru Ghasidas National Park and 608.52 km^{2} (234.95 sq mi) of Tamor Pingla Wildlife Sanctuary. The buffer area is 780.15 km^{2} (301.22 sq mi). The total area of the reserve is 2,829.38 km^{2} (1,092.43 sq mi). In accordance with the landscape approach to conservation proposed in India's National Wildlife Plan, this tiger reserve is adjacent to the Sanjay-Dubri Tiger Reserve in Madhya Pradesh, forming a landscape complex that covers nearly 4,500 square kilometres (1,700 sq mi). Furthermore, this tiger reserve is connected to the Bandhavgarh Tiger Reserve to the west and the Palamau Tiger Reserve to the east in Jharkhand.

Situated in the Chhota Nagpur Plateau and extending into the Baghelkhand plateau, the tiger reserve is characterized by its varied landscapes, dense woodlands, and numerous streams and rivers, which create an environment conducive to a rich diversity of fauna and serve as vital habitats for the tiger.
