= Sarguja University =

University in Chhattisgarh

Coordinates: 23.1122°N 83.1928°E

- Former name: Sarguja University
- Type: State University
- Established: 2008
- Affiliations: UGC
- Chancellor: Governor of Chhattisgarh
- Vice-Chancellor: Prof. Rajendra Lakpale
- Location: Ambikapur, Chhattisgarh, India
- Website: http://www.sggcg.in/

Sant Gahira Guru Vishwavidyalaya formerly Sarguja University is a state university located in Ambikapur, Chhattisgarh, India. It is a teaching-cum-affiliating university which affiliates 75 college and has 7 departments and 1 constituent college. It was established and incorporated by Chhattisgarh Vishwavidyalaya Adhiniyam No. 18 of 2008 on September 2, 2008. The university was established to serve the society through dissemination of knowledge in all the disciplines.

== Academics ==
Arts, Humanities, and Social Sciences

Commerce

Computer Applications and IT

Education

Law

Management and Business Administration

Pharmacy

Sciences

Sarguja University offers various programs through its University Teaching Departments (U.T.D.)

- Master of Science (Environmental Science)
- Master of Arts (Functional Hindi)
- Master of Science (Farm-Forestry)
- Master of Science (Biotechnology)
- LL.M. (Human Rights)
- Diploma in Pharmacy

=== Departments ===
- Department of Environmental Science
- Department of Pharmacy
- Department of Legal Studies
- Department of Computer Science
- Department of Farm-Forestry
- Department of Functional Hindi
- Department of Biotechnology
- Department of Zoology
- Department of Chemistry
- Department of Botany
- Department of Economics
- Department of Microbiology
- Department of Anthropology

== Affiliated colleges ==
The territorial jurisdiction of the university extends to the entire Sarguja division comprising 6 revenue districts: Balrampur, Jashpur, Koriya, Manendragarh-Chirmiri-Bharatpur district, Surajpur and Surguja .

== Vishwavidyalaya Engineering College, Ambikapur ==
Vishwavidyalaya Engineering College (VEC), Ambikapur (A State Govt. Owned Organization) is a constituent college of CSVTU Bhilai. It was established in 2010 and has 5 departments (CSE, Civil, Electrical, Mechanical & Mining) that offer Bachelor of Technology and Master of Technology courses.
