= Bhatgaon =

Bhatgaon may refer to:

- Bhatgaon, Nepal, a town about 8 km from Kathmandu
- Bhatgaon, Raipur, a town in Chhattisgarh, India
- Bhatgaon, Surajpur, a town in Chhattisgarh, India
- Bhatgaon, Lucknow, a village in Uttar Pradesh, India
