= Tamor Pingla Wildlife Sanctuary =

Wildlife sanctuary in Chhattisgarh, India

- IUCN category IV (habitat/species management area)
- Location within Chhattisgarh Location within India
- Interactive map of Tamor Pingla Wildlife Sanctuary
- Location: Surajpur District, Chhattisgarh, India
- Nearest city: Surajpur
- Coordinates: 23.65°N 82.90°E
- Area: 608.51 km^{2} (234.95 sq mi)
- Elevation: 617 m (2,024 ft)
- Established: 1978 (as wildlife sanctuary); 2021 (as Tiger Reserve)

Tamor Pingla Wildlife Sanctuary is located in Surajpur District, Chhattisgarh, in central India. It was declared a wildlife sanctuary in 1978. In 2021, the National Tiger Conservation Authority approved the Chhattisgarh government's proposal to combine the areas of Guru Ghasidas National Park and Tamor Pingla Wildlife Sanctuary as a Guru Ghasidas - Tamor Pingla Tiger Reserve.

== Geography ==
The northern boundary is the Moran river, the eastern boundary is Bonga Nalla, and the western boundary is Rihand River. This area was notified as Wildlife Sanctuary in 1978. It is named after the Tamor Hill and Pingla Nalla, the old and prominent features of the area. In 2011, the Chhattisgarh's Government notified it as part of Surguja Jashpur Elephant Reserve. It is spread over 608.55 square kilometres (234.96 sq mi).

== Flora ==
The area is consist of mixed deciduous forests of Sal and bamboo tree.

== Fauna ==
The sanctuary supports Asian elephant, Bengal tiger, Indian leopard, bears, sambar, nilgai, chital, bison, chousingha, chinkara, muntjac, boar, dhole, wolf, jackal, hyena, hare, cobras, pythons, red jungle fowl, gray jungle fowl and green pigeon.

== Access ==
The sanctuary is about 35 km (22 mi) north of Surajpur.

== See also ==
- Sanjay-Dubri Tiger Reserve
- Surguja State
