= Basadre =

Basadre may refer to:

- Estadio Jorge Basadre, multi-purpose stadium in Tacna, Peru
- Genebert Basadre (1984–2021), amateur boxer from the Philippines
- Jorge Basadre (1903–1980), Peruvian historian and writer
- Jorge Basadre Grohmann National University, public university in Tacna, Peru
- Jorge Basadre Province, one of four provinces in the Tacna Region of Peru

== See also ==
- Basdei
- Basscadet
