= Ambikapur railway station =

Railway station in Chhattisgarh

Ambikapur अम्बिकापुर

General information
- Location: Ambikapur, Surguja district, Chhattisgarh; India
- Coordinates: 23.1365°N 83.1436°E
- System: Express train and Passenger train station

Construction
- Parking: Available

Other information
- Status: Functional
- Station code: ABKP
- Zone(s): South East Central Railway zone
- Division(s): Bilaspur
Location

Ambikapur, station code ABKP, is a railway station that connects the city of Ambikapur, Chhattisgarh to the Indian Railway network. It is the connecting point of Surguja district and Surajpur district and falls within the South East Central Railway zone of the Indian Railways.

== History ==
This is one of the Railway stations that connects North Chhatishgarh with Raipur. The Railway Ministry plans to build a new 178 km (111 mi) km line between Ambikapur (Chhattisgarh) and Barwadih (Jharkhand). The proposed line will reduce the distance between Mumbai and Howrah via Jabalpur by about 420.25 km (261 mi).

Britishers were the first to moot the proposal way back in 1925 to connect Ambikapur and Barwadih, both coal-rich areas, by rail. The plan was aimed to facilitate the transportation of minerals.

The new rail line will give connectivity from Howrah, Dhanbad & Ranchi to Mumbai via Lohardaga, Barkakana, Latehar, Barwadih, Ambikapur, Katni, Jabalpur & Itarsi. It would help reducing the rail distance between the two Metros. At present, both the Metros are connected by two different rail routes one via Nagpur & Bilaspur and another via Itarsi & Jabalpur.

The distance between Howrah and Mumbai via Jabalpur is 2,162.5 km (1,344 mi) km while the same via Nagpur comes to be around 1,970.5 km (1,224 mi). The railway runs maximum trains between both the Metros via Nagpur–Bilaspur section. Besides a daily Kolkata mail, a couple of weekly trains chug on Jabalpur–Itarsi section.

Also, New line from Ambikapur to Renukoot is being survey by the Indian Railways in 2023.

== Trains Operating ==
TRAINS STARTING FROM AMBIKAPUR

Ambikapur - Jabalpur Intercity Express # 11266

Ambikapur - Durg Express (Pt) # 18242

Ambikapur Shahdol Passenger # 58702

Ambikapur-Hazrat Nizamuddin superfast # 22407

Ambikapur - Shahdol Express # 18756

TRAINS TERMINATING AT AMBIKAPUR

Mml Ambikapur Express # 11265

Shahdol Ambikapur Passenger # 58701

Durg Ambikapur express # 18241

Hazrat Nizamuddin - Ambikapur Superfast # 22408

Shahdol Ambikapur Express # 18755

== Upgradation ==
Ambikapur railway station has been identified by Indian Railways under the Amrit Bharat Station Scheme for development. Amrit Bharat Scheme involves preparation of Master Plans and their implementation in phases to improve the amenities at the stations like improvement of station access, circulating areas, waiting halls, toilets, lift/escalators as necessary, cleanliness, free Wi-Fi, kiosks for local products through schemes like ‘One Station One Product’, better passenger information systems, executive lounges, nominated spaces for business meetings, landscaping etc. keeping in view the necessity at each station.

== See also ==
- Barwadih
- Latehar
- Palamu
