= Kudargarh =

Maa Bageshwari Devi
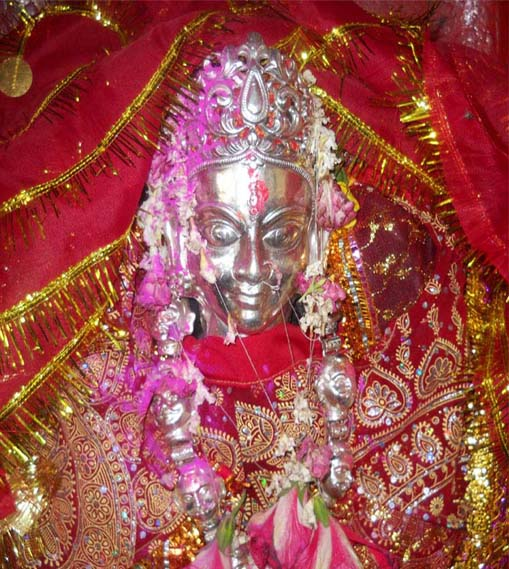

Religion
- Affiliation: Hinduism
- District: Surajpur

Location
- State: Chhattisgarh
- Country: India

Website
- www.maakudargarhi.in

Kudargarh is a Hindu pilgrim centre situated in Surajpur District of the state of Chhattisgarh in India. It is 44 km from the district headquarters of Surajpur.

The history of the temple is obscure. According to Dalton, the temple was built by Suryavanshi Khairwar Baland Rajput Kings. Balands were the original rulers of the Koriya district in the 17th century. There are total 893 steps from one side to climb to the temple located on the hilltop. This Trek has many resting places, water points, selfie points, etc for the pilgrims. If the KUDARGARHI DEVI fulfills one's wish he/she can sacrifice a goat there.
