= Mohla-Manpur-Ambagarh Chowki district =

- District of Chhattisgarh
- Location in Chhattisgarh
- Coordinates (Mohla): 20.59°N 80.75°E
- Country: India
- State: Chhattisgarh
- Division: Durg
- Headquarters: Mohla
- Tehsils: 3

Government
  - Vidhan Sabha constituencies: 1

Area
  - Total: 2,145.29 km^{2} (828.30 sq mi)

Population (2011)
  - Total: 283,947
  - Density: 132.3/km^{2} (343/sq mi)

Demographics
  - Literacy: 74.4%
  - Sex ratio: 1027
- Time zone: UTC+05:30 (IST)
- Major highways: 3

Mohla-Manpur-Ambagarh Chowki district, with district headquarter at Mohla, is one of the four new district in the state of Chhattisgarh, India announced by Bhupesh Baghel on 15 August 2021. It is carved out from existing Rajnandgaon district.

== Sub Division ==
District is sub divided into five tehsils:

1. Ambagarh Chowki
2. Manpur
3. Mohla
4. Aundhi
5. Khadgaon

== Demographics ==
Religions in Mohla-Manpur district (2011)
Religion	Percent
Hinduism	90.85%
Other (Tribal religions)	4.35%
Buddhism	3.07%
Islam	0.90%
Christianity	0.62%
Other or not stated	0.21%
Distribution of religions

At the time of the 2011 census, Mohla-Manpur district had a population of 283,947, of which 9,889 (3.49%) lived in urban areas. The district has a sex ratio of 1027 females to 1000 males. Scheduled Castes and Scheduled Tribes make up 20,722 (7.30%) and 179,662 (63.27%) of the population respectively.

Languages of Mohla-Manpur district (2011)
1. Chhattisgarhi (70.3%)
2. Gondi (20.1%)
3. Hindi (5.02%)
4. Halbi (3.26%)
5. Others (1.30%)

At the time of the 2011 Census of India, 70.27% of the population in the district spoke Chhattisgarhi, 20.15% Gondi, 5.02% Hindi and 3.26% Halbi as their first language.
