= Prem Nagar, Chhattisgarh =

Prem Nagar is a "Nagar panchayat" area of Pilkha constituency of Chhattisgarh state in India and is a part of the Surajpur District. Prem Nagar is nearly 51 km northeast from Surajpur and 91 km from Ambikapur, which is its nearest big city.

== See also ==
- Surajpur District
