= Ramanuj Nagar =

Coordinates: 21°48′N 86°44′E

Ramanuj Nagar is a "Nagar panchayat" area of Premnagar constituency of chhattisgarh in India and is a part of the Surajpur District. Ramanuj Nagar is about 21 km northeast from Surajpur and is 60 km away from Ambikapur; the nearest big city.

== See also ==
- Surajpur District
