= Surguja State =

Princely state of Central India

Coordinates: 23°12′N 83°2′E

- Princely State of British India
- 1613–1948
- Flag

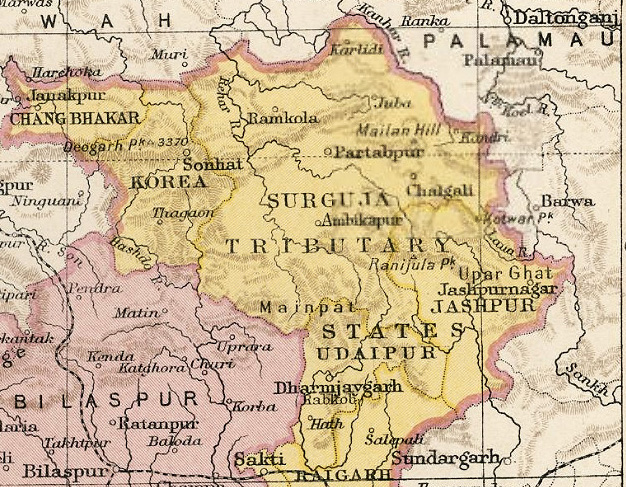
- Surguja State in the Imperial Gazetteer of India
- Capital: Ambikapur
- Area
  - 1901: 15,770 km^{2} (6,090 sq mi)
- Population
  - 1901: 351,011
- History
  - Established: 1613
  - Accession to the Union of India: 1948
Preceded by	Succeeded by
Maratha Empire	India

Surguja State was one of the main princely states of Central India during the period of the British Raj, even though it was not entitled to any gun salute. Formerly, it was placed under the Central India Agency, but in 1905 it was transferred to the Eastern States Agency.

The state spread over a vast mountainous area inhabited by many different people groups such as the Gond, Bhumij, Oraon, Panika, Korwa, Bhuiya, Kharwar, Munda, Chero, Rajwar, Nagesia and Santal. Its former territory lies in the present-day state of Chhattisgarh and its capital was the town of Ambikapur, now the capital of Surguja district.

== History ==
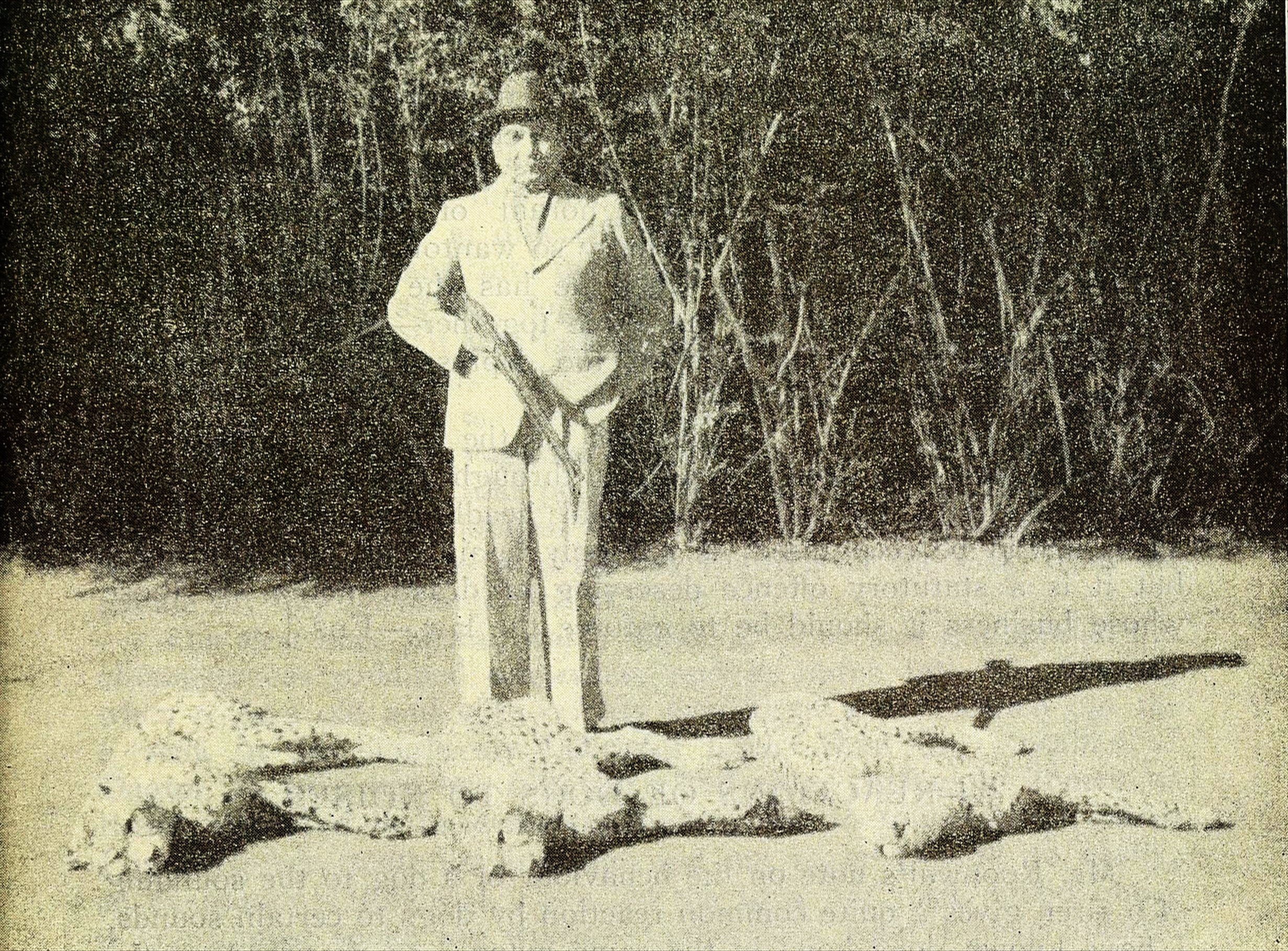
Three of the last Asiatic cheetahs recorded from India were shot down in 1947, by Maharaja Ramanuj Pratap Singh Deo of Koriya, as seen in this photo submitted by his private secretary to JBNHS.

The family of the Maharaja is very ancient, and is stated to belong to the Rajputs of the Lunar race.The family is descended from ruling family of a Raksel Raja of Palamau. The state became a British protectorate in 1818 after the Third Anglo-Maratha War. Neighbouring Udaipur State was founded in 1818 as an offshoot of Surguja State. In 1860 The State was conferred to younger son of Maharaja Amar Singh Deo, to Raja Bahadur Bindeshwari Prasad Singh Deo CSI. The Chief resided at PratappurPratappur, the headquarters of a tract which he held as a maintenance grant in Surguja, and was a ruler of considerable ability and force of character. In 1871 he aided in the suppression of a rebellion in the Keonjhar State, for which he received the thanks of Government, and gifts of an elephant with gold-embroidered trappings and a gold watch and chain. He obtained the title of Raja Bahadur as a personal distinction, and was also made a Companion of the Most Exalted Order of the Star of India. In 1820 hereditary title of Maharaja was conferred on ruling chief of Surguja. Surguja was one of the Chota Nagpur States and its rulers were Rajputs of the Raksel dynasty. They were the de facto overlords of the smaller states of Udaipur, Jashpur, Koriya (Korea) and Changbhakar that were fringing its territory.

Maharaja Indrajit Singh Deo (1827–1879) of Surguja was described as a lunatic by Anglo-Indian writer George Robert Aberigh-Mackay in 1877.

Maharaja Ramanuj Saran Singh Deo, the last ruler of this princely state signed the accession to the Indian Union on 1 January 1948. The Maharaja has the notorious record of having shot and killed a total of 1710 Bengal tigers, the highest known individual score; he doesn't hold the official record of shooting into extinction 3 of the last physically recorded Asiatic cheetahs in India, effectively making the species almost locally extinct in 1947, considering that a female was spotted in what was to be the District of Korea in 1951. The last three Asiatic Cheetas were shot by Maharaja Ramanuj Partap Singh Deo of Korea.

=== Rulers ===
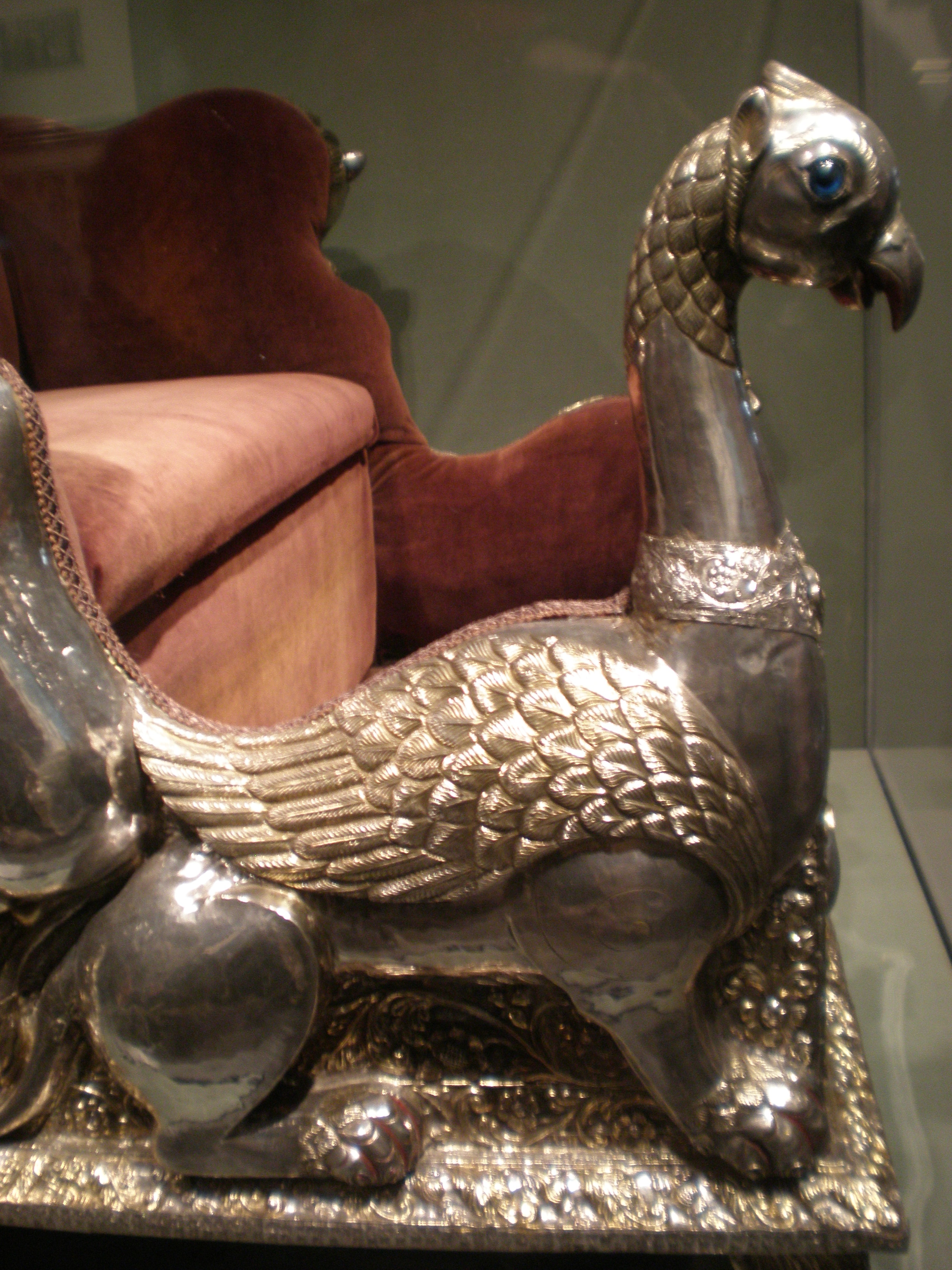
Detail of the throne of the Maharaja of Surguja.

The rulers of Surguja State bore the title of 'Maharaja', although a few had the title of 'Maharaja Bahadoor', including the last head of the state.

==== Rajas ====
- 1678 – 1709 Baiha Dadu Singh Deo
- 1709 – 1728 Balbhadra Singh I Deo
- 1728 – 1749 Jaswat Singh Deo
- 1749 – 1758 Bahadur Sigh Deo
- 1760 – 17.. Sheo Singh Deo
- 1792 – 1799 Ajit Singh Deo
- 1799 – 1800 Balbhadra Singh II Deo (1st time)
- 1800 – 1813 Lal Singram Singh Deo
- 1813 – 1816 Balbhadra Singh II Deo (2nd time)
- 1816 – 1820 interregnum
- 1820 – 1851 Lal Amar Singh Deo (from 1820 with hereditary style Maharaja)
- 1851 – 25 March 1879 Indrajit Singh Deo (b. 1827 – d. 1879)
- 25 Mar 1879 – 31 December 1917 Raghunath Saran Singh Deo (b. 1860 – d. 1917) (from 1887 with personal style Maharaja; from 1896 Maharaja Bahadur)
- 31 Dec 1917 – 1918 Ramanuj Saran Singh Deo (b. 1895 – d. 1965) (with hereditary style Maharaja)

==== Maharaja ====
- 1820–1851 : Lal Amar Singh Deo (from 1820 with hereditary style Maharaja)
- 1851–25 March 1879 : Indrajit Singh Deo (b. 1827 – d. 1879) (Maharaja Bahadur)
- 25 Mar 1879–31 December 1917 : Raghunath Saran Singh Deo (b. 1860 – d. 1917) (from 1887 with personal style Maharaja; from 1896 Maharaja Bahadur)
- 1917–15 August 1947 : Ramanuj Saran Singh Deo (Maharaja Bahadur)
- 1947–2001 : Madneshwar Saran Singh Deo (Titular Maharaja)
- 2001–Incumbent : T. S. Singh Deo (Titular Maharaja)

== See also ==
- Balrampur district, Uttar Pradesh
- Bhaiyathan
- Bilaspur district, Chhattisgarh
- Chota Nagpur States
- Eastern States Agency
- Political integration of India
- Rehar River
- Surajpur district
