= Odagi =

Odagi is a town and a "Nagar Panchayat" in Surajpur district in the Indian state of Chhattisgarh. Odagi is about 20 km northeast from Surajpur town and is 75 km away from Ambikapur; the nearest big city.

== See also ==
- Surajpur District
