= Akshat Gupta =

Indian writer

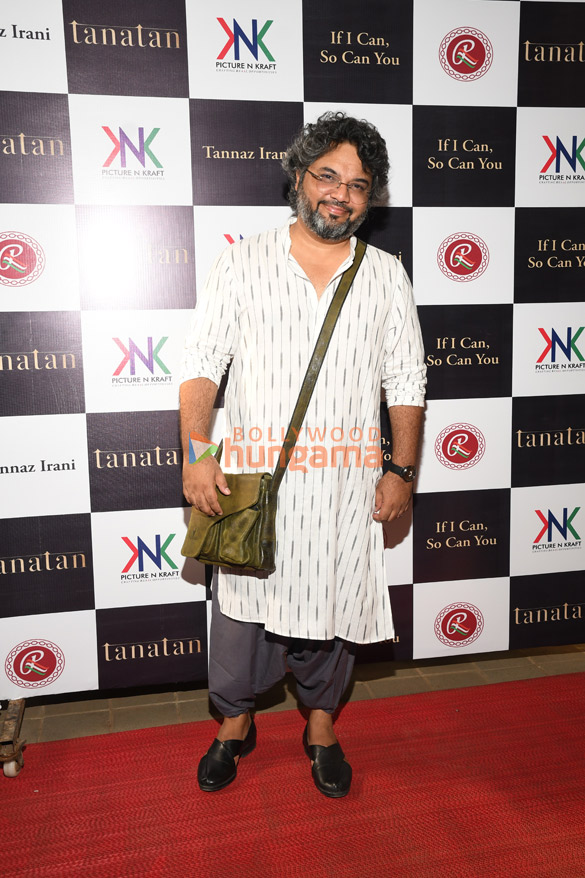
- Born: 2 April; Ambikapur, Chhattisgarh, India
- Occupations: Writer, screenwriter, motivational speaker, lyricist, and poet
- Notable work: The Hidden Hindu

Akshat Gupta is an Indian writer, screenwriter, motivational speaker, lyricist, poet and restaurateur. He is best known for his national best selling mythological, science fiction and adventurous The Hidden Hindu trilogy series.

== Early life and education ==
Akshat was born in Ambikapur, Chhattisgarh, India.

== Adaptations based on Gupta's work ==
Dhoni Production House is producing a web series based on Gupta's book The Hidden Hindu. Bake My Cake Production is also making a movie on his book Naga Warriors.

== Bibliography ==
=== Books ===
- We Were Friends. Blue Rose Publishers, 2016, ISBN 978-9386126030
- Concealed Existence: Unconcealed. Partridge India, 2016, ISBN 978-1482874532
- Kismet or Karma: Unleash the Mystery. AKS Publishing House, 2020, ISBN 978-8194646815
- The Hidden Hindu: Book 1. Penguin eBury Press, 2021, ISBN 978-0143455691
- The Hidden Hindu: Book 2. Penguin eBury Press, 2022, ISBN 978-0143456544
- The Hidden Hindu: Book 3. Penguin eBury Press, 2023, ISBN 978-0143456551
- The Naga Warriors: Battle of Gokul Vol. 1, 2024, ISBN 978-0143465935
- The Naga Warriors 2: Battle of Gokul Vol 2, 2025, ISBN 978-01434365942

=== Akshat Gupta Books In Marathi ===
- Hidden Hindu (All Parts) In Marathi
