= Mohla =

Census town in Chhattisgarh, India

Mohla is a census town in the Indian state of Chhattisgarh. It serves as the district headquarter of the newly created Mohla-Manpur-Ambagarh Chowki district.

The population of the town is 4,952. It is situated 75 km away from Rajnandgaon and 25 km away from Ambagarh chowki.
