= Gharghoda =

- town
- Location in Chhattisgarh, India Gharghoda (India)
- Coordinates: 22.17°N 83.35°E
- Country: chattisgarthIndia
- State: Chhattisgarh
- District: Raigarh
- Elevation: 258 m (846 ft)

Population (2001)
  - Total: 8,103

Languages
  - Official: Hindi, Chhattisgarhi
- Time zone: UTC+5:30 (IST)
- Vehicle registration: CG

Gharghoda is a town and a nagar panchayat in Raigarh district in the state of Chhattisgarh, India. Here you can explore various tourist places in Gharghoda.

== Geography ==
Gharghoda is located at 22.17°N 83.35°E. It has an average elevation of 258 metres (846 feet).

== Demographics ==
As of 2001 India census, Gharghoda had a population of 8103. Males constitute 50% of the population and females 50%. Gharghoda has an average literacy rate of 65%, higher than the national average of 59.5%: male literacy is 76%, and female literacy is 54%.
