= Basdei =

- village
- Location in Chhattisgarh, India Basdei (India)
- Coordinates: 23°18′1″N 82°52′7″E
- Country: India
- State: Chhattisgarh

Languages
  - Official: Hindi, Chhattisgarhi
- Time zone: UTC+5:30 (IST)
- Vehicle registration: CG

Basdei is a village in India. It is located in Surajpur District in the state of Chhattisgarh. Surajpur district was declared a district on 15 August 2011 by the State Chief Minister Dr. Raman Singh along with eight other new districts. Basdei village was formerly part of Surguja district. This village is known in the region for Jawahar Navodaya Vidyalaya, a school.
