= Khamhria =

Than-Khamhria
- Town
- Location in Chhattisgarh, India Than-Khamhria (India)
- Coordinates: 20.98°N 82.27°E
- Country: India
- State: Chhattisgarh
- District: Bemetara
- Elevation: 332 m (1,089 ft)

Population (2001)
  - Total: 6,798

Languages
  - Official: Hindi, Chhattisgarhi
- Time zone: UTC+5:30 (IST)
- Vehicle registration: CG

Khamhria is a town and a nagar panchayat in Bemetara district in the Indian state of Chhattisgarh.

== Geography ==
Than-Khamhria is located at 20.98°N 82.27°E. It has an average elevation of 332 m (1,089 ft).

== Demographics ==
As of 2001 India census, Than-Khamhria had a population of 6798. Males constitute 51% of the population and females 49%. Than-Khamhria has an average literacy rate of 63%, higher than the national average of 59.5%: male literacy is 72%, and female literacy is 53%. In Than-Khamhria, 14% of the population is under 6 years of age.
