= Naya Baradwar =

Naya Baradwar Baradwar
- Town
- Nickname: BUA
- Location in Chhattisgarh, India Naya Baradwar (India)
- Coordinates: 21.99757°N 82.81635°E
- Country: India
- State: Chhattisgarh
- District: Janjgir-Champa
- Founder: Pravin Kumar
- Named for: Pravin Kumar

Population (2011)
  - Total: 10,262

Languages
  - Official: Hindi, Chhattisgarhi
- Time zone: UTC+5:30 (IST)
- Postal code: 495687
- Vehicle registration: CG 11

Naya Baradwar is a town and a nagar panchayat in Janjgir-Champa district in the Indian state of Chhattisgarh.

== Demographics ==
As of 2011 India census, Naya Baradwar had a population of 10262. Males constitute 51% of the population and females 49%. Naya Baradwar has an average literacy rate of 66%, higher than the national average of 59.5%: male literacy is 77%, and female literacy is 55%. In Naya Baradwar, 14% of the population is under 6 years of age.
