= Pratappur, Chhattisgarh =

Town in Chhattisgarh, India

Pratappur is a "Nagar panchayat" area in the Surajpur District of Chhattisgarh in India. Pratappur is 45 kilometres (28 mi) from Ambikapur, the nearest large city.
