= Rihand River =

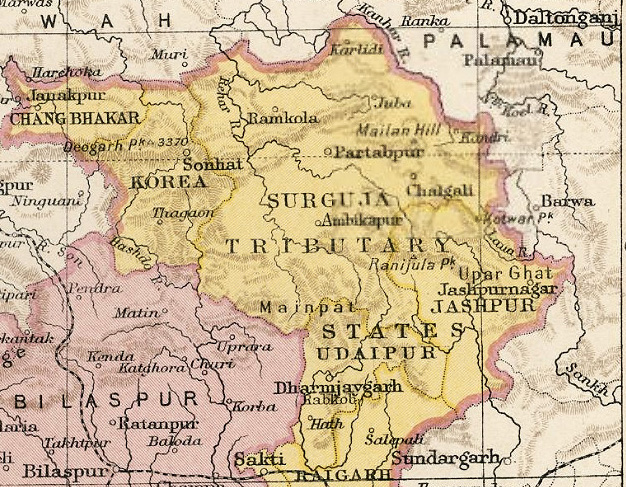
- Map in the Imperial Gazetteer of India showing Rehar River and Surguja State.

Location
- Country: India
- State: Chhattisgarh, Madhya Pradesh, Uttar Pradesh

Physical characteristics
- Source: Matiranga hills
  - location: Surguja district, Surajpur district, Chhattisgarh
- Mouth: Son River
  - location: Uttar Pradesh, Sonbhadra district
  - coordinates: 24°31′52″N 82°59′57″E
- Discharge
  - location: Son River

The Rihand River (also referred to as Renu, Renuka, Rend, Rer or Rehar) is a tributary of the Son River and flows through the Indian states of Chhattisgarh, Madhya Pradesh and Uttar Pradesh. Its old name was Renu or Renuka.

== Course ==
The Rihand rises from Matiranga hills, in the region south west of the Mainpat plateau, which is about 1,100 meters above mean sea level. The river flows north roughly through the central part of Surguja & Surajpur district for 160 kilometres (99 mi). The Rihand and its tributaries form a fertile plain in the central part of the district stretching from its origin to Lakhanpur, Surajpur, Pratappur. Thereafter, it flows north into Sonbhadra district of Uttar Pradesh via Singrauli district of Madhya Pradesh, where it is called Rhed and finally joins the Son.

=== Tributaries ===
it is principal tributaries in Surajpur district are the Mahan, the Morana (Morni), the Geur, the Gagar, the Gobri, the Piparkachar, the Ramdia and the Galphulla. Many seasonal and perennial rivers join the Rihand reservoir such as the Kanchan, the Mayar and the Azir of Singrauli district of Madhya Pradesh.

== Rihand Dam ==
The Rihand Dam was constructed across the Rihand River near Pipri in Sonbhadra district of Mirzapur division in 1962 for hydropower generation; the reservoir impounded behind the dam is called Govind Ballabh Pant Sagar. Nearest railway station is Renukoot.

== Rashganda Fall ==
Rihand River has a fall named 'Rakasganda', in its journey in Surajpur district of Chhatishgarh. This fall is important for tourist point of view.

== See also ==
- List of rivers in India
- Tourism in Chhattisgarh
