= Bhatgaon, Raipur =

Bhatgaon
- Town
- Location in Chhattisgarh, India Bhatgaon (India)
- Coordinates: 21.15°N 81.7°E
- Country: India
- State: Chhattisgarh
- District: Raipur
- Elevation: 287 m (942 ft)

Population (2001)
  - Total: 8,221

Languages
  - Official: Hindi, Chhattisgarhi
- Time zone: UTC+5:30 (IST)
- Vehicle registration: CG

Bhatgaon is a town and a Nagar Panchayat in Raipur district in the state of Chhattisgarh, India.

== Geography ==
Bhatgaon is located at 21.15°N 81.7°E. It has an average elevation of 287 metres (941 feet).

== Demographics ==
As of the 2001 India census, Bhatgaon had a population of 8221. Males constituted 50% of the population and females 50%. Bhatgaon had an average literacy rate of 59%, lower than the national average of 59.5%; with male literacy of 73% and female literacy of 46%. 15% of the population was under 6 years of age.
