= Bishrampur, Chhattisgarh =

Bishrampur Vishrampur
- Town
- Location in Chhattisgarh, India Bishrampur (India)
- Coordinates: 23.18967°N 83.0047°E
- Country: India
- State: Chhattisgarh
- District: Surajpur

Government
  - Body: Nagar Panchayat Bishrampur
  - Chairman: Smt. Nirmala Rajesh Yadav (BJP)

Area
  - Total: 3.68 km^{2} (1.42 sq mi)
- Elevation: 536 m (1,759 ft)

Population (2011)
  - Total: 11,367
  - Density: 3,090/km^{2} (8,000/sq mi)

Languages
  - Official: Hindi, Chhattisgarhi
- Time zone: UTC+5:30 (IST)
- PIN: 497226
- Vehicle registration: CG-29

Bishrampur is a census town in Surajpur district in the Indian state of Chhattisgarh.

== Demographics ==
As of the 2011 census, Bishrampur had a population of 11,367. Males constitute 51.9%(5904) of the population and females 48.1%(5463). Bishrampur has an average literacy rate of 88%, higher than the national average of 74.04% and Chhattisgarh's average of 70.28%: male literacy is 92.98%, and female literacy is 82.67%. In Bishrampur, 10.2% of the population is under 6 years of age. The child sex ratio of Bishrampur is 801(F):1000(M), which is less than Chhattisgarh's sex ratio of 925(F):1000(M).

Bishrampur's economy mainly depends on coal mines. South Eastern Coalfields Limited is the only coal mining company, but various small factories and industries are in force. An Indian oil depot is also been situated along with regional head office of Food Corporation of India.

Bishrampur is a town and a nagar panchayat. It is 12 km south-east from the district headquarters at Surajpur. National Highway 43 passes through Bishrampur. Asia's largest drag-line machines for coal excavation are located in Bishrampur; they are named Shiv and Shakti. They were imported from United States of America in 1962.

== Education ==
Bishrampur has both government and private schools, using both Hindi and English as teaching languages.

There are two colleges: one is Shashakiya Mahavidyalaya. The second college is a private institution named Veena Girls College. Both colleges are affiliated to Surguja University, Ambikapur.

D.A.V. Public School, Carmel Convent School, Maharana Pratap Public school and Swami Vivekanand Senior Secondary School are those who use English as a teaching medium. Alok Mittal who was All India Topper of MAT Exam-February 2008 (Management Aptitude Test) through scoring 800/800 marks is an alumnus of DAV Public School.

There are also Hindi medium schools:

- Saraswati Sishu Mandir
- Saraswti Sishu Mandir Girls School
- Carmel Convent Hindi Medium School
- Swami Vivekanand Senior Secondary Hindi medium School
- Government Boys Higher Secondary School
- Rajkumar Public School
- Sharda Public School
- Aruna Public School
- Bharat Mata Public School

== Railway ==
There is a railway station 1 Km from the Bishrampur Market. The 18241 / 18242 Durg Ambikapur Express, the 11265 / 11266 Ambikapur Jabalpur Superfast Express pass through. Local trains, such as ABM, Ambikapur-Shahdol and Memu connecting with the cities Raipur, Anuppur, Bilaspur and Jabalpur.

== Recent Development ==
The construction of one public park Pushpa Vatika; Haat Baazar, a bus stand and a new Nagar Panchayat Bhawan, toilets under Swatch Bharat Mission and water supply system in some wards by the Nagar Panchayat (municipal council); and the Sai Baba Mandir by local religious groups. A new Government College is also built in Gorakhnathpur. A new temple of Sai baba is Also constructed.
