= Ambagarh Chowki =

Town in Chhattisgarh, India

Ambagarh Chowki Chowki
- Sub-Urban
- Ambagarh Chowki
- Nickname: Chowki
- Location in Chhattisgarh, India Ambagarh Chowki (India)
- Coordinates: 20.78209°N 80.74117°E
- Country: India
- State: Chhattisgarh
- District: Mohla-Manpur-Chowki

Population (2001)
  - Total: 8,494

Languages
  - Official: Hindi, Chhattisgarhi
- Time zone: UTC+5:30 (IST)
- PIN: 491665
- Vehicle registration: CG

Ambagarah Chowki is a town in the Chhattisgarh state of India. It is now a district in collaboration with Mohla and Manpur, naming the district Mohla-Manpur-Chowki.

== Geography ==
Ambagarh Chowki is located at the banks of Shivnath River (or Sheonath river). It is approximately 123.6 km (76.8 mi) from the capital of the state (Raipur) via NH 53 and approximately 51.2 km (31.8 mi) from the previous district Rajnandgaon. The town consist of many hillocks, on some of which temples were built. The commercial vegetation here consist of Mahua trees (Scientific name: Madhuca longifolia), and Tendu trees (Scientific name : Diospyros melanoxylon) whose leaves are picked by the people licensed by the government tenders, which is later used to make beedi.

== Demographics ==
As per the 2011 census of India, Ambagarh Chowki had a population of 9889, of which males constituted 49% and females constituted 51% of the total population. The sex satio was reported as 1039 females for every 1000 males as against the state average of 991. Ambagarh Chowki has an average literacy rate of 87.2%, higher than the state average of 70.28%; with 93.16% of the males and 83.8% of females literate. 11.71% of the population is under 6 years of age.
