= Baikunthpur, Chhattisgarh =

Baikunthpur
- Town
- Location in Chhattisgarh, India Baikunthpur (India)
- Coordinates: 23.25°N 82.55°E
- Country: India
- State: Chhattisgarh
- District: Koriya
- Elevation: 556 m (1,824 ft)

Population (2011)
  - Total: 28,431

Languages
  - Official: Hindi, Chhattisgarhi
- Time zone: UTC+5:30 (IST)
- PIN: 497335
- Area code: 7836
- Vehicle registration: CG-16

Baikunthpur is a town, a Nagar Palika and a notified area committee in Koriya District in the state of Chhattisgarh, India. It is the administrative headquarters of Koriya district.

== Geography ==
Baikunthpur is located at 23.25°N 82.55°E. It has an average elevation of 529 metres (1735 feet).

== Demographics ==
The Baikunthpur Municipality has population of 28,431 of which 14,749 are males while 13,682 are females as per report released by Census India 2011. Baikunthpur has an average literacy rate of 78%, higher than the national average of 59.5%; with 57% of the males and 43% of females literate. 13% of the population is under 6 years of age.

== Culture and industry ==
Coal India has a GM office of SECL in Baikunthpur, (SECL - a wholly owned subsidiary of CIL). This area has rich coal resources with other GM offices and has many profitable coal mines, namely Churcha Coalmines.
