= Bhatgaon, Surajpur =

Town In Chhattisgarh, India

Bhatgaon
- Town
- Bhatgaon
- Location in Chhattisgarh, India Bhatgaon (India)
- Coordinates: 23.35794°N 82.98259°E
- Country: India
- State: Chhattisgarh
- District: Surajpur district

Government
  - Type: Mayor—Councilor
  - Body: Nagar Panchayat Bhatgaon
  - MLA: Laxmi Rajwade (BJP)

Area
  - Total: 12.74 km^{2} (4.92 sq mi)
- Elevation: 540 m (1,770 ft)

Population (2011)
  - Total: 11,204
  - Density: 879.4/km^{2} (2,278/sq mi)

Languages
  - Official: Hindi, Chhattisgarhi
- Time zone: UTC+5:30 (IST)
- PIN: 497235
- Area code: 07775
- Vehicle registration: CG-29

Bhatgaon is a Census town and Nagar Panchayat in Surajpur district in the Indian state of Chhattisgarh. Bhatgaon is known for its South Eastern Coalfields Limited, (Bhatgaon Colliery).

As of Swachh Survekshan 2020 Zonal Ranking (cities up to 25 K) - East Zone. Nagar Panchayat Bhatgaon is in 13th position.

== Place Of Interest ==
1) Shiv Mandir

2) Hanuman Mandir

3) Sai Mandir

4) Kali Badi

5) NWGEL Church

6) GEl Church

7) Coal Handling Plant

8) Satkar SECL Guest house

9) Durga Mandir

10) Neeli Jheel OCM

11) 20 MW SECL BVG Solar Power Plant

== Demographics And Education ==
The Bhatgaon town is divided into 15 wards for which elections are held every five years. The Bhatgaon Nagar Panchayat has population of 11,204 of which 5,792 are males while 5,412 are females as per report released by Census India 2011. The population of children aged 0-6 is 1423 which is 12.70% of total population of Bhatgaon (NP). In Bhatgaon Nagar Panchayat, the female sex ratio is 934 against state average of 991. Moreover, the child sex ratio in Bhatgaon is around 1024 compared to Chhattisgarh state average of 969. The literacy rate of Bhatgaon town is 78.91% higher than the state average of 70.28%. In Bhatgaon, male literacy is around 85.62% while the female literacy rate is 71.63%.

Bhatgaon Nagar Panchayat has total administration over 2,403 houses to which it supplies basic amenities like water and sewerage. It is also authorize to build roads within Nagar Panchayat limits and impose taxes on properties coming under its jurisdiction.

Bhatgaon has both government and private schools, using both Hindi and English as teaching languages.

- Saraswati Sishu Mandir
- Government Boys Higher Secondary School
- D.A.V Public School
- St. Charles HS School
- Government Girls Higher Secondary School
- City Public School
- Shalom Mission School
- A.D Jubilee Memorial School
