= Ambikapur, Chhattisgarh =

City in Surguja district, India

Ambikapur
- City
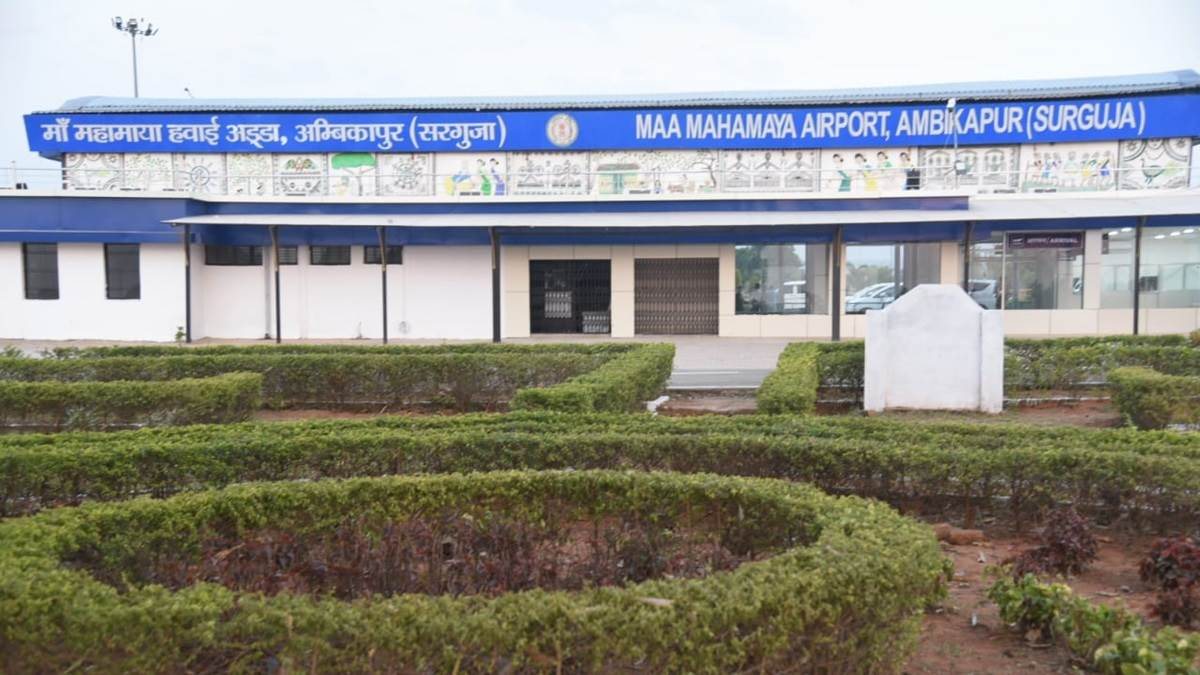
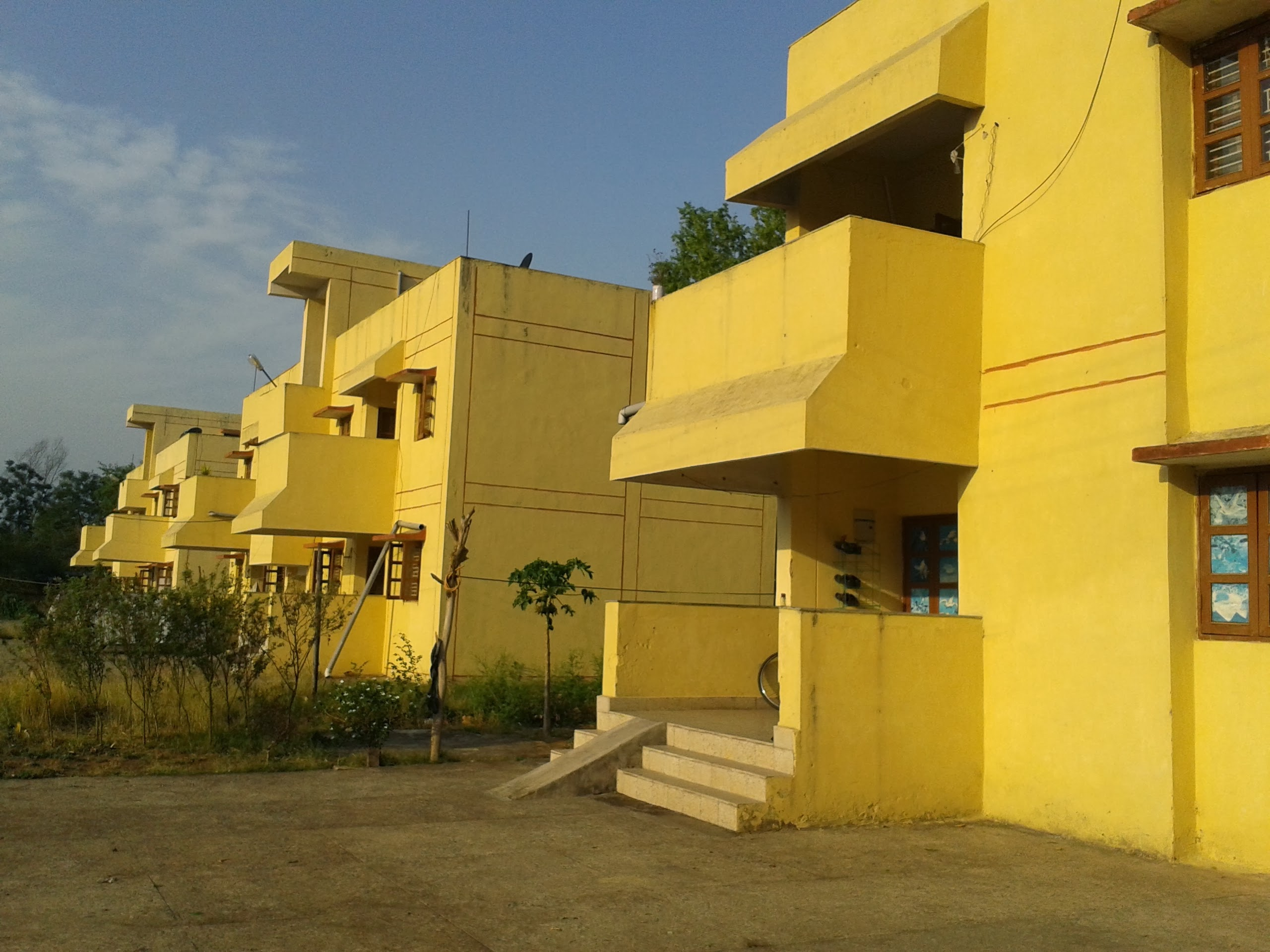
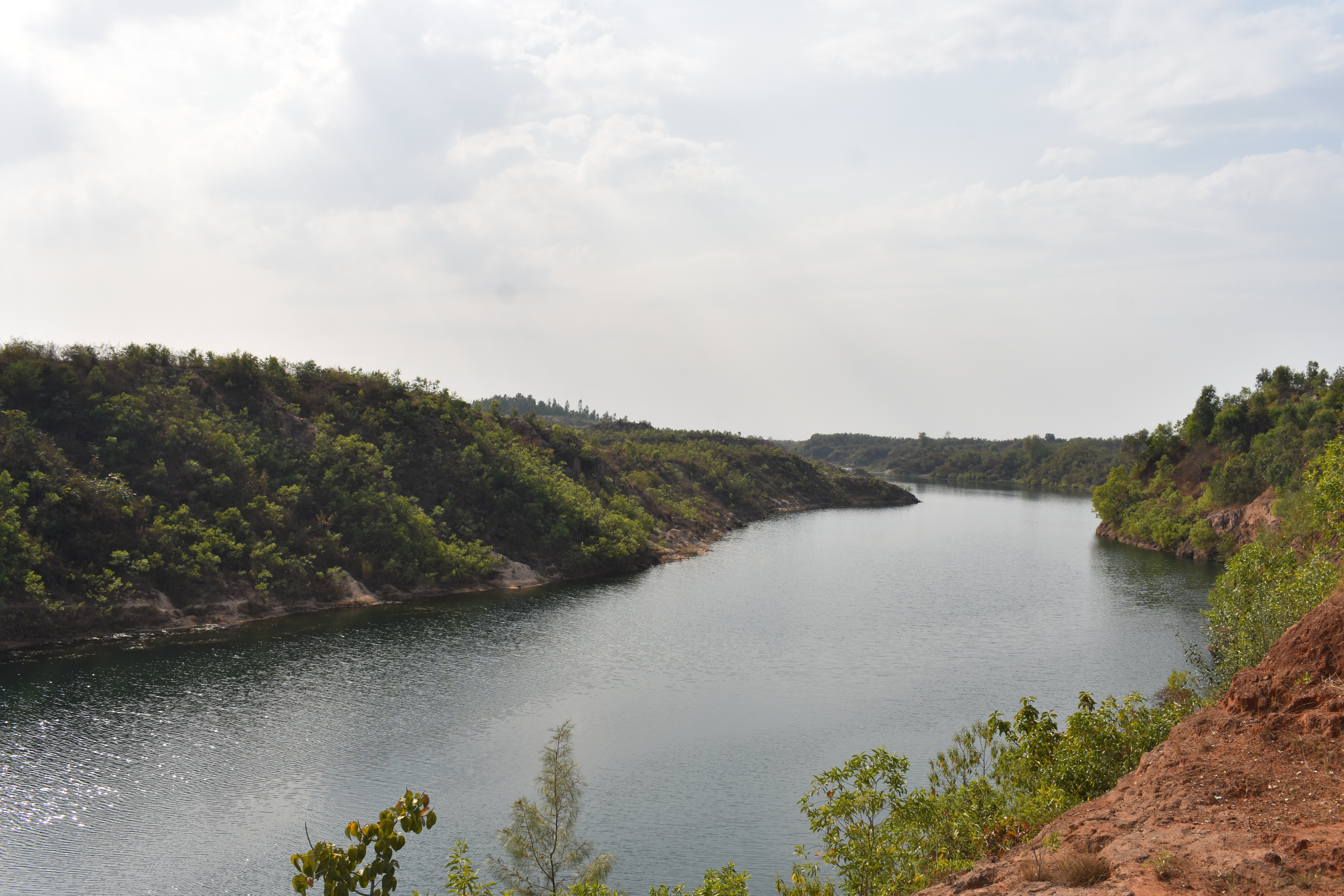
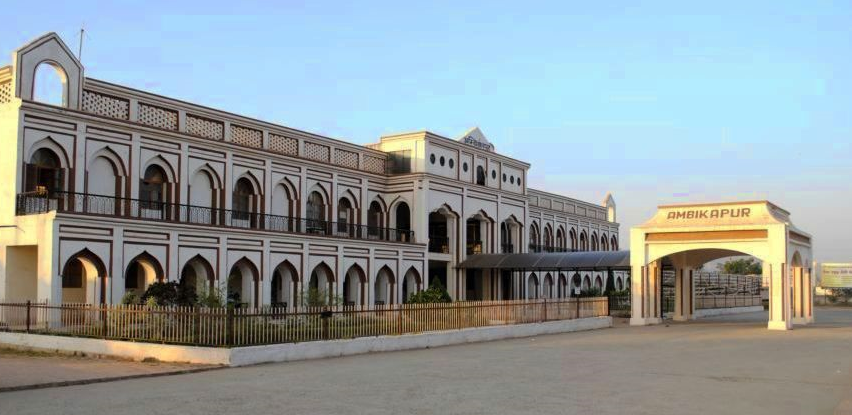
- From top: Ambikapur Airport, Ambikapur Railway station, Reservoir in Hasdeo, Building in Ambikapur

- Location in Chhattisgarh Ambikapur (India)
- Coordinates: 23.12°N 83.2°E
- Country: India
- State: Chhattisgarh
- District: Surguja
- Named for: Mahamaya Temple

Government
  - Body: Municipal corporation (India)
  - Mayor: Smt. Manjusha Bhagat (BJP)

Area
  - Total: 35.36 km^{2} (13.65 sq mi)
- Elevation: 623 m (2,044 ft)

Population (2011)
  - Total: 243,173
  - Rank: 6th (In Chhattisgarh) • 192nd (In India)
  - Density: 42/km^{2} (110/sq mi)
- Demonym: Ambikapurian

Languages
  - Official: Hindi, Chhattisgarhi
- Time zone: UTC+5:30 (IST)
- PIN: 497001
- Area code: 7774
- Vehicle registration: CG-15
- Website: surguja.nic.in nagarnigamambikapur.co.in

Ambikapur is a city and headquarters of Surguja district in the Indian state of Chhattisgarh. It is one of the oldest cities in the state, in east-central India. Ambikapur is also the divisional headquarters of Surguja Division which consists of the six districts of Surguja, Korea, Manendragarh, Balrampur, Surajpur and Jashpur.

Ambikapur was the capital of the princely state of Surguja before Indian Independence. The name of the city is derived from the Hindu goddess Ambika (Mahamaya) Devi, who is the central figure of worship for the Hindus in the area. The area under Ambikapur Municipal Corporation is 35.360 km^{2}.

== Geography ==
Ambikapur is located at 23°12′N 83°2′E. It has an average elevation of 623 metres (2078 feet). The district is spread over a forest-rich area of 22,237 km^{2}. Most of the district's terrain is forested and hilly. Natural resources include bauxite, forest products and paddy crops.

=== Land ===
The land is classified into six categories. About 41.67% is under agriculture, while about 5.70% remains fallow. A further 11.44% of the land could be brought under cultivation by improvements in farming techniques and reclamation of marginal areas. A further 1.27% is barren and uncultivated while 33.09% is forest cover and 6.83% is covered by buildings, roads and other infrastructure.

This distribution of cultivated land reflects the patterns and intensity of early agricultural practices and the extent of the population, combined with physical factors. Areas with a high concentration of cultivated land are generally those with longer histories of settlement and agricultural use.

== Demographics ==
As per the 2011 census, Ambikapur had a population of 121,071. The municipality had a sex ratio of 920 females per 1,000 males and 11.3% of the population was under six years old. Effective literacy was 88.20%; male literacy was 92.73% and female literacy was 83.29%.

Religion in Ambikapur City
	Percent
Hinduism	79.07%
Islam	11.46%
Christianity	8.21%
Others	1.27%

Ambikapur is inhabited by people from across India. Moderate weather makes it an attractive place for settlement. Unlike the capital, the district population comprises aboriginal populations including the Pandos and Korwas, who still live in rural areas.

Mainpat near Ambikapur is home to a significant number of Tibetan migrants who took refuge in India after the Chinese annexation of Tibet in 1959.

== Government and politics ==
The first reported garbage cafe opened in 2019 in Ambikapur near the city's main bus station. The cafe is run by an individual on behalf of the Ambikapur Municipal Corporation (AMC).The cafe's slogan is "more waste between taste", and they offer 1 kilogram of plastic could be exchanged for a full lunch or dinner, and 500 grams for breakfast. Additionally, the plastic collected by the Ambikapur Municipal Corporation (AMC) will be used to construct roads.

Amikapur’s waste management system is an important part of its cleanliness initiative. For instance, for solid waste management, the AMC integrated non-government organisations (NGOs) and self-help groups (SHGs) into door-to-door collection and waste segregation. The city also set up Solid and Liquid Resource Management Centres (SLRM) to segregate waste.

The city is part of the Sarguja Lok Sabha constituency represented by Member of Parliament Chintamani Maharaj from the BJP, and in the state assembly through the Ambikapur Assembly constituency, represented by MLA Rajesh Agrawal from the Bhartiya Janata Party.

=== Civic administration ===
The Ambikapur Municipality was established in 1936 during the Surguja State era at the initiative of Maharani Vijayeshwari Devi. After visiting Kolkata with Maharaja Ramanujsharan Singhdeo and observing its municipal sanitation system, she arranged for sanitation equipment to be brought from Kolkata to Ambikapur then a town of around seven thousand people, and introduced buffalo-cart garbage collection modeled on Kolkata's system. The municipal office was set up at Maharani Vijayeshwari Devi's Jubilee Dharamshala at Mahamaya Chowk. Lal Ramanuj Pratap Singh was nominated as the municipality's first president, though the Maharani herself is regarded as its founding figure. In 1999, Kamala Tripathi became the only woman elected president of the Municipal Council through direct elections. Ambikapur has since grown into a city of about 150,000, governed by an elected mayor.

The Ambikapur Municipal Corporation was upgraded from a Nagar Parishad and established in 2003. The Nagar Nigam Ambikapur is administered under the Chhattisgarh Municipal Corporation Act,1956. The municipal corporation has two parts, elected body and administrative body. The elected body is headed by the Mayor Manjusa Bhagat from the Bharatiya Janata Party. The last election to Ambikapur Municipal Corporation took place in 2025. Vinay Agarwal is the Municipal Commissioner of the Ambikapur Municipal Corporation. The city is divided into 48 wards and each ward is represented by a councillor directly elected by the people from the ward. The mayor of the city is elected indirectly from amongst the councillors. There are various national level programmes implemented in Ambikapur such as Regional Connectivity Scheme – UDAN, PMAY-U, Swachh Bharat Mission - Urban.

=== Civic utilities ===
Electricity is supplied by the state's Chhattisgarh State Power Distribution Company Limited. Ambikapur Municipal Corporation supplies 10.6 MLD of water to the city. Drinking water was initially sourced from the Banki Dam, but after pipeline expansion and construction of an automatic filter plant in Katkalo under the AMRUT scheme, in 2020 will also be sourced from the Ghughutta Dam in Nawagarh. The city has a total of 16 tanks for this purpose.

The municipal corporation is responsible for the solid waste management of the city. Ambikapur generates 45 metric tons of solid waste everyday, 90% of which is segregated through a decentralised waste management model. Household waste is collected door-to-door by 447 SHG women of 48 wards. The city has achieved 100% segregation of waste at the household level. It has no landfills and has been declared a zero-waste city since it converted its 15-acre landfill into a park in 2016. Ambikapur has implemented Solid Liquid Resource Management (SLRM) for disposal of municipal solid waste. There is no sewerage system in the city. Toilets are linked to individual septic tanks.

In the Ambikapur block 74.51% of the total geographical area is cultivated. The Ambikapur Development Plan 2021 (Draft) was created by the Chhattisgarh Directorate of Town and Country Planning.

== Transport ==
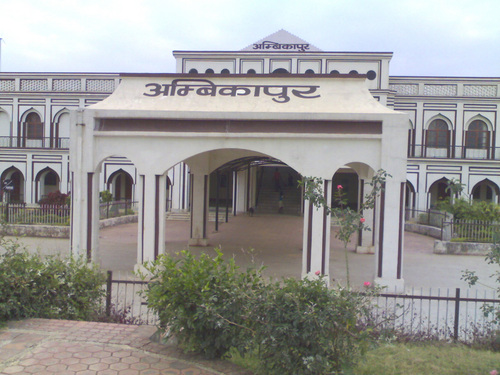
Ambikapur Railway Station Front

=== Rail ===
Ambikapur railway station is connected to the Anuppur railway junction, a bordering town in Madhya Pradesh, by a broad gauge railway. Trains reach Ambikapur from Delhi, Katni, Satna, Jabalpur, Durg, Bhopal and the state capital Raipur. More destinations, such as New Delhi, can be reached from Anuppur railway junction.

Ambikapur - Delhi Special, Jabalpur - Ambikapur Express, Ambikapur – Shahdol, Ambikapur – Surajpur – Anuppur – Bilaspur – Raipur – Durg Express and Bhopal – Chirmiri Passenger run from major cities such as Delhi, Bhopal, Gwalior, Katni, Raipur and Jabalpur.

=== Road ===
Ambikapur is well connected by road to other major cities of Chhattisgarh such as Raipur, Bilaspur, Durg, Bhilai, Korba and Raigarh. Daily bus services also run for Varanasi, prayagraj, Renukoot in U.P (170 km), Raipur (345 km) and Garhwa in Jharkhand, Aurangabad in Bihar. Bus services from Anuppur to Ambikapur operate via Manendragarh and Surajpur. The bus journeys from Bilaspur and Anuppur take between five and six hours.

=== Air ===
Ambikapur Airport, now Maa Mahamaya Airport, is located at Darima, 12 km (7.5 mi) south of Ambikapur. The airport up-gradation work was finished in May 2023 at a cost of Rs. 48 crore from category 2C to 3C, to enable operations of 70-72 seater aircraft under the UDAN Scheme, making this the fourth public airport in Chhattisgarh after Raipur, Jagdalpur and Bilaspur.

== Climate ==
Climate data for Ambikapur, Chhattisgarh, elevation 611 m (2,005 ft), (1991–2020, extremes 1951–2012)
Month	Jan	Feb	Mar	Apr	May	Jun	Jul	Aug	Sep	Oct	Nov	Dec	Year
Record high °C (°F)	30.5 (86.9)	34.8 (94.6)	39.7 (103.5)	43.8 (110.8)	44.8 (112.6)	44.9 (112.8)	38.4 (101.1)	36.1 (97.0)	35.7 (96.3)	34.5 (94.1)	32.4 (90.3)	29.5 (85.1)	44.9 (112.8)
Mean daily maximum °C (°F)	22.9 (73.2)	26.8 (80.2)	32.4 (90.3)	37.0 (98.6)	39.8 (103.6)	35.5 (95.9)	29.9 (85.8)	29.2 (84.6)	29.6 (85.3)	29.0 (84.2)	25.9 (78.6)	23.2 (73.8)	30.0 (86.0)
Mean daily minimum °C (°F)	9.0 (48.2)	12.0 (53.6)	16.4 (61.5)	21.3 (70.3)	25.2 (77.4)	24.9 (76.8)	23.3 (73.9)	23.0 (73.4)	22.1 (71.8)	18.3 (64.9)	13.2 (55.8)	8.9 (48.0)	18.1 (64.6)
Record low °C (°F)	0.9 (33.6)	2.5 (36.5)	7.8 (46.0)	10.6 (51.1)	16.1 (61.0)	17.2 (63.0)	16.4 (61.5)	19.8 (67.6)	15.7 (60.3)	9.4 (48.9)	4.2 (39.6)	1.7 (35.1)	0.9 (33.6)
Average rainfall mm (inches)	20.3 (0.80)	18.5 (0.73)	23.3 (0.92)	18.9 (0.74)	20.7 (0.81)	211.0 (8.31)	395.4 (15.57)	367.3 (14.46)	226.4 (8.91)	56.9 (2.24)	14.2 (0.56)	6.4 (0.25)	1,379.2 (54.30)
Average rainy days	1.9	1.6	2.0	1.8	2.1	9.7	16.8	16.5	11.0	3.6	1.1	0.5	68.5
Average relative humidity (%) (at 17:30 IST)	50	40	29	25	28	56	80	84	80	67	60	55	55
Source: India Meteorological Department

== Economy ==
The dominant industry of the region is mining of coal, bauxite, graphite, limestone, iron ore etc. combined with agriculture.

Ambikapur is home to a number of small and medium industrial units, including Bhavesh Mustard Oil Industry, Maa Sharda Industry, and OM SAI RAM Industry. The city also has manufacturing units such as Shivani Steel Fabrication Industries and VK Steel Industries. In addition, Shri Industry operates as an Ayurvedic third-party and herbal medicine manufacturer, while Shri Ram Industries is another local unit.

About 5.21 lakh tourists visited Ambikapur in 2024.

== Education ==
- Sarguja University Sant Gahira Guru Vishwavidyalaya Ambikapur
- Sainik School Ambikapur
- Govt. Rajeev Gandhi (Auto.) PG College
- Rajmata Shrimati Devendra Kumari Singhdeo Govt Medical College
- Government Engineering College Ambikapur
- Govt. Polytechnic college & ITI
- Govt Rajmohani Agriculture College
- Holy Cross College of Nursing
- Holy Cross Women's College
- Sai Baba Aadarsh College
- K R Technical College
- Oriental Public School
- Carmel School
- Sunrise Public School
- Montfort School, Ambikapur

== Media and communications ==
State-owned All India Radio has a local station in Ambikapur.

== Notable people ==
- T. S. Singh Deo
- Sunil Kumar Sinha
- Akshat Gupta

== Royal Palace ==
Surguja Palace, also known as Raghunath Palace, is located in Ambikapur. It is a white, two-storey palace. This palace is open to the public only on the day of Dussehra every year. In keeping with tradition, the heir of the royal family of Surguja meets and greets the visitors on Dussehra.

== See also ==
- Ambikapur constituency
- Sanjay park, Ambikapur
