= Koriya district =

Coordinates: 23°15′N 82°33′E

Koriya district Korea district
- District of Chhattisgarh
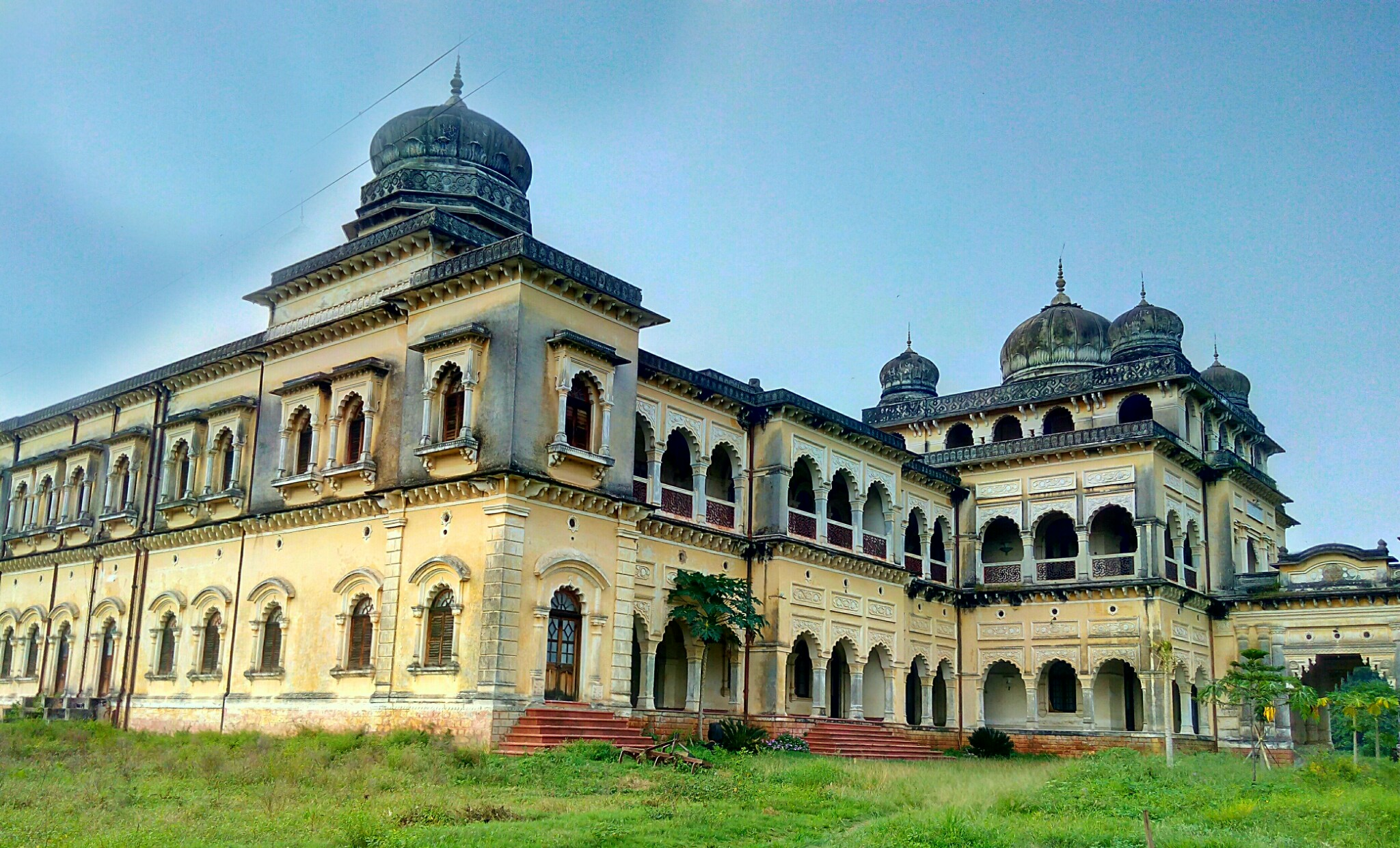
- Koriya Palace
- Interactive map of Koriya district
- Country: India
- State: Chhattisgarh
- Division: Surguja
- Headquarters: Baikunthpur
- Tehsils: 3

Government
  - Vidhan Sabha constituencies: 1

Area
  - Total: 6,604 km^{2} (2,550 sq mi)

Population (2011)
  - Total: 247,427
  - Density: 37.47/km^{2} (97.04/sq mi)

Demographics
  - Literacy: 71.41
  - Sex ratio: 971
- Time zone: UTC+05:30 (IST)
- PIN: 497xxx (Koriya)
- Major highways: 1
- Website: korea.gov.in

Koriya district, officially known as Korea district, is a district in the north-western part of the Chhattisgarh state in Central India.The administrative headquarters of the district is Baikunthpur.

== History ==
Little is known of the area before the 16th century. Koriya was a princely state of British Empire in India; the other princely state that lay within the Koriya district was Chang Bhakar. After Indian Independence in 1947, the rulers of Koriya and Chang Bhakar acceded to the Union of India on 1 January 1948 and both were made part of Surguja District of Madhya Pradesh state.

The district of Koriya came into existence on May 25, 1998, when it was carved out of Surguja district. After the formation of the new state of Chhattisgarh on November 1, 2000, Koriya District became part of the new state. It is currently a part of the Red Corridor.

== Geography ==
Koriya District lies between 22°56′ and 23°48′ North and 81°56′ and 82°47′ East. It is bounded on the north-west by Manendragarh-Chirmiri-Bharatpur district, on the south by Korba District, on the east by Surajpur District. The area of the district is 5977 km^{2}, of which 59.9% is forest area. The district is a vast mass of hill ranges. The general height of the lower tableland is 550 m (1800 feet) above sea level. The Sonhat Plateau has a maximum elevation of 755 m (2477 feet). The highest peak in the district is Deogarh, which is 1027 m (3370 feet) high.

The climate is mild with a monsoon, a mild summer and a bearable winter.

== Divisions ==
Koriya District consists of two subdivisions: Baikunthpur and Sonhat. The district encompasses 653 villages, 3 Janpad Panchayats, 236 gram Panchayats, 2 Nagar Panchayats and 1 municipality.

== Demographics ==
Religions in Koriya district (2011)
Religion	Percent
Hinduism	92.31%
Islam	3.95%
Other (Tribal religion)	1.92%
Christianity	1.61%
Other or not stated	0.21%
Distribution of religions

According to the 2011 census Koriya district has a population of 658,917, roughly equal to the nation of Montenegro or the US state of Vermont. This gives it a ranking of 510th in India (out of a total of 640). The district has a population density of 100 inhabitants per square kilometre (260/sq mi). Its population growth rate over the decade 2001-2011 was 12.4%. Koriya has a sex ratio of 968 females for every 1000 males, and a literacy rate of 71.41%.

After bifurcation, the district had a population of 247,427. 29.30% of the population lived in urban areas. Koriya has a sex ratio of 964 females per 1000 males. Scheduled Castes and Scheduled Tribes made up 20,437 (8.30%) and 97,124 (39.25%) of the population respectively.

According to the 2001 census, the total population of the district was 586,327 out of which 51.38% were male and 48.62% were female, 70.2% of this population was rural and 29.8% were urban, 8.2% belonged to the scheduled castes and 44.4% belonged to the scheduled tribes. Literacy rate was 63.1%, the male literacy rate being 75.7% and female literacy being 49.7%.

The original inhabitants of Korea district were the Kols, Gonds and Bhuinhars (Pando). All other communities in the district claim to have come from outside the district. Migration into Korea District was a continuous process. These migrants include the Cherva, Rajwars, Sahu, Ahir, Gwalas, Oraon, Gadaria (Gaderi), Koir, Bargah, Basods, Muslims, Kahars, Kunbi, Kewats, Guptas, Jaiswal, Schedule Caste, Agrawals, and Jains, and panika.

=== Languages ===
Languages in Koriya district (2011)
1. Surgujia (68.1%)
2. Hindi (20.6%)
3. Kurukh (3.14%)
4. Chhattisgarhi (1.74%)
5. Bhojpuri (1.12%)
6. Others (5.31%)

At the time of the 2011 Census of India, 68.07% of the population in the district spoke Surgujia, 20.62% Hindi, 3.14% Kurukh, 1.74% Chhattisgarhi and 1.12% Bhojpuri as their first language.

== Culture ==
Three community dances, the Karma, Saila and Suva Dance are celebrated mainly in the district during different festivals. The main festivals of India such as Diwali, Dashehra and Holi are also celebrated in Korea District. Some other festivals are also special among the Koriyan communities, such as Ganga Dashera, Charta, Nuakhai and Surhul.

== Tourist places ==
Main tourist places in the district are as follows:

- Guru Ghasidas National Park. It is worth mentioning that after being persecuted in this region, the last known Indian cheetah was sighted in Koriya District in 1951.
- Marine Fossil Park, Manendragarh
- Karamghongha, Manendragarh
- Boridand Junction railway station, located only 8 km from Manendragarh.
- Sirouli Temple, Manendragarh
- Siddh Baba Temple, Manendragarh
- Amritdhara Waterfall, Manendragarh
- Hasdeo River, Manendragarh
- Ramdaha Waterfall
- Gaurghat Waterfall, Tarra, Sonhat
- Jagnnath Mandir, West Chirimiri
- Jogi Math Kailashpur, Sonhat
- Gangi Rani Ramgarh, Sonhat
- Rock Painting Badra, Sonhat
- Korea Palace, Baikunthpur
- Jhumka Dam, Baikunthpur
- Gej Dam, Baikunthpur
- Ramdaiya Dham Mandir, Baikunthpur
- Aaruni Bandh, Sarbhoka
- Shri Karteskwar Shiv Mandir, Kathautiya, Manendragarh

== See also ==
- Surguja State
