= Surajpur district =

District In Chhattisgarh, India

- District of Chhattisgarh
- Location in Chhattisgarh
- Surajpur district
- Country: India
- State: Chhattisgarh
- Division: District
- Headquarters: Surajpur
- Tehsils: 8

Government
  - District Magistrate: S Jayavardhan (IAS)

Area
  - Total: 2,786.76 km^{2} (1,075.97 sq mi)

Population
  - Total: 789,043
  - Density: 283.140/km^{2} (733.329/sq mi)
- Time zone: UTC+05:30 (IST)
- PIN: 497xxx (Surajpur)
- Vehicle registration: CG-29
- Major highways: NH 43
- Website: surajpur.gov.in

Surajpur district is a district in the state of Chhattisgarh in central India, with its administrative headquarters at Surajpur. Surajpur is located in the northern part of the state. National Highway 43 passes through the district. Surajpur was declared a district on 15 August 2012, along with eight other newly created districts. It was the first district to receive the National Satyan Maitra Literacy Award. The district is known for its markets, which offer economical and quality products as well as for its major tourist places of Chhattisgarh with Tamor Pingla Wildlife Sanctuary.

== History ==
The district was originally known as "Daandbulla", which was then changed to "Suryapur" and then "Surajpur".

Due to its mountainous topography, the district largely escaped the turmoil of the surrounding plains. The earliest inhabitants are said to be the Kols and Gonds, but there is evidence of more widespread civilization in the region. The rulers of Surguja State were Raksel Rajputs, and were said to have originally ruled Palamu. However, in 1613 CE, while Man Singh was in Surguja to celebrate his son's wedding with the daughter of the local ruler, the Cheros, led by Bhagwant Rai, killed the then-ruler Man Singh's family and took over Palamu. Man Singh subsequently killed the chief of Surguja and took over his state. Other sources state that the Raksel dynasty gained overlordship over the various petty chieftaincies of the region and exercised hegemony over the other states including Koriya and Changbhakar.

In 1758, Surguja State was attacked by the Marathas and its raja was forced to submit to them. However the Marathas only demanded tribute and left the state largely alone. In 1792, Surguja gained the ire of the British government when it annexed a pargana of Palamu and aided a rebellion against British rule there. The British led an expedition to Surguja that ended due to a treaty between them and the Marathas in Nagpur. In 1818, after the end of the Third Anglo-Maratha War, the Marathas under Appa Sahib Bhonsle ceded the three feudatory states of Surguja, Koriya and Changbhakar to the British government. Amar Singh was declared Raja of Surguja. In 1951, the three feudatory states were dissolved and annexed to the newly formed state of Madhya Pradesh. In 2000, it was made part of the present state of Chhattisgarh. In 2012, the six western tehsils of Surguja district were split off to form Surajpur district.

== Geography ==
Surajpur district is located in northern Chhattisgarh, in the Surguja region. The district is bordered by Koriya district to the west, Singrauli district of Madhya Pradesh to the north, Balrampur district to the northeast, Surguja district to the southeast and Korba district to the south.

The district consists mainly of the Surguja plateau. In the north are a belt of forested mountains around 75 km long and 30 km wide. In these mountains is located the valley of the Rihand River which is a tributary of the Son. It flows into Surajpur district from the southeast and out through the north. In the district it is joined by smaller tributaries such as the Mahan.

== Administration ==
Tehsil is the basic unit for purposes of general administration, treasury, land revenue, land records and other items of work. It has the closest and widest contact with the rural population. The officer-in-charge of the tehsil is the tehsildar who belongs to the state civil services. He is the principal official in the district administration responsible for revenue collector. Nayab tehsildar are there to assist tehsildars. In the absence of the tehsildars, Nayab tehsildars take charge.

Surajpur district has 8 tehsils:

- Surajpur
- Ramanuj Nagar
- Prem Nagar
- Bhaiyathan
- Odagi
- Pratappur
- Bhatgaon
- Latori

== Demographics ==
According to the Census 2011, total population of 789,043, dwelling in 547 villages. The Population density of the District is noted as 283 persons/km^{2}. as per the census. The literacy rate according to the census is 60.95%, the sex ratio corresponds to 980 females per 1000 males. 71,536 (9.07%) live in urban areas. Scheduled Castes and Scheduled Tribes make up 5.43% and 45.58% of the population respectively.

Religions in Surajpur district (2011)
Religion	Percent
Hinduism	94.61%
Islam	2.81%
Other (tribal religion)	1.25%
Christianity	1.07%
Other or not stated	0.26%

Languages of Surajpur district (2011)
1. Surgujia (81.3%)
2. Hindi (6.18%)
3. 'Other' Hindi (3.21%)
4. Chhattisgarhi (2.53%)
5. Kurukh (1.88%)
6. Bengali (1.03%)
7. Bhojpuri (0.97%)
8. Others (2.94%)

According to the 2011 census, 81.26% of the population spoke Surgujia, 6.18% Hindi, 2.53% Chhattisgarhi, 1.88% Kurukh, 1.03% Bengali and 0.97% Bhojpuri as their first language. 3.21% of the population recorded their language as 'Others' under Hindi.

== Places of interest ==
There are famous temples at:

- Deogarh in the Surajpur district
- Kudargarh (Bagheshwari Devi Temple)
- Bhaiyathan (Patal Bhairav Mandir)
- Prem nagar (mahesri mandir)
- Sarasor (Shiv Temple), Surajpur
- Khatu Shyam Baba Temple, Surajpur
- Gauri Shankar mandir, Basdei, Surajpur

== See also ==
- Telgaon
- Bishrampur
- Pratappur
- Prem Nagar
