= Surajpur, Chhattisgarh =

City in Chhattisgarh, India

Surajpur
- Municipal council
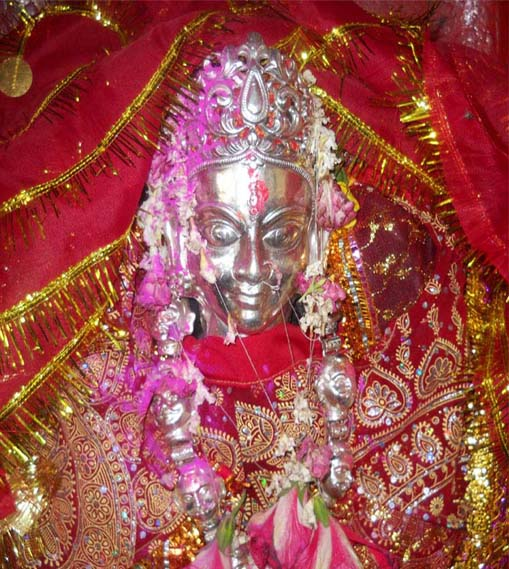
- Bageshwari Devi, Surajpur

- Location in Chhattisgarh, India Surajpur (India)
- Coordinates: 23.22°N 82.85°E
- Country: India
- State: Chhattisgarh
- District: Surajpur

Government
  - Type: Nagar Palika Parishad
  - Body: Municipal Council, Surajpur
  - Chairman: Smt. Kusumlata Rajwade (INC)
- Elevation: 528 m (1,732 ft)

Population (2011)
  - Total: 20,189

Languages
  - Official: Hindi, Chhattisgarhi
- Time zone: UTC+5:30 (IST)
- PIN: 497229
- Telephone code: 07775
- Vehicle registration: CG 29
- Website: surajpur.gov.in

Surajpur is a Nagar Palika Parishad situated in the bank of Rihand River in Surajpur district of Chhattisgarh state in Central India. It is the administrative headquarters of the Surajpur district, located 334 km away from the state's capital city, Raipur. National Highway 43 passes through city and It is well connected to Ranchi, Varanasi, and Singrauli via road. Surajpur Road railway station is connected to major cities like Delhi, Agra, Gwalior,Kkatni, Raipur, Bilaspur,and Durg-Bhilai.

== Geography ==
Surajpur is located at 23.22°N 82.85°E. It has an average elevation of 528 metres (1,732 ft).

== Demography ==
Surajpur town has a population of 20,189, of which males are 10,430 and females are 9,759 as per the census of India 2011 data. The population of children under the age of 0-6 is 2649, with 1419 males and 1230 females. The total literacy rate of Surajpur city is 79.89%, the male literacy rate is 86.74% and the female literacy rate is 72.66%. Sex: The sex ratio is 936 females per 1000 males. The child ratio is 867 per 1000 male children under the age of six. The total number of households in Surajpur is 4397.

== Education ==
Surajpur has a large scope for education and sports. The city is considered to be a base for higher education.

Schools like Shri Ram Public School and Little Wonders Play School are promoting AI, tech, discipline, civic sense, financial literacy, nutritional literacy and many more unconventional methods of teaching. SRPS uses advanced teaching methodologies, like the Socratic method and collaborative methods of learning.

=== Schools and colleges ===
The only college for graduation and postgraduate studies in the east part of Surajpur is known as Surajpur Degree College, with courses mainly in arts. Recently commerce has come into prominence for the students in the Suajpur district.

The government of Chhattisgarh is planning to open a school to provide English-medium education for the regional students. Apart from this, Surajpur has a very good education background. A number of Hindi and English-medium schools have come into existence after the formation of Chhattisgarh State

1. Kindergarten Play School surajpur (Private)
2. Shri Ram Public School (Private)
3. Little Wonders Play School (Private)
4. Sadhu Ram Vidya Mandir (Private)
5. RHS DIGITAL SCHOOL (PRIVATE)
6. Navodaya Vidyalaya (Central Government School)
7. Municipal School (Government)
8. Boys Higher Secondary School (Government)
9. Girls Higher Secondary School (Government)
10. Saraswati Shishu Mandir Hr. Secondary School (Private)
11. Global Public School (Private)
12. Aadarsh High School (Private)
13. Pt.Viswanath Memorial School (Private)
14. Govind Saraswati Shishu Mandir Hr. Secondary School (Private)
15. Surya Kant Tripathi Nirala School (Private)
16. Holy Temple Hr. Sec School (Private)
17. East & West Mission High School (Private)
18. D.A.V Public School (Private)

== Transport ==
=== Road ===
Surajpur is linked with both roads and Railways. National Highway 43 crosses to link Katni towards the north and Gumla & Ranchi towards the east. Surajpur is directly linked to Varanasi Via Bhaiyathan → Pratappur → Renukoot → Robertsganj and is also well-connected to Bilaspur, Chhattisgarh → Raipur → Bhilai → Nagpur.

=== Air ===
Swami Vivekananda Airport, Raipur is the nearest airport to Surajpur (363.5 km). Surajpur is well connected with the Raipur airport. Trams/buses are available from To Surajpur. Thn Nearest airport near Surajpur is Raipur (capital of Chhattisgarh). One can take flights from Delhi to Raipur and use the connecting bus or train service directly from Raipur (the Durg-Ambikapur Express is the best train to reach Surajpur). Almost all major cities of the country are connected through Raipur Airport. Indian Airlines, Jet Airways and Air India are providing their daily services to all the major airports of the country.

=== Rail ===
Surajpur Railway station is 6 km (3.7 mi) from the City Center. The station provides connection with Bhopal, the state capital of Madhya Pradesh, Raipur, the state capital of Chhattisgarh, New Delhi, the national capital. Bilaspur is the headquarters of Southeast Central Railways and is well connected with mail and super-fast trains from Bhopal, Indore, Mumbai, New Delhi, Gwalior, Ahmedabad, Kolkata, Ranchi, Jamshedpur, Patna, Lucknow, Chennai, Bangalore, Nagpur, Katni, Kota, Jaipur, Jammu & Hyderabad. Some of the important train connecting Surajpur Road are :

- 22407/22408 Hazrat Nizamuddin - Ambikapur SF Express
- 11265/11266 Jabalpur - Ambikapur Express
- 18241/18242 Durg - Ambikapur Express
- 18755/18756 Ambikapur - Shahdol Express
- 18233/18234 Narmada Express between Indore Junction BG (Indore) to Bilaspur at Anuppur Railway Station is 127 km (79 mi) away from Surajpur station
- 12853/12854 Amarkantak Express between Bhopal and Durg at Anuppur Railway station 127 km (79 mi) away from Surajpur station

Besides this it halts for a few seconds at Anuppur station for trains like Garib rath, Utkal Express, Hirakud Express, New Delhi Sampark Kranti, Bilaspur - Rewa Etc.

SURAJPUR ROAD STATION also serves as an Junction for Single Electric Railway line uptoAdani Group operated Parsa kete coal mines of Hasdeo coalfield Region. In future, it'll expand to matin, which is connected to Pendra road- Gevra road Rail line. Through this project, Surajpur Railway Station will be directly connected to Korba and Mumbai-Howrah main line.

== Places of interest ==
=== Durga Mandir ===
Durga Mandir is situated at Tilsiva, 1 km from Cthe centreof Surajpur.

This temple is also known as the Mahamaya Temple.

=== Gaytri Mandir ===
Gaytri Mandir is one of the famous and oldest temples, situated on the bank of river Rihand at Gayatri Nagar west in Surajpur. It is a temple of Goddess Sarda. Surajpur wakes up with the prayer "Gayatri Mantra", which can be heard at 5:00AM throughout Surajpur. The temple is surrounded by a nursery and parks.

=== Shiv Park ===
Shiv Park is developed by the local authority after the formation of Chhattisgarh. It is a popular place to hang out. Shiv Park is situated on Gayatri Mandir Road at Gayatri Nagar (West). but nowadays it has become a forest. No one takes care of this park.

=== Mahamaya Mandir ===
Mahamaya Mandir is situated at Devipur, 4 km away from Surajpur. Mahamaya Temple is one of the most famous and Oldest temples. People from different Places visit Mahamaya Mandir toworship and now it has become a major Tourist Attraction Place in Chhattisgarh. The people of Surajpur District has a great faith on Mahamaya devi and during Navratri this place becomes a major attraction and navratri mela is being organized by the people. The daily free bus service is being provided by the Bhakt mandaly of Surajpur for the pilgrimage and devotees to reach Devipur from Surajpur. A Huge arrangement is being made by the Local People and public Authorities as well.

=== Shyam Baba Temple ===
It is again a famous temple situated at Surajpur. A large Mela and Nagar Bhraman is being organised by the local people. Many people around Surajpur and other surrounding districts gather on the eve to celebrate Lord Shyama's Bibthday. F

=== Kumeli Waterfalls ===
It is a waterfall situated about 15 km from the district headquarters of Surajpur. This waterfall is created by various water sources from the deep green forests of the Ketka range.

=== Rakasganda Waterfalls ===
It is a waterfall on the Rihand River. it is 104 km from Surajpur city. It is almost at the Uttar Pradesh and Madhya Pradesh border. It attracts tourists from all three states.

== See also ==
- Surajpur District
