= Khongapani =

- Town
- Location in Chhattisgarh, India Khongapani (India)
- Coordinates: 23.19859°N 82.2412°E
- Country: India
- State: Chhattisgarh
- District: Manendragarh-Chirmiri-Bharatpur

Population (2001)
  - Total: 17,865

Languages
  - Official: Hindi; Chhattisgarhi
- Time zone: UTC+5:30 (IST)
- PIN: 497447
- Vehicle registration: CG-32

Khongapani is a census town in manendragarh-Chirmiri-Bharatpur district in the Indian state of Chhattisgarh.

== Demographics ==
As of 2001 India census, Khongapani had a population of 17,865. Males constitute 53% of the population and females 47%. Khongapani has an average literacy rate of 60%, higher than the national average of 59.5%: male literacy is 69%, and female literacy is 50%. In Khongapani, 14% of the population is under 6 years of age.

Khongapani has three banks one is SBI and other is Central Bank & Gramin Bank. People there are mostly dependent on the South Eastern Coal Mines. The nearest river is Hasdeo river, it is a major tributary of the Mahanadi, due to the name of this river this area is known as the Hasdeo area.

Nearby places are ManendraGarh, Bijuri, Rajnagar, Ramnagar, and Ledri.

== Economy ==
Khongapani is basically a coal industrial hub, where majorities are working in South Eastern Coal Mines. Collectively it has four coal mines: 1. West Jhagrakhand Colliery (A.Seam) 2. B.Seam 3. Palkimara Region 4. Haldibari

== Education ==
"Shri Yamuna Prasad Shastri H/S School" is one of the oldest schools. It was opened in 1951 there at Khongapni. And State Government Primary and Higher Secondary School is there.

Apart from this, most of the students go to nearby Kendriya School jkd, Ramakrishna School, D.A.V. school, Adarsh Vidya Mandir, S Prabha Memorial Convent School, St. Joseph's Mission School, Bachpan School, St. Joseph's Convent School, Takshilla School.
