= Bastar Dussehra =

Dussehra festival in Chhattisgarh

Bastar Dussehra is a festival in Chhattisgarh, India. It celebrates the goddess Danteswari. During Dussehra, Bastar inhabitants organize worship ceremonies at the Danteswari temple in Jagadalpur. On this occasion, a rath is made in which goddess sits.

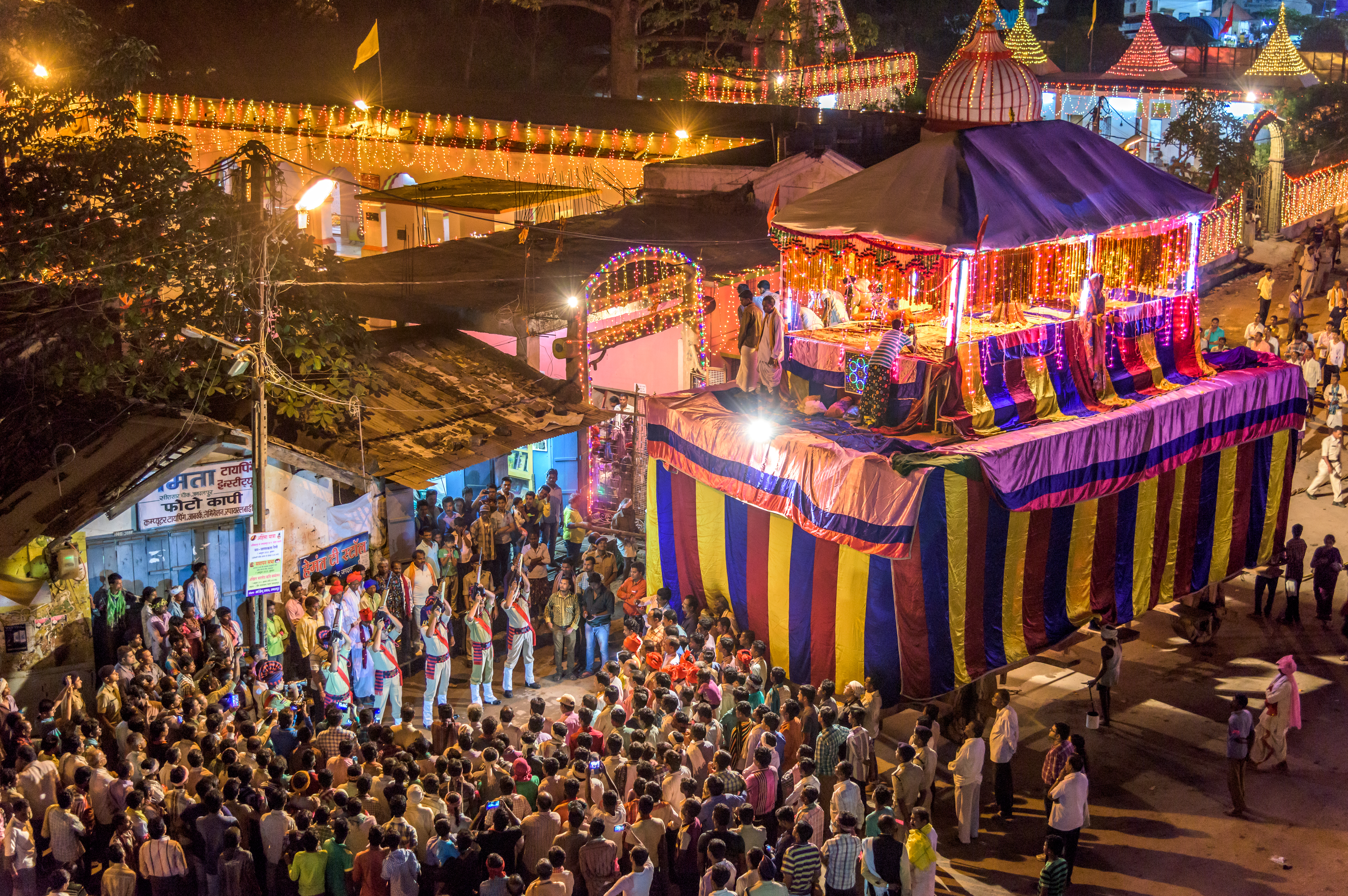
Bastar Dusshera festival celebration in Jagdalpur

== History ==
Maharaja Purushaottam Deo initiated the festival of Dussehra in the early 15th century.

== Festivities ==
During the ten day festival, the Raj family arranges worship sessions in which the arms of the goddess Danteswari are treated as divine elements. Control of Bastar Dussehra is formally transferred to the Diwan, with the Zamindar and similar important personalities as witnesses.

Kunwar Amavasya is the first day of Dussehra. On the night of the first day, the transfer of control takes place. Before handing over power to the Diwan, a girl who is believed to possess spiritual powers is asked for permission. This girl holds a wooden sword and stands in a war-like posture.

The second day is Pratipada, which is followed by arti and salami.

On the ninth day, the Raja of Bastar welcomes the goddess Danteswari, who comes to the entrance of the city in a doli, a type of palanquin.

The tenth day is Dussehra, when the Raja organises a durbar at which people present their requests. An aarti ceremony is held. The Dussehra of Bastar is distinct from Dussehra festivals elsewhere in India.
