= Bastar Lokotsav =

Bastar Lokotsav is a festival of Chhattisgarh that involves the representation of the folk culture of the state of Chhattisgarh. The lokotsav, which occurs after the end of rainy season, attracts large number of tribal groups who come to participate in this festival from remote villages of Chhattisgarh. Handicraft items are exhibited in the Bastar Lokotsav. Connoting the festival of the folk people of Chhattisgarh, lokotsav of Bastar starts with an array of cultural events. The Jagadalpur area of Chhattisgarh organizes a special program called BastaParab in which dance and song variations of the tribal communities can be seen.

The Bastar Lokotsav is a kind of platform on which the tribal traditions and culture get a recognition. During the loktsav, people from all other adjoining districts of the state come to enjoy the charismatic charm of the occasion. Also, tribes of other states of India are found participating enthusiastically in the Bastar Lokotsav. The exquisite handicrafts which are rare are also sold by the tribal groups of Bastar during the festival. Sometimes, tourists from other countries are also found in the Bastar Lokotsav. This indicates the immense popularity of the lokotsav that has crossed the regional boundaries. As a colorful and historical cultural identity, Bastar Lokotsav also enhances the tourism prospects of Chhattisgarh. In the promotional campaigns and in the sightseeing portals of the state, mention of Bastar Lokotsav is found more often than not. The government of Chhattisgarh always encourages such tribal festivals in the state. Bastar Lokotsav adds a vibrant dimension to the festivals of the state.
