= Economy of Chattisgarh =

Economy of a state in India

Economy of Chhattisgarh
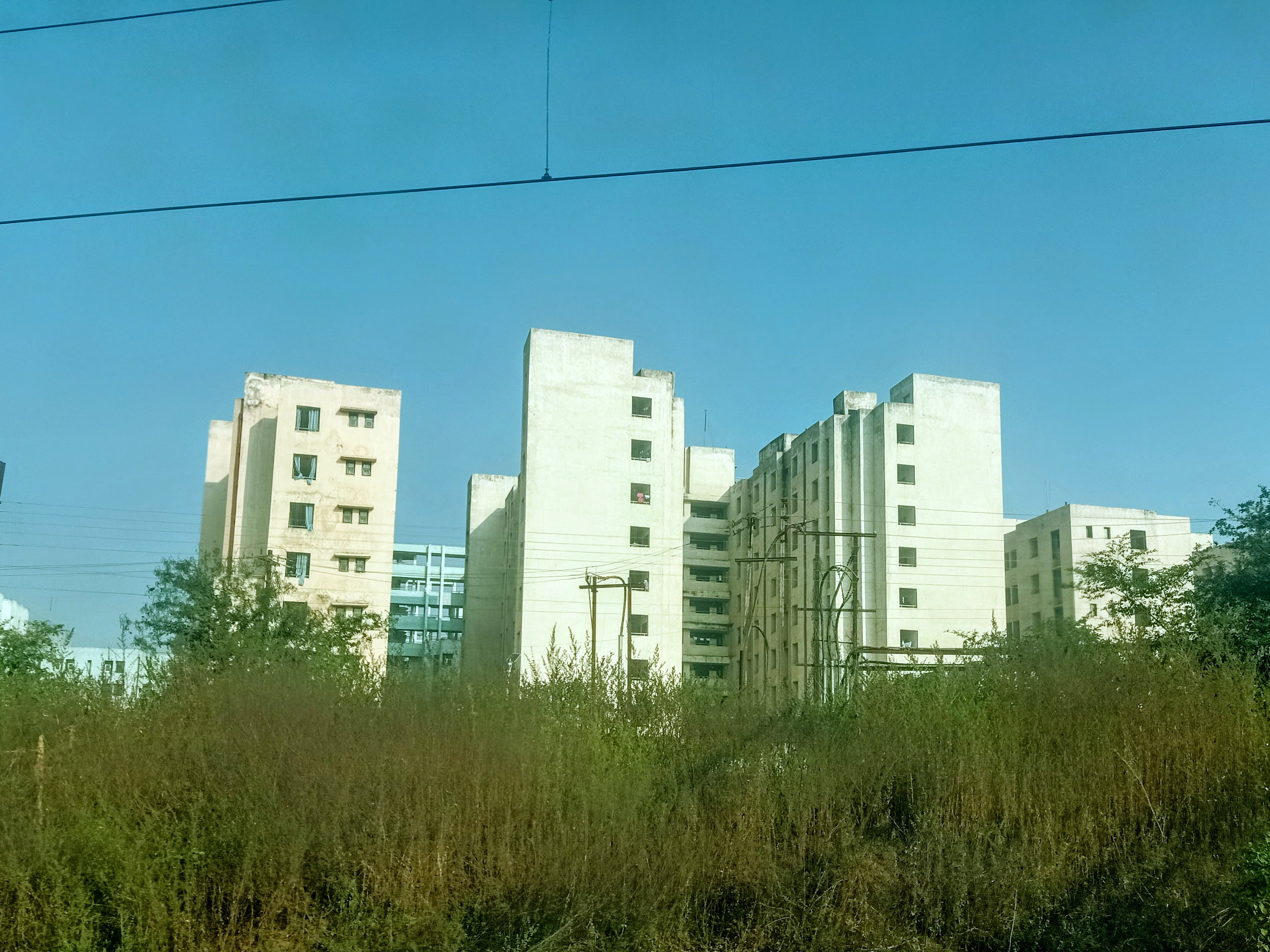
- AIIMS Raipur Residencial area
- Currency: Indian Rupee (INR, ₹)

Statistics
- Population: ▲30.982 Million (2025)
- GDP: ▲₹7.095 lakh crore (US$74 billion) (2026–27 est.)
- GDP rank: 17th
- GDP growth: ▲12% (2026–27)
- GDP per capita: ▲₹245,244 (US$2,500) (2026–27)
- GDP by sector: Agriculture 32% Industry 32% Services 36% (2023–24)
- Population below national poverty line: ▼11.71% in poverty (2022-23)
- Human Development Index: ▲0.670 (2023) medium 31th

Public finance
- Government debt: 23.8% of GSDP (2023–24 est.)
- Budget balance: ₹−23,900 crore (US$−2.5 billion) (3.8% of GSDP) (2025–26 est.)
- Revenue: ₹141,000 crore (US$15 billion) (2025–26 est.)
- Spending: ₹165,000 crore (US$17 billion) (2025–26 est.)
- All values, unless otherwise stated, are in US dollars.

Chhattisgarh's nominal gross state domestic product (GSDP) is estimated at ₹6.359 lakh crore (US$66 billion) in 2025–26, making it the 17th-largest state economy in India. The economy of Chhattisgarh recorded a growth rate of 11.2% in 2023–24.
