= Panduvamshis of Dakshina Kosala =

7th–8th century Indian dynasty

- c. 7th century CE–c. 8th century CE
- Location of the Panduvamshis of Dakshina Kosala and neighbouring South Asian polities circa 600 CE.
- Capital: Sirpur, Mahasamund
- Religion: Hinduism; Buddhism
- Government: Monarchy
- Historical era: Early medieval period
  - Established: c. 7th century CE
  - Disestablished: c. 8th century CE
Preceded by	Succeeded by
Sharabhapuriya dynasty	Somavamshi dynasty

The Panduvamshis (IAST: Pāṇḍuvaṁśī) or Pandavas (IAST: Pāṇḍava) were an Indian dynasty that ruled the historical Dakshina Kosala region in present-day Chhattisgarh state of India, during the 7th and the 8th centuries. They may have been related to the earlier Panduvamshis of Mekala: both dynasties claimed lunar lineage and descent from the legendary Pandavas.

After the fall of the Sharabhapuriyas in the late 6th century, Dakshina Kosala appears to have been controlled by petty chiefs until the Panduvamshis gained control of the region. The Panduvamshis may have captured a part of the neighbouring Utkala and Vidarbha regions at different times, but their control of these regions did not last long.

Their capital was probably located at Shripura (modern Sirpur). The later Somavamshi dynasty, which claimed lunar lineage, appears to have been related to them, but this cannot be said with certainty.

== Origin ==
=== Legendary descent claims ===
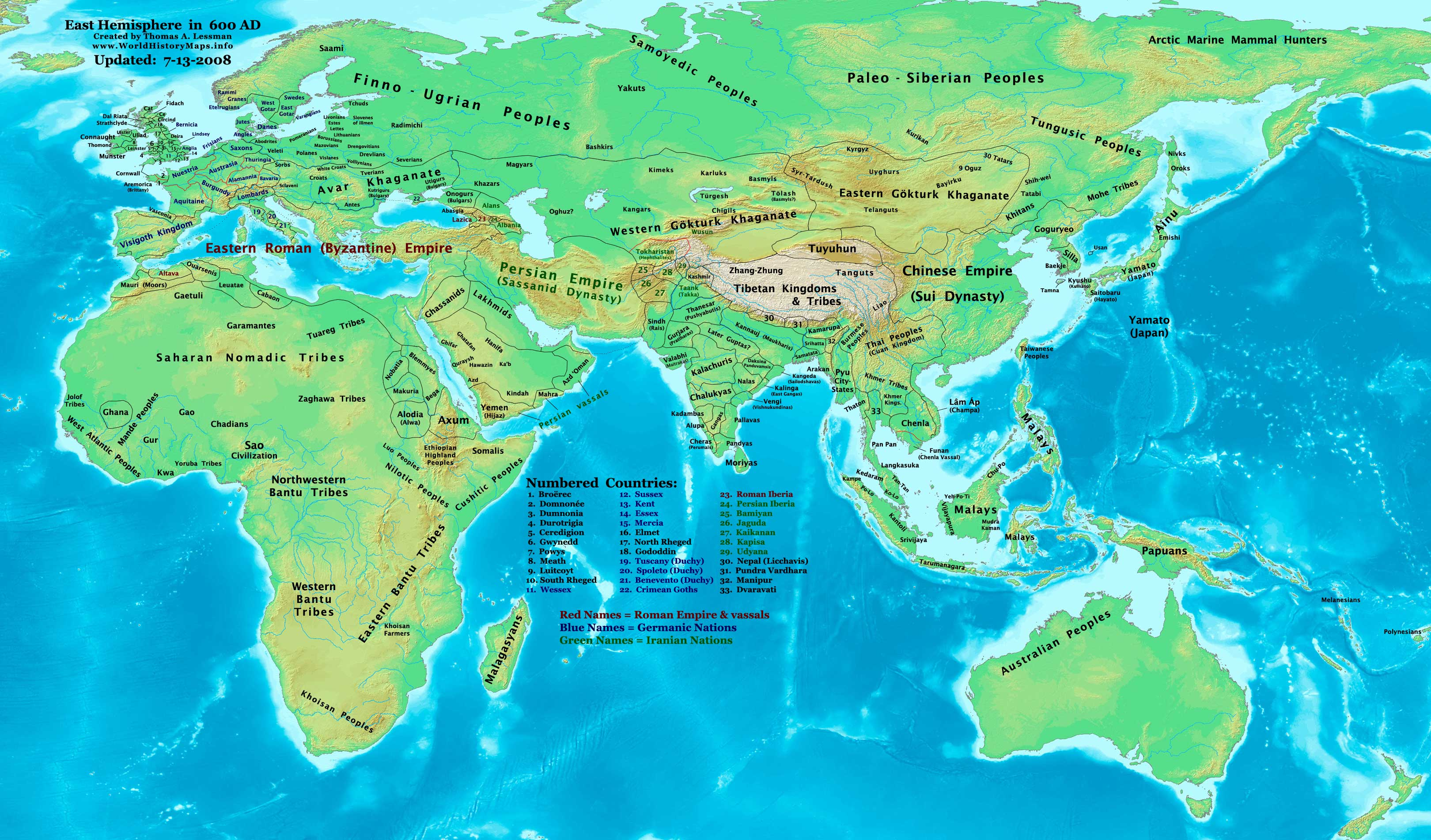
Territory of the Panduvamshis in 600 AD

Several records of the family claim a lunar lineage for it:

- An inscription of the second Panduvamshi king Indrabala, discovered at the Lakshmaneshvara Temple at Kharod, describes him as "the very full moon in the sky that is the shashi-kula (lunar family)"
- The Adbhar (Adhabhara) inscription of Nannaraja II states that his ancestor Tivaradeva was born in the shashi-vamsha ("moon lineage")
- The inscriptions of Balarjuna state that he was born in the soma-vamsha or shitamshu-vamsha (both meaning "moon lineage")
- The Sirpur Lakshmana temple inscription of Balarjuna states that his grandfather Chandragupta was born in the chandranvaya ("family of the moon")
- Another inscription of Balarjuna states that the dynasty's founder Udayana belonged to the shashadharaanvaya ("family of the moon")

Within the lunar lineage, the dynasty traced its descent to the legendary Pandavas. For example:

- The Arang stone inscription from the reign of Nannaraja I states that his ancestor Udayana was born in the Pandava-vamsha ("Pandava lineage")
- Three copper-plate inscriptions of Tivaradeva state that his father Nannaraja I adorned the Pandu-vamsha ("Lineage of Pandu")

The claim of belonging to the lunar lineage ("Somavamshi") occurs in this dynasty's inscriptions throughout its lifetime. However, the claim of belonging to the Pandava lineage ("Panduvamshi") does not occur in the inscriptions issued after the reign of Tivaradeva. Despite this, modern scholars describe the dynasty as "Panduvamshi" so as to distinguish them from the later Somavamshi dynasty.

=== Relationship to the Panduvamshis of Mekala ===
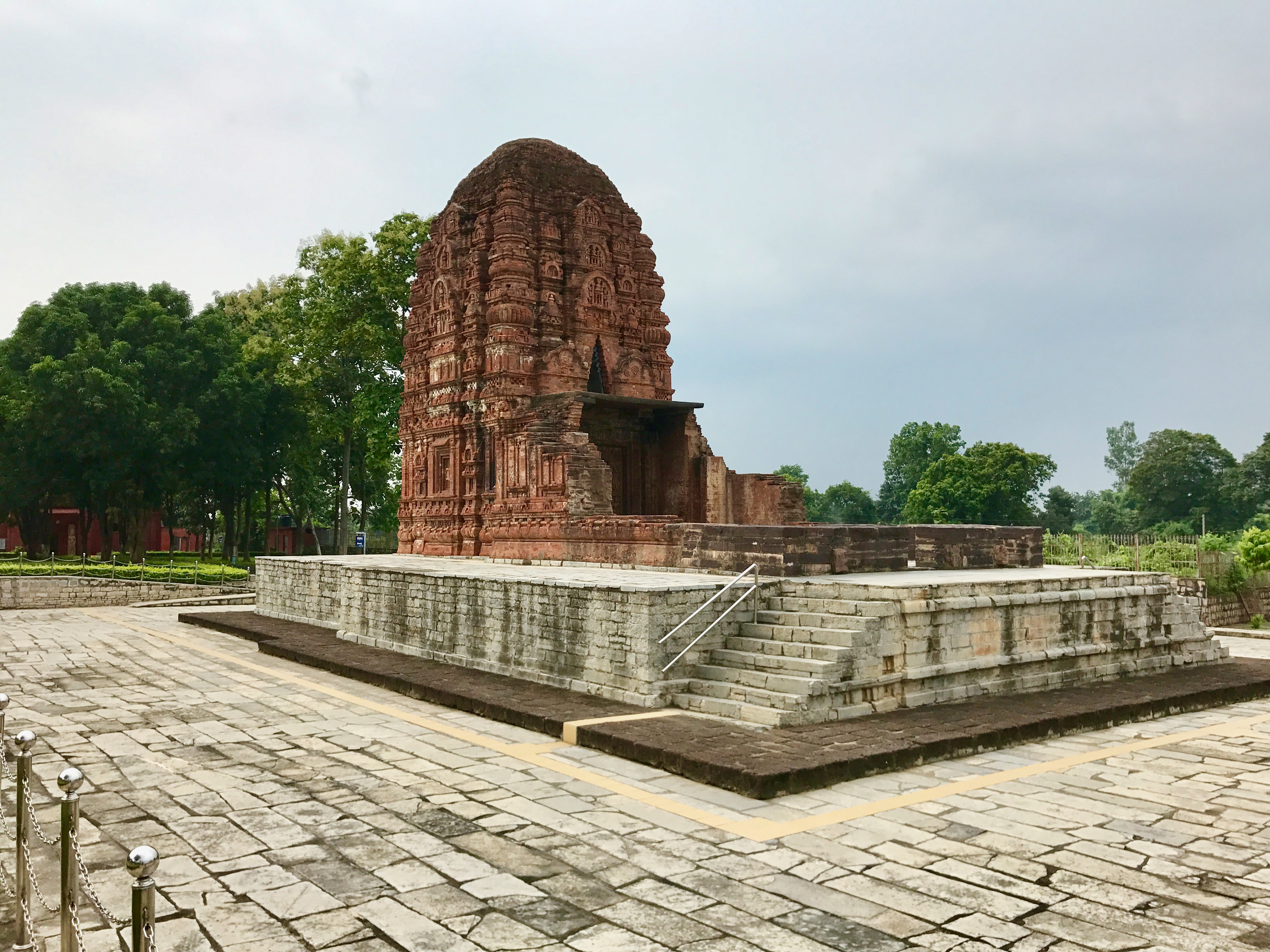
Laxman temple at Sirpur, 7th century CE.

Th Panduvamshis of Dakshina Kosala may have been related to the Panduvamshis of Mekala, an earlier dynasty that ruled an adjacent area. Both dynasties claimed descent from the legendary Pandavas, and also claimed the lunar lineage. However, based on the available evidence, the relationship between the two dynasties, if any, cannot be determined with certainty.

Several arguments can be made in favour of the theory that the Panduvamshis of Dakshina Kosala were not descendants of the Panduvamshis of Mekala. For example:

- The inscriptions of the Dakshina Kosala kings do not mention the Mekala rulers, although they contain a detailed description of their dynasty.
- Only one king of the Dakshina Kosala dynasty is known to have a name ending in "-bala", while all but one kings of the Mekala dynasty had names ending in -"bala".
- The copper-plate inscriptions of the Dakshina Kosala dynasty are composed in prose, and are inscribed in "box-headed" characters (although some private stone inscriptions from their reign are inscribed in "nail-headed" characters). On the other hand, the inscriptions of the Mekala dynasty are composed in a mixture of prose and verse, and are inscribed in "nail-headed" characters.
- The Dakshina Kosala rulers were Vaishnavites, unlike the Mekala rulers, who were Shaivites.

Some of these differences are explainable. For example, the Panduvamshis' use of the "box-headed" characters can be attributed to the influence of the Sharabhapuriyas, who preceded them in the Dakshina Kosala region. It can be argued that the later Panduvamshis adopted Vaishnavism. The Dakshina Kosala family may have been a collateral branch of the Mekala family, but this cannot be said with certainty in absence of concrete historical evidence.

== Period ==
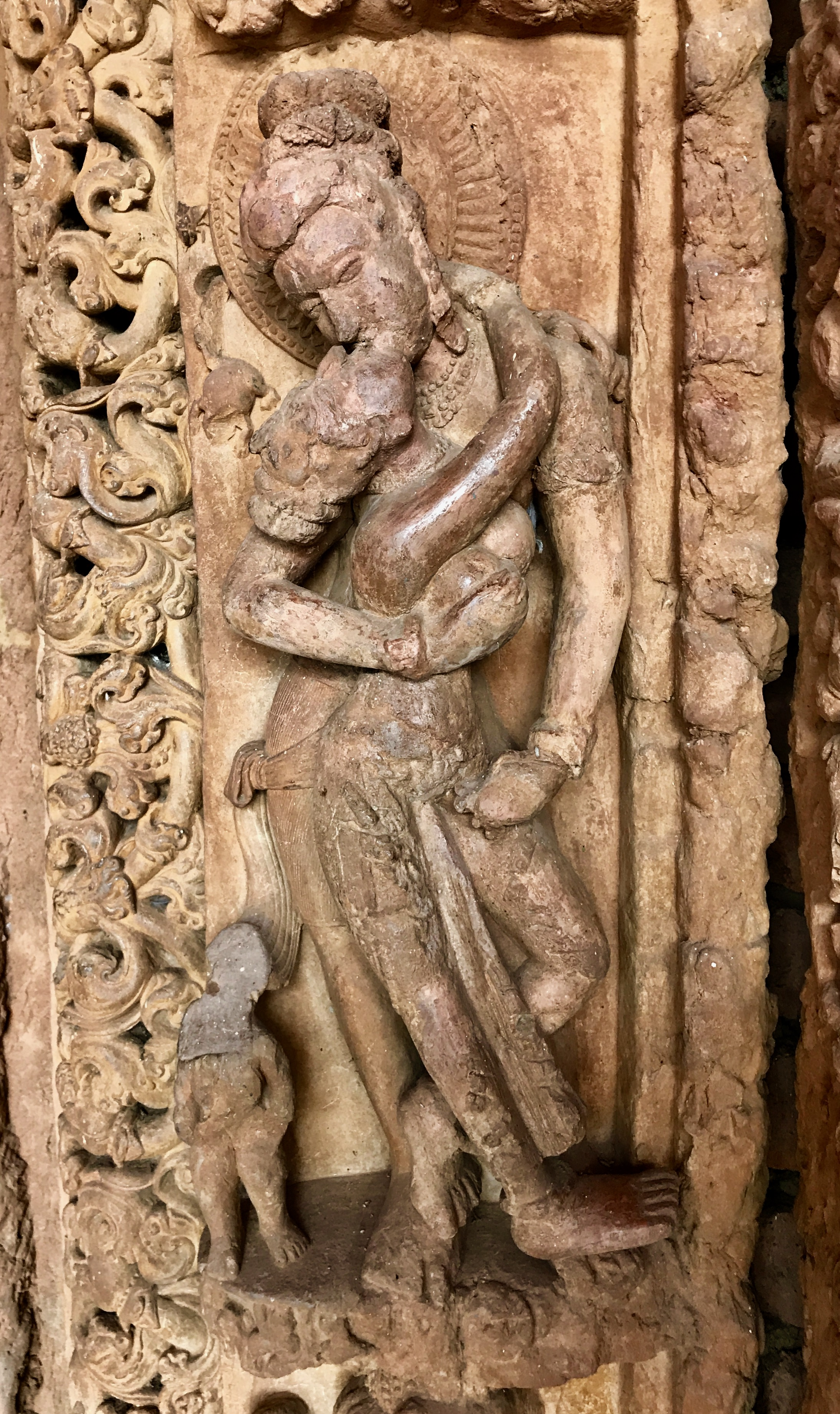
An 8th-century kissing couple artwork in the Sirpur Group of Monuments.

The inscriptions of the Panduvamshi kings are dated in their regnal years instead of a calendar era. Therefore, historians have tried to determine the period of their rule using various other methods. V. V. Mirashi and D. C. Sircar dated the Panduvamshi ruler Tivaradeva to the 6th century, but A. M. Shastri later disputed their methodology, and theorized that Tivaradeva ascended the throne around 660 CE. According to Shastri's theory, the Panduvamshi rule in Dakshina Kosala started in the early 7th century, and ended in the 8th century.

=== Methodology ===
Identification of the Shailodbhava rival Trivara
Shastri identifies Tivaradeva with the king Trivara mentioned in the inscriptions of the Shailodbhava chief Dharmaraja II alias Manabhita, who ruled in present-day Odisha. According to these inscriptions, Dharmaraja's younger brother Madhava allied with king Trivara in an attempt to dethrone him, but he defeated them at the foot of the Vindhyas. Shastri notes that the Adbhar inscription of Tivaradeva's son Nannaraja II mentions Tivaradeva as the lord of Utkala region in present-day Odisha. This corroborates the theory that Tivaradeva is same as Trivara, who must have invaded the Shailodbhava territory. Dharmaraja's grandfather Madhavaraja II alias Sainyabhita is attested by an inscription dated to 620-621 CE (Gupta era 300). This suggests that Dharmaraja and his contemporary Tivaradeva must have ruled around the mid-7th century.

Date of the preceding rulers
The Panduvamshis ruled Dakshina Kosala after the Sharabhapuriya dynasty, but they did not immediately succeed the Sharabhapuriyas. The Sharabhapuriya rule ended sometime around 590 CE. The Malhar inscription of Vyaghraraja suggests that his dynasty, known as the Amaraya-kula, ruled Dakshina Kosala after the Sharabhapuriyas. Similarly, the Arang inscription of Bhimasena II suggests that his dynasty, known as the Rajarshi-tulya-kula, ruled the region for sometime. In addition, Shastri theorizes that the last of the Mekala Panduvamshis also ruled Dakshina Kosala for a brief time.
Shastri dates the Arang inscription of Bhimasena II to 601 CE (Gupta era 282). Vasudev Vishnu Mirashi read the inscription's date as Gupta era 182, but Shastri dismisses this reading as inaccurate, pointing out that the earlier scholars such as Hira Lal also deciphered the first figure of the date as "2", not "1". Based on paleographic evidence, the Arang stone inscription from the reign of the Panduvamshi king Nannaraja I can be dated to half-a-century later than Bhimasena's inscription. This further corroborates the theory that Nannaraja I and his son Tivaradeva ruled around the mid-7th century.
Shastri dates the beginning of the Panduvamshi rule in Dakshina Kosala to c. 620 CE, allowing three decades for the rule of the Amaraya-kula chiefs, the Rajarshi-tulya-kula chiefs, and the Mekala Panduvamshi king Udirnavaira. According to him, the first Panduvamshi king Udayana probably did not rule Dakshina Kosala, and his son Indrabala ruled during c. 620-640, which fits well with the theory dating Tivaradeva's ascension to the mid-7th century.

Date of the Somavamshis
Alexander Cunningham dated Tivaradeva's reign to 425-450 CE, based on the Madala Panji palm-leaf manuscripts, which provide dates for the Somavamshi rulers, whom Cunningham theorized to be the descendants of the Panduvamshis. However, Madala Panji is no longer considered reliable by modern historians for determining the dates of the early Somavamshi rulers. John Faithfull Fleet dated Tivaradeva's reign to post-800 CE, but the later epigraphic discoveries proved his theory wrong.

Identification of Suryavarman
According to the Sirpur Lakshmana temple inscription of the Panduvamshi king Shivagupta Balarjuna, his mother Vasata was the daughter of king Suryavarman. Mirashi identified Suryavarman with the Maukhari prince Suryavarman, who is mentioned in the 554 CE Haraha inscription issued during the reign of the Maukhari king Ishanavarman. Based on this identification, Mirashi dated the beginning of the Panduvamshi rule to the 6th century.
Shastri disagrees with this identification, pointing out that according to the Sirpur Lakshmana Temple inscription, Suryavarman was a king (nṛpa) born in the family of Varmans, who were considered great for being the overlords of Magadha. However, there is no evidence that the Maukhari prince Suryavarman ever became a king: his Haraha inscription does not describe him as a crown prince, and the dynasty's records and other literary sources do not mention him in the genealogy of the Maukhari kings. Moreover, Ishanavarman's family mainly ruled parts of the present-day Uttar Pradesh. He did not rule the Magadha region, although he may have passed through Magadha to fight battles in the Gauda and Odisha regions, as claimed in his inscriptions. A feudatory Maukhari family is known to have ruled a small principality in the present-day Gaya district of the historical Magadha region, but it was distinct from Ishanavarman's family. Lastly, although the names of the Maukhari kings ended in "-varman", the family itself was not known by that suffix. Shastri argues that if Suryavarman actually belonged to the Maukhari dynasty, the author of the inscription would not have failed to glorify his patron by explicitly mentioning Vasata's Maukhari lineage.

Identification of Tivaranagara
The Ipur inscription of the Vishnukundin ruler Madhavavarman II Janashraya describes him as "the delighter of the hearts of the young ladies in the palace(s) of Trivara-nagara". His Polamuru inscription similarly states that he was "fond of sporting with the excellent young women in the palaces of Trivara-nagara". According to historians V. V. Mirashi and D. C. Sircar, the term "Trivara-nagara" can be interpreted as "the city of Trivara", and these expressions suggest that Madhavavarman defeated Trivara. Both scholars dated Madhavavarman to the 6th century, and identified his rival Trivara with Tivaradeva.
Shastri disagrees with this identification, pointing out that no records of the Panduvamshi dynasty refer to its capital Shripura as "Trivara-nagara", and there are no known instances of any capital town being referred to by its king's name in the regional records. Moreover, other scholars have interpreted the term "Trivara-nagara" differently, theorizing that it was the name of the city where Madhavavarman resided (possibly modern Tiruvuru), or that it refers to his conquest of "three excellent cities" (tri-vara-nagara).

Xuanzang's description
The 7th century Chinese Buddhist traveler Xuanzang describes the contemporary king of Kosala as a Kshatriya Buddhist, and states that the kingdom had over 100 Buddhist monasteries with 10,000 Mahayanists. One theory identifies this king with Shivagupta Balarjuna, as some inscriptions from his reign (including one of his own inscriptions) record grants made to Buddhists.
However, Shivagupta Balarjuna was a Shaivite, as attested by his own inscriptions. Historian A. M. Shastri theorizes that Xuanzang mistook a tolerant attitude towards Buddhism as formal affiliation to Buddhism, and his generic description cannot be used to precisely identify and date the contemporary ruler of Kosala.

=== Chronology of rulers ===
The following is a chronology of the dynasty's rulers, according to A. M. Shastri's methodology (the rulers are sons of their predecessors, unless specified otherwise):

- Udayana, r. c. 600-620 CE, probably did not rule Dakshina Kosala
- Indrabala, r. c. 620-640 CE
  - Indrabala's brother, whose name is lost in the damaged part of the Arang stone inscription, probably ruled simultaneously
- Nannaraja I, c. 640-660 CE
  - Ishanadeva (a brother of Nannaraja I) and Bhavadeva (a son of Indrabala's brother) may have ruled independently, or as vassals of Nannaraja I
- Mahashiva Tivara alias Tivara-deva, r. c. 660-680 CE
- Nannaraja II alias Nanna II, r. c. 680-700 CE
- Chandragupta, r. c. 700-710 CE
- Harshagupta alias Harsha-deva, r. c. 710-730 CE
- Maha-Shivagupta alias Shivagupta alias Balarjuna, r. c. 730-790 CE

== Territory ==
Find spots of the inscriptions of the Pāṇḍuvaṁśins of Dakshina Kosala

The Panduvamhis ruled the historical Dakshina Kosala region in the present-day Chhattisgarh. Except the Kalinjar inscription of Udayana, all of the dynasty's inscriptions have been discovered in Chhattisgarh, which suggests that their core territory was limited to Chhattisgarh.

The inscriptions of Tivaradeva describe him as Kosaladhipati ("Lord of Kosala"). The Adbhar inscription of his son Nannaraja II states that he became lord of all Kosala, Utkala and other mandalas (provinces) "by the valour of his own arms". However, Nannaraja II himself is mentioned only as the lord of Kosala. This suggests that Tivaradeva's control of other regions such as Utkala did not last long. The Sonakpaat (or Senkapat) inscription from Shivagupta suggests that the Panduvamshi kingdom included a part of the Vidarbha region in present-day Maharashtra, but this too, was temporary.

Some earlier scholars believed that the dynasty originated from Vidarbha, based on an inscription from the reign of Nannaraja I, which records the construction of a Buddhist temple by his relative Bhavadeva. Rev. Dr. Stevenson, who first published this inscription, gave the find spot of this inscription as Bhadravati (Bhandak) in the Vidarbha region. However, Indologist Lorenz Franz Kielhorn stated that this inscription was found at Ratanpur in Chhattisgarh, from which it was moved to the Nagpur Central Museum in Vidarbha. Historian V. V. Mirashi, who once traced the dynasty's origin to Vidarbha based on this inscription, later changed his view, and agreed that the inscription was originally found in Chhattisgarh. Mirashi and Y. K. Deshpande later determined that the inscription was originally found at a temple in Arang in Chhattisgarh, based on the testimony of Vinayakrao Aurangabadkar, who was the first person to transcribe it. Hira Lal, in Inscriptions In the Central Provinces And Berar, earlier described a fragmentary inscription that mentions Ranakesarin. Based on this, historian D. C. Sircar speculated that there were two different inscriptions with similar content: one found at Arang (mentioned by Hira Lal and Aurangabadkar), and the other at Bhadravati (mentioned by Rev. Dr. Stevenson). However, historian A. M. Shastri pointed out that the inscriptions mentioned by Hira Lal and Aurangabadkar cannot be same: Hira Lal's inscription is a Vaishnavite record found at the Mahamayi temple in Arang, and begins with an invocation to Vishnu. Aurangabadkar's inscription, on the other hand, is a Buddhist record (although Aurangabadkar wrongly mentioned the temple commissioned by Ranakesarin as a Jain shrine, confused by the use of the term jina). Therefore, there is no evidence to suggest that the Panduvamshis originated from Vidarbha.

=== Capital ===
The capital of the dynasty was most probably located at Shripura (IAST: Śrīpura; modern Sirpur), which had also served as the capital of the preceding Sharabhapuriya kings. The copper-plate charters of Tivaradeva and his son Nannaraja II state that they were issued from Shripura. The subsequent inscriptions of the dynasty do not mention their place of issue, but many of them, issued during the reign of Balarjuna, have been discovered at Sirpur. This suggests that Shripura continued to serve as the dynasty's capital in the later times.

== Political history ==
=== Udayana ===
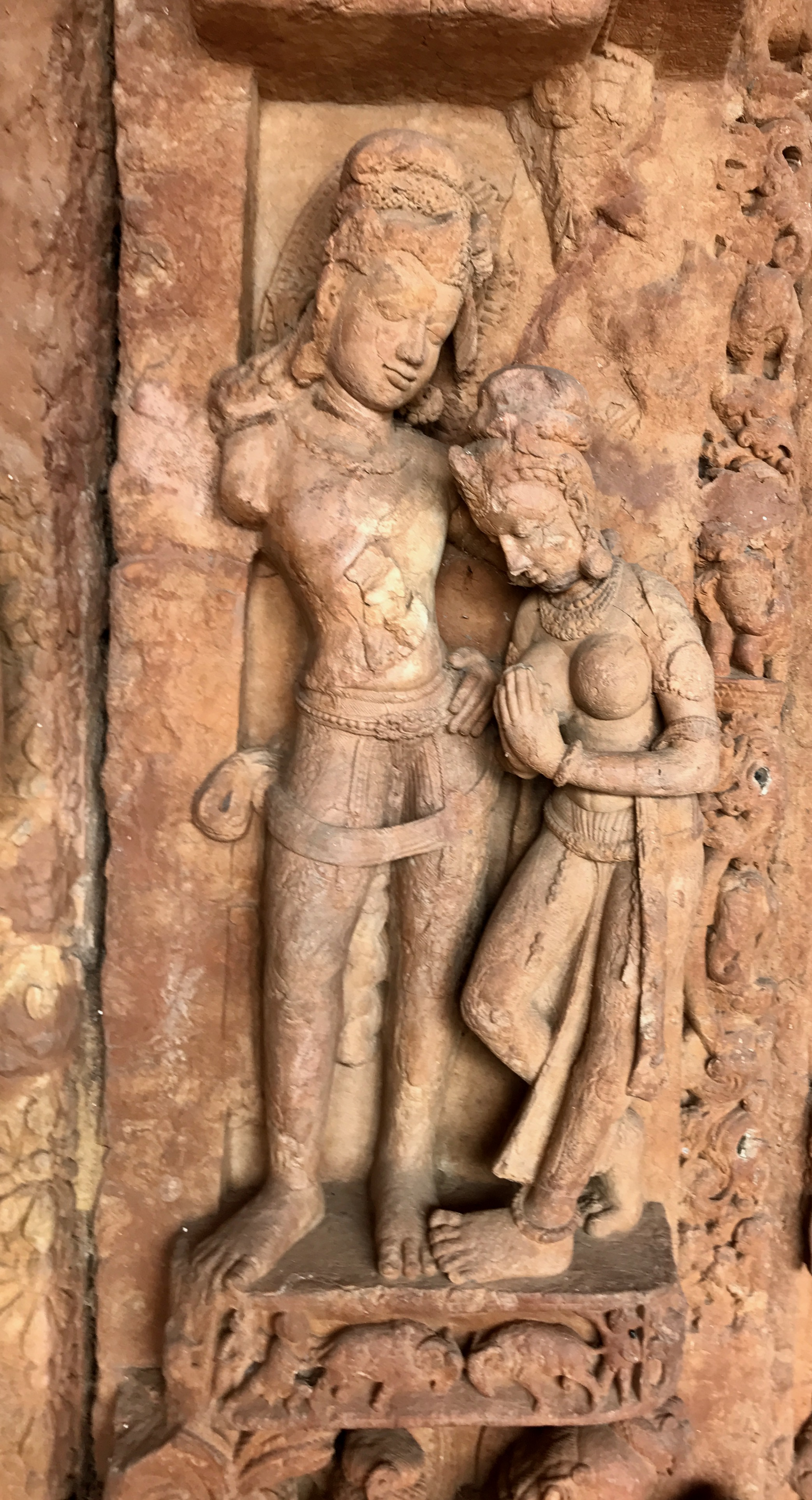
Sirpur relief excavated: she steps on his feet, seeks forgiveness with a namaste gesture. Sirpur Group of Monuments, 8th century CE.

Udayana is the earliest king mentioned in the dynasty's inscriptions, including the Arang stone inscription of Nannaraja I and a Sirpur stone inscription of Balarjuna, although no inscription from his own reign is available. A 9th century Kalinjar stone inscription states that the Pandava king Udayana built a Bhadreshvara (Shiva) temple at Kalinjar. Assuming this refers to the Panduvamshi king Udayana, it appears that Udayana was the ruler of a principality centered around Kalinjar. He may have conquered Dakshina Kosala, but this cannot be said with certainty. Most probably, he did not rule Dakshina Kosala, and the region was conquered by his descendants.

=== Indrabala ===
Udayana's son Indrabala is the earliest ruler of the dynasty certainly known to have ruled over at least a part of Dakshina Kosala. The Kharod Lakshmaneshvara Temple inscription credits him with destroying his enemies, and states that "the rows of the crest-jewels of all the princes adorned his lotus-like feet". This description suggests that he was a sovereign monarch for some time. The inscription also mentions a town called Indrapura, which served as the headquarters of a Vishaya (district). The name of the town suggests that it was established by Indrabala.

Historian A. M. Shastri dates Indrabala's reign to c. 620-640 CE. According to him, it is possible that when the forces of the northern emperor Harsha advanced up to Kalinjar, Indrabala was forced to leave his ancestral principality, and migrated southwards to Dakshina Kosala. Indrabala can be identified with Maha-samanta ("great feudatory") Indrabala-raja who held the office of Sarvādhikārādhikṛta under the Sharabhapuriya king Sudevaraja, as attested by the Dhamtari and Kauvatal inscriptions of the Sharabhapuriyas. He seems to have established da new kingdom after the fall of the Sharabhapuriyas, taking advantage of the political chaos in the region.

Scholar Lochan Prasad Pandeya identified Indrabala as a grandson of the Mekala Panduvamshi king Bharatabala alias Indra. Relying on this identification, historian V. V. Mirashi theorized that the Uchchhakalpas invaded Mekala, forcing Indrabala to migrate to Kosala, where he first ruled as a Sharabhapuriya feudatory, and later, overthrew his overlords. However, this identification is based solely on similar-sounding names ("Indrabala" and "Bharatabala alias Indra"), and cannot be considered as certain.

=== Indrabala's successors ===
The order of succession after Indrabala is not clear. The Arang stone inscription from the reign of Indrabala's son Nannaraja I states that Indrabala had a brother, although the name of the brother is lost in the damaged portion. It compares the brother to the legendary hero Krishna, who followed his brother Bala, and destroyed his enemies. This description suggests that Indrabala's brother helped him consolidate his power in Dakshina Kosala. The inscription terms the brother as nṛpa ("king").

Bhavadeva, the fourth son of Indrabala's brother, is termed as a nṛpa and as the "lord of the earth" in the Arang inscription. He bore the following titles:

- Ranakesarin ("battle-lion"), because he killed the enemy elephants with his sword on the battlefield)
- Chinta-durga, because he caused anxiety (chinta) to his enemies, and because the rival warriors found him difficult to surpass (durga) in combat
- Apriya-vaishika ("disdainful of prostitutes")

Indrabala's son Ishanadeva granted some villages for the maintenance of the Lakshmaneshvara Temple at Kharod, which suggests that he was also a ruler. Nannaraja I, another son of Indrabala, bore the title Rajadhiraja ("king of kings"), and the subsequent rulers of the dynasty descended from him.

It is possible that Bhavadeva, Ishanadeva, and Nannaraja I, all ruled different parts of the kingdom simultaneously; Nannaraja I subsequently acquired control of the entire kingdom, either by forcibly dethroning the other two rulers, or after the other two rulers died without heirs. Alternatively, it is possible that Bhavadeva and Ishanadeva ruled as subordinates of Nannaraja I. A third possibility is that Indrabala's brother ruled as a feudatory: his son Bhavadeva became the next king, because at the time of Indrabala's death, Indrabala's sons Ishanadeva and Nannaraja I were too young to ascend the throne. Subsequently, Nannaraja I ascended the throne, and Ishanadeva ruled as his feudatory.

=== Tivaradeva ===
Nannaraja I was succeeded by his son Tivaradeva, who is also known as Mahashiva Tivara. The name "Tivaradeva" occurs on the seal of his inscriptions, and appears to have been his personal name. The name "Mahashiva Tivara" occurs in the text of the inscriptions, and was probably his coronation name. J. F. Fleet wrongly believed him to be an adopted son of Nannaraja I, based on the Rajim inscription, which contains a scribal error. The other two inscriptions of the king - discovered at Bonda and Baloda - make it clear that Tivaradeva was a biological son of Nannaraja I.

Tivaradeva's inscriptions state that his feet were "rubbed by the edges of the crowns of many chiefs", which indicates that he considered himself to be a paramount sovereign. The seals of the inscriptions describe him as Kosaladhipati ("Lord of Kosala"), and the text of the inscriptions states that he had the overlordship of the entire Kosala (sakala-kosala-adhipatya).

Tivaradeva also seems to have invaded the neighbouring Shailodbhava territory in present-day Odisha. The Adbhar inscription of his son Nannaraja II states that his father had become the master of Kosala, Utkala (in present-day Odisha) and other regions "by the prowess of his own arms". The inscription describes Nannaraja II as the master of Kosala only, which indicates that the Panduvamshi control over other territories did not last long. An inscription of the Shailodbhava king Dharmaraja II (alias Manabhita) states that his brother Madhava tried to overthrow him, but was defeated at Phasika; Madhava then allied with king Trivara, but Dharmaraja defeated both rival kings at the foot of the Vindhyas. The Trivara of Dharamraja's inscription can be identified with Tivaradeva.

Tivaradeva was succeeded by his son Nannaraja II, after whom the throne passed to his brother Chandragupta. He was one of the dynasty's most powerful rulers, but his name was omitted in the records of Chandragupta and the subsequent kings, as he was not their ancestor.

=== Nannaraja II ===
Nannaraja II alias Maha-Nannaraja is attested by his Adbhar inscription. The inscription seems to have been incomplete for some reason, as indicated by the absence of a seal, the incomplete imprecatory stanza at the end, and the missing date. It compares him and his father to Pradyumna and Krishna respectively, and describes him as the enemy of Kaitabha.

Nannaraja II may have expanded the Panduvamshi kingdom to include Vidarbha. This is suggested by the Sonakpaat (Senkapat) stone slab inscription issued during the reign of the later Panduvamshi king Shivagupta Balarjuna. The inscription mentions three generations of a family of Panduvamshi vassals: Shiva-rakshita, Deva-rakshita, and Durga-rakshita. It states that Deva-rakshita was a confidant of Nannaraja, who had given him the Vindhyan territory extending up to the Varada river (modern Wardha River in Vidarbha). Since Durga-rakshita was a contemporary of Balarjuna, the Nannaraja mentioned in this inscription must have been Nannaraja II (It is unlikely that Nannaraja I, who ruled much earlier, was a contemporary of Durga-rakshita's father Deva-rakshita). This suggests that a portion of Vidarbha was under the rule of Nannaraja II, although based on the available evidence, it cannot be determined for how long the Panduvamshis continued to control this territory. A Rashtrakuta feudatory chief named Nannaraja is known to have ruled in a part of Vidarbha during the late 7th century and early 8th century, but it is not certain if he was related to the Panduvamshi king Nannaraja II in any way.

Nannaraja II probably died without an heir, because of which he was succeeded by his uncle Chandragupta.

=== Chandragupta and Harshagupta ===
Chandragupta was a son of Nannaraja I, and must have ascended the throne at an old age, as he succeeded his nephew Nannaraja II. The Sirpur Lakshmana temple inscription of his grandson Balarjuna contains vague references to his military achievements, and describes him as a nrpati (king) who was "the lord of the rulers of the earth".

According to the Sanjan inscription of the Rashtrakuta king Amoghavarsha I, his father Govinda III defeated a ruler called Chandragupta. Historian D. R. Bhandarkar identified this defeated ruler as the Panduvamshi king Chandragupta, but this identification is not correct: it results in chronological impossibilities, and moreover, the Sanjan inscription mentions Kosala as a later, distinct conquest of Govinda III.

Chandragupta was succeeded by his son Harshagupta, who is known from the inscriptions issued during the reign of his successor Balarjuna. The introductory portion of these inscriptions calls him Harshadeva, while the seal of the inscriptions calls him Harshagupta. He married Vasata, a daughter of king Suryavarman. He was a Vaishnavite, and after his death, his wife Vasata built a Vishnu temple in his memory.

=== Maha-Shivagupta Balarjuna ===
Balarjuna was a son of his predecessor Harshagupta and queen Vasata. His own copper-plate inscriptions call him Maha-Shivagupta, and the seals of these inscriptions call him Shivagupta; the other inscriptions issued during his reign generally call him either Shivagupta or Balarjuna, except one inscription that calls him Maha-Shivagupta. Balarjuna was probably his personal name, and Mahashivagupta was probably his coronation name.

An inscription dated to his 57th regnal year has been discovered, indicating that he ruled for at least 57 years. His younger brother Ranakesarin supported him in his military conquests. He had a son named Shivanandin.

=== Decline ===
There is no record of Panduvamshis after Balarjuna, and their rule in Dakshina Kosala probably ended in the 8th century. Their territory was subsequently ruled by the Nalas, the Banas and the Kalachuris. An inscription of the Nala king Vilasatunga, dated to the 8th century based on palaeographic grounds, records the construction of the Rajiv Lochan temple at Rajim. This suggests that the Nalas (possibly a branch of the earlier Nala dynasty) had conquered the area around present-day Raipur by the 8th century.

=== Possible successors ===
The Somavamshi dynasty, which ruled in present-day Odisha between 9th and 12th centuries appears to have been related to the Panduvamshis of Dakshina Kosala. Both dynasties claimed lunar lineage. The Somavamshis did not claim descent from the legendary Pandavas, but this is also true for the Panduvamshis after Tivaradeva. Like the later Panduvamshis, the Somavamshi kings adopted names ending in -gupta. Multiple Somavamshi rulers bore the regnal name "Maha-shiva-gupta"; the Panduvamshi kings Tivaradeva and Balarjuna bore the regnal titles "Maha-shiva" and "Maha-shiva-gupta" respectively. While the Panduvamshi copper-plate inscriptions are inscribed using "box-headed" characters, all the stone inscriptions starting from the reign of Balarjuna are inscribed in the Nagari script, which is also the script of the Somavamshi inscriptions. The early Somavamshi kings ruled in western Odisha, which once formed the eastern part of Dakshina Kosala, and the Choudwar inscription of the earliest known Somavamshi king Mahashivagupta I (alias Janamejaya) describes him as Kosalendra ("lord of Kosala"). Several Somavamshi inscriptions record grants to people from Kosala, grants of villages located in Kosala, and appointment of Kosala-specific officers.

== Religion ==
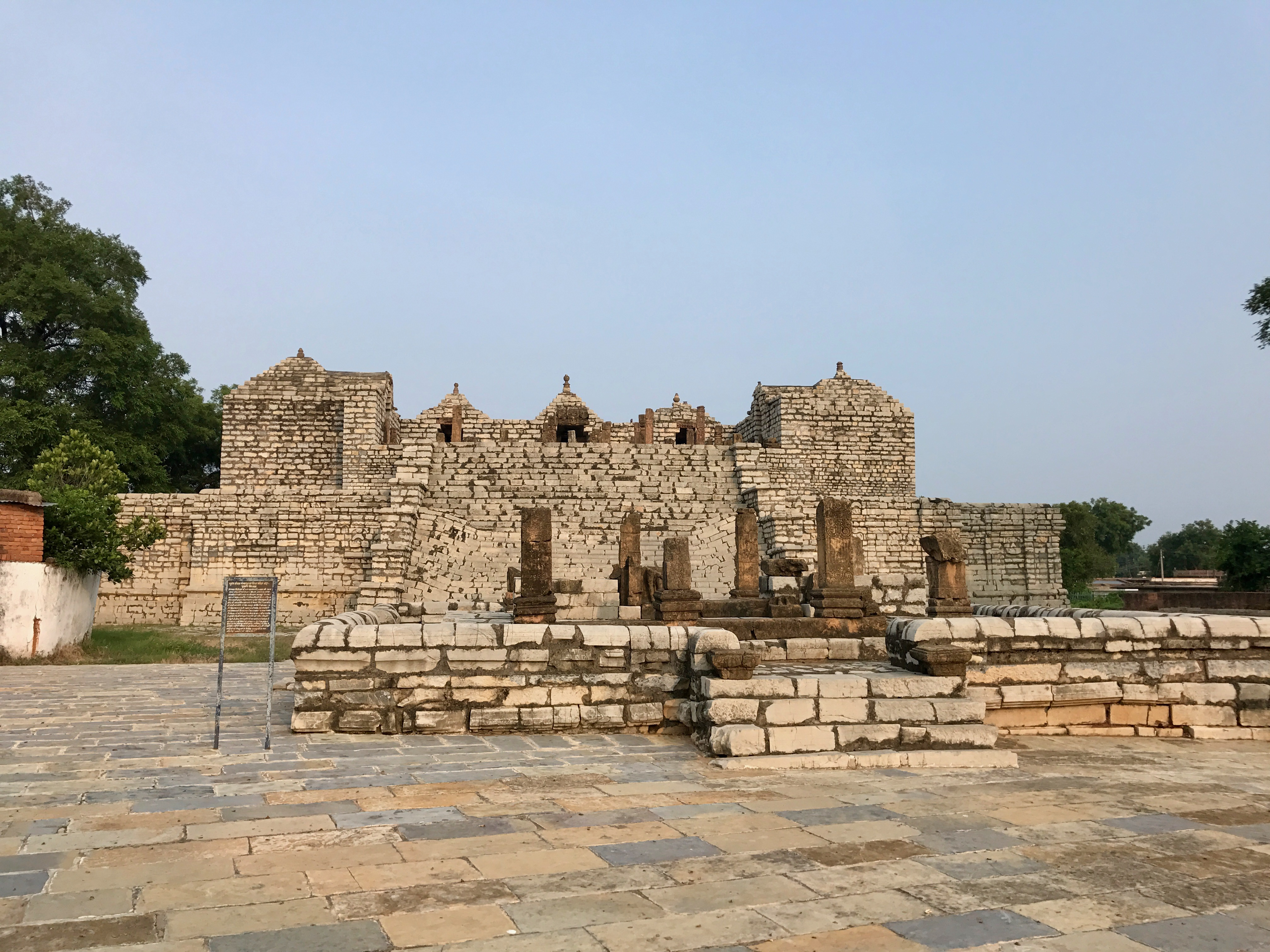
Surang tila temple, Sirpur Group of Monuments, 9th century CE.

The Panduvamshi kings generally followed Hindu traditions, although they were also tolerant towards Buddhism. Bhavadeva patronized Buddhism, and restored a Buddhist shrine originally built by Suryaghosha. Under his patronage, the monastery attached to the shrine was painted and adorned with a stepped well and gardens. Ishanadeva constructed the Lakshmaneshvara temple at Kharod, and granted some villages for its maintenance. Nannaraja I was probably a Shaivite, as a Sirpur stone inscription of his descendant Balarjuna states that he "covered the earth" with Shiva temples.

Tivaradeva was a Vaishnavite, as evident by his title Parama-Vaishnava, and his seals featured Vaishnavite emblems. His son Nannaraja II also bore the title Parama-Vaishnava, and his Adbhar inscription records a grant to a Bhagavata, that is, a Vaishnavite. This inscription compares Tivaradeva to Vishnu's incarnation Krishna, and Nannaraja II to Krishna's son Pradyumna.

The dynasty's inscriptions describe Harshagupta as someone who worshipped Achyuta (that is, Vishnu) all the time. His wife Vasata commissioned the Lakshmana temple at Sirpur: a commemorative stone inscription installed by her has been found at the site.

Shivagupta alias Balarjuna was a Shaivite, and his seal featured Shiva's bull nandin. He granted a village to a Buddhist monastery at the request of his maternal uncle Bhaskaravarman (a brother of Vasata).

== Inscriptions ==
The following inscriptions of the Pāṇḍuvaṁśins, all in Sanskrit, have been discovered.

Location	Type	Issuer	Regnal year	Place of issue	Source
Arang	stone	Nannaraja I / Bhavadeva	Undated	?	
Bonda	copper-plates	Tivaradeva	5	Shripura	
Rajim	copper-plates	Tivaradeva	7	Shripura	
Baloda	copper-plates	Tivaradeva	9	Shripura	
Adbhar	copper-plates	Nannaraja II	?	Shripura	
Bardula	copper-plates	Balarjuna	9	?	
Bonda	copper-plates	Balarjuna	22	?	
Lodhiya (Lodhia)	copper-plates	Balarjuna	57	?	
Malhar	copper-plates	Balarjuna	Undated	?	
Malhar	copper-plates	Balarjuna	Undated	?	
Sirpur (Lakshmana temple)	stone	Balarjuna	Undated	?	
Sirpur	stone slab	Balarjuna	Undated	?	
Sirpur	stone	Balarjuna	Undated	?	
Sirpur (Gandhareshvara temple)	?	Balarjuna	?	Undated	
Sonakpaat (also Senkapat or Senakapat)		Shivagupta	Undated	?	
Sirpur (Gandhareshvara temple)	?	?	Undated	?	
?	copper-plate	Balarjuna	57	?	
