= Harshagupta =

Indian ruler

Harshagupta was a ruler of the Panduvamshi dynasty of Dakshina Kosala, who ruled Dakshina Kosala in present-day Chhattisgarh and some other parts. The famous Laxman temple at Sirpur was built by his widow Vasata in his memory.

== Biography ==
Harshagupta succeeded his father, Chandragupta to the Panduvamshi throne. Harshagupta is known from the inscriptions issued during the reign of his son and successor Balarjuna. The introductory portion of these inscriptions calls him Harshadeva, while the seal of the inscriptions calls him Harshagupta. He married Vasata, a daughter of King Suryavarman of Magadha. He was a Vaishnavite.

== Death and succession ==
After his death, his wife Vasata built a Vishnu temple in his memory, which was the Laxman temple. He was succeeded by his son Balarjuna, who was the most successful ruler of the Panduvamshi dynasty of Dakshina Kosala.

== See also ==
- Suryavarman of Magadha
- Maha-Shivagupta Balarjuna
- Panduvamshis of Dakshina Kosala
