= Sirpur Group of Monuments =

Archaeological site in Chhattisgarh, India

Group of monuments at Sirpur
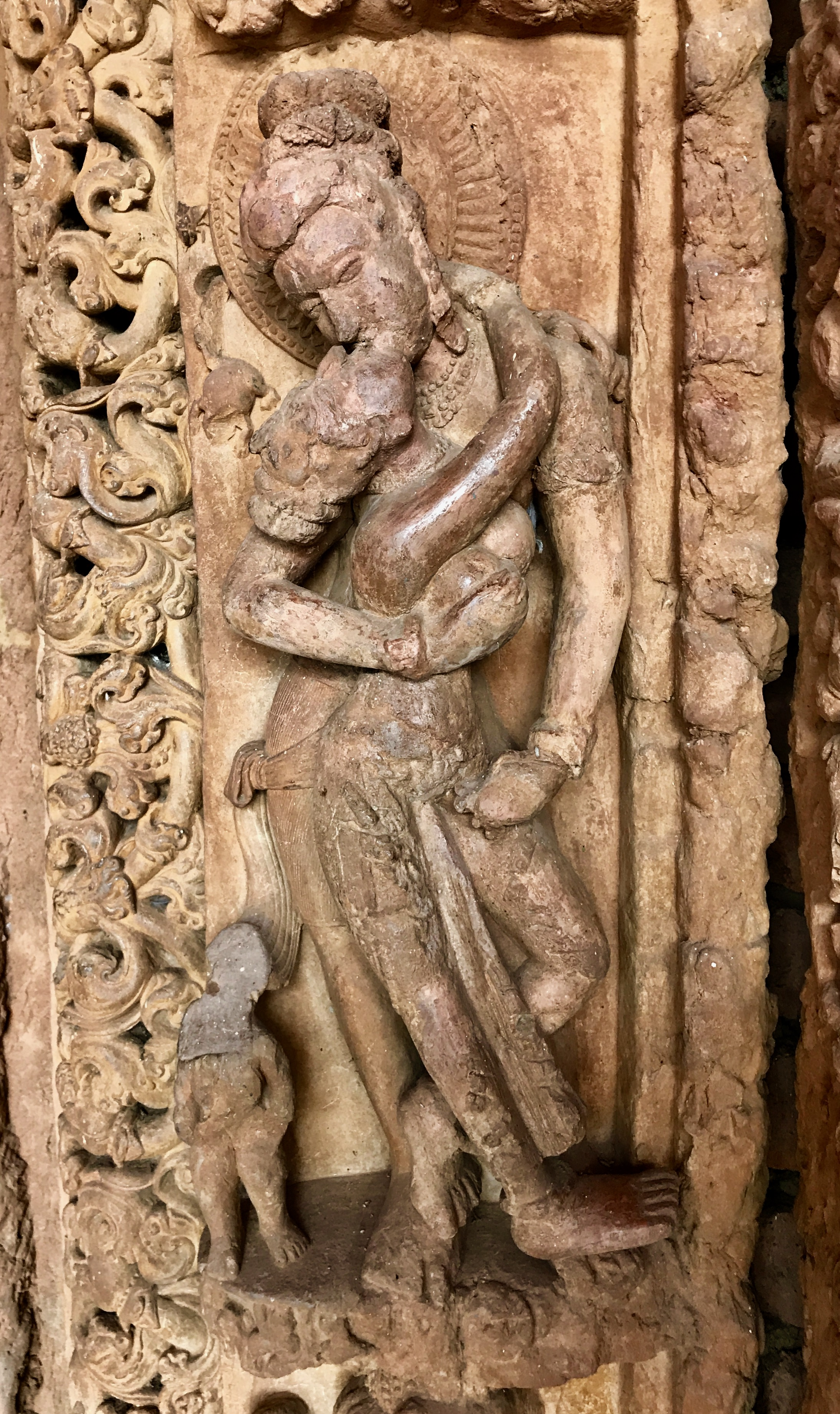
- An 8th-century kissing couple artwork excavated at Sirpur

- Location of Sirpur Sirpur Group of Monuments (Chhattisgarh)
- 21.345225°N 82.184814°E
- Location: Sirpur, Mahasamund district, Chhattisgarh, India
- Nearest city: Raipur

History
- Built: 4th–12th century CE

Site notes
- Governing body: Archaeological Survey of India

Sirpur Group of Monuments are an archaeological and tourism site containing Hindu, Jain and Buddhist monuments from the 5th to 12th centuries in Mahasamund district of the state of Chhattisgarh, India. Located near an eponymous village, it is 78 kilometres (48 mi) east of Raipur, the capital of the state. The site is spread near the banks of the river Mahanadi.

The town of Sirpur (aka Shirpur) has been mentioned in epigraphic and textual records dated to the 5th to the 8th centuries CE. The city was once the capital of the Sharbhapuriya and Somavamshi kings of Dakshina Kosala state. It was an important Hindu, Buddhist and Jain settlement of the South Kosala kingdom between the 5th and the 12th century CE. It was visited by Hieun Tsang, the 7th century Chinese Buddhist pilgrim. Recent excavations have uncovered 12 Buddhist viharas, 1 Jain vihara, monolithic statues of Buddha and Mahavira, 22 Shiva temples and 5 Vishnu temples, Shakti and Tantric temples, underground granary market and a sixth-century bath house.

== History ==
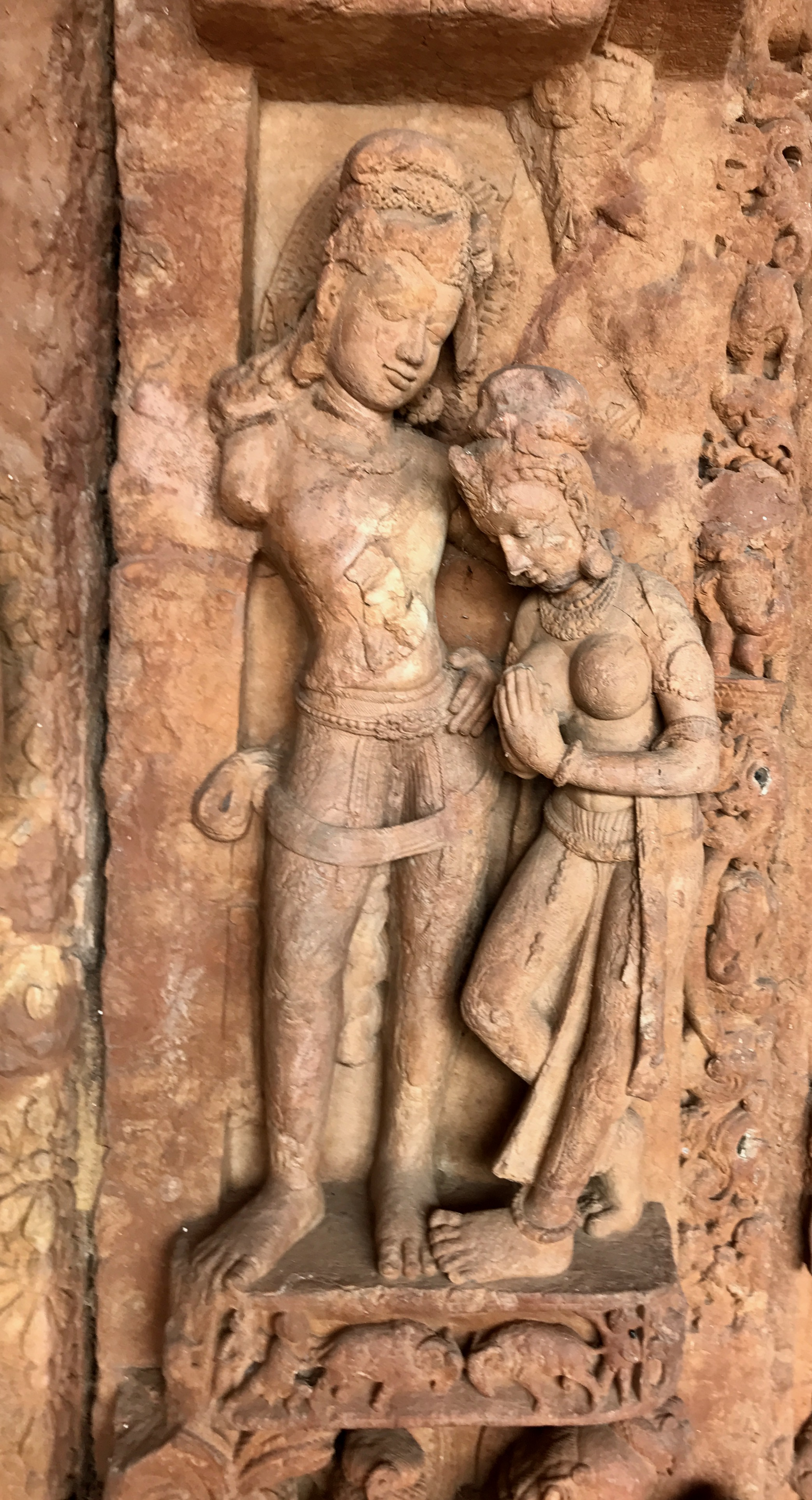
Sirpur relief excavated: she steps on his feet, seeks forgiveness with a namaste gesture.

Sirpur, also referred to as Shripur and Sripura (lit. 'city of auspiciousness, abundance, Lakshmi') in ancient Indian texts and inscriptions, is a village on the Mahanadi River 78 kilometres (48 mi) east of Raipur. Allahabad Pillar inscription dated 4th century CE mentions Sirpur as Sripura. In the second half of the 1st millennium CE, it was the capital city with major commercial and religious significance for the Dakshina Kosala kingdom. The earliest documented evidence states that it was first a capital of Sharabhapuriya dynasty, followed by Panduvamshi dynasty. The Sharabhapuriya dynasty itself is dated to the late 5th century CE, but inscriptions mention its first capital to be Sharabhapura, as yet an unknown site.

The abundant inscriptions of the mid-6th century CE in the region mention the Hindu Shaiva king Teevardeva and 8th-century king Shivagupta Balarjuna establishing temples and monasteries for Hindus, Buddhists and Jains in his kingdom. The Chinese pilgrim and traveller Huen T'sang mentions visiting Sirpur in 639 CE in his memoirs. He wrote that the king was a Kshatriya and benevolent to the Buddhists, the region was prosperous. According to his memoir, some 10,000 Mahayana Buddhist bhikshus (monks) lived here in some 100 monasteries, and there were over 100 temples.

The earliest dated Sirpur monument is the Lakshmana temple, dated to 595-605 CE. Along with it, numerous other temples along the Mahanadi River stretching over 150 kilometres (93 mi) from Rajim to Kharod have been located and dated to between 600 and 710 CE.

The South Kosala kingdom, along with the capital Sirpur, was taken over by the Kalachuri dynasty in the 11th century, with eastern parts of the South Kosala taken over by the Somavamshi kingdom to their east. The 12th century and 13th century history of the region is unclear. Excavations in the region have yielded layers of deposits, traceable from the mid 1st millennium BCE, the Gupta Empire period, through the late medieval period with the youngest layer of deposits being ruins mixed with chilum (smoke pipe) and Sultanate era coins suggesting that Sirpur was an active human settlement at least through the early Delhi Sultanate.

=== Archaeological site ===
Sirpur became a major archaeological site after it was visited in 1882 by Alexander Cunningham, a colonial British India official. His report on a Laxman (Lakshmana) temple at Sirpur brought it to international attention. The site remained neglected in early 20th-century during the decades of the World Wars, and excavations resumed in 1953. There were further excavations in 1990s and then particularly after 2003 when 184 mounds were identified and some selectively excavated. Those excavations have so far yielded 22 Shiva temples, 5 Vishnu temples, 10 Buddha Viharas, 3 Jain Viharas, a 6th/7th century market and snana-kund (bath house). The site shows extensive syncretism, where Buddhist and Jain statues or motifs intermingle with Shiva, Vishnu and Devi temples.

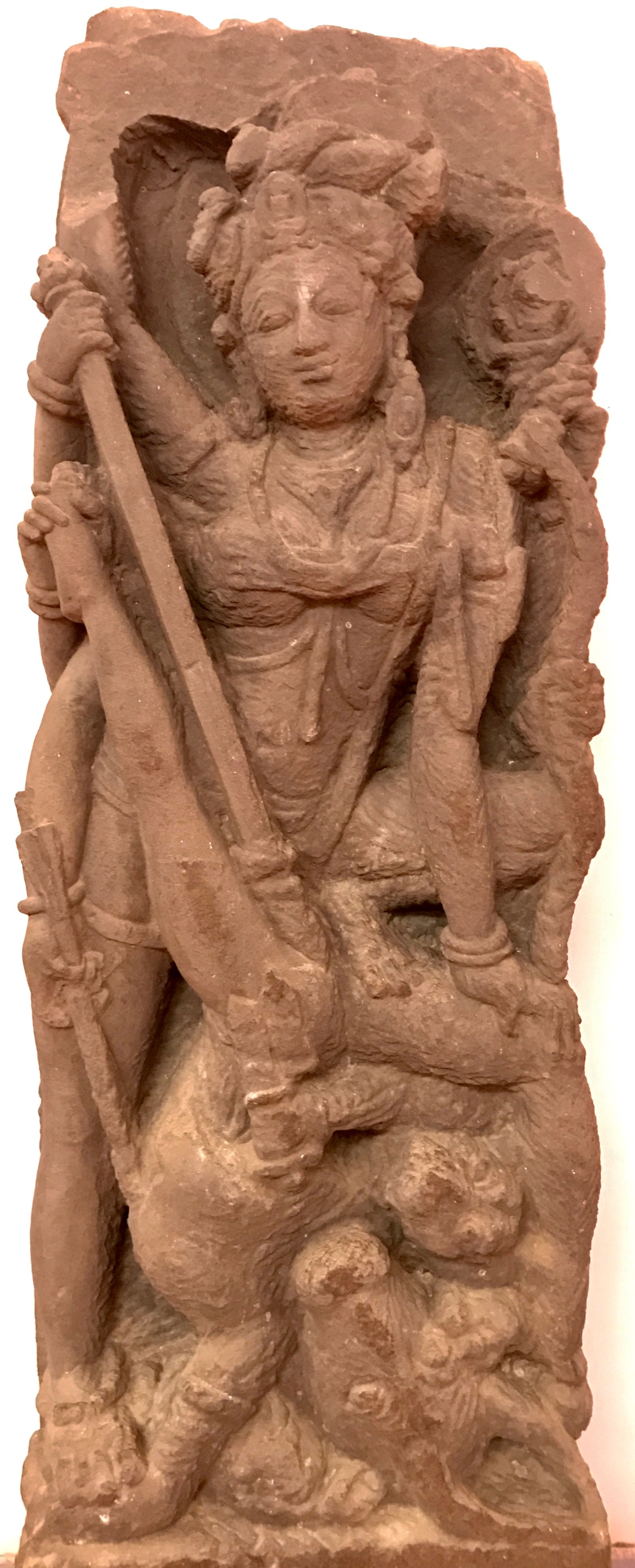
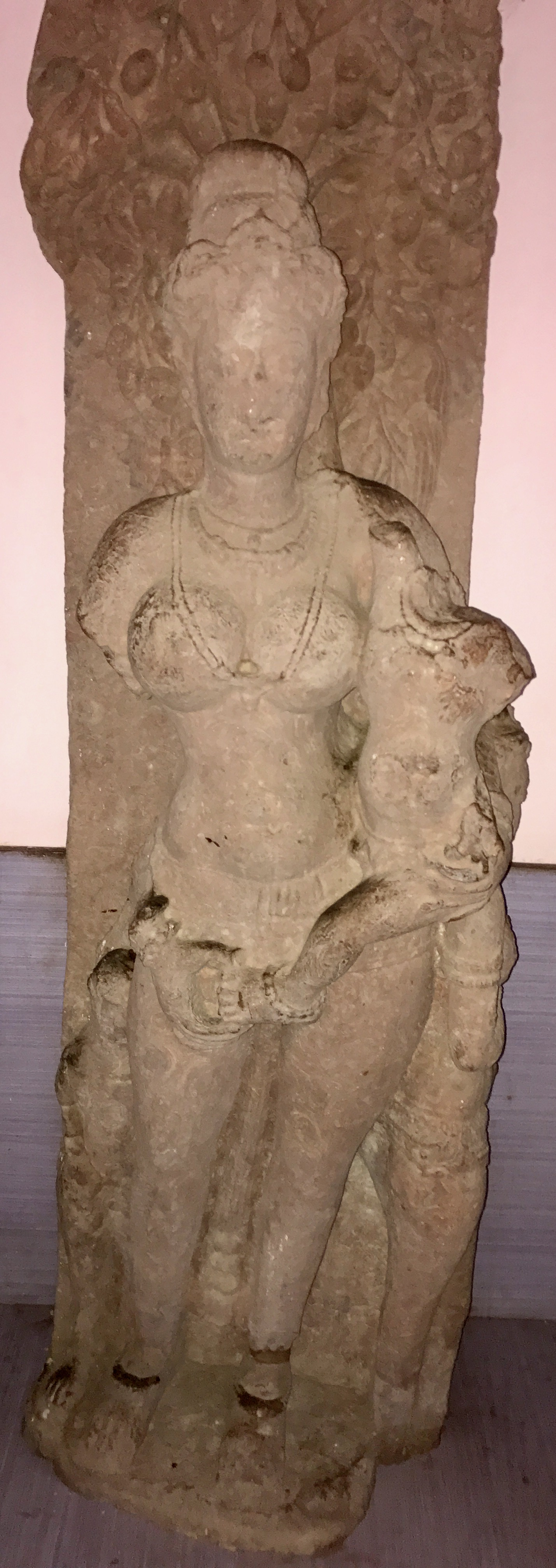
Artwork from Hindu temple ruins in Sirpur; left: Durga as Mahishasuramardini; right: A woman carrying a baby.

There are two theories on the demise of Sirpur city and what led to the capital's sudden ruin. One posits that an earthquake leveled the entire region and people abandoned the capital and the kingdom. Another posits a catastrophic destruction after invasion and plunder. Coins of Sultan Alaud din Khalji of the Delhi Sultanate have been found among the ruins, and the stairs of one of the monuments show signs of partial caving in, neither establishes nor rules out the proposals. The discovery of Khalji era coins mixed with the ruins during the excavation can be attributed to other reasons such as trade between Delhi Sultanate and Dakshina Kosala kingdom, and a spot caving in can be because of localized soil subsidence.

Sirpur is also a major archaeological site for "bronze sculptures from the early medieval period". According to Geri Hockfield Malandra, Sirpur was a significant bronze workshop of ancient India and the Buddhist bronze artwork excavated from Sirpur are among the "finest bronze sculptures" of that era. There are striking similarities between the artwork in Sirpur and the Ellora Caves as well as Ratnagiri, according to Malandra, and this may suggest a flow of ideas and artists between the two regions.

== Hindu monuments ==
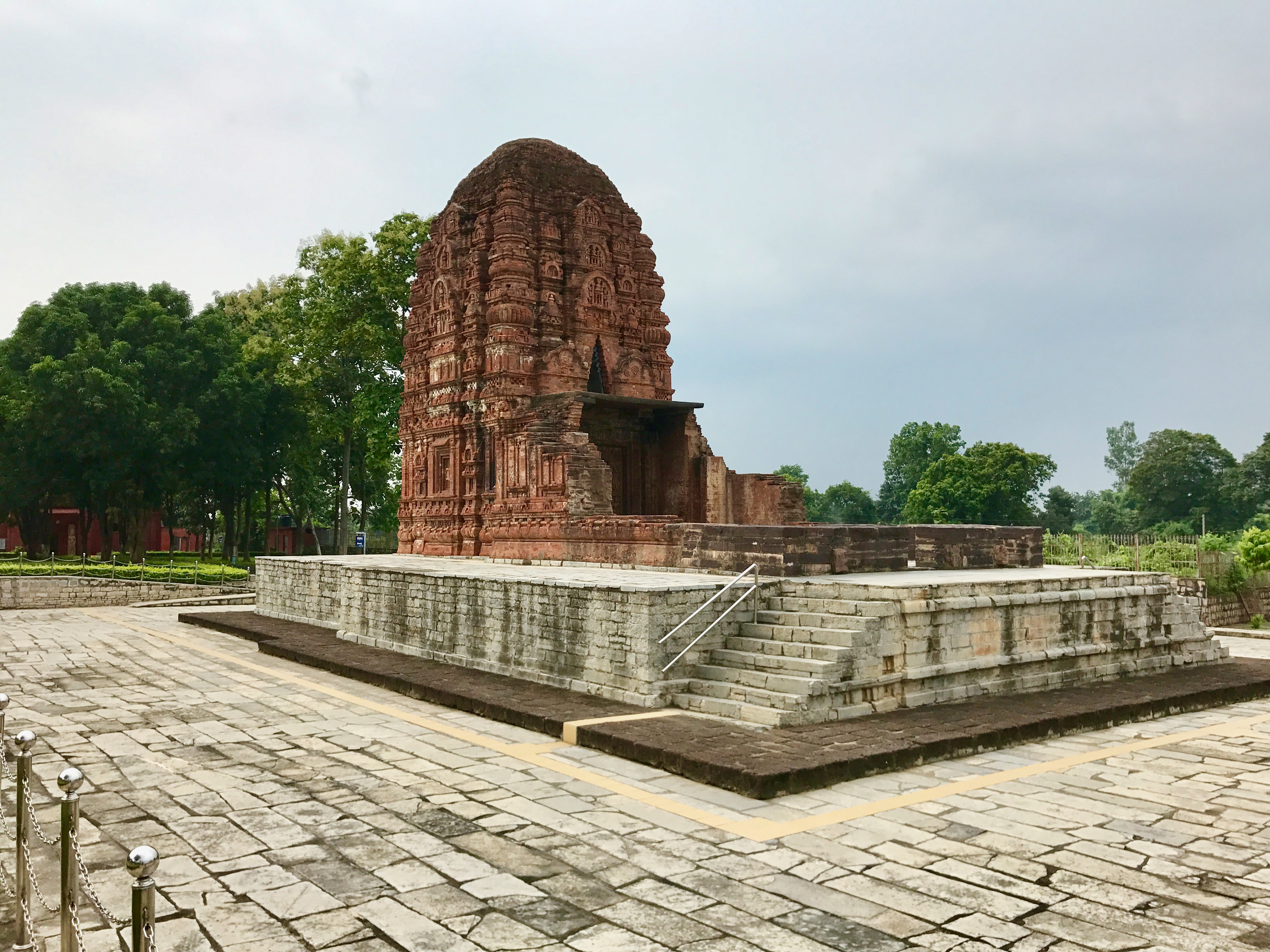
Laxman temple at Sirpur

=== Lakshmana temple ===
The Lakshmana temple, also spelled Laxman temple, is a 7th-century brick temple, mostly damaged and ruined. The garbhagriya entrance along with the tower and door carvings of the Lakshmana temple at Sirpur are reasonably intact enough to be studied. Above the sanctum door's lintel are carvings show a reclining Vishnu on Sesha (Anantasayana Vishnu) and a panel on Krishna from Bhagavata Purana. Around the door are bands of carvings which show the ten avatars of Vishnu along with daily life and couples in various stages of courtship and mithuna. The temple stands on a stone jagati platform (about 40 by 80 feet (12 m × 24 m)) with wide enough space for circumambulation. The temple itself is built of brick except for the carved frame around the grabha-griya (sanctum) made of stone. The sanctum opens to the east. In front of the sanctum is the outline of an antarala (vestibule), and an oblong mandapa (ceremonial community hall). The hall shows stub places for pillars, all now lost to history. Except for the sanctum and the tower, much is in ruins. The sanctum stone frame outside is a 22 by 22 feet (6.7 m × 6.7 m) square, inside it is about 10 by 10 feet (3.0 m × 3.0 m) square. The sanctum walls are plain like typical Hindu temples. The original statue of sanctum is missing. The site management has installed several small statues for visitors from what was found in the ruins pile.

=== Rama temple ===
Rama temple is situated less than 100 metres (330 ft) southeast of the Lakshmana temple, but it is almost entirely in ruins. The Rama temple site, however, does preserve the foundation outline of several shrines as well as brick stub of the lower part of the original Rama temple. Immediately to the north of the Rama temple is an outline which local tradition states was also dedicated to Lakshmana as Rama-Lakshmana pair. The Rama temple follows a stellate (star-shape) jagati pattern, while its Lakshmana pair was without one. The mandapa and other features of the Rama were destroyed long ago, according to Donald Stadtner, and the Rama temple site is likely to be from about 600 CE. This is one of the earliest star shape jagati platform temple in central India. It may have served as a prototype practice temple, before Sirpur architects of the 7th century built much grander stellate-principle Hindu temples in Kharod, Palari and Rajim.

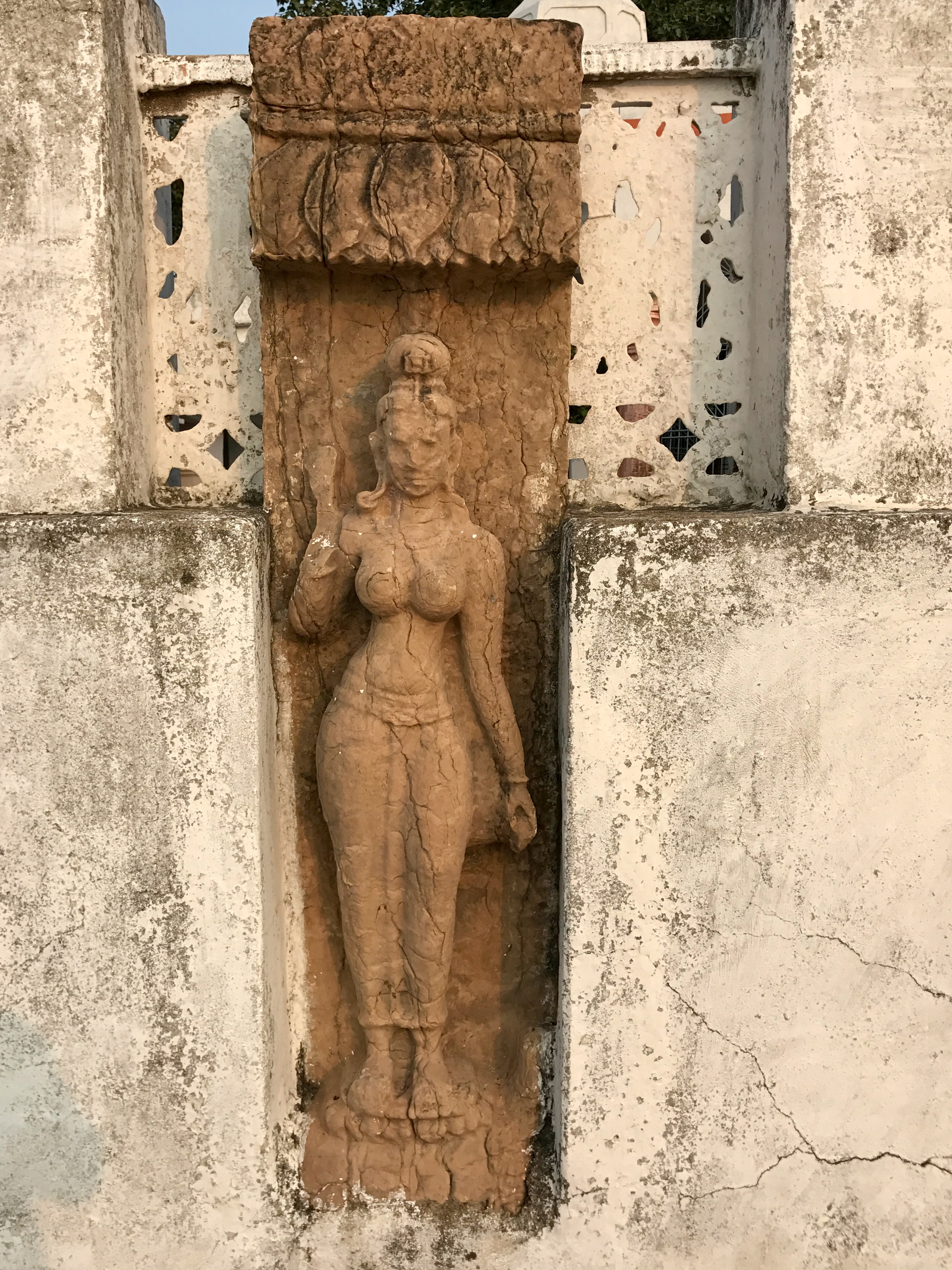
Artwork on the riverside walls of Gandheshwar Shiva temple.

=== Gandheshwar temple ===
Gandheshwar Temple: an active Shiva temple, Gandheshwar temple is situated on the banks of the Mahanadi River. From the river, there are stone stairs to walk to the sanctum. The temple is routinely re-washed and re-painted. It likely includes recovered ruins from the area, in which the locals have included Hindu, Buddhist and Jain iconography. A stone slab that is part of the temple wall has a Bhramhi inscription in Nagari script, starting with Om symbol and dedicated to Lord Buddha, which has been dated to the 8th century.

=== Baleshwar Mahadev temples ===
Baleshwar Mahadev temples group: A Shiva temple about 50 metres (160 ft) northwest of the Teevar dev monument, across the Sirpur road. It consists of several temples. For three Shiva temples excavated, a circumambulatory Jagati in the form of a high-rise platform, similar to Lakshmana temple survives. For another only the foundation is visible. The cluster was built by the Shaiva king Shivagupta Balarjuna, and is dated to the mid-8th century. Two of the temples are located side by side, and unlike most Sirpur temples, these open to the west. Both have a mandapa, an antarala and have a star shaped garbha griya made out of bricks and stone. The stellate sanctum is formed out of two squares, one rotated by 45 degrees. Some of the artwork discovered during excavations are displayed, and these show women and couple standing dressed up in 8th-century attire. The sanctum has Shiva linga made from marble.

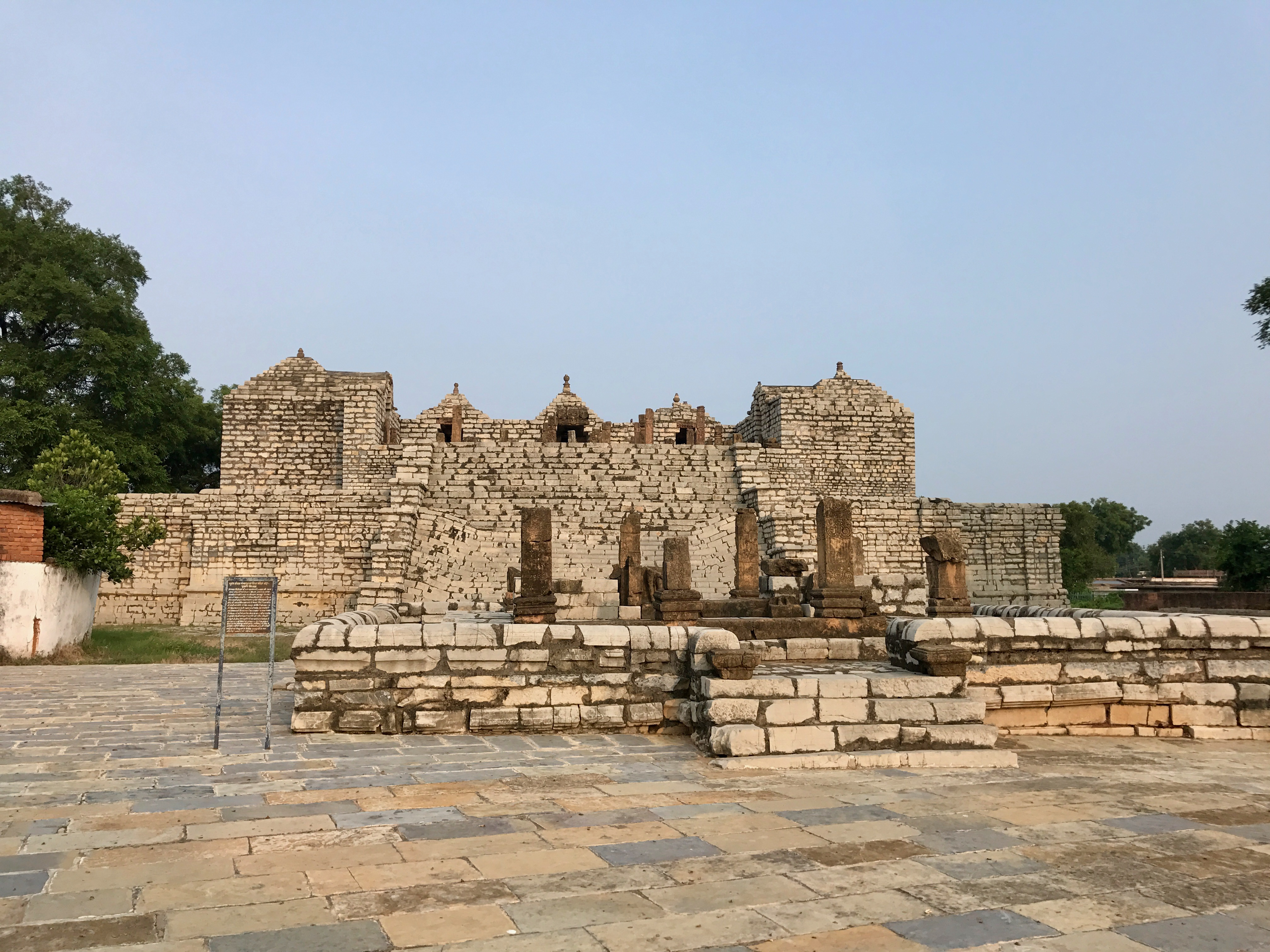
Surang tila temple, Sirpur.

=== Surang tila ===
Surang tila: It is the largest temple complex in Sirpur, with a pillared terrace raised 30 feet (9.1 m) above the group, stone steps connecting the terrace to the ruined mandapa platform remains below. The stairs have partially caved it in a spot from ground subsidence. The pillared terrace on the top was likely a mandapa, as it has ruins of many carved pillars in navaranga pattern. The terrace connects with five sanctums, which have two gray Shiva linga, one features a black granite Shiva linga and other two are dedicated to Vishnu. The temple is made out of white stone. It used to be a soil mound with tunnels (surang) used by the locals, but the temple was excavated between 2006 and 2007. An inscription was found during the excavation which is now in the Raipur museum. According to this inscription, this temple was operating during the time of Shivagupta Balarjuna, and the temple is dated to 7th or 8th century. Below the temple terrace, are ruins of two buildings, one likely a residence for Buddhist priests and monks, another a small tantric temple with 16-edge Shiva linga possibly from later centuries.

=== Other monuments ===
Rakela Tal, fort ruins and other temples: located south near the Rama temple on the east side of the Sirpur road is a man made lake full of lotus flowers. Around the lake are ruins of an old fort, several Hindu and Buddhist monuments mixed in with farmlands and a modern era Krishna temple. Sirpur has over 20 other excavated medieval temples and 50 additional unexcavated mounds spread over an area spanning 3 square kilometres (1.2 sq mi).

== Buddhist monuments ==
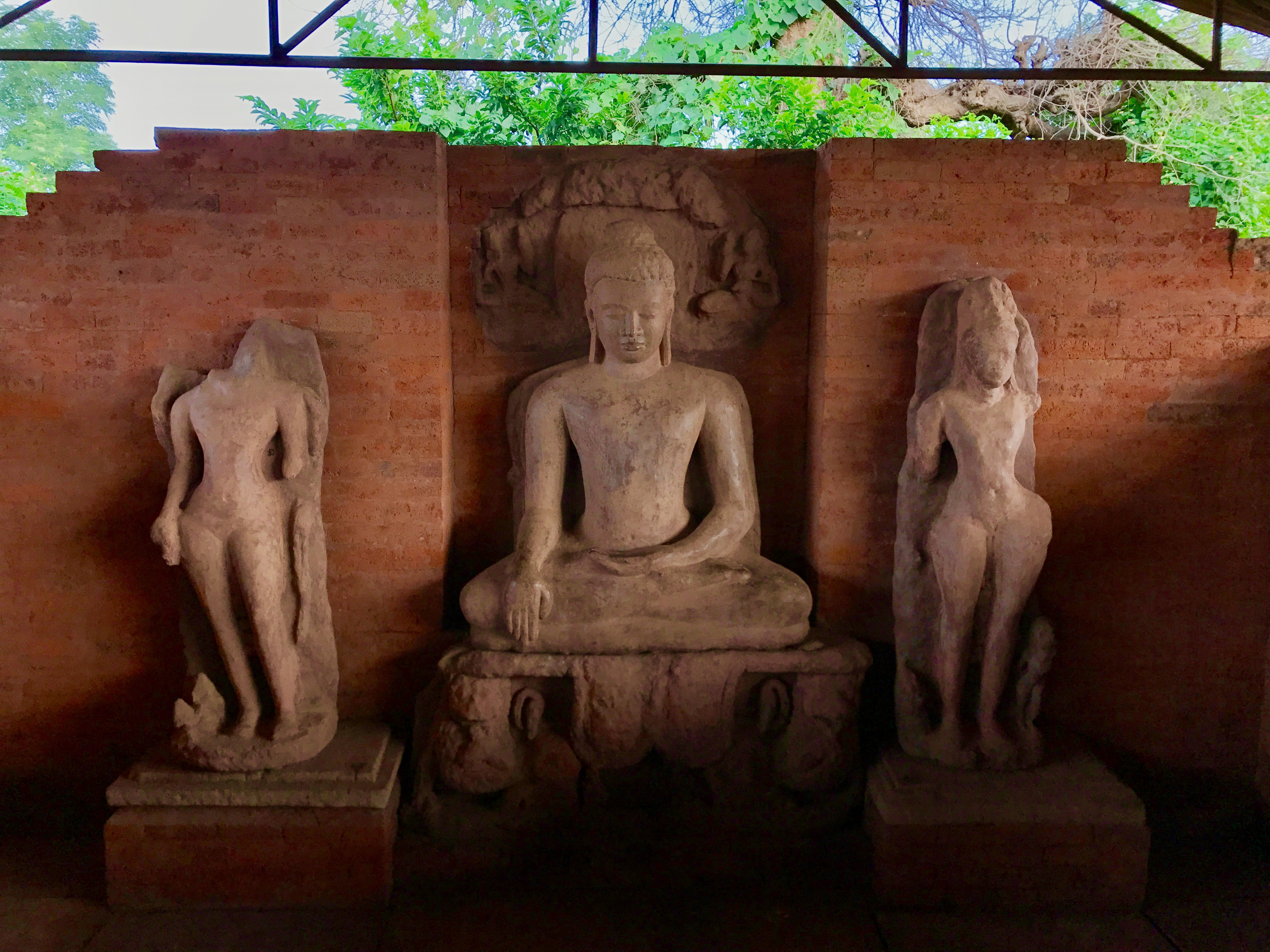
A Buddha statue excavated from monastery ruins.

=== Ananda Prabhu vihara ===
Ananda Prabhu Kuti vihara: a temple and 14-room monastery, built by Bhikshu Anand Prabhu, called Ananda Prabha in some inscriptions, with sponsorship from the Hindu king Sivagupta Balarjuna. The monastery and temple ruins included a monument to Avalokiteśvara and Makarwahini Gange. A stone inscription found at the site, in Sanskrit written in Nagari script and dated to mid 8th century CE uses a mix of Vedic meters (Anustubh, Sragdhara, Arya, Vasantatilaka and others). The inscription states starts with auspicious symbol Om and Siddham, praises Sugata (Buddha) then lauds king Balarjuna. It thereafter mentions monk Anandaprabha, devoted to the Buddha the Maravarin (enemy of Mara) and the destroyer of the cycle of rebirth and death. The inscription says the king established a "vihara kuti" (monastery residences) and a free feeding house for all the monks there furnished with setike and vyanjana (rice meal with condiments) for "so long as the sun adorns the sky" (perpetuity). The inscription poem thereafter reminds the monks to remember the spirit of the king's gift, the impermanence of wealth, that dharma is the only saving grace to suffering-filled worldly existence. The inscription is signed by the artist who created it for the monastery.

=== Swastika vihara ===
Swastika vihara: excavated in the 1950s, the aerial view of this monument's layout reminds of the swastika sign. This site yielded a Buddha statue and metallic idols relating to the Buddhist era. Along with Buddha was the image of Padamapani carrying a fly whisk.

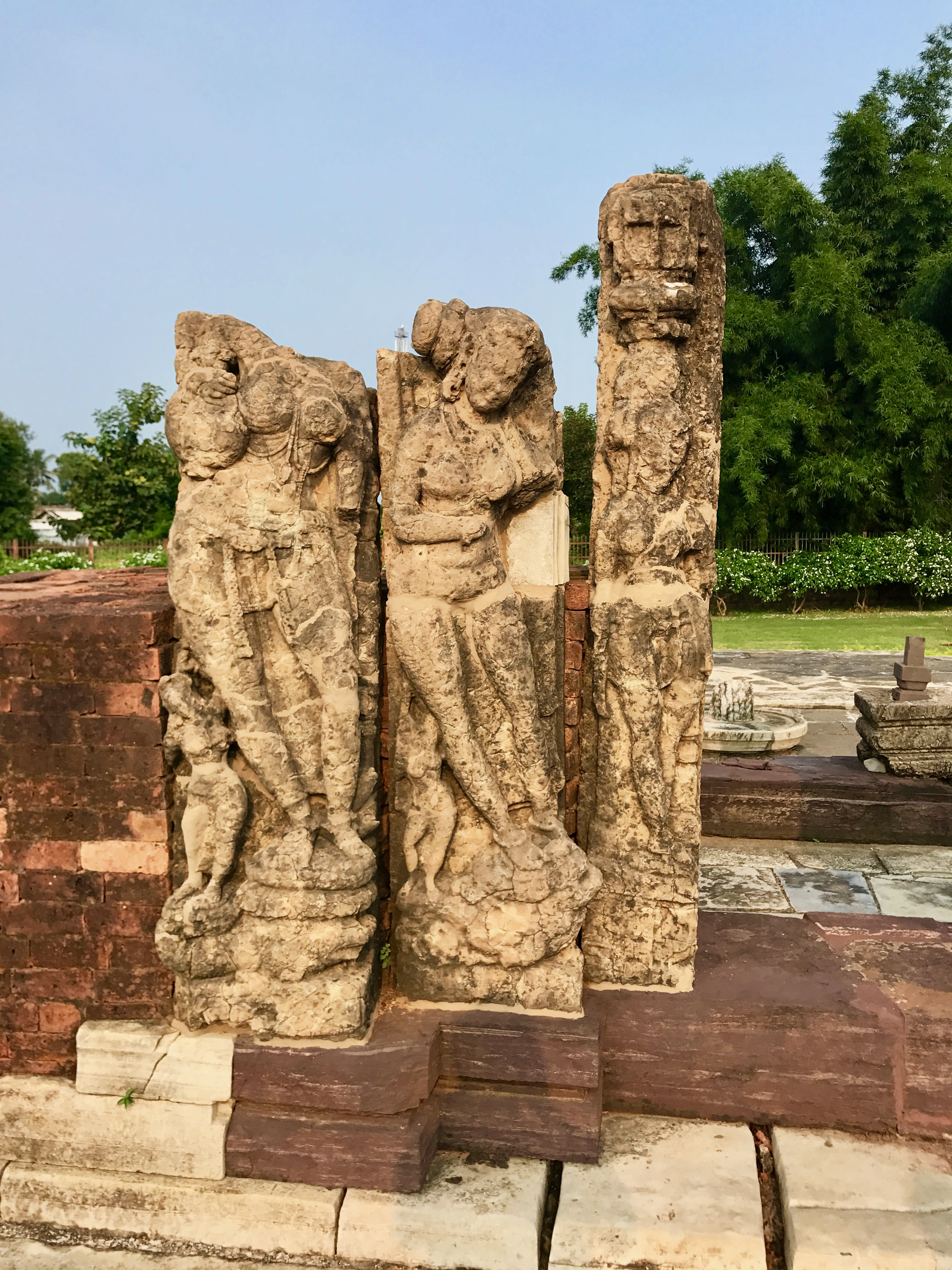
An excavated Sirpur Shiva temple

=== Teevardev ===
Teevar dev: a monastery from the Dakshina Kosala era, this Vihara, also referred to as Tivradeva, is located near a Shiva temple and is about 1 kilometre (0.62 mi) away from the Lakshmana temple. The temple is syncretic, built by a Shaiva king and his Buddhist queen, it shows Hindu and Buddhist themes. The monument is a syncretic collection of Buddhist and Hindu arts, as it shows along with Buddha statues and Buddhist artwork, Hindu themes such as Ganga and Yamuna goddesses, kama and mithuna scenes, Panchatantra tales as well as Gajalakshmi.

== Jain monuments ==
One Jain basati and monastery ruins has been discovered near the river banks and about 100 metres (330 ft) from an 8th-century Shiva temple. A bronze image of Adinatha (Rishbha, the first Tirthankara) was found in the ruins, and the image is dated to the 9th century.

== ASI Museum ==
A museum managed by Archaeological Survey of India in the Lakshmana temple premises preserves the artwork parts and pieces of archaeological ruins found during excavations in the 1950s and in the 2000s. These belong to Shaiva, Vaishnav, Buddha and Jain religions and variously dated to between 6th and 12th centuries.

== See also ==
- Aihole
- Badami cave temples
- Ellora Caves
- Mahakuta group of temples
- Pattadakal
- Alampur group of temples
