= Battle lion =

Battle lion or Battle Lion may refer to:

- Battle Lion, a He-Man and the Masters of the Universe character
- Ranakesarin ('battle-lion'), a title of Bhavadeva, of the Panduvamshis of Dakshina Kosala

== See also ==
- Battle of Lyon, fought in 197 CE
