= Maha-Shivagupta Balarjuna =

- Maharaja

last known and most powerful king of the Panduvamshi dynasty of Dakshina Kosala
- Reign: c. 730–790 CE
- Predecessor: Harshagupta
- Successor: possibly Shivanandin
- Issue: Shivanandin
- Father: Harshagupta
- Mother: Vasata
- Religion: Shaivism (Hinduism)

Maha-Shivagupta Balarjuna alias Shivagupta was the greatest and most powerful king of the Panduvamshi dynasty of Dakshina Kosala. Under him, Sirpur witnessed incredible growth in cultural and political activities.

== Name ==
His own copper-plate inscriptions call him Maha-Shivagupta, and the seals of these inscriptions call him Shivagupta; the other inscriptions issued during his reign generally call him either Shivagupta or Balarjuna, except one inscription that calls him Maha-Shivagupta. Balarjuna was probably his personal name, and Mahashivagupta was probably his coronation name.

== Personal life ==
Maha-Shivagupta Balarjuna was the son of Harshagupta and his queen Vasata. He succeeded his father after his death in 595 CE. He had a younger brother named Ranakesarin and a son named Shivanandin.

== Reign ==
His younger brother Ranakesarin supported him in his military conquests. Under his reign, Sirpur, the capital of the Panduvamshis, witnessed its golden age. The town witnessed incredible growth in cultural and political activities. Different religions were given royal patronage and various temples and monasteries were built. The Buddhist monastery at Sirpur, which is very important, was built by him. An inscription dated to his 57th regnal year has been discovered, indicating that he ruled for at least 57 years. He enjoyed a peaceful and prosperous reign, and the Panduvamshis probably reached their zenith under him. Different religions were given royal patronage and various temples and monasteries were built. The famous temple of Surang Tila was built by him.

=== Xuanzang's visit ===
Xuanzang, the Chinese monk, traveller, and pilgrim, would have probably visited Dakshina Kosala during the reign of Mahashivagupta Balarjuna.

He mentions Kosala, Kiao-sa-lo, a country about 5000 li in circuit. Without mentioning the name of the capital town, he tells it was 40 li in circuit. He describes its very dense population, men were tall, black complexioned, brave and impetuous. He found both heretics and believers here. The king, whose name he did not supply, was of kshatriya race but also honors the law of Buddha and his virtue and love were far renowned. There were about one hundred sangharamas housing less than 10000 priests, all belonging to Mahayana. There were also about seventy Deva temples. He also mentions a stupa built by the Maurya king Ashoka, where Buddha also showed his miracles. In the monastery attached to stupa was lived Nagarjuna bodhisattva.

Here is what Xuanzang describes Dakshina Kosala:

The capital is about 40 li round; the soil is rich and fertile, and yields abundant crops. [...] The population is very dense. The men are tall and black complexioned. The disposition of the people is hard and violent; they are brave and impetuous. There are both heretics and believers here. They are earnest in study and of a high intelligence. The king is of the Kshattriya race; he greatly honours the law of Buddha, and his virtue and love are far renowned. There are about one hundred saṅghārāmas, and somewhat less than 10,000 priests; they all alike study the teaching of the Great Vehicle. There are about seventy Deva temples, frequented by heretics of different persuasions. Not far to the south of the city is an old saṅghārāma, by the side of which is a stūpa that was built by Aśoka-rāja.

== Religion ==
Balarjuna was a Shaivite, and his seal featured Shiva's bull nandin. He granted a village to a Buddhist monastery at the request of his maternal uncle Bhaskaravarman (a brother of Vasata).

== Aftermath ==
Soon after Maha-Shivagupta Balarjuna, Sirpur lost its importance on the political stage, but its cultural importance continued. The dynasty also suffered some losses at the hands of the Nalas. The Panduvamshis of Dakshina Kosala started to decline after his death, and there is no record of Panduvamshi kings after him.

== Bibliography ==
- Shastri, Ajay Mitra (1995). Inscriptions of the Śarabhapurīyas, Pāṇḍuvaṁśins, and Somavaṁśins. New Delhi: Indian Council of Historical Research and Motilal Banarsidass, Delhi. ISBN 978-81-208-0635-1.
- "Sirpur- An Icon of Dakshina-Kosala: Indian History and Architecture". Puratattva. Archived from the original on 2022-02-13.
