= Adbhar =

- Town
- Location in Chhattisgarh, India Adbhar (India)
- Coordinates: 21.951415°N 83.02549°E
- Country: India
- State: Chhattisgarh
- District: Janjgir-Champa district

Government
  - Type: Nagar Panchayat
- Elevation: 235 m (771 ft)

Population (2001)
  - Total: 7,272
- Demonyms: Adbhariha (male), Adbharihin (female)

Languages
  - Official: Hindi, Chhattisgarhi
- Time zone: UTC+5:30 (IST)
- PIN: 495695
- Vehicle registration: CG-11

Adbhar (historically Ashtadwar) is a historical town and a nagar panchayat in Sakti district in the state of Chhattisgarh in India.

== History ==
Thirteen photos from the town have been preserved at British Library. Ancient copper plates issued by a historical king NannaRaja from capital of Sirpur, dating back to the 7th century have been collected from the town. Four books of exact sciences in Sanskrit have been collected by an American mathematician David Pingree from this town indicating the town's intellectual and social role since ancient times. Apart from that the town has also remains of Jain and Buddhist cultures, a number of Shiva lingas, large numbers of lakes (and ponds) which used to be 126 in numbers as believed locally, remains of moat of ancient kings and a lake (pond) with endangered species of giant sized Leatherback freshwater Turtle.

== Central province Gazzetter 1910 ==
"Adbhar. —A village in the Chandarpur estate about 40 miles from Bilaspur with a population of 1300(in 1910) persons. It contains an old temple of Devi of which two ornamental doorways remain. One of these, the gateway of the enclosure, is very severe in outline and very much like some of the later cave doorways such as are found at Ajanta. The other is the entrance of the shrine and has sculptured jambs like those at Rajim and Sirpur. On the corner of either jamb is a Naga figure, whose tails run up the sides and along the lintel. Here they meet a little central figure which is perhaps that of Garuda. On the site of this temple is a hut containing an image of Mahishasura Mardini, who is now worshipped as Kali. The hut also contains a Jain seated figure. The village has a number of old tanks and the traces of old forts with moats round them. It contains a primary school. The proprietor was a Chhattisgarhi Brahman who has four other villages." This is written in central province district gazetter book of 1910.

== Demographics ==
As per 2011 census, the town had population of 7,272 of which 3,572 are males while 3,700 are females. The population of children aged 0-6 is 897 which is 12.33% of total population. The female sex ratio is 1036 against state average of 991. Moreover, the child sex ratio in Adbhar is around 1039 compared to Chhattisgarh state average of 969.literacy rate is 73.74% higher than the state average of 70.28% with male literacy around 82.31% while the female literacy rate is 65.46%.Schedule Caste (SC) constitutes 24.71% while Schedule Tribe (ST) were 11.01% of total population. The population includes majority of Hindu population while Muslims and Christians are minority and very few in numbers.

== Temples ==
- The Ashtabhuji Temple of the town (historically a Shiva temple) is considered to be one of the great Shaktipeethas of Goddess Durga with a rare life sized idol of Goddess Ashtabhuji and which is in good condition.

== Transport ==
The town is well connected at a distance of 10 km south-east from Sakti railway station of Howrah–Nagpur–Mumbai line and 10 km south-west from Kharsiya railway station in the same railway line and 10 km from National Highway 200 at Sakti. Nearest domestic airport is Raipur airport at a distance of 200 km.
