= Ashtabhuji Temple =

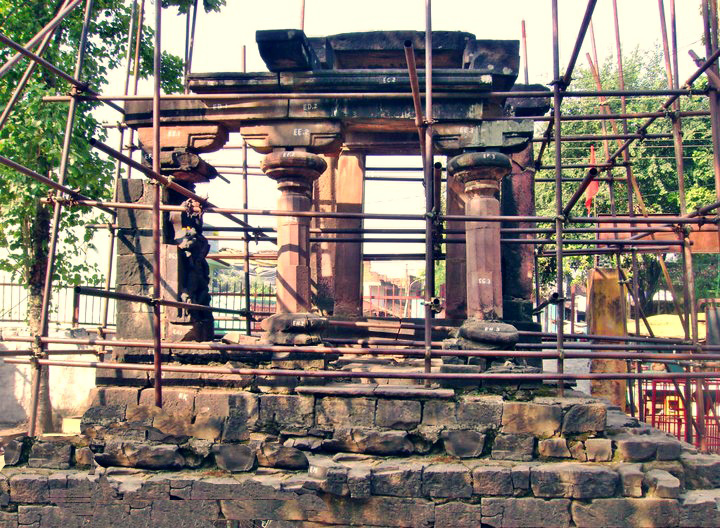

- Location in Chhattisgarh, India

Religion
- Affiliation: Hinduism
- District: Janjgir-Champa district
- Deity: Goddess Ashtabhuji (Saraswati and Durga)
- Festival: Navratri

Location
- Location: Adbhar
- State: Chhattisgarh
- Country: India
- Interactive map of Ashtabhuji Temple
- Coordinates: 21.951415°N 83.02549°E

Architecture
- Type: Hindu Shaiva temple architecture (Nagara Style)
- Creator: Gupta dynasty
- Completed: Gupta Empire, renovated by Archaeological Survey of India

Specifications
- Temple: 1
- Monument: several
- Inscriptions: tough Nagari languages and Sanskrit
- Elevation: 245 m (804 ft)

Ashtabhuji Temple is a Hindu Shaivist temple located in Adbhar, Janjgir-Champa district, Chhattisgarh, India.
