= Dakshina Kosala =

Historical region in central India

Dakṣiṇa Kosala
- Dakshina Kosala, c. 375 CE.
- Capital: Bhadravati; Sirpur; Tummana; Ratnapura
- Today part of: Madhya Pradesh, Chhattisgarh, western Odisha, part of Maharashtra

Dakshina Kosala (IAST: Dakṣiṇa Kosala, "southern Kosala") is a historical region of central India. It was located in what is now Madhya Pradesh and Chhattisgarh along with some parts of the Sambalpur region in present-day Western Odisha. At its greatest extent, it may have also included a part of the Vidarbha region in present-day Maharashtra.

Its capitals at various times included Bhadravati, Sirpur (ancient Shripura), Tuman (ancient Tummana), and Ratanpur (ancient Ratnapura).

== Extent ==
Dakshina Kosala ("South Kosala"), sometimes simply called Kosala, is hard to distinguish from Uttara Kosala ("North Kosala") in present-day Uttar Pradesh.

Epigraphic evidence suggests that the area bounded by the Shahdol, Raipur, Bilaspur, Anuppur Sambalpur districts was definitely a part of the Dakshina Kosala region. The inscriptions found in these districts record grants of villages located in the Kosala country, and the rulers mentioned in these inscriptions are given the titles indicating their lordship over Dakshina Kosala (such as Kosaladhisha, Kosaladhipati, and Kosala-narendra).

According to the 7th century Chinese traveler Xuanzang, the extent of the contemporary Kosala kingdom was 6,000 li in circuit, that is, around 81,000 square miles in area. This suggests that in the 7th century, the Dakshina Kosala region encompassed an area much larger than the region bounded by the above-mentioned districts. The Somavamshi inscriptions suggest that other areas of present-day Odisha, bordering Sambalpur, were also part of the Dakshina Kosala. During Xuanzang's period, Kosala appears to have extended from 78th meridian east to the 85th meridian east in the east–west direction.

The northern boundary of Kosala was located a little to the south of Amarakantaka, which was a part of the Mekala kingdom. The Puranas, including the Vayu Purana and the Matsya Purana, mention Mekala and Kosala as distinct regions. The ancient epigraphs, such as the Balaghat inscription of the Vakataka king Prithvishena II, also distinguish between these two regions. However, at one place, the Vayu Purana mentions the Mekalas as one of the Pancha Kosalas ("Five Kosalas"), which suggests that at some point, the chiefs of the Mekala region were subordinate to the rulers of the Kosala proper.

In the south, the Dakshina Kosala region, at its greatest extent, appears to have included a part of present-day Vidarbha region of Maharashtra. The legend of king Nala states that he reached the capital of Kosala: the description of the route of his march suggests that this capital was present-day Bhadravati.

In the 19th century Alexander Cunningham, the founder of Archaeological Survey of India, mentioned Dakshina Kosala as a synonym of Mahakoshal (or Maha-Kosala), without mentioning any source for this claim. However, none of the ancient texts or inscriptions support the claim that Dakshina Kosala and Mahakoshal refer to the same geographical unit. The ancient Sanskrit texts frequently mention Dakshina Kosala, but do not mention Mahakoshal as the name of a region.

In ancient times Dakshina Kosala (South Kosala) comprised modern Chhattisgarh and the adjoining territory in the State of Orissa up to the boundary of the Katak District. In the Puranas this country is mentioned with Traipura (the tract around Tripuri near Jabalpur), Kalinga (part of the state of Orissa) and Mekala (the region near the source of the Narmada).

=== Capitals ===
Besides Bhadravati, the other capitals of Dakshina Kosala at various times included Sirpur (ancient Shripura), Tuman (ancient Tummana), and Ratanpur (ancient Ratnapura). Bhadravati may have been the capital of Dakshina Kosala as late as during Xuanzang's time, although Sirpur is another candidate for the contemporary capital of the region.

The 601 CE Arang inscription of king Bhimasena II suggests that Shripura was the capital of the local Rishitulyakula kings, possibly since the 5th century. In the subsequent period, it served as the capital of the Panduvamshi kings, who are described as the lords of Kosala in their inscriptions.

Tummana and Ratnapura became the capitals of Dakshina Kosala centuries later. Tummana was founded by Kalingaraja, a descendant of the Tripuri Kalachuri king Kokalla I (c. 875 CE). Ratnapura was established by Ratnadeva, a later descendant of Kalingaraja and a king of the Ratnapura Kalachuri dynasty.

== Legends ==
In ancient Indian literature as well as the epic Ramayana, Mahabharata & Puranas there are many references to the ancient Kosala Kingdom of northern India. Surya Vanshi Ikshvaku dynasty kings ruled Kosala with Ayodhya as their capital. Sri Ramachandra was a king of that clan, based on whose character and activities, the Ramayana was written. This work mentions that after Rama, the kingdom was divided among his two sons, Lava and Kusha. North Kosala went to Lava as his share with Shravasti Nagari as his capital while Kusha received South Kosala. He established his new capital, Kushasthalipura on the river Kushavrate near the Vindhya mountain range, which divides north and south India. Kushasthalipura is identified as near Malhar in the present-day Bilaspur district of Chhattisgarh state.

As part of his military campaigns, Sahadeva targeted the kingdoms in the regions south of the Indo-Gangetic Plain. Vanquishing the invincible Bhismaka, Sahadeva then defeated the king of Kosala in battle and the ruler of the territories lying on the banks of the Venwa, as well as the Kantarakas and the kings of the eastern Kosalas.

== History ==
In the first century BC, Mahameghavahana, a king of Chedi conquered Kosala. It was conquered by Gautamiputra Satakarni of Satavahana dynasty in the early part of the 2nd century AD and remained a part of the Satavahana kingdom until the second half of the second century AD. During the second and third centuries AD the Megha dynasty or Meghavahanas regained their suzerainty over South Kosala. Samudragupta during his daksinapatha expedition, defeated Mahendra of Kosala who probably belonged to the Megha dynasty. As a result, South Kosala during the fourth century AD, came under the overlordship of the Gupta Empire.

After the fall of the imperial Guptas, the Dakshina Kosala region was ruled by a number of small dynasties, including the Rajarsitulyakula, Panduvamshis of Mekala (Pāṇḍavas of Mekala), the Panduvamshis of Dakshina Kosala (Pāṇḍuvaṃśīs of Śripura), and the Sharabhapuriyas. The chronology of these dynasties not very clear, because their inscriptions are dated in regnal years instead of a calendar era. The only ancient inscription found in this region that appears to be dated in a calendar era is the Arang copper-plate inscription of Bhimasena II of Sura family. However, it is not connected to any other records from the area, and therefore, is not much useful for reconstructing the region's chronology.

The Pāṇḍavas of Mekala are known from two Malhar inscriptions issued by king Śūrabala, the last member of the dynasty. The king claimed descent from the legendary hero Pāṇḍu of the lunar dynasty (somavaṃśa).

The Amarāryakulas (Amarārya family) are known from the Malhar inscription of Vyaghraraja. D. C. Sircar believes this family to be same as the Sharabhapuriyas, Ajaya Mitra Shastri believes it to an independent dynasty, while Hans T. Bakker believes it to be a vassal of the Sharabhapuriyas.

The Sharabhapuriyas initially ruled as Gupta vassals, and may have fought with the Nalas of Pushkari. They laid foundation of the distinct Dakshina Kosala style of art and architecture.

The Panduvamshis of Dakshina Kosala seem to have been related to the Panduvamshis of Mekala, and initially served as feudatories to the Sharabhapuriyas. The early kings of the dynasty were Vaishnavites, but its last known king Mahāśivagupta Bālārjuna called himself a devotee of Shiva (parama-māheśvara), and also patronized the Buddhists. The Chinese traveler Xuanzang visited the region during his reign, and described his kingdom ("Kiao-sa-lo" or Kosala) as follows:

The capital is about 40 li round; the soil is rich and fertile, and yields abundant crops. [...] The population is very dense. The men are tall and black complexioned. The disposition of the people is hard and violent; they are brave and impetuous. There are both heretics and believers here. They are earnest in study and of a high intelligence. The king is of the Kshattriya race; he greatly honours the law of Buddha, and his virtue and love are far renowned. There are about one hundred saṅghārāmas, and somewhat less than 10,000 priests; they all alike study the teaching of the Great Vehicle. There are about seventy Deva temples, frequented by heretics of different persuasions. Not far to the south of the city is an old saṅghārāma, by the side of which is a stūpa that was built by Aśoka-rāja.

The Panduvamshis of Dakshina Kosala may have been related to the later Somavamshi dynasty, who ruled in present-day Odisha.

== See also ==
- Kingdoms of Ancient India
