= Baloda =

- Town
- Location in Chhattisgarh, India Baloda (India)
- Coordinates: 22.15°N 82.48°E
- Country: India
- State: Chhattisgarh
- District: Janjgir-Champa
- Elevation: 280 m (920 ft)

Population (2001)
  - Total: 11,331

Languages
  - Official: Hindi, Chhattisgarhi
- Time zone: UTC+5:30 (IST)
- Vehicle registration: CG

Baloda is a town and a nagar panchayat in Janjgir-Champa district in the Indian state of Chhattisgarh.

== Geography ==
Baloda is located at Baloda of Janjgir District 22.15°N 82.48°E. It has an average elevation of 280 metres (918 feet).

== Demographics ==
As of 2001 India census, Baloda had a population of 13,630. Males constitute 51% of the population and females 49%. Baloda has an average literacy rate of 66%, higher than the national average of 59.5%; with 59% of the males and 41% of females literate. 14% of the population is under 6 years of age.
