= Malhar, Chhattisgarh =

Town in Chhattisgarh, India

Coordinates: 21°53′38″N 82°17′6″E

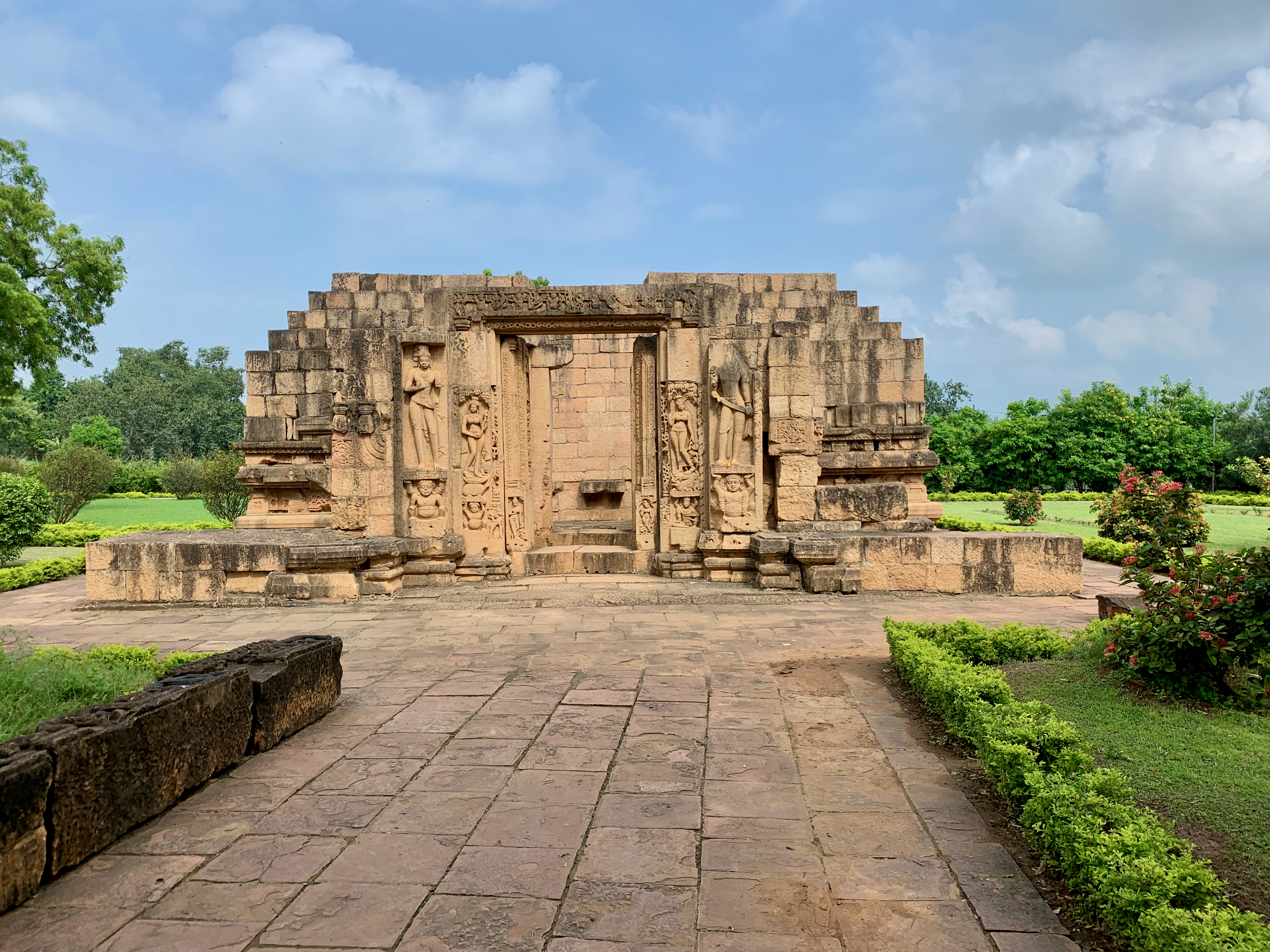
The Bhima Kichak Temple in Malhar, Bilaspur district. It is dated to c. 6th–7th century CE

Malhar is a small town situated in Bilaspur district of Chhattisgarh, India. A historically important site that once was a major city and served as a capital in the 1st millennium, it has been referred to as Mallar, Mallari and Sarabhapur in inscriptions and Indian literature. In contemporary times, it is more village like with mounds and ruins of an ancient fort, two restored Shiva temples and a museum with the ruins of major group of Hindu, Jain and Buddhist temples. It has archaeological significance. It is about 30 kilometers southeast from Bilaspur in a rural terrain, connected with a feeder road from India's National Highway 49.

== Oldest Vishnu ==
A four-armed sculpture, locally recalled as Chaturbhuji Bhagavan and commonly identified by scholars as an early representation of Vishnu based on its attributes of holding a shankha (conch), chakra (discus), and gada (mace), dated to c. 200 BCE by a Brahmi inscription in Prakrit, was found in Malhar. The inscription records that the image was consecrated by Bhāradāsa (or Bharadvaja), wife of Puṇadatta (or Parnadatta), son of Kosiki, but does not explicitly name the deity. It was documented by the Archaeological Survey of India in 1960-61 as part of explorations revealing sculptures from the 2nd century BCE to the 12th century CE. It is considered one of the earliest potential representations of Vishnu in Indian sculpture.

== Legends ==
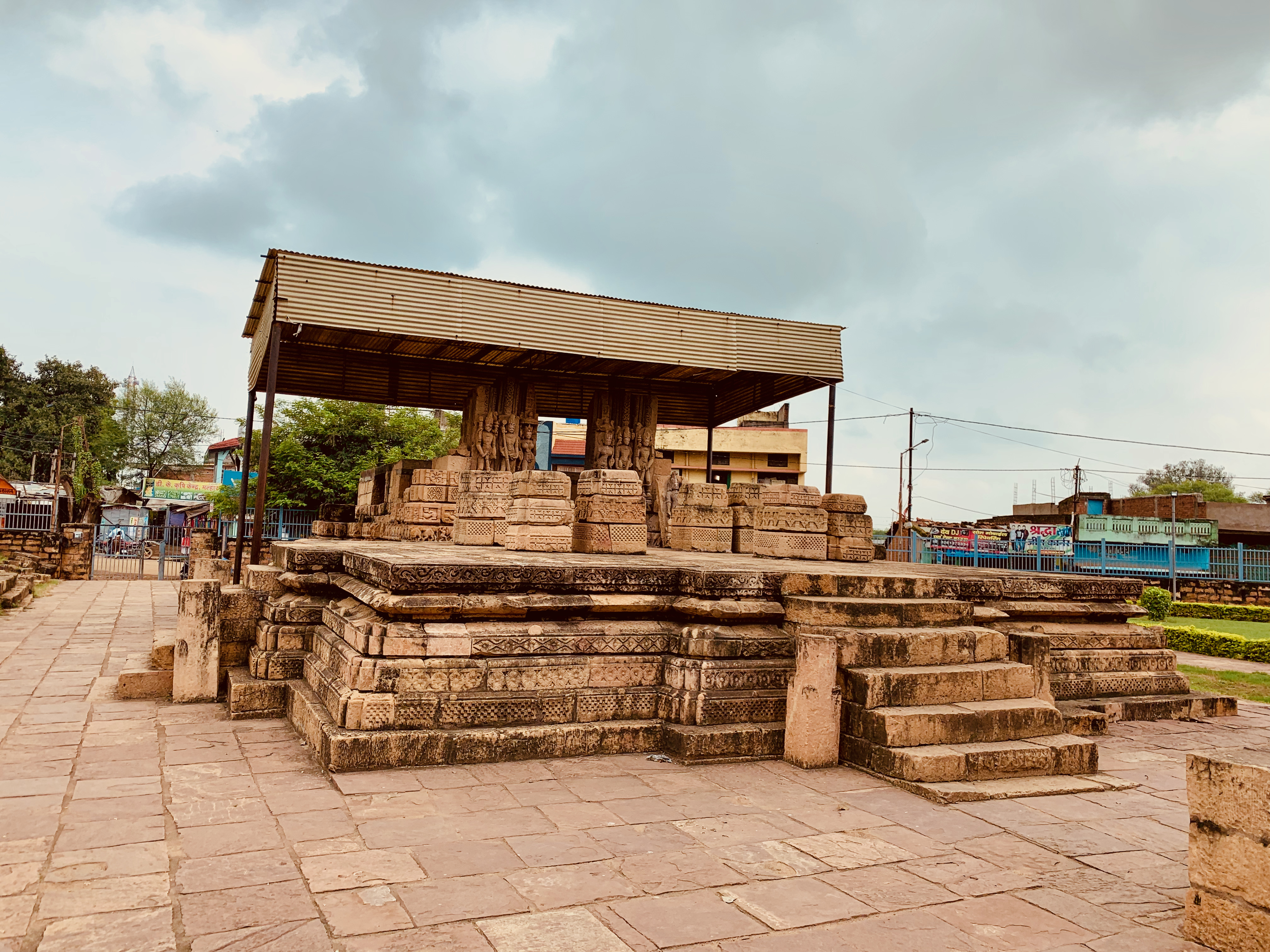
The 12th century Pataleshvara Temple in Malhar

In ancient Indian literature as well as the epic Ramayana, Mahabharata and Puranas there are many references to the ancient Kosala Kingdom of northern India. Surya Vanshi Ikshvaku dynasty kings ruled Kosala with Ayodhya as their capital. Sri Ramachandra was a king of that clan, based on whose character and activities, the Ramayana was written. This work mentions that after Rama, the kingdom was divided among his two sons, Lava and Kusha. North Kosala went to Lava as his share with Shravasti Nagari as his capital while Kusha received South Kosala. He established his new capital, Kushasthalipura on the river Kushavrate near the Vindhya mountain range, which divides north and south India. Kushasthalipura is identified as near Malhar in the present-day Bilaspur district of Chhattisgarh state.

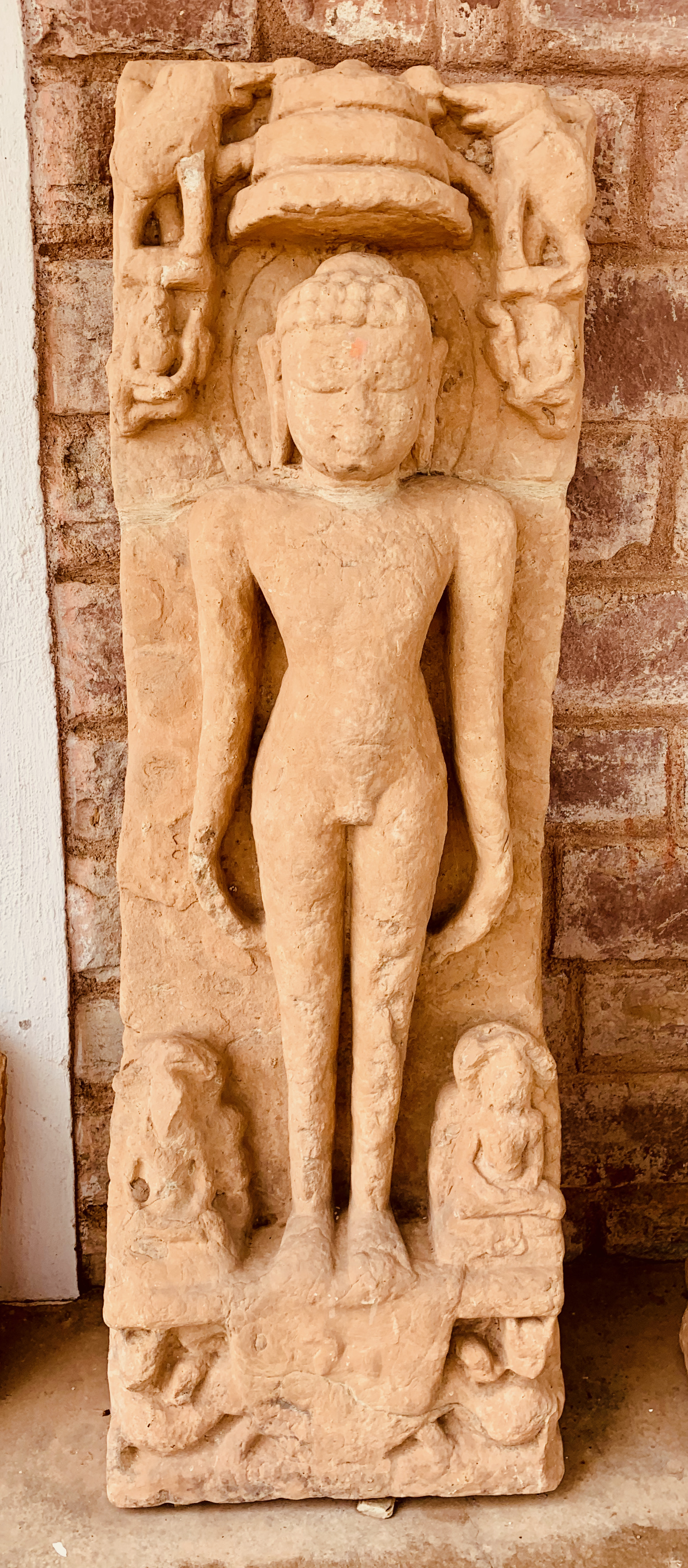
Ruins of Tirthankara, head restored, Malhar Chhattisgarh India - 20

As part of his military campaigns, Sahadeva targeted the kingdoms in the regions south of the Indo-Gangetic Plain. Vanquishing the invincible Bhismaka, Sahadeva then defeated the king of Kosala in battle and the ruler of the territories lying on the banks of the Venwa, as well as the Kantarakas and the kings of the eastern Kosalas.

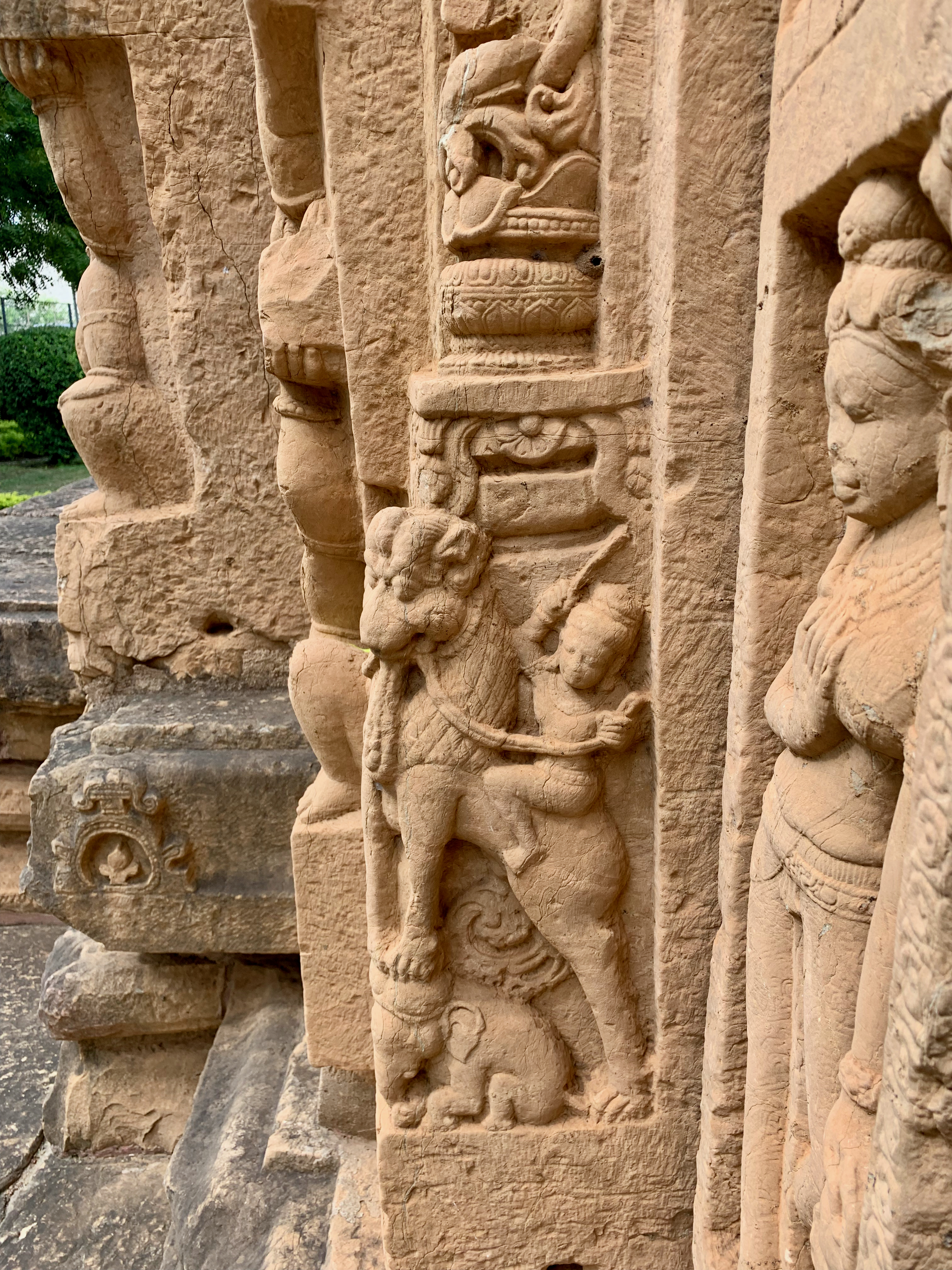
6th 7th century Bhima Kichak Temple, Malhar Chhattisgarh India - 31

== Archaeological Sites ==
In Malhar, many ancient temples have been found, such as the Pataleshwar temple, the Devri temple & the Dindeshwari temple. Ancient deposits and Jain memorials were also found here. The four handed idol of Vishnu is significant. The remains found here are of the period from approximately 1000 BCE to the Ratnapura Kalachuri regime. Temples of the 10th and 11th centuries are also conspicuous. Among them, the Pataleshwar Kedar temple is one, where the Gomukhi Shivling is the main attraction. The Dindeshwari temple of the Kalachuri regime is also significant. Artistic idols are present in the Deor temple. There is also a museum in Malhar, being managed by the Government of India, having a good collection of old sculptures.

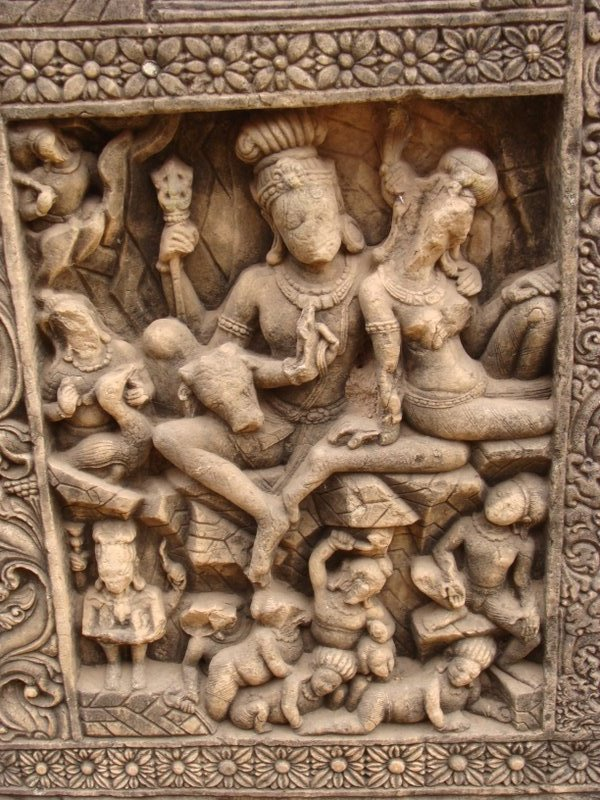
Temple Carvings in Malhar Bilaspur Chhattisgarh 2009

The excavation at Malhar found past history of many kingdoms of South Kosala:

1. Period 1 - Protohistoric (c 1000 BCE to 350 BCE)
2. Period 2 - Maurya, Shunga, Satavahana (c 350 BCE to 300 CE)
3. Period 3 - Sharabhapuriya and Somvavamshi (c 300 to 650 CE)
4. Period 4 - Later Somavamshi (c 650 to 900 CE)
5. Period 5 - Kalachuri (c 900 to 1300 CE)

Malhar is in the list of "Ancient Monuments and Archaeological Sites and Remains of National Importance" maintained by the Archaeological Survey of India.

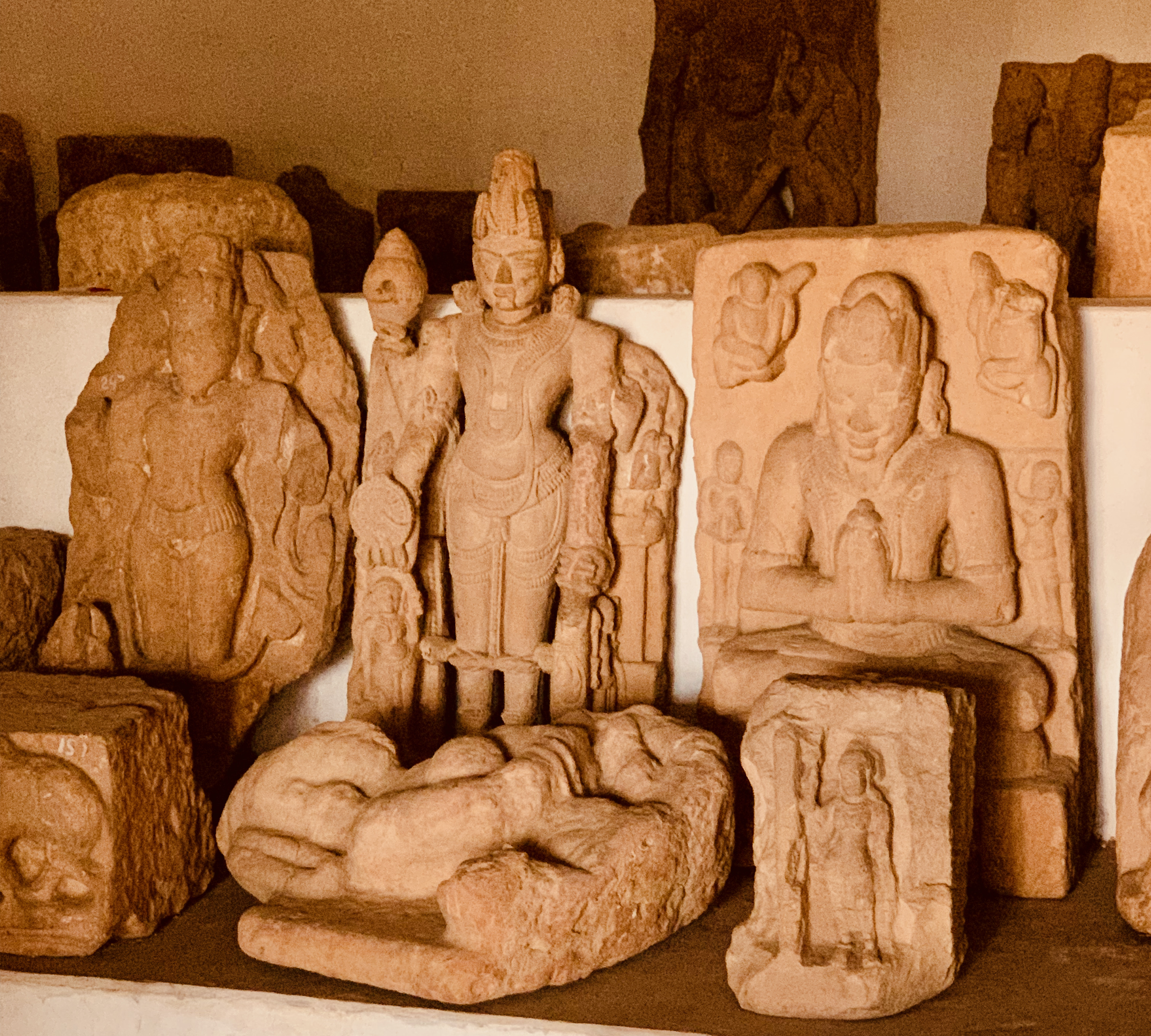
Ruins of Hindu, Jain and Buddhist monuments inside village museum, Malhar Chhattisgarh India - 17
