= Sirpur, Mahasamund =

Sirpur Sripura, Shripura
- village
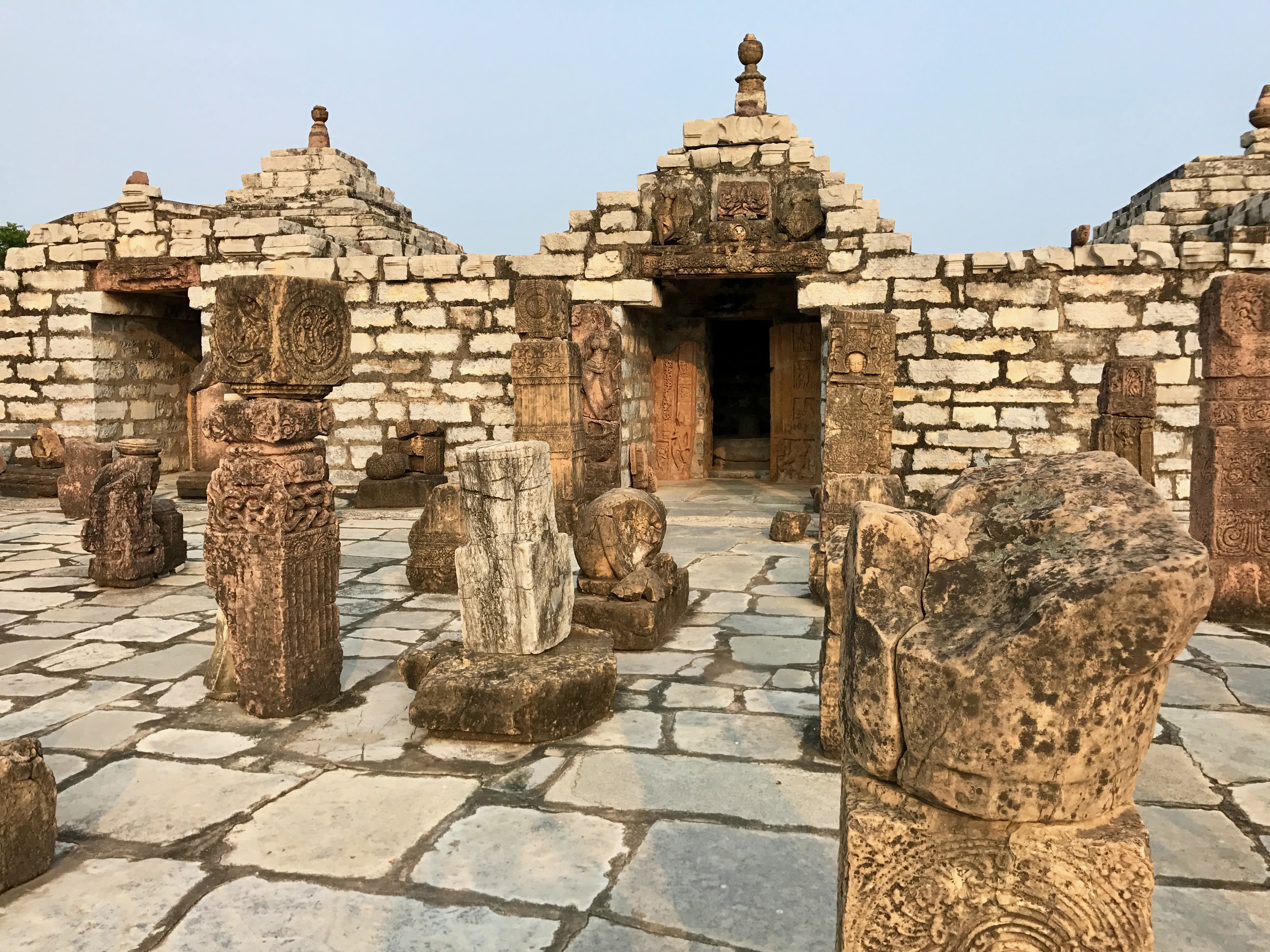
- Mandapa of Surang Tila in front of shrine

- Location in Chhattisgarh, India Sirpur (India)
- Coordinates: 21.345225°N 82.184814°E
- Country: India
- State: Chhattisgarh
- District: Mahasamund
- Tehsil: Mahasamund

Government
  - Body: Village panchayat

Population (2011)
  - Total: 1,467

Languages
  - Official: Hindi, Chhattisgarhi
- Time zone: UTC+5:30 (IST)
- Postal code: 493445
- Vehicle registration: CG 06

Sirpur is a village in Mahasamund district in the state of Chhattisgarh, 35 km from Mahasamund city and 78 km away from Raipur on the banks of the river Mahanadi.

Sirpur was the capital of the Panduvanshi dynasty in ancient times. The village hosts the Sirpur Group of Monuments consisting of Buddhist, Hindu and Jain temples and monasteries. These are dated from the 5th to the 12th century.

== History ==
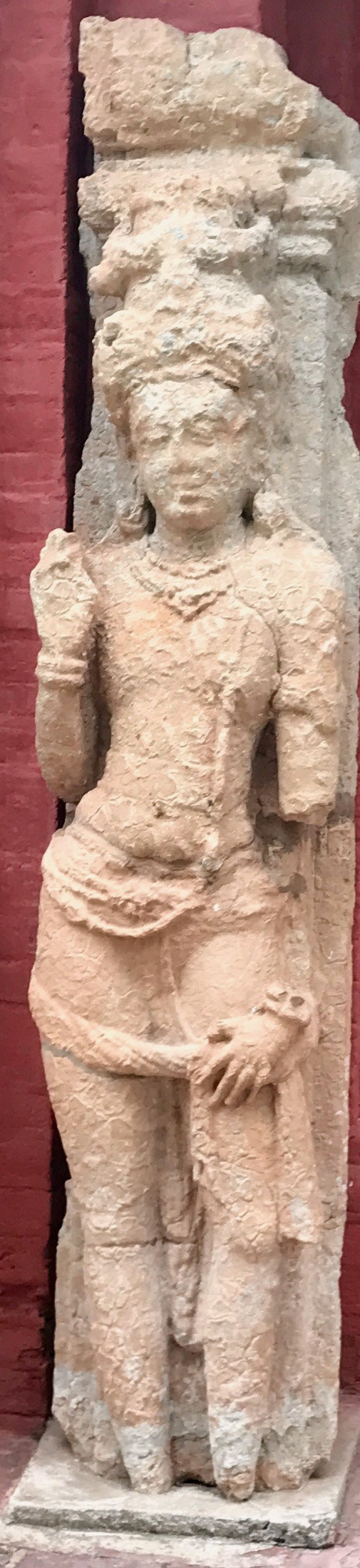
An 8th to 9th century artwork from a Hindu temple in Sirpur.

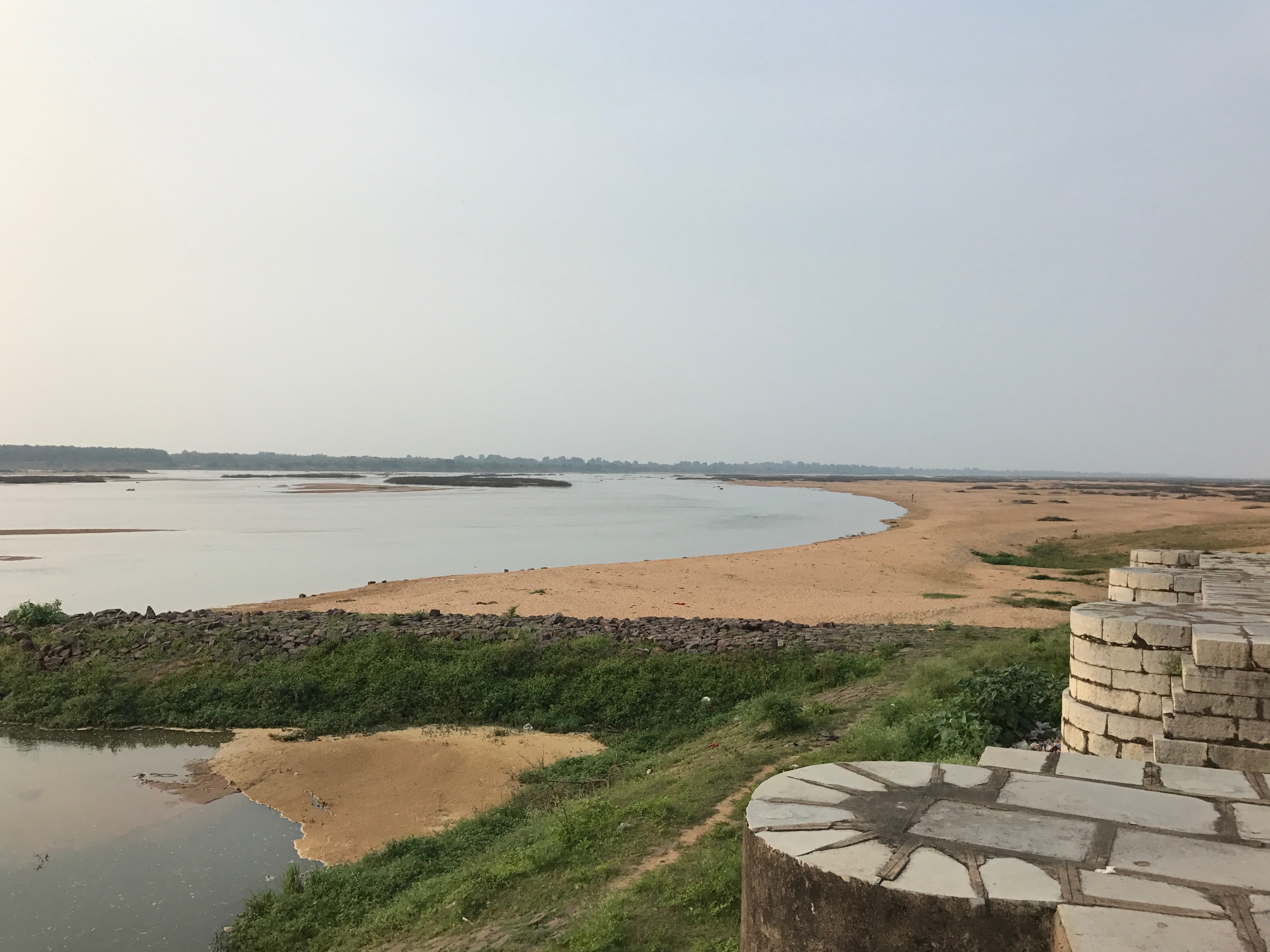
A view of river Mahanadi from a Shiva temple in Sirpur.

Sirpur, also referred to as Shripur, Sripura or Sripur (literally, "city of auspiciousness, abundance, Lakshmi") in ancient Indian texts and inscriptions, is a major archaeological site along the Mahanadi River. Sirpur was capital of Panduvanshi dynasty in ancient times.

The site has been significant for its temple ruins of Rama and Lakshmana of the Ramayana fame, as well as those related to Shaivism, Shaktism, Buddhism and Jainism. The site excavations after 1950, particularly after 2003, have yielded 22 Shiva temples, 5 Vishnu temples, 10 Buddha Viharas, 3 Jain Viharas, a 6th/7th century market and snana-kund (bath house). The site shows extensive syncretism, where Buddhist and Jain statues or motifs intermingle with Shiva, Vishnu and Devi temples.

The location is mentioned in the memoirs of the Chinese traveler Xuanzang as a location of monasteries and temples. It was visited in 1872 by Alexander Cunningham, a colonial British India official. His report on a Laxman (Lakshmana) temple at Sirpur brought it to international attention.

== Culture ==
Sirpur is a pilgrimage site for the followers of Jainism, Buddhism and Hinduism. It hosts a major fair (mela) during the Mahashiv Ratri.The fair is a prominent example of the region's spiritual and cultural traditions.

== Transport ==
Sirpur is accessible from Raipur by a four-lane National Highway 53. Regular bus services connect Raipur and Sirpur.

The nearest railway station is Mahasamund railway station (35 km).

The nearest airport is the Swami Vivekananda airport at Raipur (IATA: RPR), with daily flights to major cities in India.

== Places of interest ==
- Sirpur Group of Monuments
- Barnawapara, a nearby wildlife sanctuary set midst a hilly terrain and dense forests. The Indian bison gaur, cheetal, sambhar, neelgai and wild boar are found in this sanctuary.

== See also ==
- Sirpur Group of Monuments
