= Dipka =

- Census town
- Nickname: Gevra
- Location in Chhattisgarh, India Dipka (India)
- Coordinates: 22.35238°N 82.55476°E
- Country: India
- State: Chhattisgarh
- District: Korba

Government
  - Body: Municipal Council, Dipka
  - President: Rajendra Singh Rajput (BJP)

Population (2001)
  - Total: 20,182

Languages
  - Official: Hindi, Chhattisgarhi
- Time zone: UTC+5:30 (IST)
- PIN: 495452
- Vehicle registration: CG-12

Dipka is a census town in Korba District in the state of Chhattisgarh, India. It is known for its Gevra and Dipka Open cast coal mines.

== History ==
Dipka (earlier known as Junnadih) was a Gram Panchayat with very few population mostly part was covered by forest. With the expansion of Gevra Coal mine, South Eastern Coalfields Limited built residential colonies for their employees in the region which lead to conversion of village into a town and Gram Panchayat to Municipal Council.

== Municipal Council, Dipka ==
Municipal Council, Dipka came into existence in 2004 with 21 wards.

Year	President	Party
2004	Bugal Dubey	Bharatiya Janata Party
2009	Manoj Sharma	Bharatiya Janata Party
2014	Bugal Dubey	Bharatiya Janata Party
2019	Santoshi Diwan	Indian National Congress
2024	Rajendra Singh Rajput	Bharatiya Janata Party

== Location ==
Dipka lies approximately 20 kilometres west of Korba City. It is surrounded by Pali and Katghora (both lies in NH-130) and other rural areas of Hardi Bazar, Ratija and has connectivity to Janjgir-Champa district towards south direction.

== Demographics ==
As of 2001 India census, Dipka had a population of 20,182. Males constitute 53% of the population and females 47%. Dipka has an average literacy rate of 73%, higher than the national average of 59.5%: male literacy is 79% and, female literacy is 67%. In Dipka, 17% of the population is under 6 years of age.

== Education ==
There are various educational institutions in Dipka such as:

=== Schools ===
- DAV Public School, Gevra, Urja Nagar, Dipka
- Beacon English School, Shakti Nagar, Dipka
- Indus Public School, Batari, Dipka
- St. Thomas Public School, Pragati Nagar, Dipka
- Saraswati Shishu Mandir, Gevra Project, Dipka
- East point English medium high school, Santi Nagar, Dipka

=== College ===
- Government College, Dipka
- Param Mitra Industrial Training Institute, Dipka

== Industries ==
Dipka houses Gevra and Dipka open cast coal mines which is part of Korba Coalfield of South Eastern Coalfields Limited. There is also various other industries such as Power generation companies owned by ACB (India) Group and other coal beneficiaries.
