= Chaiturgarh =

Fort in Korba district, Chhattisgarh, India

Chaiturgarh fort
- Lafagarh
- Part of Chhattisgarh Forts
- Korba district, Chhattisgarh
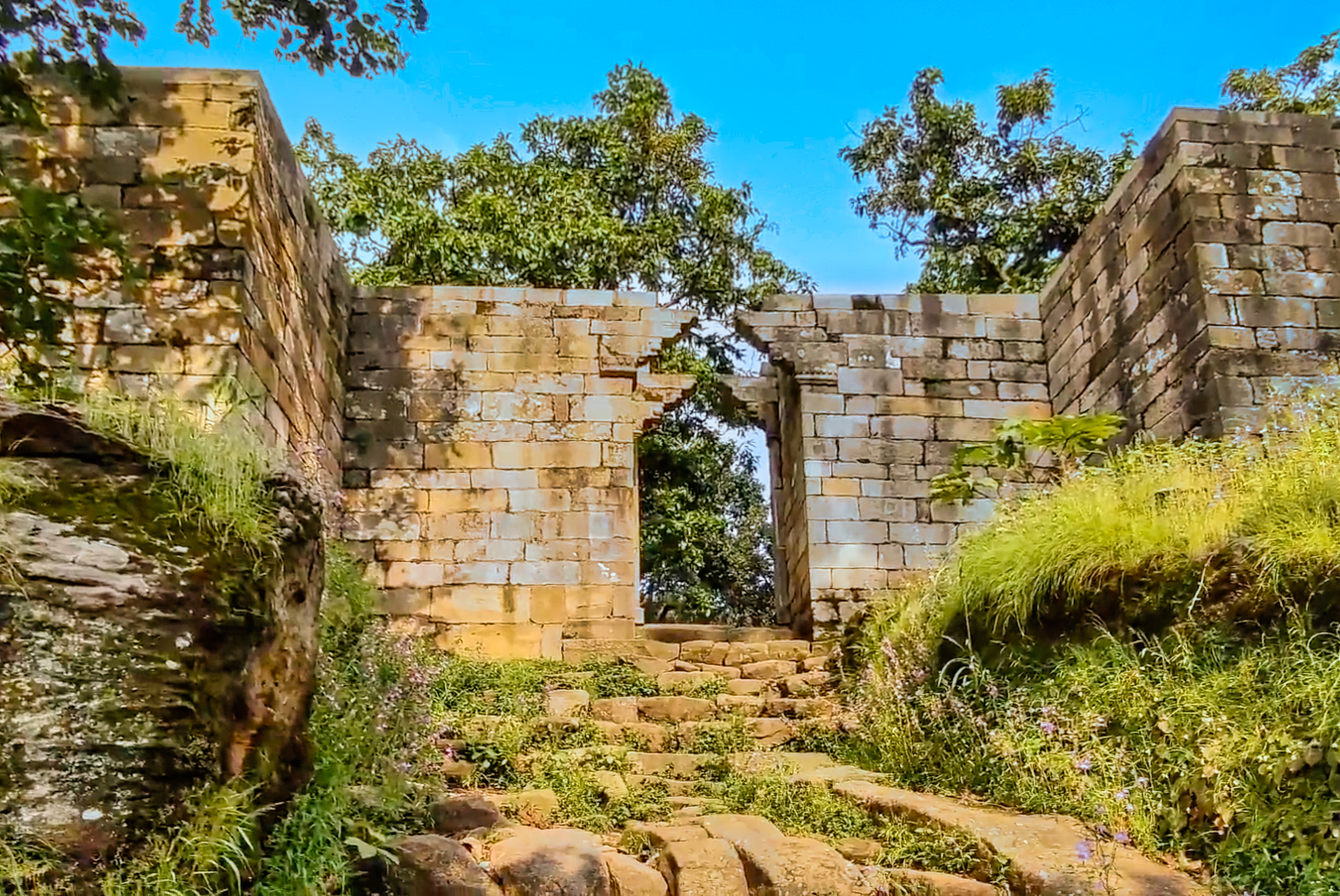
- Singh Dwar, Chaiturgarh Fort

Site information
- Type: Hill fort / natural fortification
- Owner: Central Archeological Department of India
- Condition: Protected ruins

Location
- Location of Chaiturgarh in India
- Location within Chhattisgarh
- Coordinates: 22.5103°N 82.2714°E
- Height: 3,060 feet (930 m)

Site history
- Built: 10th century CE
- Built by: Raja Prithvideva I
- In use: Temple and tourism

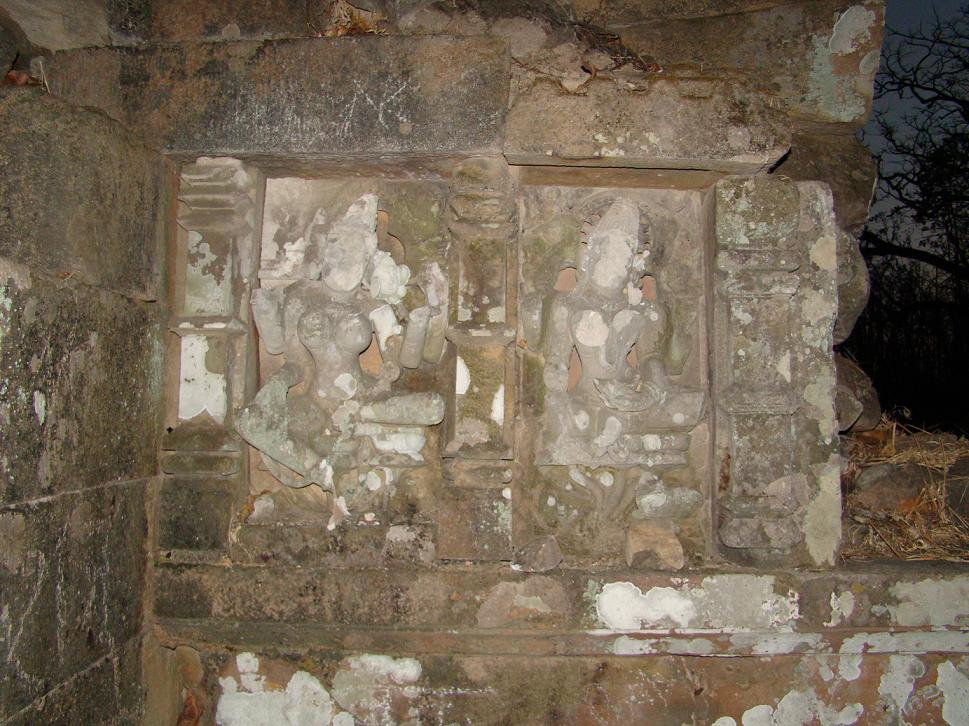

Chaiturgarh or Lafagarh is a fort about 51 kilometres (32 mi) from Katghora tehsil, Korba district, Chhattisgarh, India, on the Korba–Bilaspur road. It is an Archaeological Survey of India protected monument. Chaiturgarh is one of the 36 forts of Chhattisgarh. Chaithurgarh is situated around 70 kilometres (43 mi) from Korba and 21 kilometres (13 mi) from Pali town. It is situated at an elevation of over 3,060 feet (934 meters) above sea level, in the Satpura Range and forms part of the Achanakmar-Amarkantak Biosphere Reserve. Known for its natural defenses and panoramic views, Chaiturgarh combines historical significance with ecological importance.

The fort was likely developed in its recognizable form during the 10th century CE under the Kalachuri dynasty, although the site shows signs of earlier occupation. With formidable cliffs on all sides, Chaiturgarh is often described as a "natural fort", relying on its geographic location more than constructed defenses. The fort is also home to several temples, caves, and man-made ponds, and it has long been a pilgrimage destination for worshipers of Mahishasur Mardini. In recent years, the fort has attracted archaeological interest and ecotourism initiatives but remains relatively under-researched compared to better-known Indian forts.

== Location ==
Chaiturgarh (also known as Lafagarh) is situated at a height of 3,060 feet (930 m) on a hilltop. It is protected by strong natural walls and is considered as one of the strongest natural forts. Since it is protected by strong natural walls, only at some places walls have been built. The fort has three main entrances which are named as Menaka, Humkara, and Simhadwar.

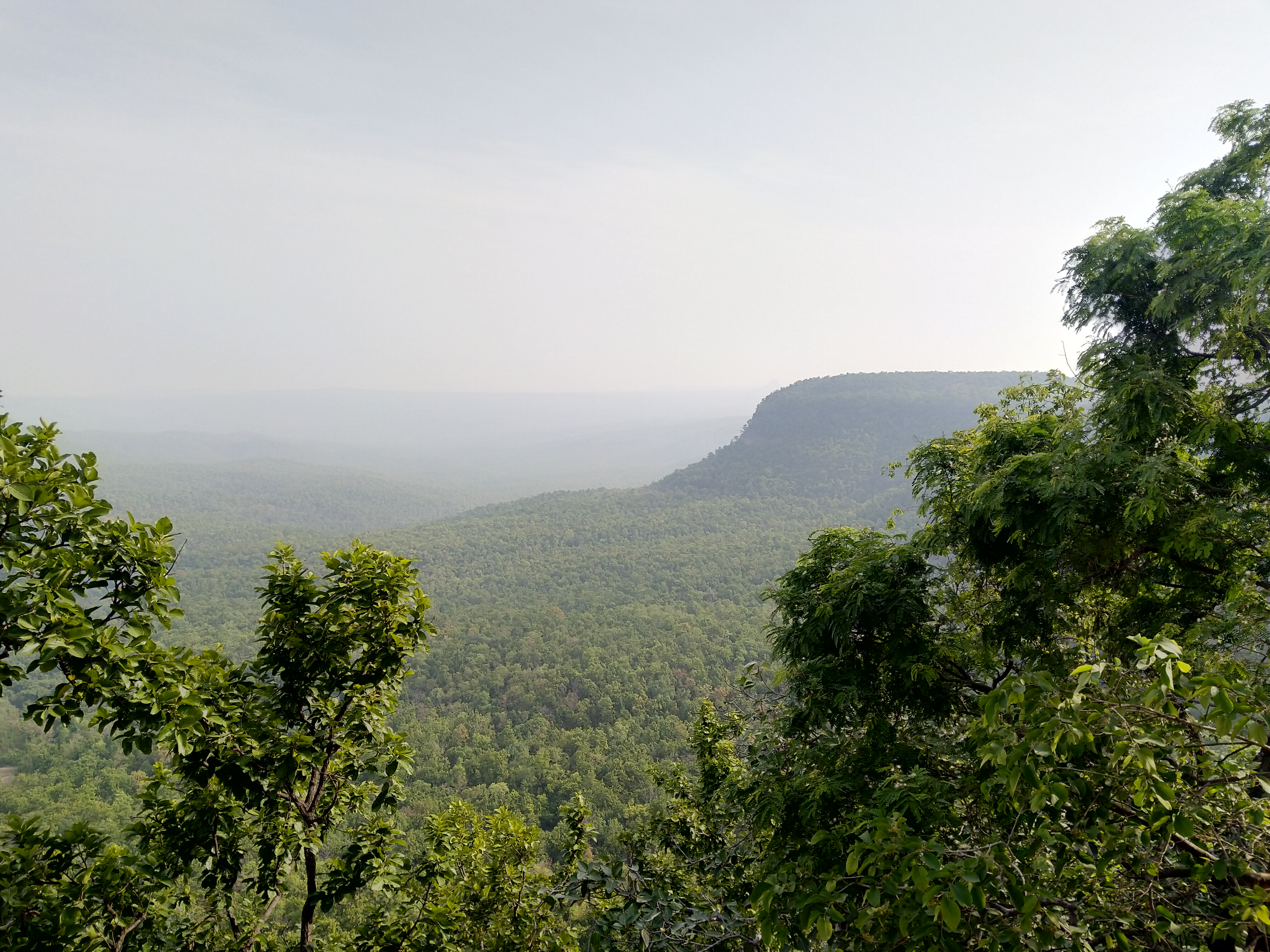
Flora of Chaiturgarh forest hills Korba, Chhattisgarh

== Architecture ==
The Mahishasur Mardini temple is situated here. The idol of Mahishasur Mardini having 12 hands is installed in the sanctum sanctorum. Shankar cave is situated 3 kilometres (1.9 mi) away from the temple. The cave which is like a tunnel, is 25 feet (7.6 m) long. One can go inside the cave only by creeping since it is very small in diameter.

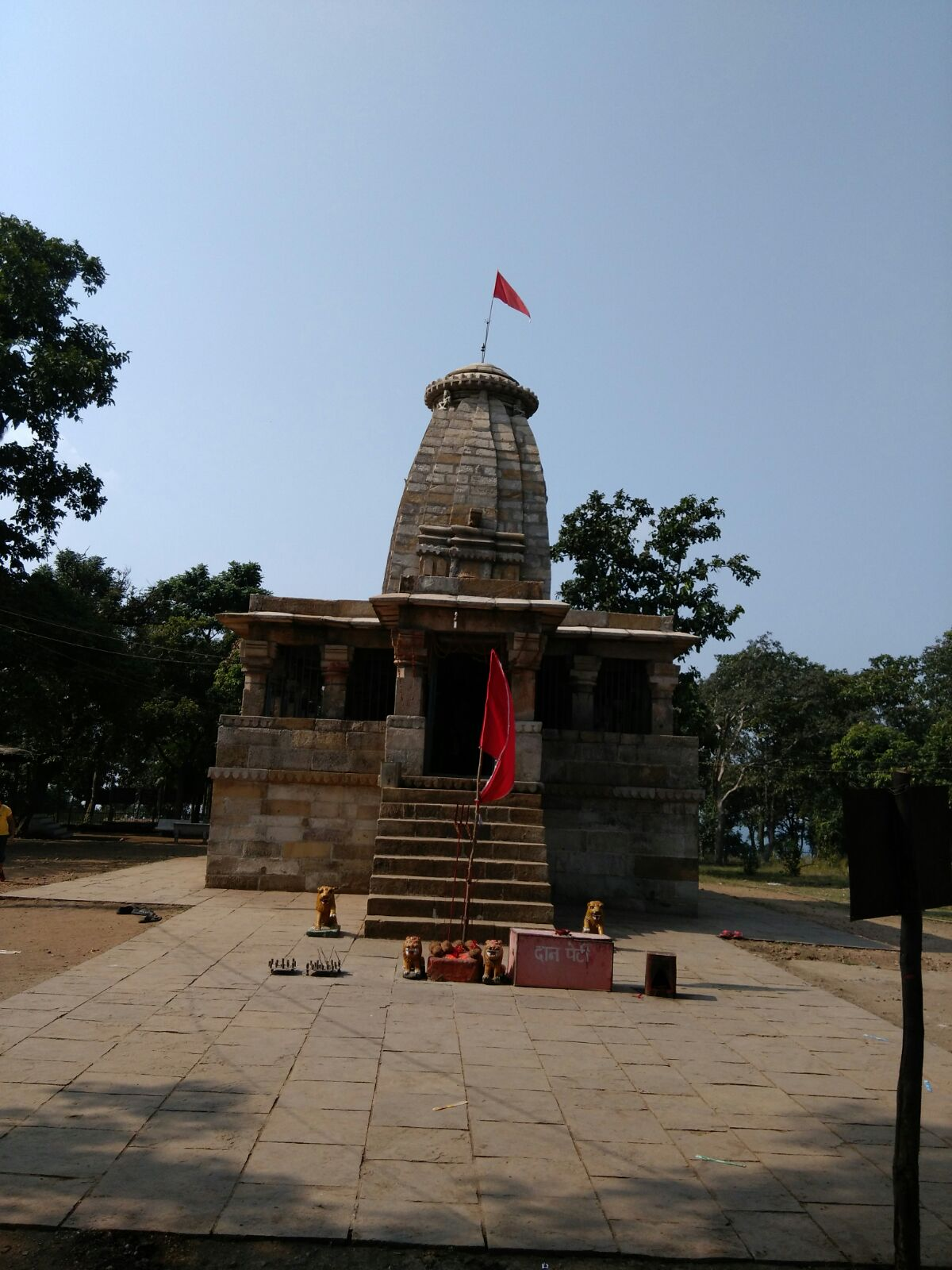

== History ==
Archeologists consider it as one of the strongest natural forts. A Descriptive List of Inscriptions in the Central Province and Berar – dated in Kalchuri Era 933 (1181-82 CE) gives a long genealogical list of the Kalchuri kings. It mentions that there was a king in the family of the Haihaya who has eighteen sons. One of them was Kalinga whose son Kamala ruled over Tummana. Kamala was succeeded by Ratnaraja I and later by Prithvideva I. Mughal emperor Akbar captured the fort in 1571 and Mughals ruled until 1628 CE. Chaiturgarh was constructed by Raja Prithvideva I.

The name "Chaiturgarh" is believed to derive from the ancient city of "Chaturgarh," meaning "the fort of four directions," likely referencing its strategic vantage point. Local legends also refer to the fort as "Lafa" or "Lafagarh," after the Lafas tribal communities, who are historically associated with the area. Some oral traditions suggest that the site had earlier significance in tribal or protohistoric times, although no conclusive archaeological evidence has yet been unearthed to confirm pre-Kalachuri occupation. During the medieval period, the fort changed hands between local rulers, and by the early modern era, it had largely lost military relevance. However, its temples and religious associations ensured its continuous importance in local culture. British-era surveys of the region, notably by colonial explorers such as Joseph David Beglar in the 1870s, included descriptions of Chaiturgarh and its temples, although detailed excavation never took place. Beglar recorded that parts of the fort may have been briefly occupied during the 1857 Rebellion, and remarked on the absence of significant habitation within the plateau.

Lately, the fort lack maintenance and got encroached.

== Architecture ==
One of Chaiturgarh's most remarkable features is its natural architecture. The fort is situated atop a high plateau that spans approximately 5 square kilometers. Unlike conventional forts with massive constructed ramparts, Chaiturgarh uses its surrounding cliffs sheer drops of 200–300 feet on all sides as a natural barrier. There are only a few narrow passes leading up to the plateau, making the site extremely defensible even without heavy fortification. At least three gates, Jhandi (or Dinda), Manka Dai, and Hukra were described, each incorporating colonnaded halls and religious sculptures, many dedicated to Shaivite and Shakta deities. He also described a temple near the Singh Dwar, enshrining a statue of Durga slaying Mahishasura, and referenced inscriptions reportedly discovered there, though untraceable during his visit. His observations remain one of the earliest systematic surveys of the site.
