= Korba Coalfield =

Coalfield in Chhattisgarh, India

- Location in India
- Location: Chhattisgarh, India; 22°20′30″N 82°34′4″E
- Company: South Eastern Coalfields Limited
- Website: http://secl.gov.in/
- Acquired: 1985

Korba Coalfield is located in Korba district in the Indian state of Chhattisgarh in the basin of the Hasdeo River, a tributary of the Mahanadi.

== The coalfield ==
Korba Coalfield is located between latitudes 22^{0} 15^{’} N and 22^{0} 30^{’} N and longitudes 82^{0} 15^{’} E and 82^{0}55 ^{’} E. Korba Coalfield covers an area of about 530 square kilometres (200 sq mi). According to Geological Survey of India, total reserves (including proved, indicated and inferred reserves) of non-coking coal (as on 1.1.2004) in Korba Coalfield was 10,074.77 million tonnes, out of which 7,732.87 was up to a depth of 300 m and 2,341.90 million tonnes was at a depth of 300–600 m.

The coal mined at Korba coalfield generally has the following characteristics – moisture: 4.5–7.4 per cent, volatile matter: 27.9–39.2 per cent, fixed carbon: 34.1–47.7 per cent, ash content: 11.2–31.6 per cent.

== Operations ==
Though coal has been mined in Korba coalfields since 1941, large scale production could be initiated only on completion of the Champa-Korba rail link in 1955. Open cast mining activities in the Korba Coalfield are now being carried out. Korba Coalfield accounts for a major portion of coal mined by South Eastern Coalfields Limited. The 2010 production of SECL was 101.15 tonnes, out of which 73.35 tonnes came from Korba Coalfield.

Sub-areas of Korba Coalfield are: Korba, Surakachhar, Rajgamar, Manikpur, Dhelwadih, Kushumunda and Gevra. The major working coalmines are: Surakachhar, Banki, Balgi, Rajgamar, Pavan, Manikpur, Dhewadih, Singhali, Bagdeva, Kusumunda, Laxman, Gevra and Dipka.

=== Gevra Open Cast Mine ===
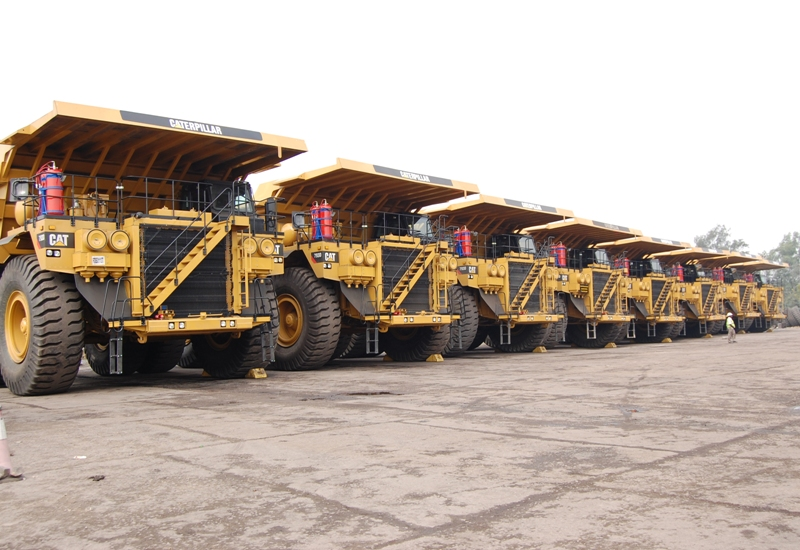
Dumpers in Gevra mine

Gevra mine is an open cast mine complex at the town of Gevra that has been described as the largest open cast mine in India and Asia, as well as the world's second-largest. As of 2011 it has a capacity of 35 million tonnes per annum. It was opened in 1981. During 1999–2000, it produced over 18 million tonnes of coal and removed 12 million m^{3}of overburden. In 2000, Gevra mine had a plan to expand from 12 million tonnes per annum to 25 million tonnes per annum. Actual production was raised from 18 million tonnes to 26 million tonnes annually in 3½ years. SECL reported that on 18 March 2007, Gevra Open Cast Mine produced 100,000 tonnes of coal, the highest quantity of coal ever produced by any mine or coalfield in India on a single day. Expansion of capacity of Gevra mine from 35 million tonnes annually to 43.75 million tonnes annually has been awaiting environmental clearance since 2009.

=== Dipka Open Cast Mine ===
Dipka Open Cast Mine has an annual capacity of 25 million tonnes.

=== Kusmunda Open Cast Mine ===
Kusmunda Open Cast Mine has an annual capacity of 50 million tonnes.

== Pollution ==
In a paper on "Assessment of impact of Coal and Minerals Related Industrial Activities in Korba Industrial Belt Through Spectroscopic Technique" by Rajesh Kumar, Gurdeep Singh and Asim Kumar Pal, the authors highlighted, "Korba Coalfield has been identified as one of the hot spots and the worst polluted area in India. There is widespread concern of air pollution due to emission of particulates from various mining and allied activities."

The main sources of pollution in the Korba area are coal-based power plants, smelter and open cast mines at Gevra, Dipka and Kusmunda. Large scale transportation of coal raises a pollution problem. Amongst steps taken or underway to check pollution in the area are: widening and repairs of roads in Gevra, Dipka and Kusmunda mines and procurement of Continuous Ambient Air Monitoring Stations at Gevra and Dipka mines.

== Coal washeries ==
There is a pronounced degree of contamination in the coal from open cast mines. Such coal often has ash content averaging 40 per cent. Moreover, with multiple sources of supply, the quality is inconsistent. Even 6–8 per cent reduction in ash improves coal quality significantly. Coal preparation, or washing as it is commonly referred to, is both economical and environmentally beneficial. Coal washeries are being established in Korba Coalfields. ACB (India) had set up a washery at Dipka in 1999, gradually upgrading capacity from 1 million tonnes per annum to 12 million tonnes per annum. The KJSL Coal Washery at Dhatura in Pali tehsil has an annual capacity of 2 million tonnes.

== Power plants ==
There are several coal-based thermal power stations in the area consuming coal from Korba Coalfield. Korba Super Thermal Power Plant of NTPC has installed capacity of 2,600 MW. It gets coal from Gevra and Kusmunda mines. Chhattisgarh State Power Generation Company Limited has three power stations in the area: Korba East Thermal Power Station has installed capacity of 440 MW, Dr. Shyama Prasad Mukherjee Thermal Power Station (Korba East) 500 MW, and Hasdeo Thermal Power Station (Korba West) 840 MW. The captive power plant of Balco has an installed capacity of 1200 MW ,(BCPP) old power plant operated by balco has now been closed.

== See also ==
- Banki Mongra
