= Hasdeo Bango Dam =

Dam in Chhattisgarh, India

Coordinates: 22.605°N 82.598°E

- Interactive map of Hasdeo Bango Dam
- Country: India
- Location: Korba, Chhattisgarh
- Purpose: Hydroelectric, Irrigation
- Status: Operational
- Construction began: 1961
- Opening date: 1962

Dam and spillways
- Impounds: Hasdeo River

Reservoir
- Total capacity: 2.89 cubic km (102.07 tmc ft)
- Catchment area: 6,730 km2

Power Station
- Type: Hydroelectric
- Installed capacity: 120 MW

Hasdeo Bango Dam is a dam constructed in 1961-62 across the Hasdeo river in Chhattisgarh, India. It is the longest, widest dam in Chhattisgarh and the first multi-purpose water project in Chhattisgarh. It is located 70 km from Korba, Korba district. It has a catchment area of 6,730 km^{2}. The dam has a large effective storage capacity of 2.89 cubic kms (102.07 tmc ft). It has the capacity to generate 120MW electricity. Hasdeo Bango Dam is constructed across Hasedo river. The river originates about 910.0 m (2,985.6 ft) above sea level, at a place about 10.0 km (6.2 mi) from Sonhat in Koriya district. The total length of the river is 333.0 km (206.9 mi),

== See also ==
- Tourism in Chhattisgarh
- Satrenga, Chhattisgarh
