= Banki Mongra =

Human settlement in India

Banki Mogra बंकी मोंगरा
- Located in Chhattisgarh
- Coordinates: 22.409°N 82.606°E
- Country: India
- State: Chhattisgarh
- District: Korba district

Languages
  - Official: Hindi; Chhattisgarhi
- Time zone: UTC+5:30 (Indian Standard Time)

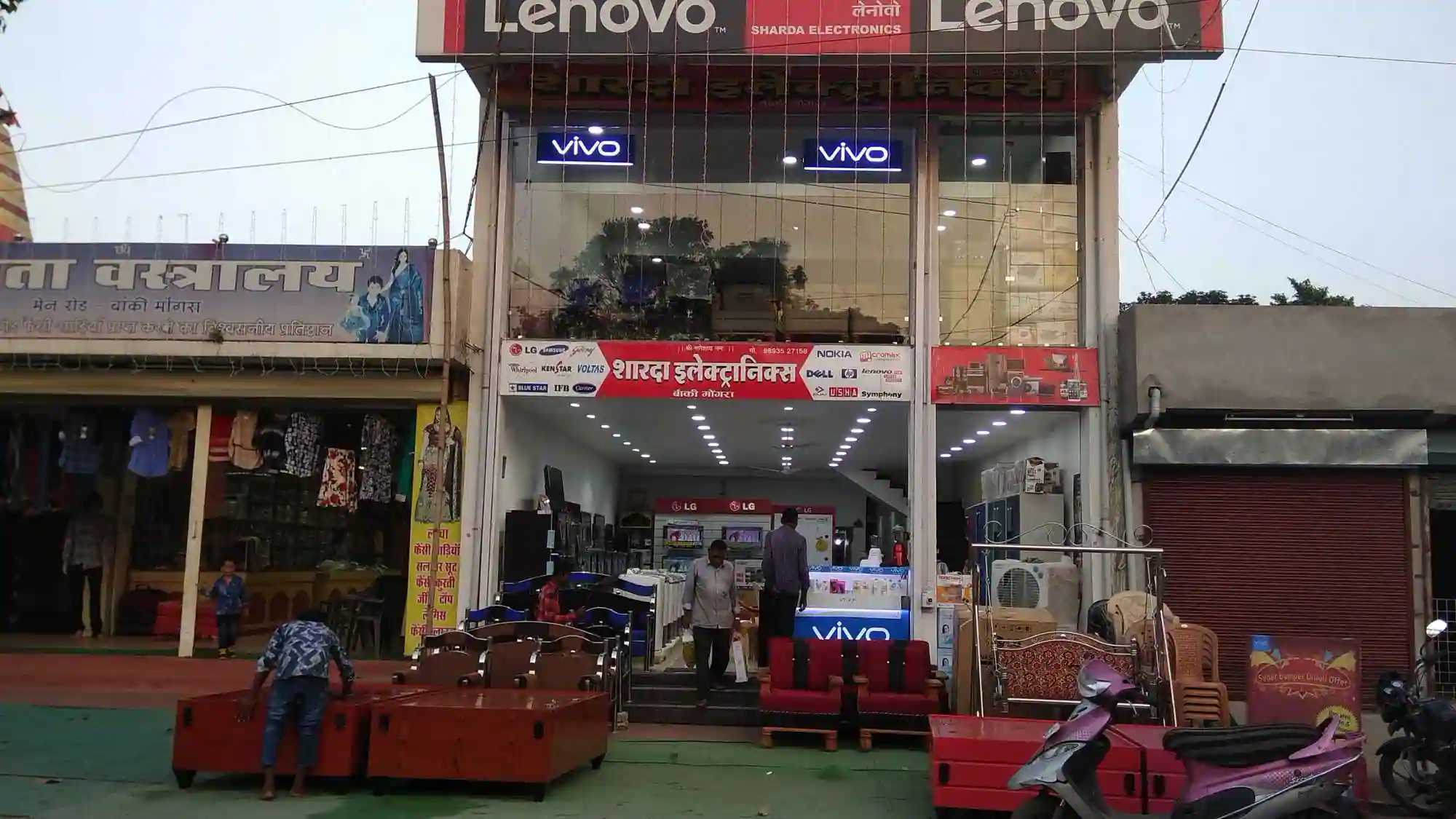
Banki Mongra - Power Capital of Chhattisgarh

Banki Mongra is a region in the city of Korba in the central Indian state of Chhattisgarh. The region is known for its underground coal mines which play a significant role in the region's economy and employment.

== Coal Mining in Banki Mongra ==
Banki Mongra is well known for its coal mines. As of 2011, the main active mines include:

1. Number 3-4 Mine
2. Number 5-6 Mine
3. Number 9-10 Mine

The other mines are no longer active.

The coal production in the area is now primarily carried out in the "Banki Main Mine" and "Surakachhar 5&6 Inclines". These mines are the key contributors to coal production in Banki Mongra, serving the energy and industrial needs of the region and beyond.

== Economic importance ==
The mining operations in Banki Mongra and the surrounding areas form a backbone for Korba's industrial sector, as Korba is known as the "Power Capital of Chhattisgarh" due to its coal-based power plants. The coal from these mines supports power generation and industries, both locally and across the state.

Despite the industrial activity, some parts of Banki Mongra still retain areas of natural vegetation. Trees and shrubland exist in pockets, especially in areas away from active mining. While there are no major rivers directly flowing through Banki Mongra, the broader Korba region is drained by rivers like the Hasdeo River.

The specific area of Banki Mongra in square kilometers is not readily available in public records, as it is primarily recognized as a mining region rather than an administrative entity with clearly defined boundaries.

== Transport ==
The township is well connected to Bilaspur, Raipur and Ambikapur via road. The nearest Railway station is Gevra Road Korba. The Korba airstrip is 12 km from Banki Mongra.

== Administration ==
Banki Mongra earlier came under Municipal Corporation Korba, which included 13 wards under Banki Mongra Zone. But the Chhattisgarh government separated Banki Mongra from Municipal Corporation Korba and created a separate Municipal Council Banki Mongra, which has 30 wards. This is the second largest urban body after Municipal Corporation Korba in Korba district.

== Demographics ==
The population is about 118,000..

== Culture ==
Local Hindu and Chhattisgarhi festivals of Chherchera, Makar Sankranti, Holi, Hareli, Teeja Pora, Ganesh Chaturthi, Navratri, Dussehra and Diwali and EID and many other festivals are celebrated.

== Hospitals ==
- SECL Hospital
- New Korba Hospital
- Balaji Superspeciality Trauma & Care Hospital
- Krishna Hospital
- Primary Health Centre Mongra
- Sub Health Centre Katainaar (Banki)
- Sub Health Centre, Kudhripara (Banki)
- Sub Health Centre, Ghurdeva (Banki)

== See also ==
- Korba Coalfield
