= Rajgamar =

- Census town
- Location in Chhattisgarh, India Rajgamar (India)
- Coordinates: 22.38197°N 82.83298°E
- Country: India
- State: Chhattisgarh
- District: Korba

Population (2001)
  - Total: 12,595

Languages
  - Official: Hindi, Chhattisgarhi
- Time zone: UTC+5:30 (IST)
- PIN: 495683
- Vehicle registration: CG-12

Rajgamar is a census town in Korba district in the Indian state of Chhattisgarh.

== Demographics ==
As of 2001 India census, Rajgamar had a population of 12,595. Males constitute 51% of the population and females 49%. Rajgamar has an average literacy rate of 64%, higher than the national average of 59.5%: male literacy is 75%, and female literacy is 53%. In Rajgamar, 16% of the population is under 6 years of age.
