= Satrenga, Chhattisgarh =

Place in Chhattisgarh, India

Satrenga also locally known as Goa of Chhattisgarh is a place located in catchment area of southern end of Hasdeo-Bango reservoir approximately located 36 km northward from Korba, Korba district in the Indian state of Chhattisgarh.

This place has been developed into an eco-tourism site by Government of Chhattisgarh. Satrenga is surrounded by Mahadev hills and has many small islands in the middle of its reservoir.

It is famous for its bluish water, mountains and greenery. It hosts water sports and activities such as boating, camping, and trekking along with luxury resorts. Mahadev Mountain is nearby. Satrenga is a preferred shooting location in Chhattisgarh. Many Chhattisgarhi regional songs were shot there.

== Transport ==
=== Road ===
The nearest bus stand is Korba Bus Terminal.

=== Rail ===
The nearest railway station is Korba railway station.

=== Air ===
Satrenga has a dedicated helipad.

The nearest well-connected airport is Raipur Airport, 255 km from Satrenga.
