= Amritdhara Falls =

Amritdhara waterfall
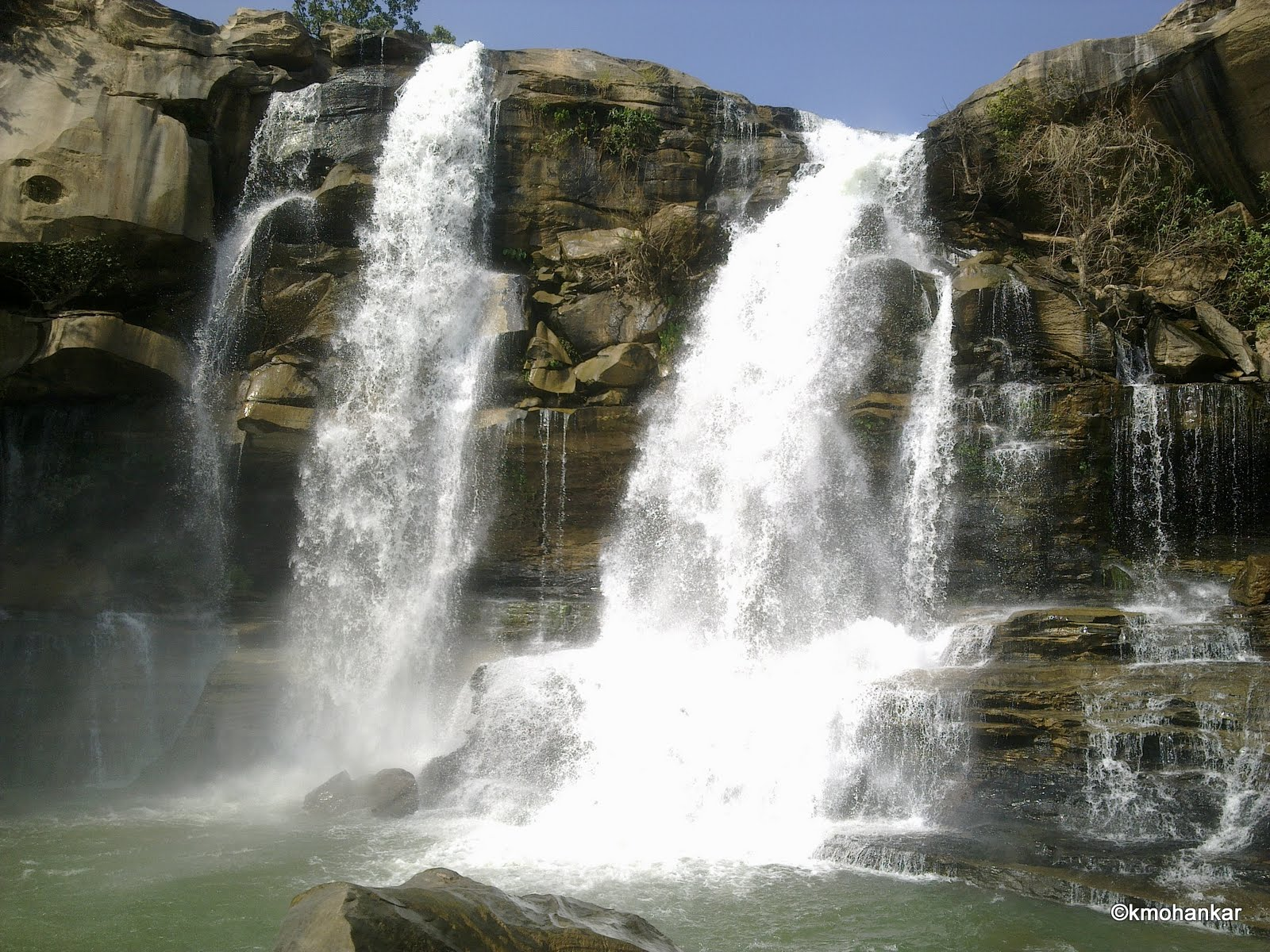

- Location within India
- Location: Manendragarh-Chirmiri-Bharatpur district, Chhattisgarh, India
- Coordinates: 23°20′00″N 82°19′17″E
- Watercourse: Hasdeo River

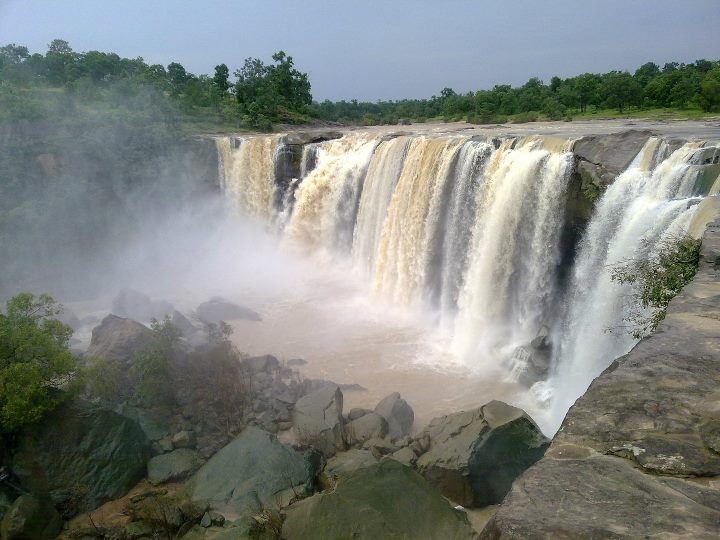
View of Amrit Dhara falls

Amrit Dhara is a natural waterfall located in Manendragarh-Chirmiri-Bharatpur district, state of Chhattisgarh, India. It originates from the Hasdeo River, which is a tributary of the Mahanadi River. The fall is situated at a distance of 50 km from Chirmiri and 30 km from Manendragarh. The waterfall is located on the Manendragarh-Baikunthpur road NH 43. The Amrit Dhara waterfall in Manendragarh-Chirmiri-Bharatpur in Chhattisgarh in India falls from a height of 90.0 ft (27.4 metres). The waterfall is about 10.0–15.0 ft (3.0–4.6 metres) wide.

== History ==
This waterfall is also famous for a Shiva temple. Around the spot a famous mela is held every year. This mela was a started by Ramanuj Pratap Singhu deo, who was the King of Koriya State, in 1936. The fair takes place during the festival occasion of Mahashiv Ratri and lakhs of devotees come to take the place during the fair.

The area around is also a famous picnic spot, especially for families. The beauty of the place enchants every visitor and lures them to visit the place on and often.

== Geography ==
The fall's coordinates are 23°19'55 N 82°19'14 E. The climate is dry and the temperature ranges from a maximum of 40C to a minimum of 30C.

== Transport ==
=== Air ===
The nearest airport is Raipur (Swami Vivekananda Airport Raipur, approx. 330 km from the place)

=== Train ===
The nearest railway station is 20 km away at Manendragarh. The railway station is Chirimiri is approximately 50 km away.

=== Road ===
20 km from the town Manendragarh. Road, take a bus or taxi to Nagpur, and hire a taxi to the fall.

== See also ==
- List of waterfalls
- List of waterfalls in India
- Nagpur
- Tourism in Chhattisgarh
