= Manendragarh =

- town
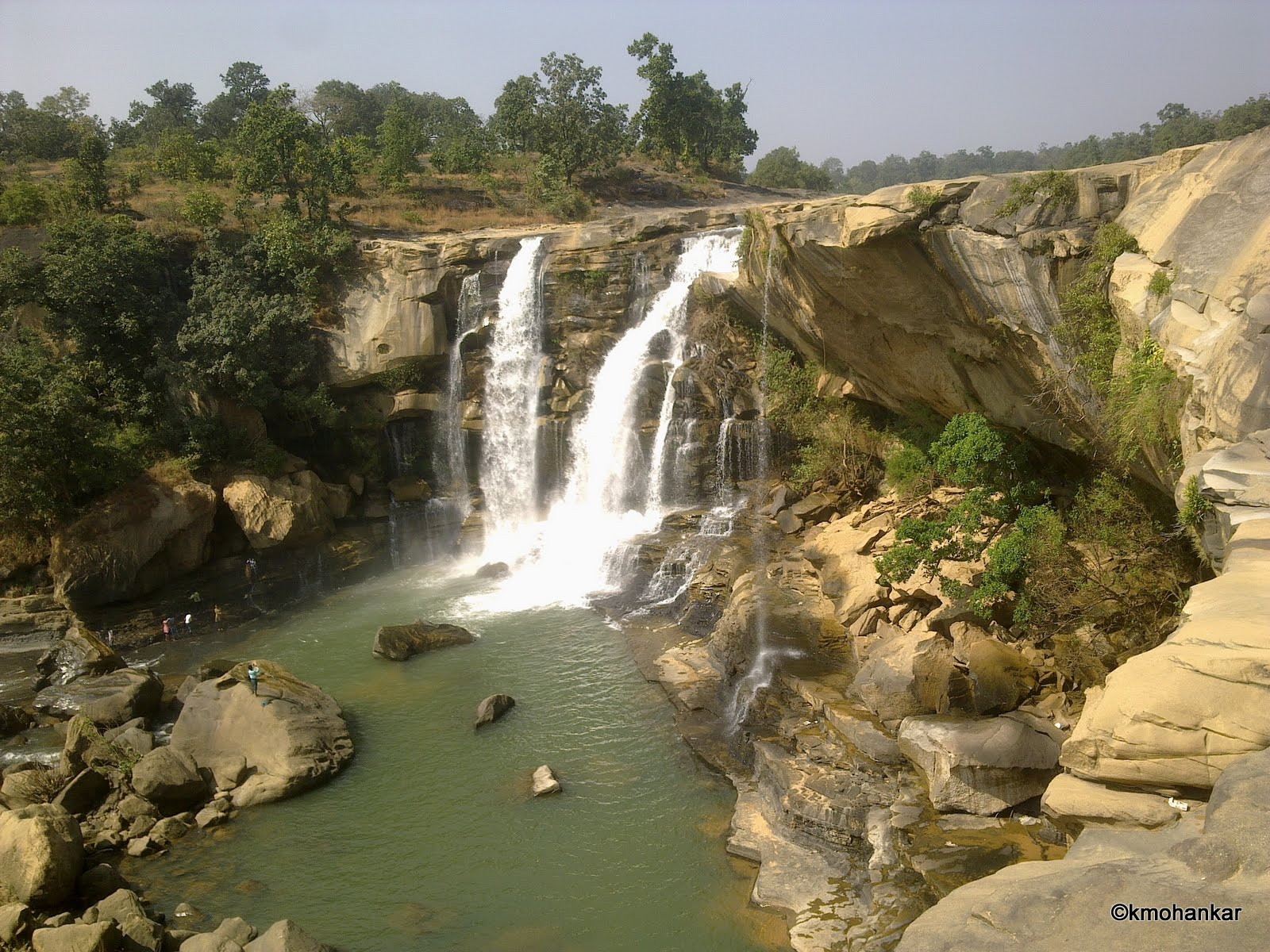
- Amritdhara falls on Hasdeo River

- Location in Chhattisgarh, India Manendragarh (India)
- Coordinates: 23.1922°N 82.2003°E
- Country: India
- State: Chhattisgarh
- District: Manendragarh-Chirmiri-Bharatpur

Government
  - Body: Nagar Palika Parishad of Manendragarh

Area
  - Total: 20 km^{2} (7.7 sq mi)

Population (2011)
  - Total: 33,071
  - Density: 1,700/km^{2} (4,300/sq mi)

Languages
  - Official: Hindi; Chhattisgarhi
- Time zone: UTC+5:45 (IST)
- PIN: 497442
- Telephone code: 07771
- Vehicle registration: CG-32

Manendragarh is a town and administrative headquarters of Manendragarh-Chirmiri-Bharatpur district in the Indian state of Chhattisgarh, India.

== Geography ==
Manendragarh is a town and administrative district headquarters of Manendragarh-Chirmiri-Bharatpur district in the Indian state of Chhattisgarh, India. Situated near the state's border with Madhya Pradesh, it became part of the new district, which was carved out of Koriya district on 9 September 2022. It spans across the Ganges and Mahanadi river basins. Gopad River, a tributary of Son River runs north of the town. Hasdeo River, a major tributary of Mahanadi originates in the Mendra village and runs south of the town. Manendragarh has a significant forest cover.

== Geology ==
The area is part of a coal mining belt. There are minor deposits of limestone, fire clay, and iron oxide in Manendragarh.

The Marine Gondwana Fossil Park is located near Ammakherwa village in the nearby Surguja district, Chhattisgarh. Spread over 16,200 m^{2} (174,000 sq ft), the site extends for about 1 km (0.62 mi) in the Satpura Range near the confluence of Hasia Nala with Hasdeo River. The site was discovered in 1954 and was declared as a National Geological Monument by the Geological Survey of India in 1983.

== Demographics ==
As per the 2011 Census of India, Manendragarh had a population of 30,748. Males constituted 53% of the population and females 47%. The town had an average literacy rate of 72%, higher than the national average of 59.5% with male literacy at 79%, and female literacy at 64%. About 13% of the population was under six years of age.

== Transport ==
The Manendragarh railway station is located on the Anuppur-Chirmiri rail line. The National High way 43 passes through Manendragarh.
