= Hasdeo Arand =

Forest in Chhattisgarh, India

Coordinates: 22°36′00″N 82°48′00″E

- Interactive map of Hasdeo Arand

Geography
- Location: Chhattisgarh, India
- Area: 170,000 ha (420,000 acres)

The Hasdeo River runs through the Hasdeo Arand forest.

Hasdeo Arand is a forest in the state of Chhattisgarh in central India. The forest is 170,000 hectares in area and is home to a diverse ecology and Adivasi communities such as the Gonds. It is on top of the Hasdeo Arand coalfield in the north of Chhattisgarh. The Government of India proposed to mine the coal, which would have destroyed the forest. The Hasdeo river runs through the forest. The forest comes under the Korba, Surajpur, and Surguja districts of the state.

== People ==
The Hasdeo Arand forest is estimated to be home to 10,000 people from the Gond, Oraon and other tribes. A Wildlife Institute of India report also estimated that around 60–70% of the annual income of the local communities came from forest-based resources.

== Ecology ==
The forest is home to 82 species of birds, 167 varieties of vegetation out of which 18 are considered threatened, and endangered butterfly species. The forest is a habitat and a major migratory corridor for elephants and has had confirmed sightings of tigers. The Indian Council of Forestry Research and Education has described it as "the largest unfragmented forest in Central India consisting of pristine Sal and teak forests." The forest also acts as the water catchment area for the Hasdeo river, thus maintaining its perennial flow.

== Hasdeo Arand coalfield ==
The Hasdeo Arand coalfield is spread over an area of 1,879.6 km^{2}, and comprises 23 coal blocks. Hasdeo Arand is a large coalfield with 1.369 billion tonnes of proven coal reserves and 5.179 billion of estimated coal reserves.

=== Mining ===
The coalfield was recommended to be mined by the Chhattisgarh government in 2010 by diverting 1,898.393 hectares of forest to the Parsa East and Kanta Bavan (PEKB) coalfields which would be allotted to RRVUNL, a state-owned power utility of Rajasthan. In June 2011, the forest panel under the Union Ministry of Environment, Forests and Climate Change recommended against allowing this on the basis of the ecological value of the forest and the amount of trees to be felled, however they were overruled by the then environment minister Jairam Ramesh, who cleared the proposal. This was challenged in the National Green Tribunal (NGT) which suspended the mining work in 2014, but the order was stayed by the Supreme Court, where the matter remains pending.

Jairam Ramesh had justified his approval of the project by saying that the PEKB coalfields were located at fringe of the biodiversity rich area of the forest with a separate watershed, and that the coal power plant which would use the coal from PEKB coalfield was a supercritical thermal power plant with lower emissions, for wildlife concerns he suggested drawing up a wildlife management plan from the Wildlife Institute of India. He also said that the plan had been subsequently revised and the mine would be built in two phases, with phase 1 covering 762 hectares and phase 2 covering 1,136 hectares of the forest. These arguments were rejected by the NGT as anthrpocentric reasoning which did not take into account eco-centric reasons which would be necessary for judging whether the development was sustainable.

On April 13, 2013 Adani Enterprises announced that its subsidiary Adani Mines would become the mine developer and operator for the PEKB coalfields under a contract with RRVUNL, giving it access to the 450 million tonnes of coal reserves of the mine. The ongoing mining has been considered to be a fait accompli as the case challenging it is still pending in the supreme court.

The Chhattisgarh government approved the phase 2 extension of PEKB coalfields on 22 March 2022, and approved mining in the adjoining Parsa Coal block on April 6, 2022. Activists alleged that this would've required the felling of 2,42,670 (242,670) trees in the forest, while local villages contended that the felling of trees violated their Community Forest Resource (CFR) rights granted under the Forest Rights Act, while Chhattisgarh government had previously attempted to annul those rights, under the current act there is no provision to do so. This led to large protests and the local police intervening to pause the felling of trees. Coal mining was halted in the PEKB coalfields by mid-August 2022 following widespread protests against the phase 2 extension of it led by local villages that would've been displaced or affected by it.

==== Role of Adani Enterprises ====
Although the PEKB coalfields were allotted to RRVUNL, the mining operations were outsourced to Adani Enterprises under a joint venture known as Parsa Kente Collieries Limited with a 74% stake for Adani Enterprises. This venture was controversial since it gave Adani the ability to sell coal "rejects" from the mine. Adani considers these coal rejects to be waste products of an inferior quality produced after washing of raw coal, a report from Scroll.in found them selling these coal rejects to three Adani owned power plants at rates far lower than the market rates and those of the state owned Coal India Limited. Since the Union Ministry of Environment, Forests and Climate Change had changed its rules to allow reject coal to be used by thermal power plants in 2020, it has been contended that even these reject coal should've been sent to RRVUNL run power plants to meet the increasing coal demands of the state instead of opening new mines.

The report also found using railway records that of the 15 million tonnes of both washed and reject coal transported out of the coalfield, 2.6 million tonnes of reject coal ended up in Adani power owned Raipur Energen power plant, 0.08 million tonnes were sent through a rail siding which supplied coal to two power plants of which one was owned by Adani power. In November 2022, another Adani power plant (Mahan Energen Limited) was found to have received reject coal from PEKB. These reject coal were purchased far below market rates at ₹450/tonne for those purchased in 2021. The Raipur Energen plant received 5.5 million tonnes of coal from its railway siding in total in 2021, of which 2.6 million tonnes were reject coal with 65% or higher ash content and low calorific value, the report calculated that a blend with a decently high calorific value and lower ash content required by a coal power plant of its type to operate normally would've either required the plant to acquire higher quality coal than was available from domestic sources or operate at an ideal maximum efficiency rarely achieved in real world conditions.

==== Exhaustion of PEKB coalfield ====
The PEKB phase I coalfield is nearing complete exhaustion. Although it was initially estimated that the coalfield had reserves of 137 million tonnes of coal and would hence last 15 years, it was found that 55 million tonnes of this was inaccessible. The rate of mining has also increased rising from 10 million tonnes a year to 15 million tonnes a year, in September 2020, the RRVUNL stated that only 20 million tonnes of coal was left in the mine.

=== Protests and opposition ===
The local communities and villages have opposed mining activities for a long time in the forest as they depend on it for their livelihoods, and as the mining activities would disrupt the ecology and affect their water supply, challenging the laws and orders allowing mining to take place in the forest legally in the High Court, NGT, and the Supreme Court. They have formed protest outfits such as the "Hasdeo Arand Bachao Sangharsh Samiti" (Save Hasdeo Arand Struggle Committee). They have been supported by civil society groups such as the Chhattisgarh Bachao Andolan, the protests have also received support from social media and many urban folk of the state. Congress leader Rahul Gandhi said that he had issues with the approval granted to mining activity in the forest, despite his party being in power in the state.

Widespread protests forced the state government to halt the second phase of mining at PEKB, due to opposition by local villagers to the felling of trees, they also claimed that the consent of gram sabhas required for such an exercise according to the Fifth Schedule of the Indian Constitution, was faked by the Chhattisgarh Forest Department as no official information about it was given to the villagers and some of the signatures in the attendance sheet of such meetings were of dead villagers.

==== Government Response ====
Following the protests, the Chhattisgarh Legislative Assembly adopted a private member resolution moved by Dharamjeet Singh urging the Central government to cancel allocation of all the coal mining blocks in the Hasdeo region, however despite bipartisan support for the resolution from both the BJP and the Congress MLAs, the two parties disagreed over whether the Central government or the State government should stop the mining, with the Congress believing that it is up to the Central Government to stop the mining, while the BJP contended that the State government must cancel the clearances given to allow mining activity. In September 2022, the state Health Minister T. S. Singh Deo with the consent of Chief Minister Baghel announced that no mining activity will take place in the two new blocks that were to be opened as part of Parsa and Kete extension, however the state government had allowed district officials to continue on with the phase II of PEKB after taking the local villagers along.

A Washington Post investigation found the BJP controlled Central Government to be using central agencies like the income tax authorities, Enforcement Directorate, and the Central Bureau of Investigation against activists involved in the protests against coal mining in Hasdeo, with internal documents reportedly expressing anger over activists filing lawsuits, mobilising protestors and expressing public dissent, with one environmentalist being accused of "divulging internal information of India" and "conspiring against Adani" for sharing details on the mining with British and Australian researchers. A senior coal ministry official in an interview stated the government's intent to get Hasdeo operational as soon as possible and calling the derailment of the process as "unacceptable". In one instance following government raids, lawyers belonging to the NGO LIFE, who were fighting a lawsuit on behalf of the locals in the forest, withdrew from the case.
