= CSEB =

CSEB may refer to:

- Compressed stabilized earth block, a building material, see Compressed earth block
- Chhattisgarh State Electricity Board, a former Indian electricity generation company, now Chhattisgarh State Power Generation Company
