= Jhagrakhand =

Jhagrakhand north jhagrakhand
- Town
- Nickname: jkd
- Location in Chhattisgarh, India Jhagrakhand (India)
- Coordinates: 23.18785°N 82.17229°E
- Country: India
- State: Chhattisgarh
- District: Manendragarh-Chirmiri-Bharatpur

Government
  - Type: democratic
  - Body: nagar panchayat

Population (2013)
  - Total: 9,007

Languages
  - Official: Hindi; Chhattisgarhi
- Time zone: UTC+5:30 (IST)
- Postal code: 497446
- Vehicle registration: CG-16

Jhagrakhand is a town and a nagar panchayat in manendragarh district in the Indian state of Chhattisgarh.

== Demographics ==
As of 2001 India census, Jhagrakhand had a population of 7507. Males constitute 52% of the population and females 48%. Jhagrakhand has an average literacy rate of 63%, higher than the national average of 59.5%: male literacy is 72%, and female literacy is 54%. In Jhagrakhand, 13% of the population is under 6 years of age.
