= Hasdeo Thermal Power Station =

Building in India

- Hasdeo Thermal Power Station in Chhattisgarh
- Country: India
- Location: Korba, Chhattisgarh
- Coordinates: 22.4118°N 82.6888°E
- Status: Operational
- Commission date: Unit 1: June 21, 1983; Unit 2: March 31, 1984; Unit 3: March 26, 1985; Unit 4: March 13, 1986
- Owner: CSPGCL
- Operator: CSPGCL

Thermal power station
- Primary fuel: Coal

Power generation
- Units operational: 4 X 210 MW
- Nameplate capacity: 840 MW

The Hasdeo Thermal Power Station or Korba West Thermal Power Station is an 840 megawatt (MW) coal-fired power station at Korba in Chhattisgarh, India. The power station is owned and operated by Chhattisgarh State Power Generation Company, a publicly owned generation utility formed in 2009 following the restructuring of the Chhattisgarh State Electricity Board.

== Capacity ==
The 840 MW power station comprises four units of 210 MW each:

Unit Number	Capacity (MW)	Status	Date of Commissioning
1	210	Running	1983 June
2	210	Running	1984 March
3	210	Running	1985 March
4	210	Running	1986 March
