= Korba Super Thermal Power Station =

Power plant in Chhattisgarh, India

Korba Super Thermal Power Plant
- Country: India
- Location: Jamnipali, Chhattisgarh
- Coordinates: 22.3858°N 82.6816°E
- Status: Operational
- Commission date: 1983
- Owner: National Thermal Power Corporation

Thermal power station
- Primary fuel: Coal

Power generation
- Units operational: 7
- Nameplate capacity: 2,600 MW (3,500,000 hp)

External links
- Website: www.ntpc.co.in/power-generation/coal-based-power-stations/korba

Korba Super Thermal Power Plant is located at Jamnipali in Korba district in the Indian state of Chhattisgarh. It is one of the coal-based power plants of National Thermal Power Corporation (NTPC). The coal for the plant is sourced from Kusmunda and Gevra Mines. The source of water for the plant is Hasdeo River.

== Capacity ==
Stage	Unit #	Installed capacity (MW)	Date of commissioning
1st	1	200	1983 March
1st	2	200	1983 October
1st	3	200	1984 March
2nd	4	500	1987 May
2nd	5	500	1988 March
2nd	6	500	1989 March
3rd	7	500	2010 December
Total	7	2600	

== Transport ==
Korba Super Thermal Power Plant is located on the Champa-Gevra Road branch line.
