= Chharchha =

- Town
- Location in Chhattisgarh, India Chharchha (India)
- Coordinates: 23.34515°N 82.52888°E
- Country: India
- State: Chhattisgarh
- District: Koriya

Population (2001)
  - Total: 15,352

Languages
  - Official: Hindi; Chhattisgarhi
- Time zone: UTC+5:30 (IST)
- Vehicle registration: CG

Chharchha is a census town in Koriya District in the state of Chhattisgarh, India.

== Demographics ==
As of 2001 India census, Chharchha had a population of 15,352. Males constitute 54% of the population and females 46%. Chharchha has an average literacy rate of 69%, higher than the national average of 59.5%; with male literacy of 77% and female literacy of 59%. 13% of the population is under 6 years of age. Chharchha is basically a colony developed by SECL (a subsidiary of Coal India Limited). Chharchha is famous for its coal production from its two mines, Chharchha East and Chharchha West.
