= Godhi, Korba =

Godhi is a village near Korba in Chhattisgarh, India.
