= Manendragarh-Chirmiri-Bharatpur district =

- District of Chhattisgarh
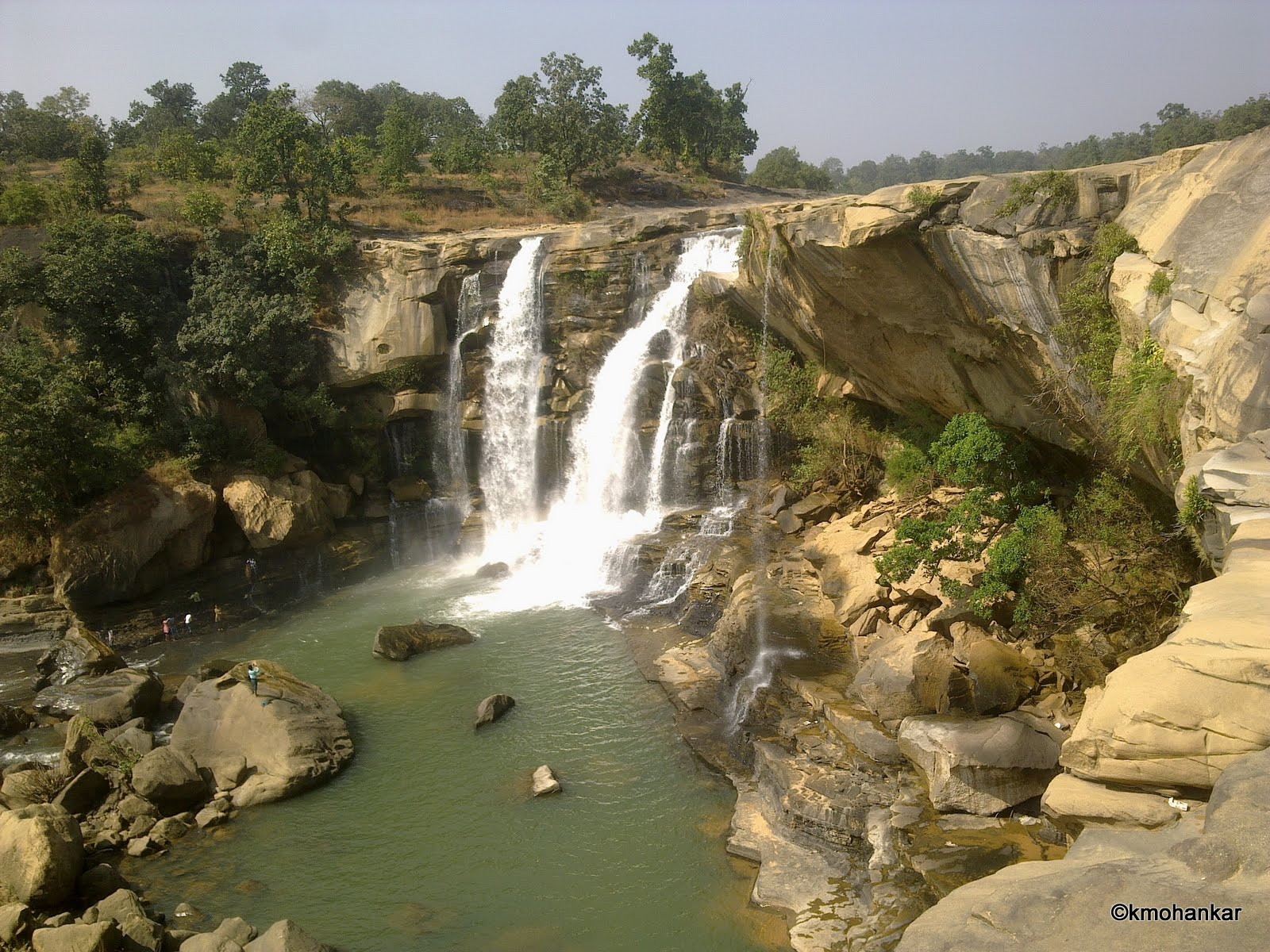
- Amritdhara falls on the Hasdeo River

- Location in Chhattisgarh
- Interactive map of Manendragarh-Chirmiri-Bharatpur district
- Coordinates (Manendragarh-Chirmiri): 23.22°N 82.20°E
- Country: India
- State: Chhattisgarh
- Division: Surguja
- Headquarters: Manendragarh
- Tehsils: 6

Government
  - Vidhan Sabha constituencies: 3

Area
  - Total: 4,226 km^{2} (1,632 sq mi)

Population (2011)
  - Total: 370,000

Demographics
- Time zone: UTC+05:30 (IST)
- Vehicle registration: CG-35
- Major highways: 3
- Website: manendragarh-chirmiri-bharatpur.cg.gov.in

Manendragarh-Chirmiri-Bharatpur district is a district of Chhattisgarh state in India. Manendragarh-chirmiri-Bharatpur district is located in the north western part of the state. It was formerly a part of Korea district until its separation on 9 September 2022, inaugurated by the chief minister of Chhattisgarh Bhupesh Baghel. The administrative headquarters of the district is located in Manendragarh.

The district lies in the northwesternmost part of Chhattisgarh in the Surguja division. It borders Madhya Pradesh to the north and west, Korea and Surajpur districts to the east, and Korba and Gaurela-Pendra-Marwahi districts to the south. It is mountainous and forested, and largely tribal-populated. The district was part of the princely states of Changbhakar and Korea before independence.

The district has three subdivisions: Bharatpur, Manendragarh and Khadganwan, and divided into six tehsils: Manendragarh, Bharatpur, Khadgawan, Chirmiri, Kelhari and Kotadol.

== Demographics ==
Religions in Manendragarh-Chirmiri-Bharatpur district (2011)
Religion	Percent
Hinduism	91.34%
Islam	3.92%
Other	2.61%
Christianity	1.32%
Other or not stated	0.81%
Distribution of religions

At the time of the 2011 census, Manendragarh-Chirimri-Bharatpur district had a population of 411,490. Manendragarh-Chirimri-Bharatpur district has a sex ratio of 970 females to 1000 males. 32.27% of the population lives in urban areas. Scheduled Castes and Scheduled Tribes make up 34,339 (8.35%) and 207,156 (50.34%) of the population respectively.

Languages of Manendragarh-Chirimri-Bharatpur district (2011)
1. Hindi (38.6%)
2. Surgujia (34.1%)
3. Bagheli (7.08%)
4. Chhattisgarhi (5.60%)
5. Baghoria (5.04%)
6. Odia (1.77%)
7. Bhojpuri (1.33%)
8. Bengali (1.19%)
9. Sadri (1.06%)
10. Others (4.26%)

At the time of the 2011 census, 38.58% of the population spoke Hindi, 34.09% Surgujia, 7.08% Bagheli, 5.60% Chhattisgarhi, 5.04% Baghoria, 1.77% Odia, 1.33% Bhojpuri, 1.19% Bengali and 1.06% Sadri as their first language.
