= Korba Thermal Power Station =

Coal-fired powerplant in Chhattisgarh, India

Coordinates: 22.387°N 82.682°E

The Korba Thermal Power Station or Korba East Thermal Power Station is a coal-fired power station at Korba East in Chhattisgarh, India. The power station is owned and operated by Chhattisgarh State Power Generation Company, publicly owned generation utility formed in 2009 following the restructuring of the Chhattisgarh State Electricity Board.

== Capacity ==
The installed capacity of the power plant is 450 Megawatts (4x50 MW, 2x120 MW).

Unit Number	Capacity (MW)	Status	Date of Commissioning
1	50	decommissioned	1966 September
2	50	decommissioned	1967 May
3	50	decommissioned	1968 March
4	50	decommissioned	1968 October
5	120	decommissioned	1976 April
6	120	decommissioned	1981 April
