= Dr. Shyama Prasad Mukherjee Thermal Power Station =

Building in India

- Dr. Shyama Prasad Mukherjee Thermal Power Station in Chhattisgarh
- Country: India
- Location: Korba, Chhattisgarh
- Coordinates: 22°22′16.3″N 82°44′17.9″E
- Status: Operational
- Commission date: Unit 1: March 30, 2007; Unit 2: December 11, 2007
- Owner: Chhattisgarh State Power Generation Company
- Operator: Chhattisgarh State Power Generation Company

Thermal power station
- Primary fuel: Coal

Power generation
- Units operational: 2 X 250 MW
- Nameplate capacity: 500 MW

The Dr. Shyama Prasad Mukherjee Thermal Power Station is a 500-megawatt (MW) coal-fired power station at Korba East in Chhattisgarh, India. The power station is owned and operated by Chhattisgarh State Power Generation Company, publicly owned generation utility formed in 2009 following the restructuring of the Chhattisgarh State Electricity Board.

== Capacity ==
The installed capacity of the power plant in 500 MW (2x250 MW).

Unit Number	Capacity (MW)	Status	Date of Commissioning
1	250	Running	2007 March
2	250	Running	2007 December
