= Korba, Chhattisgarh =

City in Chhattisgarh, India

Korba
- City
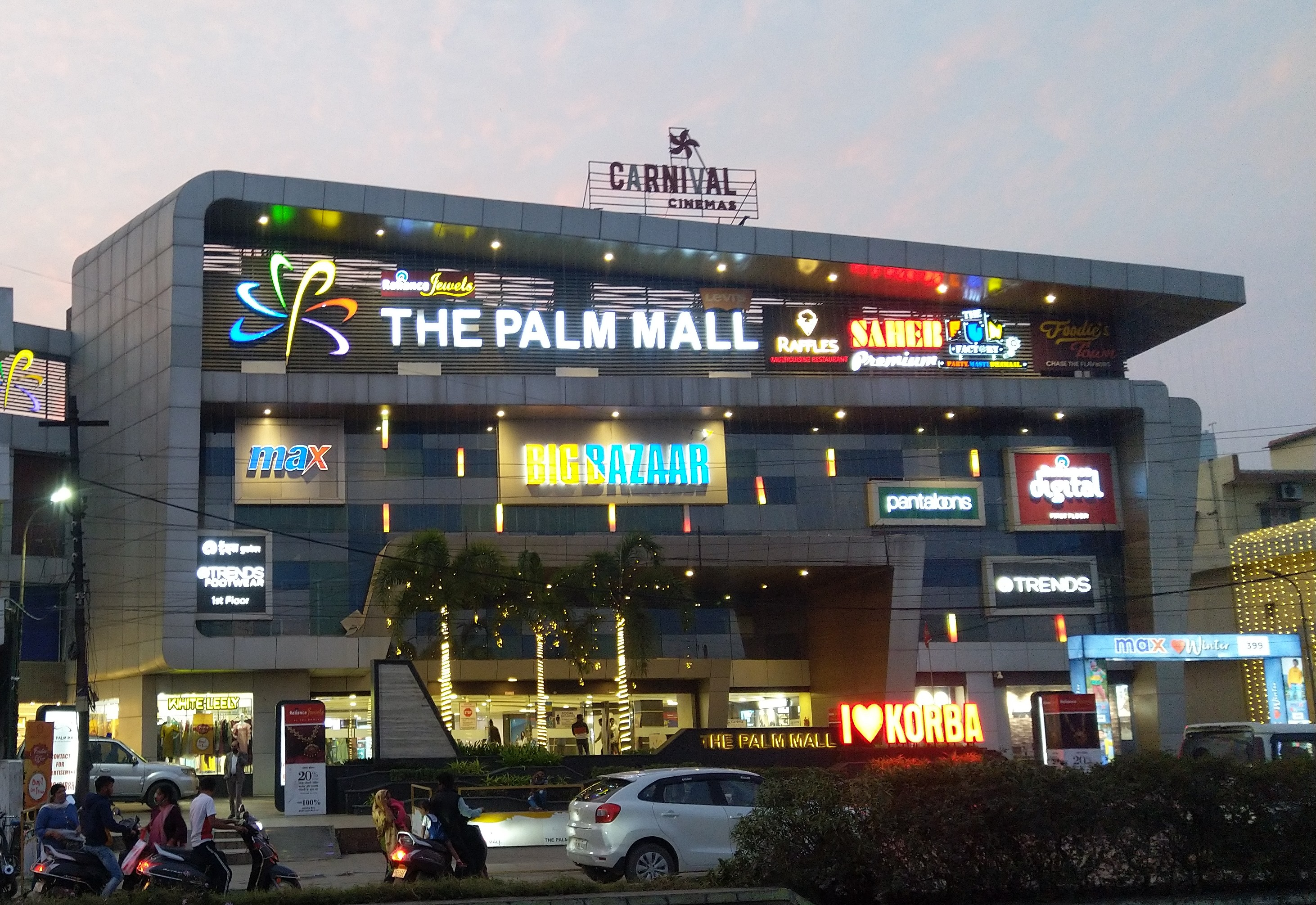
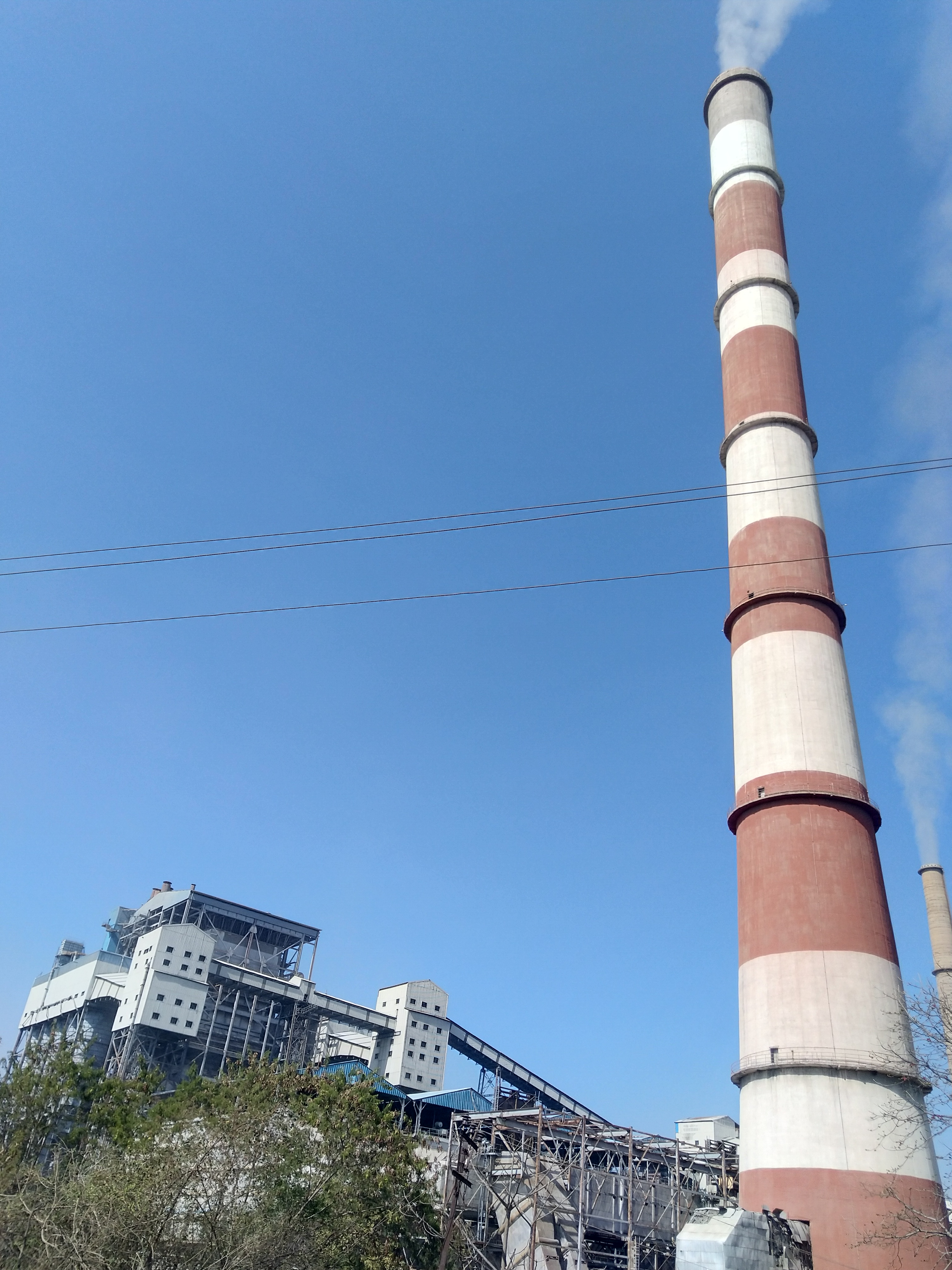
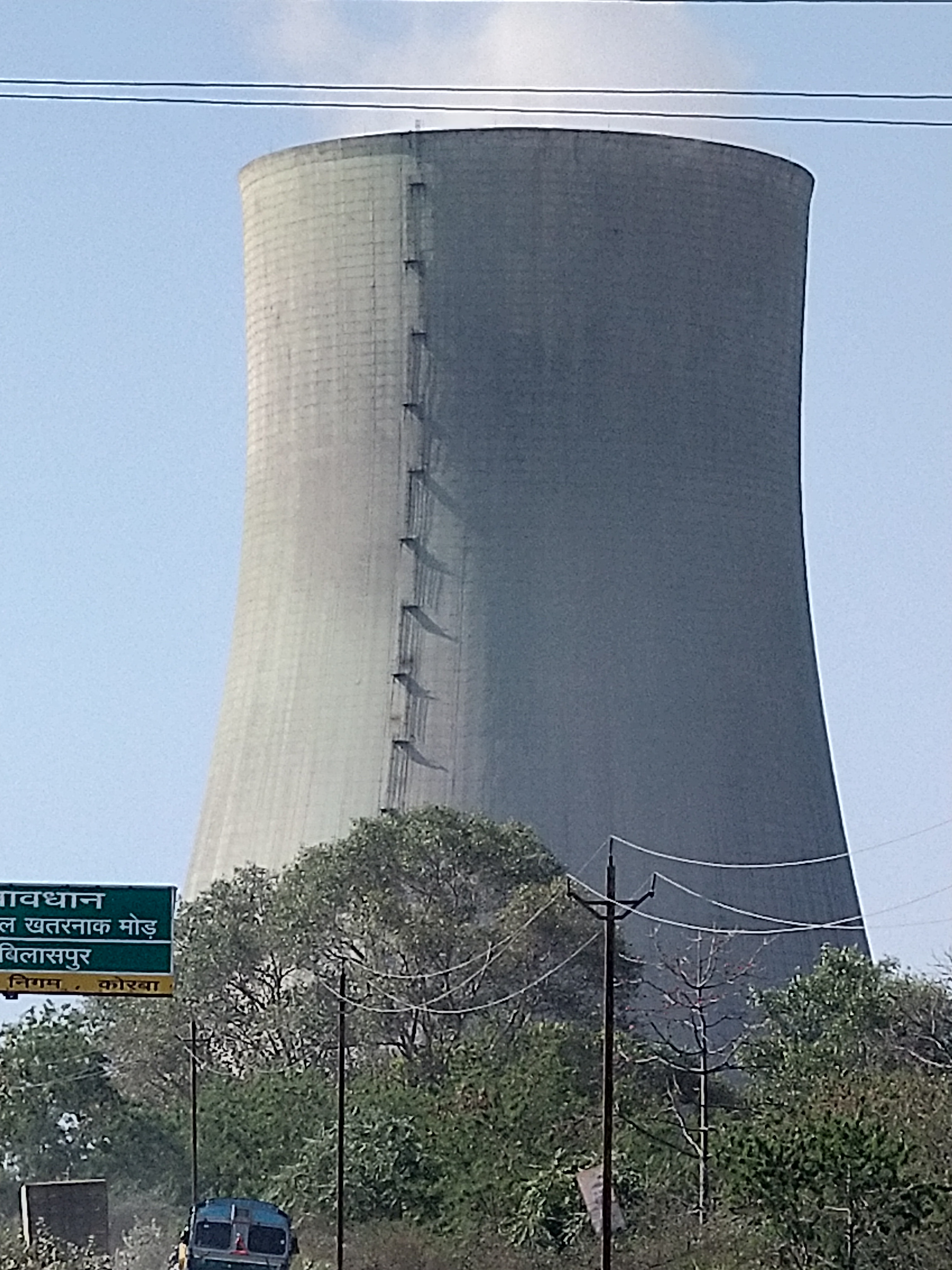
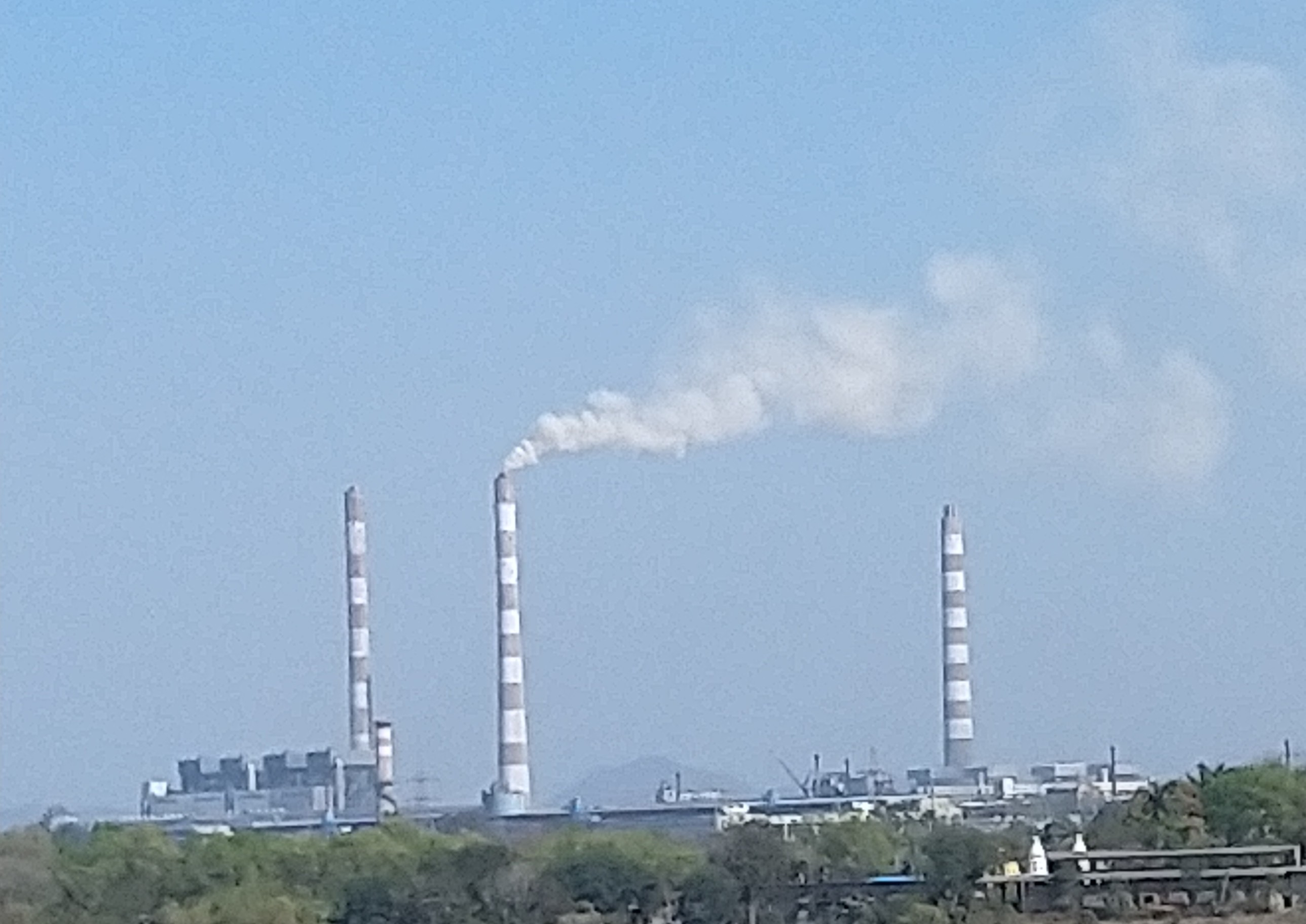
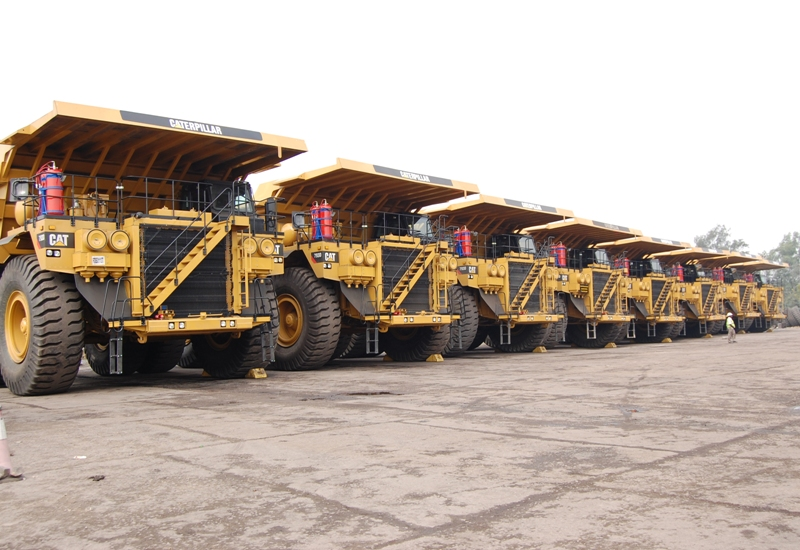
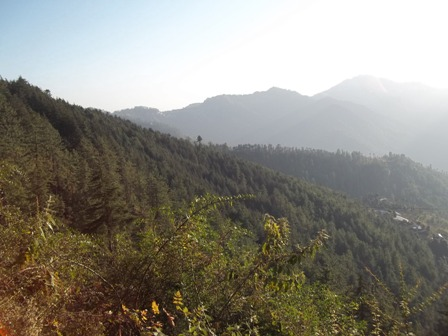
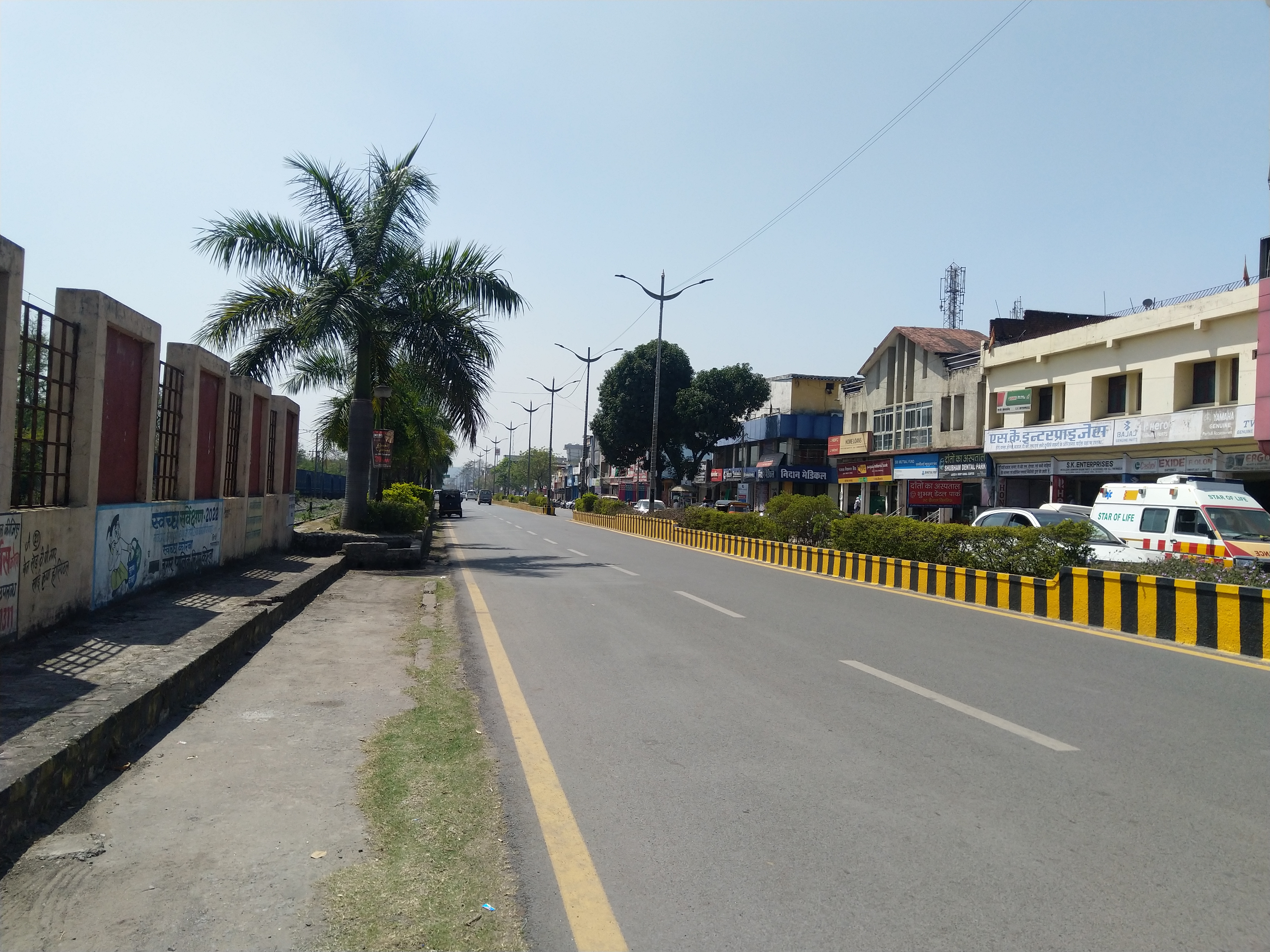
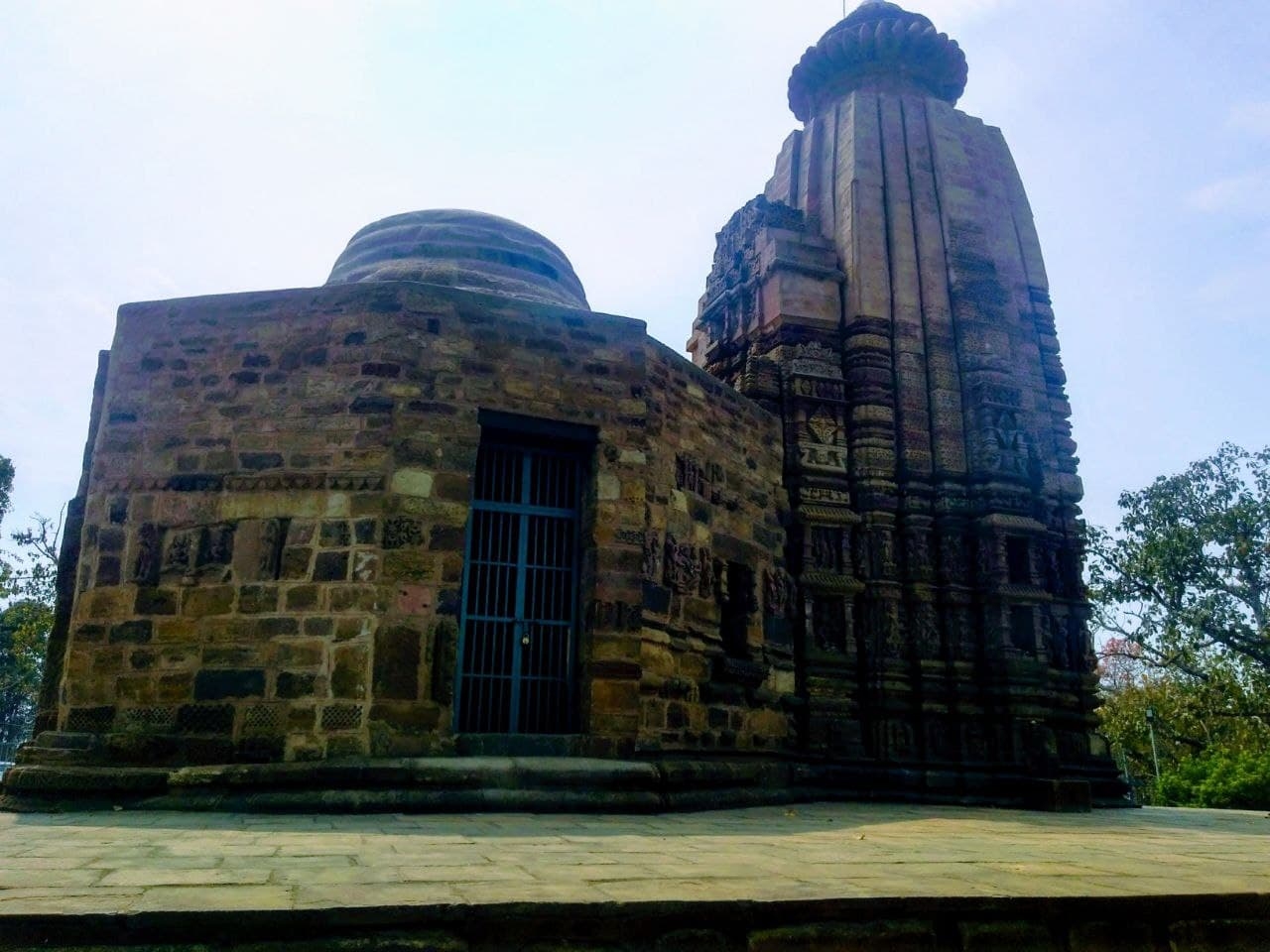
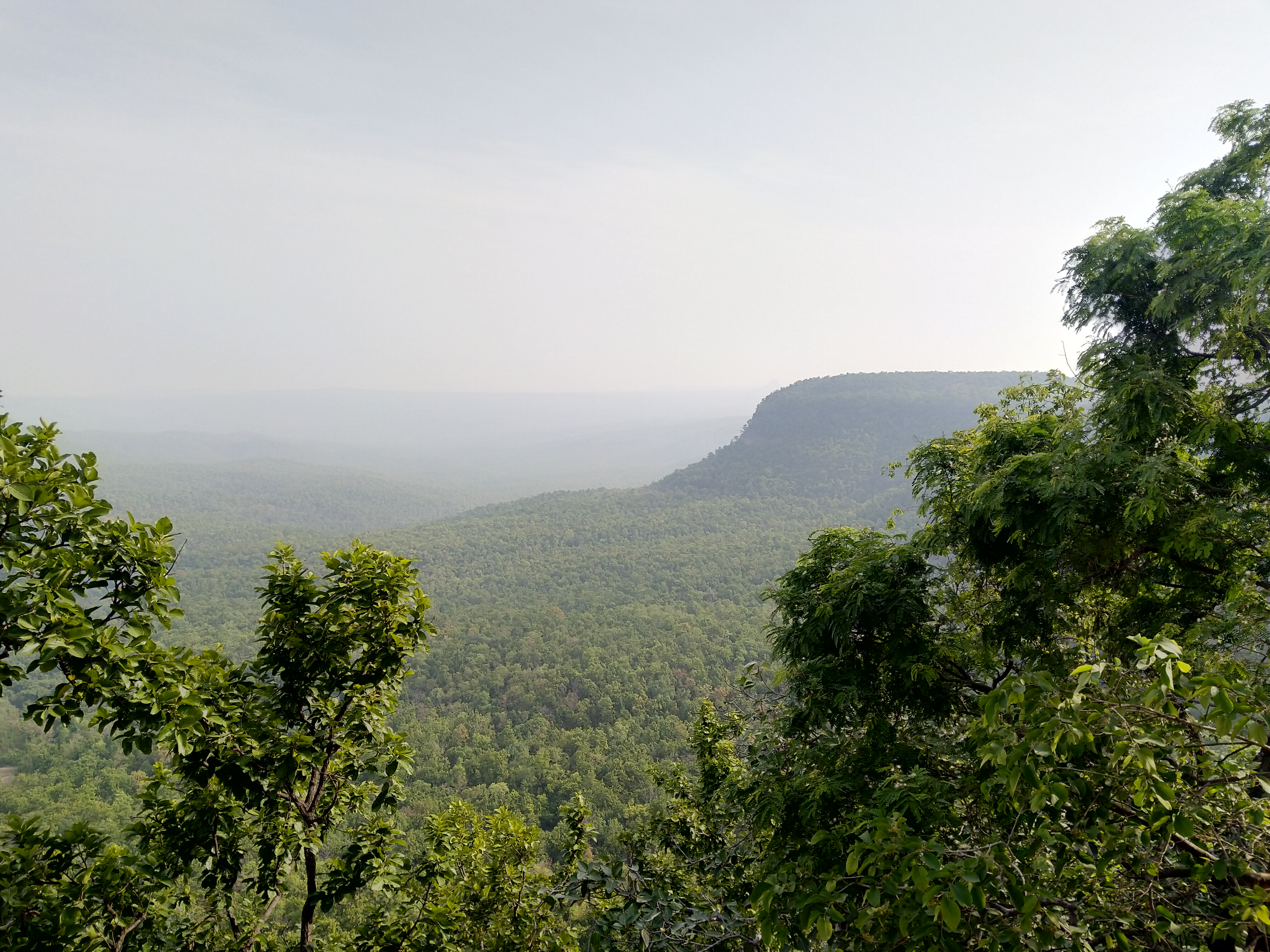
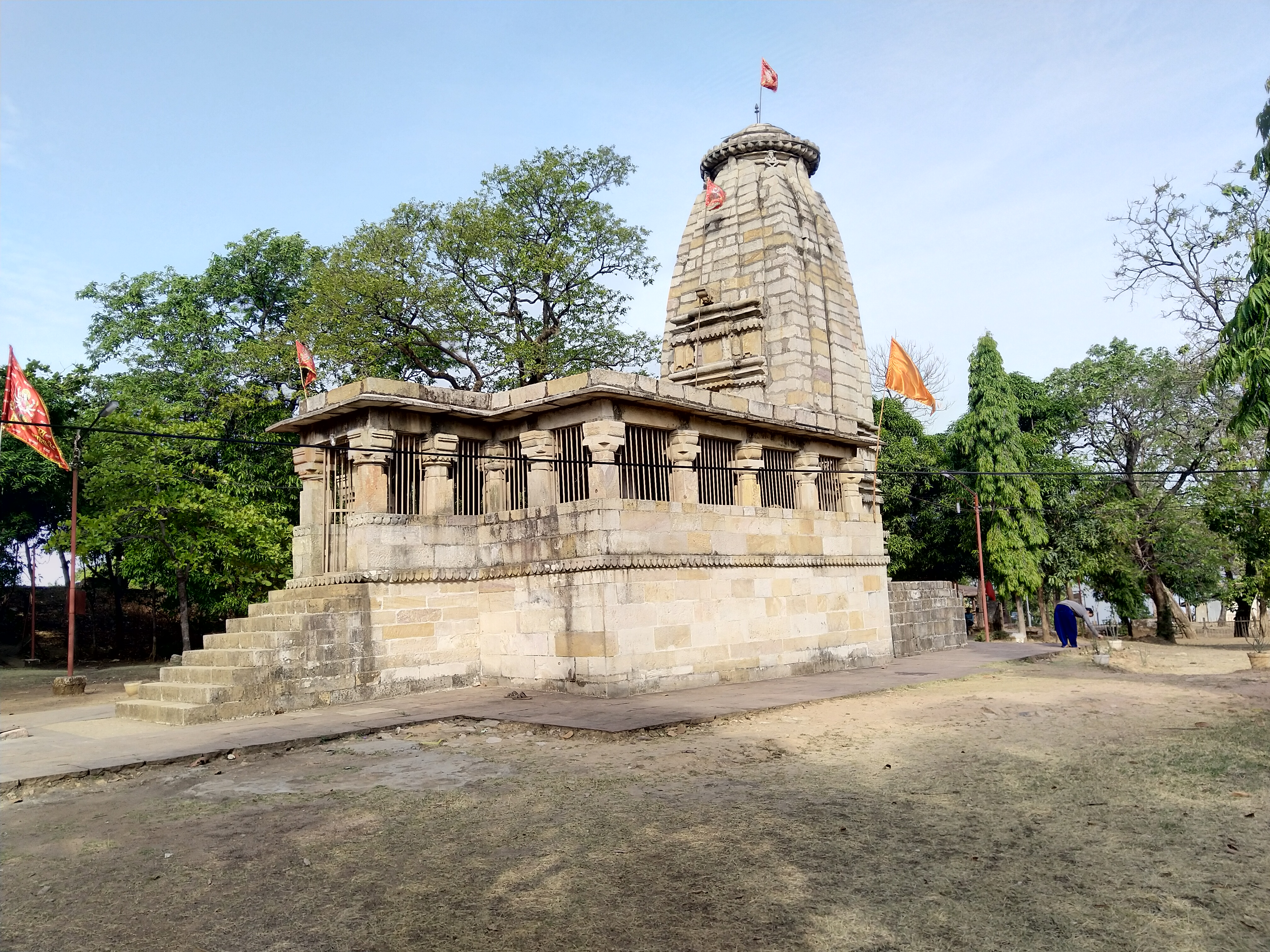
- From top, left to right: Palm mall, CSEB west Chimney and Cooling tower, BALCO aluminium plant, Dumpers at Gevra coalmines, Deopahri Forest range, Transport Nagar road, Korba Urjadhani Logo, Pali Ancient shiv mandir, Chaiturgarh hills, Chaiturgarh temple, Sunset in Satrenga

- Location in Chhattisgarh, India Korba (India)
- Coordinates: 22.35°N 82.68°E
- Country: India
- State: Chhattisgarh
- District: Korba
- Named for: Pahadi Korwas Tribes

Government
  - Type: Municipal Corporation
  - Body: Korba Municipal Corporation
  - Mayor: Sanju Devi Rajput (BJP)
  - Lok Sabha MP: Jyotsna Mahant (INC)
  - MLA: Lakhan Lal Dewangan (BJP)
  - Rank: 4th in state
- Elevation: 316 m (1,037 ft)

Population (Urban 2011)
  - Total: 365,253
  - Rank: 126th
- Demonym: Korbites
- Time zone: UTC+5:30 (IST)
- PIN: 495677 (Korba)
- Area code: 7759
- Vehicle registration: CG-12
- Sex ratio: 927 ♂/♀
- Website: www.korba.gov.in

Korba is a city and an industrial area in Korba District in the Indian state of Chhattisgarh. Korba was part of Bilaspur District before 25 May 1998. It was later designated as a separate district for ease of administration, but is still under Bilaspur Division.

== Climate ==
Korba has been ranked 13th best “National Clean Air City” under (Category 2 3-10L Population cities) in India according to 'Swachh Vayu Survekshan 2024 Results'

== Economy ==
Korba Super Thermal Power Plant of NTPC is located at Jamanipali area. It receives coal from Gevra and Kusmunda mines and source of water for the power plant is Hasdeo River. Korba Thermal Power Station is owned and operated by National Thermal Power Corporation. There are more small Power Plant near city like Hasdeo Thermal Power Station, Dr Shyama Prasad Mukharjee Thermal Power Station and Lanco Amarkantak Power Plant.

Himadri Speciality Chemical has its manufacturing facility located in Korba. Bharat Aluminium Company has plant which is one of the Asia's largest aluminium production industries. In 2009, chimney under construction by Gannon Dunkerley & Company at the Balco smelter collapsed killing 49 workers and GDCL management have been accused of negligence in the incident.

== Geography ==
Korba is located at 22.35°N 82.68°E. It has an average elevation of 252 m (827 ft). As of 2011 India census, Korba city had a population of 365,253. Korba City is a part of the Korba District which was formed on 25 May 1998. The forest area cover of Korba is 4,187.375 km^{2} (1,616.755 sq mi). There are 17 police stations in Korba and it contains five blocks.

== Government and jurisdiction ==
Korba is headquarter of Korba district. Korba City has been a metropolitan municipality with a mayor-council form of government.

Korba (Lok Sabha constituency) is a Lok Sabha parliamentary constituency for the city and constituency is composed of the following assembly segments: Rampur (ST) (assembly constituency no. 20), Korba (assembly constituency no. 21), Katghora (assembly constituency no. 22) and Pali-Tanakhar (ST) (assembly constituency no. 23) is part of Korba district. Currently, Jyotsna Charan Das Mahant of Indian National Congress is a member of parliament to the 17th Lok Sabha and Lakhanlal Devangan of Bharatiya Janata Party sitting Member of the Legislative Assembly from Korba (Vidhan Sabha constituency).

== Transport ==
=== Air ===
The nearest airport is Bilaspur Airport, located 100 km (62 mi) southwest from Korba. Previously, the Government of Chhattisgarh was planning to expand and develop the airstrip present within the city premises. However, due to restricted amount of space within the airfield and due to the city's extent, the government has proposed to build a new domestic airport at Baikunthpur, 145 km (90 mi) north of Korba.

=== Rail ===
The nearest railway station Korba railway station, which is connected to Champa, which in turn lies on the Howrah-Nagpur-Mumbai line. The stations come under the South East Central Railway Zone of the Indian Railways. It is also directly connected to Bilaspur, the divisional headquarter of the railway zone.

=== Bus transport ===
Korba is well connected with a bus transport to various cities within and outside the state. Regular bus services are operated by the government and private operators from Korba Bus Station, the main bus station of the city, to cities like Bilaspur, Champa, Ambikapur, Raipur, Raigarh, Jharsuguda, Jamshedpur, Ranchi, Bhubaneswar, Nagpur, among others.

=== Roadways ===
Korba is well connected with the state and neighbouring states with a network of national and state highways. The major highways are National Highway 149B till Champa and National Highway 130 via Bilaspur till Raipur.

== Education ==
=== College ===
- Jyoti Bhushan Pratap Singh Law College, Korba

=== Schools ===
- DAV Public School, Gevra
- DAV Public School, Kusmunda
- Jawahar Navodaya Vidyalaya, Korba

== See also ==
- Satrenga
- Godhi, Korba
- List of cities in Chhattisgarh
- Banki Mongra
