= Korba Airport =

Airport in Korba, Chhattisgarh India

- IATA: none; ICAO: IN-0026

Summary
- Airport type: Private
- Owner: Government of Chhattisgarh
- Operator: Bharat Aluminium Company Limited (BALCO)
- Serves: Korba
- Location: Rumgara, Korba, Chhattisgarh, India
- Coordinates: 22°24′47″N 82°43′10″E

Map
- Location of the airport in Chhattisgarh Korba Airport (India)

Runways
Direction	Length		Surface
Direction	ft	m	Surface
18/36	3,900	1,188	Asphalt

Korba Airport (IATA: none, ICAO: IN-0026) is a private airport located at Korba, in Chhattisgarh, India, and is operated by the Bharat Aluminium Company Limited (BALCO) for transport of cargo and steel from Korba Thermal and Steel Power Plant to other places. The Government of Chhattisgarh intended to expand this airport in order to support passenger traffic by making it a commercial and domestic airport, to facilitate tourism and socio-economic development in the region by promoting employment and connectivity. However, in March 2023, the government discarded the plan to expand this airport due to a heavy restricted amount of space within the airfield and due to the city's extent, and proposed a new plan to develop a new domestic airport at Baikunthpur, which is located 145 km (90 mi) north of Korba.
