= Katghora =

- Town
- Location in Chhattisgarh, India Katghora (India)
- Coordinates: 22.5°N 82.55°E
- Country: India
- State: Chhattisgarh
- District: Korba
- Elevation: 312 m (1,024 ft)

Population (2001)
  - Total: 18,534

Languages
  - Official: Hindi, Chhattisgarhi
- Time zone: UTC+5:30 (IST)
- PIN: 495445
- Vehicle registration: CG

Katghora is a town and a nagar palika in Korba district in the Indian state of Chhattisgarh connecting various states in India through road connectivity.

== Geography ==
Katghora is located at 22.5°N 82.55°E and has an average elevation of 312 metres (1,024 ft). Radhasagar is a lake located in the heart of the city.

Chak-Chakwa mountain is crown of the Katghora city, which is also known as Hanumangarhi.

Katghora Krishi Vigyan Kendra is one of the KVK in Chhattisgarh.

== Transport ==
Katghora is on NH 130 Bilaspur-Ambikapur so it is directly connected to Nyaydhani Bilaspur and Rajdhani Raipur while a state highway connects Katghora to Korba on one side and Amarkantak, Pendra on other side.

Railways will arrive here in the near future after the completion of three projects of industrial rail corridors:

- Korba-Katghora-Parsa-Surajpur
- Korba-Katghora-Pendra Road
- Katghora-Dipka-Chilhati-Gatora-Bilaspur

After completion of these three projects, Katghora will not only become a railway station but will also get the status of 'Katghora junction'.

== Demographics ==
As of 2001 India census, Katghora had a population of 18,534. Males constituted 51% of the population and females 49%. Katghora had an average literacy rate of 62%, higher than the national average of 59.5%: male literacy was 72%, and female literacy was 52%. In Katghora, 15% of the population was under 6 years of age.

== Political history ==
Katghora became a Nagar Palika on 15 August 2014. In 1864 it was formed as British disciplinary unit under Richard Taper. Katghora Taluk was formed in 1912, becoming the center of administrative activities. After independence it was taken as one of the five subdivision of Bilaspur. At that time Korba was formed as sub-tehsil, and thereafter in 1980 Korba separated from Katghora to form a separate tehsil. In 1982, when Katghora was part of Madhya Pradesh, it was given status of Nagar Palika. Makhan Lal Shukla was its first appointed president (from 28.8.1982 to 31.7.1985).

== Education ==
=== Colleges ===
- JBD Arts & Science College, Katghora
- MDP College Katghora,
- College of Agriculture and research station, Katghora (IGKV, Raipur),
