= Chhattisgarh State Power Generation Company =

Government-owned Indian energy company

CSPDCL (formerly CSPGCL)
- Company type: Government-owned Corporation-PSU
- Industry: Electricity generation
- Founded: 2008
- Headquarters: Dangania Raipur, India
- Key people: Shri Shailendra Kumar Shukla Chairman
- Products: Electricity
- Website: http://www.cseb.gov.in/cspgcl/index.htm

Chhattisgarh State Power Distribution Company Limited (formerly Chhattisgarh State Power Generation Company Limited) is the electricity generation company of the Government of Chhattisgarh state in India.

== History ==
Chhattisgarh State Electricity Board was formed in accordance with the Section 5 of the Electricity Supply Act 1948 as per the Notification published in the gazette of the Government of Chhattisgarh dated 15 November 2000. Chhattisgarh State Electricity Board (CSEB) became functional w.e.f. 01.12.2000. Chhattisgarh State Electricity Board has been reorganized into five companies in accordance with the provisions contained in the Section 131-134 of Electricity Act 2003 by the Govt. of Chhattisgarh. Thus Chhattisgarh State Power Distribution Company Limited became functional w.e.f. 01.01.2009.

== Generation capacity ==
The installed capacity as of 31.07.2010 was 1924.7 MW comprising 1786 MW from coal-based thermal and 138.70 MW from hydroelectric power stations. and some 6 MW is coming from co-generation sources.

=== Thermal Power Plants ===
- Hasdeo Thermal Power Station also known as Korba West Thermal Power Station, an 840 MW (4x210 MW) coal-based thermal power plant. Capacity addition of 500 MW is ongoing at the site, this phase is known as Korba West Extension Thermal Power Plant.
- Dr Shyama Prasad Mukharjee Thermal Power Station, a 500 MW (2x250 MW) coal-based thermal power plant.
- Korba Thermal Power Station also known as Korba East Thermal Power Station, a 440 MW (4x50 MW, 2x120 MW) coal-based thermal power plant.

== Capacity addition ==
=== Recent Power Projects ===
- Atal Bihari Vajpayee Thermal Power Station (formerly known as Marwa-Tendubhata Thermal Power Station) - Located in the Janjgir-Champa District a 1000 MW (2x500 MW) thermal power plant (coal based) has been commissioned in March 2016 (Unit-1) and in August 2016 (Unit-2) at Janjgir–Champa district.

=== Future Power Projects ===
There are several planned power projects.
