= Pali, Korba district =

Pali
- village
- 9th century Hindu temple in Pali

- Location in Chhattisgarh, India Pali (India)
- Coordinates: 22.3781°N 82.3207°E
- Country: India
- State: Chhattisgarh
- District: Korba
- Tehsil: Pali

Government
  - Body: Nagar Panchayat

Area
  - Total: 27.304 km^{2} (10.542 sq mi)

Population (2011)
  - Total: 5,514
  - Density: 201.9/km^{2} (523.0/sq mi)
- Time zone: UTC+5:30 (IST)
- Pincode: 495445

Pali is a town in the Korba district of Chhattisgarh, India. It is the headquarters of the Pali tehsil and the Pali community development block.

== History ==
A Shiva temple is located at Pali. Inscriptions attached to this temple suggest that it was built by king Vikramaditya I (r. c. 870–900) of Bana dynasty, and later renovated by Jajalla-deva of the Ratnapura Kalachuri dynasty.

According to the Bilhari stone inscription, the Tripuri Kalachuri king Shankargana II (r. c. 890–910) captured Pali from the lord of Kosala. Historian V. V. Mirashi identifies the defeated king as the Bana king Vikramaditya I.

Until the 2001 census of India, Pali was designated as a village; it was subsequently notified as a Statutory Town.

== Demographics ==
As per the 2011 census of India, the area administered under the Pali Nagar Panchayat had 1,194 households with a population of 5,514, including an equal number of men and women. The effective literacy rate (the percentage of literate persons among the population aged 7 years and above) was 87.15%. The population included 352 Scheduled Caste (SC) persons and 830 Scheduled Tribe (ST) persons.

As per the 2011 census, the Pali tehsil has 141 villages, with a total population of 193,232. The Pali community development block is the most pouplated block in the Korba district, with a population of 193,232.

== See also ==
- Pali-Tanakhar Assembly constituency
