= Chirmiri =

Chirimiri
- Municipal Corporation
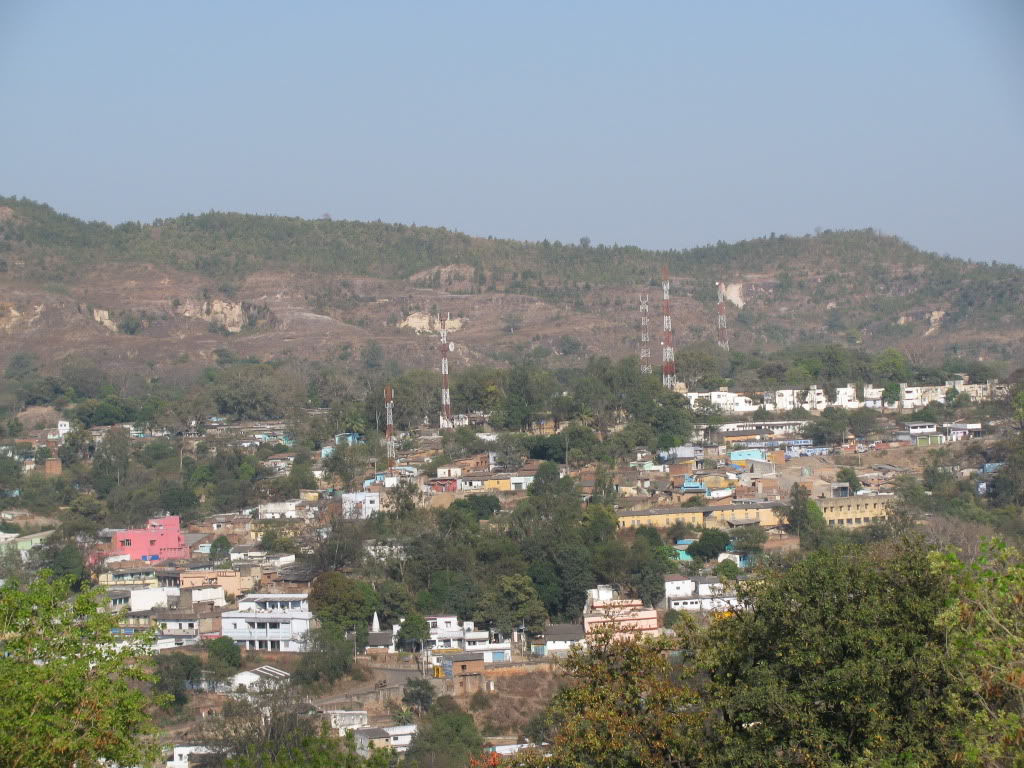
- Chirimiri

- Location in Chhattisgarh, India
- Coordinates: 23°11′30″N 82°21′15″E
- Country: India
- State: Chhattisgarh
- District: Manendragarh-Chirmiri-Bharatpur
- Established: 1993

Government
  - Body: Municipal Corporation Chirmiri
  - Mayor: Ram Naresh Rai (BJP)

Population (2011)
  - Total: 85,317

Languages
  - Official: Hindi; Chhattisgarhi
- Time zone: UTC+5:30 (IST)
- PIN: 497451, 497449, 497773
- Telephone code: 07771
- Vehicle registration: CG32

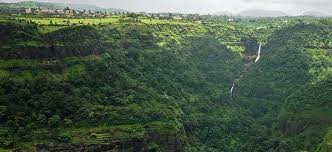
chirmiri

Chirmiri is a hill station city and a Municipal Corporation in the Manendragarh-Chirmiri-Bharatpur district in the Indian state of Chhattisgarh. It was a part of Koriya district until 15 August 2021 when the separate Manendragarh-Chirmiri-Bharatpur district was created. It is famously known for its coal extraction as the area is rich in coal.

Chirmiri, secured the top position in the Swacch Survekshan 2022 rankings for the '50,000-1 lakh' population category in the Eastern zone. The city was given the award for 'Fastest mover' city under the same category during Swacchh Survekshan 2020. For the 2022 Survekshan, Chirmiri scored 100% under categories like Waste generation vs processing, Remediation of Dumpsites, Cleanliness of Residential Areas, Cleanliness of Market Areas, Cleanliness Of Drains, and Cleanliness of Water Bodies.

Chirimiri is referred to as the ‘Heaven/Jannat of Chhattisgarh’. The lush greenery, mountains and rivers make it a perfect getaway destination for anyone looking to relax. This scenic town is also known for its coal mines. There are several temples and other notable places that are famous among tourists. Chirimiri is well connected to major cities via rail and road. Chirimiri is situated at an altitude of 579 m above sea level. It lies along the bank of Hasdeo River. The river is one of the most prominent tributaries of the Mahanadi River. The weather is pleasant all year round, and there are dense forests in the region which houses exotic flora and fauna.

== Geography ==
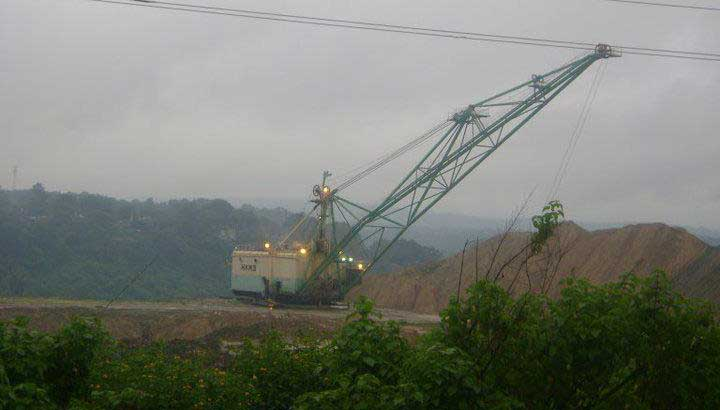
Coal Drag Line

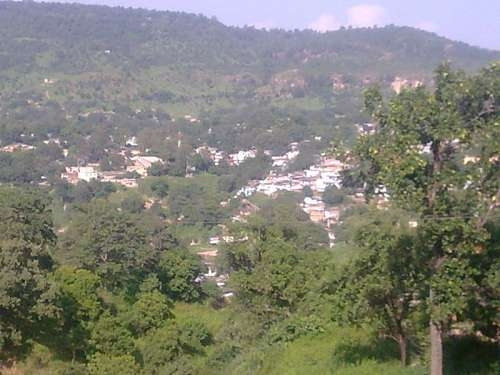
Hill station

Chirmiri city is located in the geographical coordinates of 23 degrees 11 minutes and 60 seconds north latitude and 82 degrees 20 minutes and 60 seconds east longitude. The total population of the city stands at 93,366 people. The total population is segmented into 49,128 males and 44,238 females. The town has achieved a high literacy rate with 61,280 total literates in the town. The number of male literates is more than the female literates in the town. As compared to the female literate count of 24,640, the number of male literates is 36,640.

Chirmiri is rich in the coal deposits found in the region. The coal industrial belt has developed in the region owing to the close proximity of the coal mines. The most reputed government undertaking and the largest coal producing industry in India, the South Eastern Coalfields Limited is located in the region. Chirmiri is one of the 13 administrative areas of the coal industry.

One of the chief tourist attractions of the region is the Lord Jagannath Temple that was designed like the temple in Puri in Odisha state. Chirmiri is endowed with beautiful landscape that the tourists may enjoy while journeying to the town.

=== Climate ===
Climate data for Chirmiri
| Month | Jan | Feb | Mar | Apr | May | Jun | Jul | Aug | Sep | Oct | Nov | Dec | Year |
|---|---|---|---|---|---|---|---|---|---|---|---|---|---|
| Mean daily maximum °C (°F) | 23.5 (74.3) | 26.9 (80.4) | 32.0 (89.6) | 38 (100) | 42 (108) | 40 (104) | 29.7 (85.5) | 29.3 (84.7) | 29.8 (85.6) | 29.4 (84.9) | 26.5 (79.7) | 23.7 (74.7) | 30.9 (87.6) |
| Mean daily minimum °C (°F) | 8.7 (47.7) | 11.4 (52.5) | 15.7 (60.3) | 20.9 (69.6) | 24.7 (76.5) | 24.8 (76.6) | 23.2 (73.8) | 22.9 (73.2) | 22.1 (71.8) | 18.1 (64.6) | 12.2 (54.0) | 8.5 (47.3) | 17.8 (64.0) |
| Average rainfall mm (inches) | 22.8 (0.90) | 22.7 (0.89) | 24.7 (0.97) | 13.4 (0.53) | 19.4 (0.76) | 212.4 (8.36) | 428.0 (16.85) | 383.2 (15.09) | 225.4 (8.87) | 55.6 (2.19) | 8.9 (0.35) | 6.3 (0.25) | 1,422.8 (56.01) |
| Average rainy days | 3.1 | 3.7 | 3.4 | 2.8 | 3.3 | 13.4 | 23.3 | 22.5 | 15.4 | 5.3 | 1.0 | 1.2 | 98.4 |
Source: World Meteorological Organization

== History ==
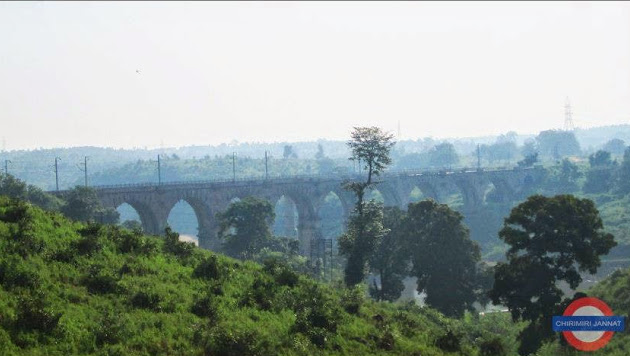
old bridge

At first, it was privately owned coal-mines. Dadu Lehri, as he is lovingly called, is said to be the founder of Chirimiri. Tata Iron and Steel Company then initiated prospecting of coal but no mining was carried out by them. The Chirimiri colliery was opened in 1930 (production started in 1932), New Chirimiri colliery came up in 1942, Pure Chirimiri colliery in 1945, and North Chirimiri colliery in 1946. Subsequently, New Chirimiri Pondi Hills, West Chirimiri, Duman Hill and Korea collieries started operating. Coal production rose from 264,000 tonnes in 1933 to 3,162,500 tonnes in 1980.

The collieries in Chirimiri Coalfield were owned by several companies and owners such as Chirimiri Colliery Company Pvt. Ltd., Dababhoy's New Chirimiri Ponri Hill Company (Private) Limited, United Collieries Limited, K.N. Dhady and Indra Singh & Sons (Private) Limited. These were nationalized in 1973.

== Economy ==
Chirmiri is well known for its coal mines (see Chirimiri Coalfield). Mining began here in 1925. Chirmiri has a railway station that is used primarily to transport coal from the region. The coal industrial belt has developed in the region owing to the close proximity to the coal mines. The largest coal producing industry in India, the South Eastern Coalfields Limited is located in the region. Chirmiri is one of the 13 administrative areas of the coal industry.

== Local Government ==
As per the Census 2011, Chirmiri was a Class-II town which had been granted the status of Municipal Corporation by the Chhattisgarh Government in 2008. The town is divided into 40 wards and nine zones and these nine zones are physically separated from each other by hilly mounts and forested areas. Chirmiri was part of the Koriya district until 2022, when the Manendragarh-Chirmiri Bharatpur (MCB) district was established.

== Demographics ==
As of 2001 India census, Chirmiri had a population of 91,312, 53% male and 46% female. Chirmiri has an average literacy rate of 66% (male 75%, female 56%), higher than the national average of 59.5%. Fourteen per cent (14%) of the population is under six years of age.

== Notable places ==
For the pilgrims, Chirimiri and places nearby offers temples like:

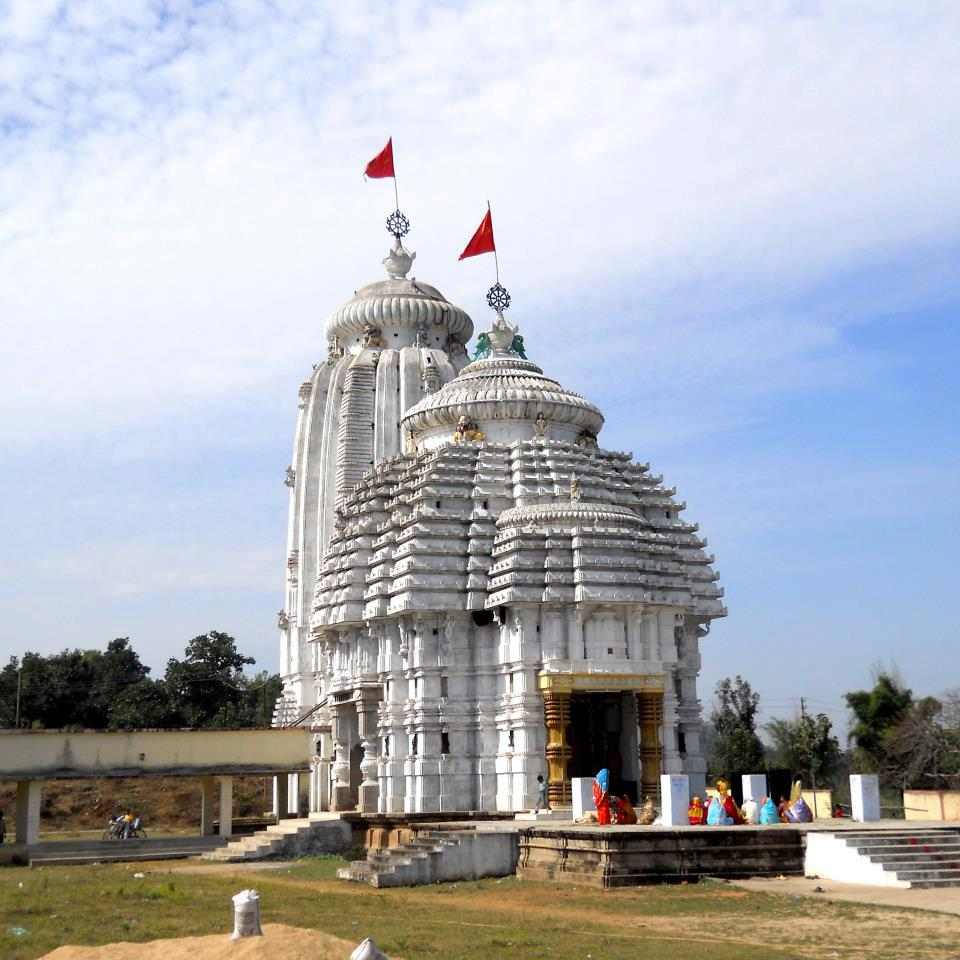
lord jaganth tample

The Lord Jagannath Temple: This temple was built by the workers from Puri and is the replica of the Puri Jagannath Temple. This temple is a gift to Chirimiri by the Odia community of this region, who put their immense effort to make it a reality.

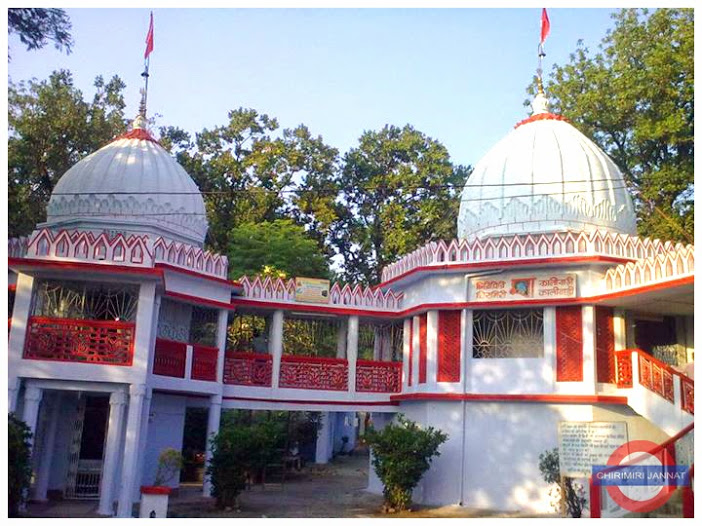
kalibadi temple

Kalibadi: The temple is in Haldibadi. It is on a hill and only 1 km. from the main station.

Baigapara: is in the place called Bartunga and also Sati temple which is a very old temple in Bartunga dedicated to Sati maa.

Gufa Mandir: Located in Godaripara

Maha Maya Temple in Ratanpur: It is one of the 52 Shakthi Peeths, in India. The temple is dedicated to the deities Goddess Lakshmi and Goddess Saraswathi. The temple was built by the Kalachuri king Ratnadeva in the 12-13th century. The architecture is of the Nagara art, facing north with a big water tank. There is a Shiva and Hanuman temple on the premises. There is a temple dedicated to Kantideval, the oldest temple, built in 1039 said to be constructed by an ascetic known as Santhosh Giri. The temple is guarded by Kalabhairava residing in another temple on the approach road. There are ruins of an 11th-century Kadaeideol Shiva temple on a hill top near a fort.

Amrit Dhara Falls are in Barbaspur. The distance from Chirimiri is about 17 km. There is a famous Shiva temple in Sidh Baba mount, near the water falls. Apart from being a famous water fall, the place is used for picnics by the locals.

Hasdeo River: The local authority has developed the banks of the river and now this is a preferred picnic spot.
