= Hasdeo River =

Coordinates: 21.7234°N 82.7698°E

River Hasdeo

Location
- Country: India
- State: Chhattisgarh
- District: Manendragarh; Koriya; Korba; Janjgir–Champa
- City: Manendragarh; Korba; Champa

Physical characteristics
- Source: Kaimur Hill (Devgarh pahadi)
  - location: Sonhat, Manendragarh, Chhattisgarh, India
- Mouth: Shiladehi (Birra)
  - location: Janjgir–Champa, Chhattisgarh, India
- Length: 333 km (207 mi)

Basin features
- Tributaries
  - left: Ahiran River, Tan River

Hasdeo River is the largest tributary of the Mahanadi River. The river flows in the state of Chhattisgarh. It joins the Mahanadi River near Shiladehi(Birra), a village in Janjgir-Champa district. Minimata Dam, which is commonly known as Hasdeo Bango Dam, is constructed across this river near Bango village. The river originates about 910.0 m (2,985.6 feet) above sea level, in a place about 10.0 km (6.2 miles) from Sonhat in Koriya district. The total length of the river is 333.0 km (206.9 miles), and drainage area is 9856 km^{2}. The major tributary of Hasdeo River is Gej River and other tributary rivers are the Taan, Ooteng, Chornai, and Jhing. The river flows through the Hasdeo Arand forest.

== See also ==
- Amritdhara falls
- Chirmiri
- Tourism in Chhattisgarh
