= Korba district =

Coordinates: 22°21′N 82°41′E

- District of Chhattisgarh
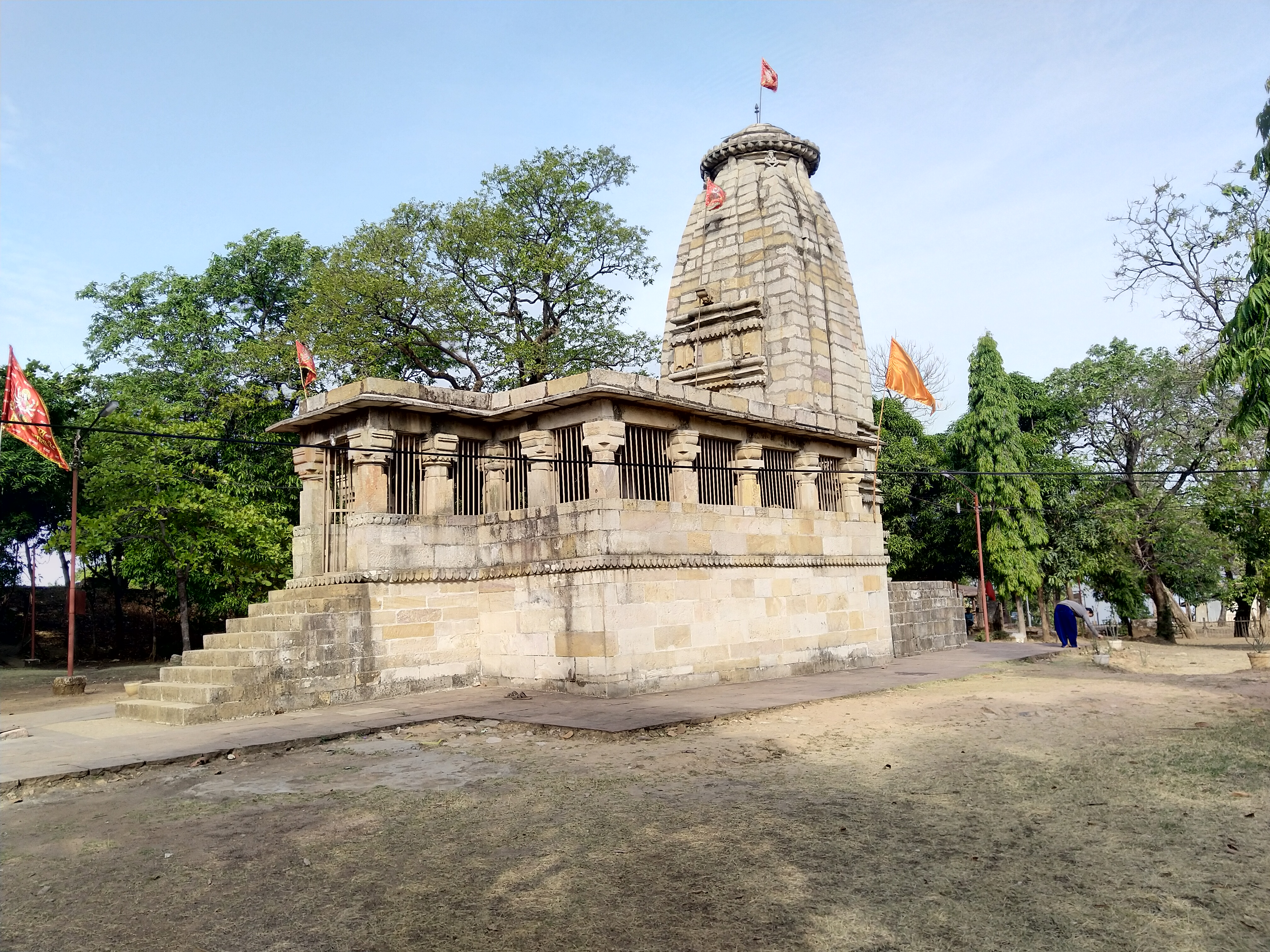
- Mahishasur Mardini Temple, Chaiturgarh
- Interactive map of Korba district
- Country: India
- State: Chhattisgarh
- Division: Bilaspur
- Headquarters: Korba

Area
  - Total: 6,598 km^{2} (2,548 sq mi)

Population (2011)
  - Total: 1,206,640
  - Density: 182.9/km^{2} (473.7/sq mi)

Demographics
  - Literacy: 73.22 per cent
- Time zone: UTC+05:30 (IST)
- Website: korba.gov.in

Korba district is an administrative district of Chhattisgarh state in central India. The headquarter of this district is Korba. It is the Largest District (By Area) in the state.

== History ==
The district is named for the Korwa tribe that inhabits the northern part of Chhattisgarh.

Korba was formerly known as Gourigarh. The district was originally ruled by the Haihaiyas until it was conquered by the Marathas during their expansion into Chhattisgarh. Various parts of the district were controlled by small zamindars belonging to a variety of communities such as Gond and Kanwar. The Korwas managed to overthrow the rulers of Gourigarh and ruled the region until being displaced by the Rajputs under Ratan Singh. These rulers managed to retain their lands during the arrival of the Marathas and the British. In 1861, Korba became part of the newly formed Bilaspur District.

== Geography ==
The district is situated in the Northern part of the state, at the point where the Chhattisgarh plain meets the Surguja plateau. The southern part of the district is the northern end of the Chhattisgarh plain. In the west, these plains meet an extension of the Maikal Hills that separate the lowlands from the plateau. In the east is located the Deopahadi Range. These heavily forested hills are divided by the valley of the Hasdeo River. The area's most important hill is Karela Hill with a height of 3,253 feet (992 m). To the north of Katghora, the slope of the valleys of the Hasdeo and Gage is very less and joins the Surguja District in the north. The Tan and Chorai rivers joins the Hasdeo river from opposite directions, from the east and the west. Towards the northern banks are the Gurudwari Hill, Janta Hill, Matin and Dhajag Hills.

Korba is known for its coal mines such as Gevra Area (one of the biggest coal mines of Asia), Kusmunda Area and Dipka Area (SECL parent company - Coal India) all located in Korba Coalfield. It also has power plants such as NTPC, CSEB, and BALCO.

== Demographics ==
Historical population
Year	Pop.	±% p.a.
1901	145,943	—
1911	184,445	+2.37%
1921	198,660	+0.75%
1931	226,221	+1.31%
1941	254,687	+1.19%
1951	275,899	+0.80%
1961	333,438	+1.91%
1971	429,943	+2.57%
1981	612,561	+3.60%
1991	825,891	+3.03%
2001	1,011,823	+2.05%
2011	1,206,640	+1.78%

Religions in Korba district (2011)
Religion	Percent
Hinduism	93.91%
Islam	2.50%
Christianity	1.75%
Other (tribal religion)	1.30%
Other or not stated	0.54%

According to the 2011 census, Korba district has a population of 1,206,640, roughly equal to the nation of Bahrain or the US state of New Hampshire out of which 612,915 are male and 593,725 are female. This gives it a ranking of 395th in India (out of a total of 640). The district has a population density of 183 inhabitants per square kilometre (470/sq mi). Its population growth rate over the decade 2001-2011 was 19.25%. Korba has a sex ratio of 971 females for every 1000 males, and a literacy rate of 73.22%. 36.99% of the population lives in urban areas. Scheduled Castes and Scheduled Tribes made up 10.33% and 40.90% of the population respectively. Most of the people can speak and understand hindi there. It is widely spoken by peoples.

Languages of Korba district (2011)
1. Chhattisgarhi (82.7%)
2. Hindi (11.6%)
3. Kurukh (1.00%)
4. Bhojpuri (0.94%)
5. Bengali (0.61%)
6. Odia (0.41%)
7. Others (2.75%)

At the time of the 2011 Census of India, 82.68% of the population in the district spoke Chhattisgarhi, 11.61% Hindi, 1.00% Kurukh 0.94% Bhojpuri, 0.61% Bengali and 0.41% Odia as their first language.

== Culture ==
The district is known for its tribal culture. The largest tribes are the Gonds and Kawars, with smaller numbers of Kurukh, Binjhwar, Dhanwar and Majhwar.

Korba is famous for its cultural diversity. The people celebrate all the festivals with great enthusiasm.

Mainly Pahari Korva and Birhore tribes are major tribe community of district. They generally habitual of living in isolation. They live in hilly and forest areas.

The main tribal festival are Dev Uthani, Pola, Chherchhera, Karma, and Hareli.

Hareli is celebrated during the month of monsoon. Farmers celebrate this festival, it is also known as Hariyali.

Pola is another festival celebrated by peoples, During the festival clay made bullocks are worshiped.

Panthi Dance, Raut Nacha, Karma Nacha, Baar Nacha, and Suwa are the traditional dances of the SURAJ KUMAR SAHU district.

== See also ==
- Banki Mongra
