= Mahasamund Lok Sabha constituency =

Lok Sabha Constituency in Chhattisgarh, India

Coordinates: 21.1°N 82.1°E

Mahasamund CG-06
- Lok Sabha constituency

Constituency details
- Country: India
- Region: Central India
- State: Chhattisgarh
- Assembly constituencies: Saraipali; Basna; Khallari; Mahasamund; Rajim; Bindrawagarh; Kurud; Dhamtari
- Established: 1952
- Total electors: 17,62,477
- Reservation: None

Member of Parliament
- 18th Lok Sabha
- Incumbent Rupkumari Choudhary
- Party: Bharatiya Janata Party
- Elected year: 2024

Mahasamund is a Lok Sabha parliamentary constituency in the Indian state of Chhattisgarh.

== Vidhan Sabha segments ==
Mahasamund Lok Sabha constituency (महासमुंद) is composed of the following assembly segments:

#	Name	District	Member	Party	Leading (in 2024)
39	Saraipali (SC)	Mahasamund	Chaturi Nand	INC	BJP
40	Basna	Mahasamund	Sampat Agrawal	BJP	BJP
41	Khallari	Mahasamund	Dwarikadhish Yadav	INC	BJP
42	Mahasamund	Mahasamund	Yogeshwar Raju Sinha	BJP	BJP
54	Rajim	Gariaband	Rohit Sahu	BJP	BJP
55	Bindrawagarh (ST)	Gariaband	Janak Dhruw	INC	BJP
57	Kurud	Dhamtari	Ajay Chandrakar	BJP	BJP
58	Dhamtari	Dhamtari	Onkar Sahu	INC	BJP

== Members of Parliament ==
Year	Member	Party
1952	Sheodas Daga	Indian National Congress
1952^	Maganlal Radhakishan Bagdi	Indian National Congress
1962	Vidya Charan Shukla	Indian National Congress
1964^	Vidya Charan Shukla	Indian National Congress
1967	Vidya Charan Shukla	Indian National Congress
1971	Krishna Agrawal	Indian National Congress
1977	Brij Lal Verma	Janata Party
1980	Vidya Charan Shukla	Indian National Congress (I)
1984	Vidya Charan Shukla	Indian National Congress
1989	Vidya Charan Shukla	Janata Dal
1991	Pawan Diwan	Indian National Congress
1996	Pawan Diwan	Indian National Congress
1998	Chandra Shekhar Sahu	Bharatiya Janata Party
1999	Shyama Charan Shukla	Indian National Congress
2004	Ajit Jogi	Indian National Congress
2009	Chandulal Sahu	Bharatiya Janata Party
2014	Chandulal Sahu	Bharatiya Janata Party
2019	Chunni Lal Sahu	Bharatiya Janata Party
2024	Roop Kumari Choudhary	Bharatiya Janata Party

^ by poll

== General elections results ==
=== 2024 ===
2024 Indian general election: Mahasamund
Party	Candidate	Votes	%	±%
BJP	Roop Kumari Choudhary	703,659	53.06	
INC	Tamradhwaj Sahu	5,58,203	42.09	
BSP	Basant Sinha	8,806	0.67	
NOTA	None of the above	3,840	0.29	
Majority		1,45,456	10.97	
Turnout		13,26,441	75.21	▲0.56
BJP hold		Swing		

=== 2019 Lok Sabha Elections ===
2019 Indian general elections: Mahasamund
Party	Candidate	Votes	%	±%
BJP	Chunni Lal Sahu	616,580	50.44	▲5.93
INC	Dhanendra Sahu	5,26,069	43.06	▼1.34
NOTA	None of the above	21,241	1.74	N/A
IND.	Devendar Singh Thakur (Rajput)	15,491	1.27	N/A
BSP	Dhansing Kosariya	11,245	0.92	N/A
Majority		90,511	7.40	▲7.29
Turnout		12,22,767	74.65	▲0.04
BJP hold		Swing		

=== General elections 2014 ===
2014 Indian general elections: Mahasamund
Party	Candidate	Votes	%	±%
BJP	Chandulal Sahu	503,514	44.51	▼3.30
INC	Ajit Jogi	5,02,297	44.40	▼3.22
IND.	Chandulal Sahu	20,255	1.79	N/A
Majority		1,217	0.11	▼6.52
Turnout		11,31,254	74.61	▲17.92
BJP hold		Swing		

=== General elections 2009 ===
2009 Indian general elections: Mahasamund
Party	Candidate	Votes	%	±%
BJP	Chandulal Sahu	371,201	47.81	
INC	Motilal Sahu	3,19,726	41.18	
IND.	Sultansingh Satnam	18,998	2.45	
IND.	Ramprasad Chauhan	15,573	2.01	
Majority		51,475	6.63	
Turnout		7,76,217	56.69	
BJP hold		Swing		

=== 1977 Lok Sabha Elections ===
- Brijlal Verma (BLD / Janata Party) : 182,054 votes
- Shrikrishna Agrawal (INC): 102,527

== See also ==
- Mahasamund
- List of constituencies of the Lok Sabha
