= Pithora, Chhattisgarh =

Pithora
- town
- Location in Chhattisgarh, India Pithora (India)
- Coordinates: 21.27°N 82.52°E
- Country: India
- State: Chhattisgarh
- District: Mahasamund

Government
  - Body: Pithora Nagar Panchayat
- Elevation: 304 m (997 ft)

Population (2011)
  - Total: 17,640

Languages
  - Official: Hindi, Chhattisgarhi, Odia
- Time zone: UTC+5:30 (IST)
- PIN: 493551
- Vehicle registration: CG 06

Pithora is a town, a Nagar Panchayat and a Tehsil in Mahasamund district of Chhattisgarh, India.

== Geography ==
Pithora is located at 21.27°N 82.52°E. It has an average elevation of 304 metres (997 feet).

Pithora is 50 km North to the District Headquarter Mahasamund on National Highway 53 (formerly National Highway 6).

== Demographics ==
As of 2001 India census, Pithora had a population of 7929. Males constitute 50% of the population and females 50%. Pithora has an average literacy rate of 68%, higher than the national average of 59.5%: male literacy is 75%, and female literacy is 60%. In Pithora, 14% of the population is under 6 years of age.

== Transport ==
Pithora is situated on four-lane National Highway 53 and direct connected to Mahasamund, Raipur, Saraipali, Sarangarh, Kasdol through roadways. Frequent bus service is available at day time from Pithora Bus Stand for Raipur, Mahasamund, Bagbahara & Saraipali. It is a little bit difficult to avail a bus from Pithora after 8:00 p.m.

Nearest railway stations are Bagbahara and Mahasamund.

== Culture ==
Pithora has population of all major religion Hindu, Muslim, Sikh and Christian. All festivals are celebrated and enjoyed equally. Holi, Deepawali, Eid, Ramadan, Nanak Jayanti, Christmas, Navaratri and Ganeshotshav are major festivals observed here. Pithora is a small town but it is quite multicultural and cosmopolitan in its orientation. Apart from Chhattisgarhi and Hindi, languages like Panjabi, Odia, Haryanvi are being spoken here. Raut and Suva Nach (tribal dance) is very famous during Deepawali every year.
