= Yogeshwar Raju Sinha =

Indian politician (born 1980)

Member of the Chhattisgarh Legislative Assembly
- Incumbent
- Assumed office 3 December 2023
- Preceded by: Vinod Sevan Lal Chandrakar
- Constituency: Mahasamund

Personal details
- Party: Bharatiya Janata Party
- Parent: Nandu Ram Sinha (father)
- Education: Dr. C.V. Raman University

Yogeshwar Raju Sinha (born 1980) is an Indian politician from Chhattisgarh. He is an MLA from Mahasamund Assembly constituency in Mahasamund district. He won the 2023 Chhattisgarh Legislative Assembly election, representing the Bharatiya Janata Party.

== Early life and education ==
Raju is from Mahasamund, Chhattisgarh. His father, Nandu Ram Sinha, is a farmer. He completed his graduation in arts through open stream at Institute of Open and Distance Education which is affiliated with Dr CV Raman University, Bilaspur in 2017.

== Career ==
Raju won from Mahasamund Assembly constituency representing the Bharatiya Janata Party in the 2023 Chhattisgarh Legislative Assembly election. He polled 84,594 votes and defeated his nearest rival, Rashmi Chandrakar of the Indian National Congress, by a margin of 16,152 votes.
