= Mahasamund Assembly constituency =

Legislative Assembly constituency in Chhattisgarh State, India

Coordinates: 21.11°N 82.09°E

Mahasamund
- Constituency No. 42 for the Chhattisgarh Legislative Assembly

Constituency details
- Country: India
- Region: Central India
- State: Chhattisgarh
- District: Mahasamund
- Lok Sabha constituency: Mahasamund
- Total electors: 208,801
- Reservation: None

Member of Legislative Assembly
- 6th Chhattisgarh Legislative Assembly
- Incumbent Yogeshwar Raju Sinha
- Party: Bharatiya Janata Party
- Elected year: 2023

Mahasamund is one of the 90 Legislative Assembly constituencies of Chhattisgarh state in India. It is in Mahasamund district and is a part of Mahasamund Lok Sabha constituency.

Previously, Mahasamund was part of Madhya Pradesh Legislative Assembly, until the state of Chhattisgarh was created in 2000.

== Members of Vidhan Sabha ==
Election	Name	Party
Madhya Pradesh Legislative Assembly
1952	Ajodhya Prasad	Indian National Congress
1957	Miri Bajirao	Indian National Congress
1957	Nemichand Jain	Indian National Congress
1962	Paran	Praja Socialist Party
1967	Nemichand Jain	Indian National Congress
1972	Purushottamlal K. Dhaluram	Samyukta Socialist Party
1977	Muhammad Yaqub	Janata Party
1980	Maksudan Lal Chandrakar	Indian National Congress
1985	Maksudan Lal Chandrakar	Indian National Congress
1990	Santosh Kumar	Janata Dal
1993	Agni Chandrakar	Indian National Congress
1998	Agni Chandrakar	Indian National Congress
Chhattisgarh Legislative Assembly
2003	Poonam Chandrakar	Bharatiya Janata Party
2008	Agni Chandrakar	Indian National Congress
2013	Vimal Chopra	Independent politician
2018	Vinod Sevan Lal Chandrakar	Indian National Congress
2023	Yogeshwar Raju Sinha	Bharatiya Janata Party

== Election results ==
=== 2023 ===
Chhattisgarh Legislative Assembly Election, 2023: Mahasamund
Party	Candidate	Votes	%	±%
BJP	Yogeshwar Raju Sinha	84,594	51.41	+34.41
INC	Rashmi Chandrakar	68,442	41.60	+9.69
JCC	Ashwant Tusshar Sahu	1,735	1.05	−15.01
NOTA	None of the Above	391	0.24	−1.11
Majority		36,793	19.53	+4.62
Turnout		164,542	78.80	−2.17
BJP gain from INC		Swing		

=== 2018 ===
Chhattisgarh Legislative Assembly Election, 2018: Mahasamund
Party	Candidate	Votes	%	±%
INC	Vinod Sevan Lal Chandrakar	49,356	31.91	
BJP	Poonam Chandrakar	26,290	17.00	
JCC	Tribhuvan Mahilang	24,839	16.06	
Independent	Manoj Kant Sahu	21,911	14.17	
Independent	Vimal Chopra	21,160	13.68	
Independent	T. K. Dadsena	1,552	1.00	
Independent	Pankaj Sahu	1,445	0.93	
NOTA	None of the Above	2,085	1.35	
Majority		23,066	14.91	
Turnout		154,679	80.97	
INC gain from Independent		Swing		

== See also ==
- Mahasamund district
- List of constituencies of Chhattisgarh Legislative Assembly
