= Dwarikadhish Yadav =

Indian politician

Member of Chhattisgarh Legislative Assembly
- Incumbent
- Assumed office 3 December 2023
- Constituency: Khallari

Member of Chhattisgarh Legislative Assembly
- In office 2018–2023
- Preceded by: Chunni Lal Sahu

Khallari

Personal details
- Born: 15 August 1973 (age 53) Futguna Village - Mahasamund district
- Party: Indian National Congress
- Education: Higher Sec. School Bhatapara, Raipur
- Profession: Agricultural

Dwarikadhish Yadav is an Indian Politician from the Indian National Congress. He is a member of the Chhattisgarh Legislative Assembly representing the Khallari Assembly constituency for the second consecutive time.

Yadav has also served as a Parliamentary Secretary in Government of Chhattisgarh with attached portfolio of School Education, Primitive Caste and Scheduled Caste Development, Backward Classes and Minority development.

== Career ==
Yadav was first elected to Chhattisgarh Legislative Assembly in 2018 from Khallari Assembly constituency by defeating his BJP rival Monika Dilip Sahu by a margin of 56,978. In 2023 Chhattisgarh Legislative Assembly election, he again won from Khallari constituency by a margin of 37,119 votes against the BJP candidate Alka Chandrakar.

== Election results ==
=== 2023 ===
2023 Chhattisgarh Legislative Assembly election: Khallari
Party	Candidate	Votes	%	±%
INC	Dwarikadhish Yadav	104,052	57.86	−0.11
BJP	Alka Chandrakar	66,933	37.22	+13.62
Independent	Santosh Darachand Banjare	2,187	1.22	
NOTA	None of the Above	2,095	1.16	+0.86
Majority		37,119	20.64	−13.73
Turnout		179,833	82.72	−0.52
INC hold		Swing		

=== 2018 ===
Chhattisgarh Legislative Assembly Election, 2018: Khallari
Party	Candidate	Votes	%	±%
INC	Dwarikadhish Yadav	96,108	57.97	
BJP	Monika Dilip Sahu	39,130	23.60	
JCC	Paresh Baghabara	12,649	7.63	
Independent	Bheklal Sahu	5,228	3.15	
NCP	Basanta Thakur	2,972	1.79	
NOTA	None of the Above	499	0.30	
Majority		56,978	34.37	
Turnout		165,799	83.24	
INC gain from BJP		Swing		
