= Basna Assembly constituency =

Legislative Assembly constituency in Chhattisgarh State, India

Coordinates: 21.28°N 82.82°E

Basna
- Constituency No. 40 for the Chhattisgarh Legislative Assembly

Constituency details
- Country: India
- Region: Central India
- State: Chhattisgarh
- District: Mahasamund
- Lok Sabha constituency: Mahasamund
- Established: 2003
- Total electors: 224,581
- Reservation: None

Member of Legislative Assembly
- 6th Chhattisgarh Legislative Assembly
- Incumbent Sampat Agrawal
- Party: Bharatiya Janata Party
- Elected year: 2023

Basna is one of the 90 Legislative Assembly constituencies of Chhattisgarh state in India.

It is part of Mahasamund district.

== Members of Legislative assembly ==
Election	Name	Party
Madhya Pradesh Legislative Assembly
1952	Jaideo Gadadhar	Indian National Congress
1957	Rajkumar Birendra Bahadur Singh	Independent politician
1962	Abdul Hamid Dani	Indian National Congress
1967	K. M. Bahadur Singh	Indian National Congress
1972	Laxman Jaideo	Indian National Congress
1977	Birendra Bahadur Singh Lal Bahadur	Indian National Congress
1980	Mahendra Bahadur Singh	Indian National Congress
1985	Mahendra Bahadur Singh	Indian National Congress
1990	Laxman Jaydev Satpathi	Janata Dal
1993	Mahendra Bahadur Singh	Independent politician
1998	Mahendra Bahadur Singh	Indian National Congress
Chhattisgarh Legislative Assembly
2003	Dr. Trivikram Bhoi	Bharatiya Janata Party
2008	Devendra Bahadur Singh	Indian National Congress
2013	Rupkumari Choudhary	Bharatiya Janata Party
2018	Devendra Bahadur Singh	Indian National Congress
2023	Sampat Agrawal	Bharatiya Janata Party

== Election results ==
=== 2023 ===
Chhattisgarh Legislative Assembly Election, 2023: Basna
Party	Candidate	Votes	%	±%
BJP	Sampat Agrawal	108,871	57.80	+37.05
INC	Devendra Bahadur Singh	72,078	38.27	−0.23
NOTA	None of the Above	1,443	0.77	−0.62
Majority		36,793	19.53	+9.55
Turnout		188,342	83.86	−2.05
BJP gain from INC		Swing		

=== 2018 ===
Chhattisgarh Legislative Assembly Election, 2018: Basna
Party	Candidate	Votes	%	±%
INC	Devendra Bahadur Singh	67,535	38.50	
Independent	Sampat Agrawal	50,027	28.52	
BJP	Durgacharan Patel	36,394	20.75	
JCC	Trilochan Nayak Lungiwala	7,758	4.42	
Independent	Anamika Paul	2,475	1.41	
Independent	Mahendra Sao	2,123	1.21	
NDPF	Kaleshwar Yadav	1,753	1.00	
NOTA	None of the Above	2,431	1.39	
Majority		17,508	9.98	
Turnout		175,405	85.91	
INC gain from BJP		Swing		

== See also ==
- List of constituencies of the Chhattisgarh Legislative Assembly
- Mahasamund district
