= Chunni Lal Sahu =

Indian politician (born 1968)

Member of Parliament, Lok Sabha
- In office 23 May 2019 – 4 June 2024
- Preceded by: Chandu Lal Sahu
- Succeeded by: Rupkumari Choudhary
- Constituency: Mahasamund, Chhattisgarh

Member of Chhattisgarh Legislative Assembly
- In office 9 December 2013 – 11 December 2018
- Preceded by: Paresh Bagbahara
- Succeeded by: Dwarikadhish Yadav
- Constituency: Khallari

Personal details
- Born: 22 September 1968 (age 57) Mongrapali, Mahasamund, Madhya Pradesh, India (now in Chhattisgarh, India)
- Party: Bharatiya Janata party
- Spouse: Seema Sahu
- Children: 1 son & 1 daughter
- Parent: Sukhram Sahu (father)
- Profession: Politician, agriculture

Chunni Lal Sahu (born 22 August 1968) is an Indian politician. He was elected to the Lok Sabha, lower house of the Parliament of India from Mahasamund, Chhattisgarh in the 2019 Indian general election as member of the Bharatiya Janata Party.

Lok Sabha
Preceded by Chandu Lal Sahu	Member of Parliament for Mahasamund; 2019 – 2024	Succeeded by Rupkumari Choudhary
