= Barnawapara Wildlife Sanctuary =

Indian wildlife sanctuary

- IUCN category IV (habitat/species management area)
- Location within Chhattisgarh Location within India
- Interactive map of Barnawapara Wildlife Sanctuary
- Location: Mahasamund district, Chhattisgarh
- Nearest city: Mahasamund
- Coordinates: 21°24′00″N 82°27′50″E
- Area: 245 km^{2} (95 sq mi)
- Established: 1976
- Website: bwsanctuary.com

The Barnawapara Wildlife Sanctuary is located in Mahasamund district. It was established in 1976 under the Wildlife Protection Act.

== Name ==
The Barnawapara Wildlife Sanctuary is named after the twin forest villages of Bar and Nawapara located in the sanctuary.

== Geography ==
The sanctuary is spread over an area of about 245 square km. The Jonk River, a tributary of the Mahanadi river, flows through the sanctuary, and is bisected by a number other of streams and rivulets, besides numerous watering holes. The tributaries of Mahanadi are the source of water here. Balamdehi River forms the western boundary and Jonk River forms the north-eastern boundary of the Sanctuary. It is a land mass of undulating terrain dotted with numerous low and high hillocks.

== Flora ==
The sanctuary is full with Tropical Dry Deciduous Forests and Bamboo is amongst the most commonly spotted tree here. Sal, Mahua, Semal, Tendu Ber, Teak and other tropical dry deciduous trees like Tendu, Terminalia, Mahua, Ber and Semal trees are also commonly found in the reserve.

== Fauna ==
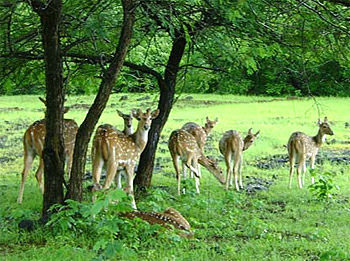
Spotted deer herd

Wildlife of the sanctuary include Tigers, Sloth Bear, Flying Squirrels, Jackals, Four-horned Antelopes, Leopards, Chinkara, Jungle Cat, Barking Deer, Porcupine, Monkey, Bison, Striped Hyena, Wild Dogs, Chital, Sambar, Nilgai, Jackal, Gaur, Muntjac, Wild Boar, Cobra, and Python. In 2020, wild buffalo were imported from Manas National Park for reintroduction in the wild. In 2018, the blackbucks was reintroduced into the sanctuary, at that time the specie was declared locally extinct in the state of Chhattisgarh. In 2025, its population has grown to 190.

The sanctuary also has a large population of birds that include Peacock, Parrots, Bulbul, White-rumped Vultures, Green Avadavat, Lesser Kestrels, Peafowl, Wood Peckers, Racket-tailed Drongos, Egrets, and Herons. Bird watching in Barnawapara is one of the most enjoyed and popular activities.

== Connectivity ==
The reserve is about 100 km from Raipur and about 45 km from Mahasamund city. The nearest airport is the Swami Vivekananda Airport.

== Tourism ==
There are a number of scenic waterfalls in the sanctuary, like Dhaskund waterfall, Siddhakhol Waterfall, Nakuti Darha waterfall, etc. Other places like Turturiya Dham are also popular. It is situated on the northern boundary of the sanctuary besides the Balamdehi river, 13 km from Barnawapara, is believed to have been the abode of Sage Valmiki and the place where Sita lived in exile, and where Luv and Kush were born.
