= Shyama Charan Shukla =

7th Chief Minister of Madhya Pradesh

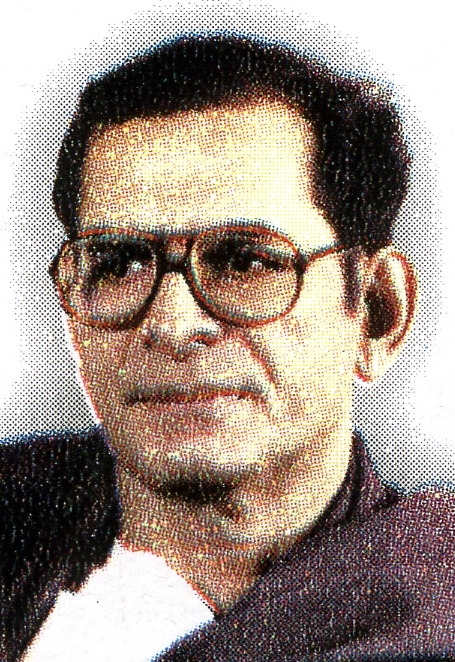
- Shukla on a 2012 stamp of India

7th Chief Minister of Madhya Pradesh
- In office 9 December 1989 – 1 March 1990
- Preceded by: Motilal Vora
- Succeeded by: Sunder Lal Patwa
- In office 23 December 1975 – 30 April 1977
- Preceded by: Prakash Chandra Sethi
- Succeeded by: Kailash Chandra Joshi
- In office 26 March 1969 – 28 January 1972
- Preceded by: Nareshchandra Singh
- Succeeded by: Prakash Chandra Sethi

Member of Parliament, Lok Sabha
- In office 1999 – 2004
- Preceded by: Chandra Shekhar Sahu
- Succeeded by: Ajit Jogi
- Constituency: Mahasamund

Member of Madhya Pradesh Legislative Assembly
- In office 1990 – 1999
- Preceded by: Punit Ram Sahu
- Succeeded by: Amitesh Shukla
- Constituency: Rajim
- In office 1957 – 1977
- Preceded by: Shyamkumari Devi
- Succeeded by: Pawan Diwan
- Constituency: Rajim

Personal details
- Born: 27 February 1925 Raipur, Central Provinces and Berar, British India
- Died: 14 February 2007 (aged 81) Raipur, Chhattisgarh, India
- Party: Indian National Congress (1957-2004)
- Spouse: Padmini Shukla (m. 1949)
- Relations: Vidya Charan Shukla (brother)
- Children: 4 (including Amitesh Shukla)
- Parent: Ravishankar Shukla (father)

Shyama Charan Shukla (27 February 1925 – 14 February 2007) was an Indian National Congress politician and thrice Chief Minister of Madhya Pradesh.

== Personal life ==
Shyama Charan Shukla was born on 27 February 1925 in Raipur into a Kanyakubja Brahmin family. His father Ravishankar Shukla was a lawyer, an Indian National Congress politician from Central Provinces and Berar and the first Chief Minister of Madhya Pradesh. His younger brother, Vidya Charan Shukla, was also an INC politician, a union minister, and a nine-time Member of Parliament in the Lok Sabha.

His son Amitesh Shukla is an INC politician and currently a Member of Legislative Assembly of Chhattisgarh from Rajim.

== Political career ==
Shyama Charan Shukla was first elected as a member of the Madhya Pradesh Legislative Assembly from Rajim in 1957. He was re-elected from the same constituency in 1962, 1967, 1972, 1990, 1993 and 1998. He lost from Rajim in 1977.

Shukla served as the Chief Minister of Madhya Pradesh on three occasions - 1969–72, 1975–77 and 1989–90.

In 1999, he was elected as a Member of Parliament in the Lok Sabha from Mahasamund, and served till 2004.

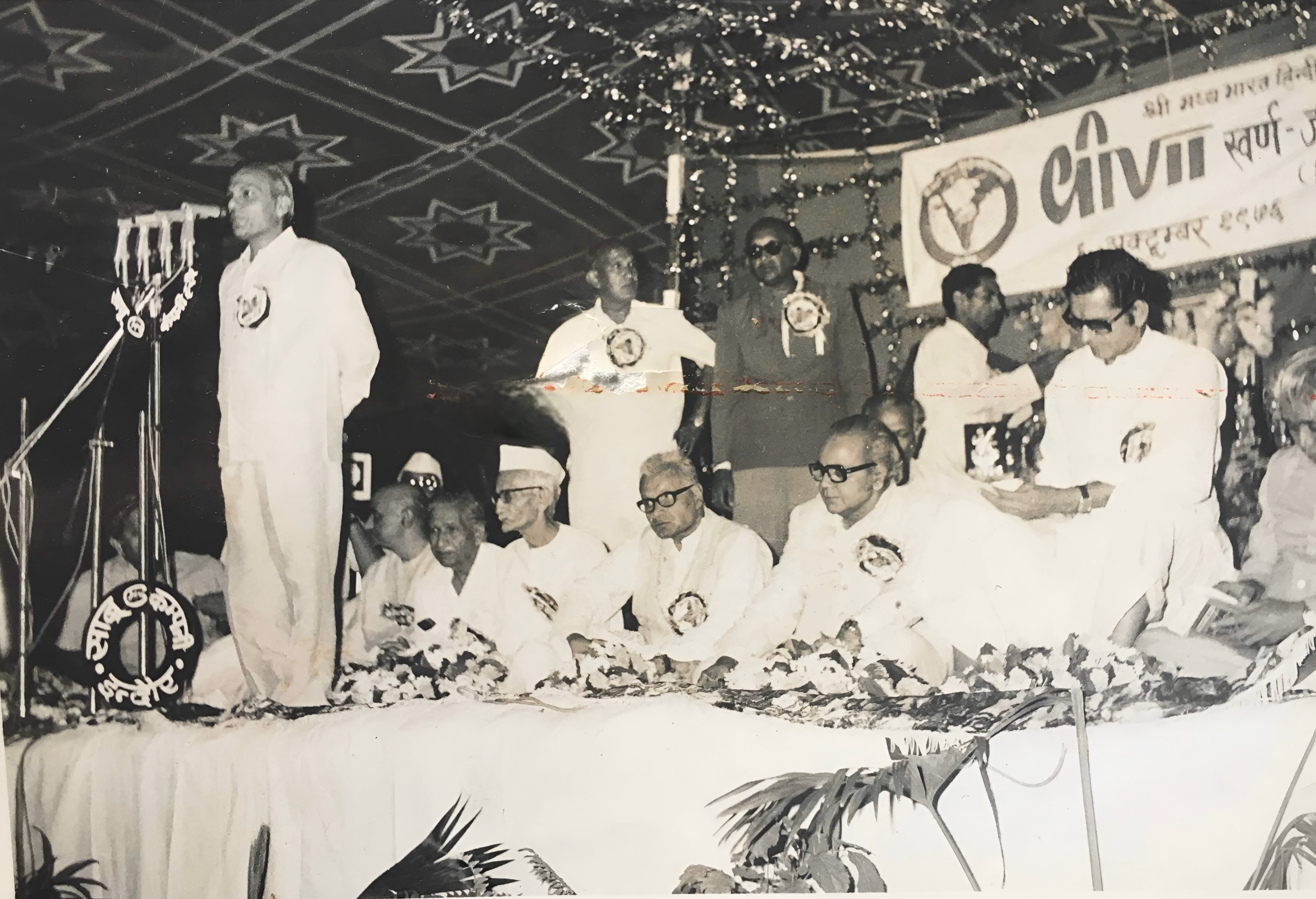
Shyama Charan Shukla, then Chief Minister of Madhya Pradesh, at the 50th anniversary celebrations of Veena Magazine, with Narayan Prasad Shukla

== Legacy ==
India Post issued a postage stamp in 2012 to commemorate him.

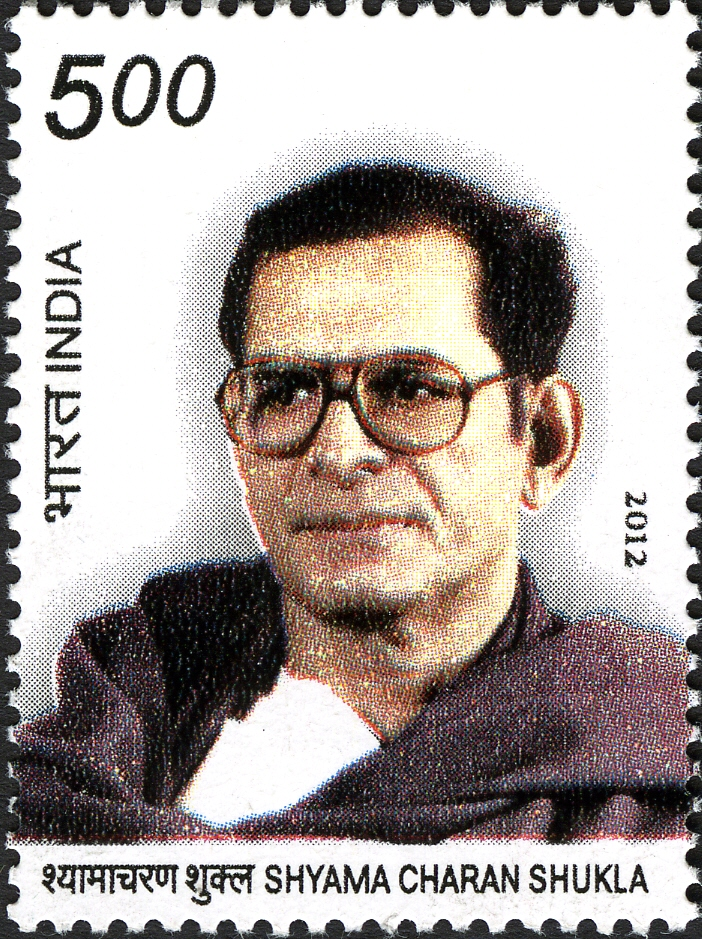
