= Vidya Charan Shukla =

Indian politician

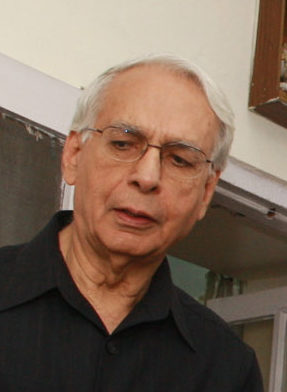
- Shukla in 2011

Minister of Parliamentary Affairs
- In office 18 January 1993 – 17 January 1996
- Prime Minister: Pamulaparthi Venkata Narasimha Rao
- Preceded by: Ghulam Nabi Azad
- Succeeded by: Ghulam Nabi Azad

Minister of External Affairs
- In office 21 November 1990 – 20 February 1991
- Prime Minister: Chandra Shekhar
- Preceded by: Chandra Shekhar (Acting)
- Succeeded by: Chandra Shekhar (Acting)

Member of Parliament, Lok Sabha
- In office 19 June 1991 – 10 May 1996
- Preceded by: Ramesh Bais
- Succeeded by: Ramesh Bais
- Constituency: Raipur
- In office 12 January 1980 – 19 June 1991
- Preceded by: Brij Lal Verma
- Succeeded by: Pawan Diwan
- Constituency: Mahasamund
- In office 25 March 1971 – 24 March 1977
- Preceded by: Lakhan Lal Gupta
- Succeeded by: Purushottam Kaushik
- Constituency: Raipur
- In office 25 March 1967 – 24 March 1971
- Preceded by: Constituency established
- Succeeded by: Krishna Agrawal
- Constituency: Mahasamund
- In office 1957 – 1962
- Preceded by: Constituency established
- Succeeded by: Minimata
- Constituency: Balodabazar

7th President of Indian Olympic Association
- In office 1984–1987
- Preceded by: Bhalindra Singh
- Succeeded by: Sivanthi Adithan

Personal details
- Born: 2 August 1929 Raipur, Central Provinces and Berar, British India (now in Chhattisgarh, India)
- Died: 11 June 2013 (aged 83) Gurgaon, Haryana, India
- Party: Indian National Congress (1957-1987, 1991-2003, 2007-2013); Jan Morcha (1987-1989); Janata Dal (1989-1990); Samajwadi Janata Party (Rashtriya) (1990-1991); Nationalist Congress Party (2003); Bharatiya Janata Party (2003-2004)
- Relations: Shyama Charan Shukla (brother); Amitesh Shukla (nephew)
- Parent: Ravishankar Shukla (father)

Vidya Charan Shukla (2 August 1929 – 11 June 2013) was an Indian politician whose political career spanned six decades. He was predominantly a member of the Indian National Congress, but also had spells in Jan Morcha, Janata Dal, Samajwadi Janata Party (Rashtriya), Nationalist Congress Party and Bharatiya Janata Party. He was known as a close associate of Indira Gandhi.

== Personal life ==
Shukla was born on 2 August 1929 in Raipur. His father Ravishankar Shukla was a lawyer, an Indian National Congress politician from Central Provinces and Berar and the first Chief Minister of Madhya Pradesh. His older brother, Shyama Charan Shukla, was also an INC politician and served as Chief Minister of Madhya Pradesh. He had seven other siblings.

Vidya Charan Shukla graduated from Morris College, Nagpur in 1951. He started Allwyn Cooper Pvt Ltd, which organized big-game safari and photo expeditions of wildlife in the forests of central India.

== Political career ==
In the 1957 general elections, he was elected as a Member of Parliament in the Lok Sabha, on an Indian National Congress ticket from Balodabazar constituency. He became one of the youngest MPs in the 2nd Lok Sabha. Subsequently, he won Lok Sabha elections from Mahasamund in 1962, 1964 (bypoll), 1967, 1980, 1984 and 1989; and from Raipur in 1971 and 1991. He lost from Raipur in 1977 and 1998; and from Mahasamund in 2004. He was elected to Lok Sabha a total of 9 times.

When Indira Gandhi became Prime Minister in 1966, he was included in her Cabinet, serving as Minister of State from 1967 to 1977, including as Minister of State with Independent Charge of Information and Broadcasting. Despite a versatile career, Shukla's role as Information and Broadcasting Minister during the Emergency period had got him some odium as propagandist for Indira Gandhi’s government. His ministry attracted adverse attention for the media censor policy during that period when freedom of speech was under attack. The Justice Shah Commission of Inquiry which went into the Emergency excesses, was stunned when V. C. Shukla owned the entire responsibility for the functioning of his ministry. He had banned Kishore Kumar's songs on All India Radio because Kishore Kumar had refused to sing at an Indira Gandhi rally. He was known for his iron-fist handling of the media during the Emergency. He was also a minister in Rajiv Gandhi lead Congress government, but left and joined the revolt against Rajiv Gandhi in the mid-1980s and was one of the founders of Jan Morcha along with Arun Nehru, V.P. Singh and Arif Mohammad Khan. He later became a minister in the National Front government of 1989-90 under V.P. Singh and switched allegiance to join the subsequent Chandrasekhar government and served as Minister for External Affairs of India during 1990-91 under Prime Minister Chandra Shekhar, during the Lok Sabha as a member of Janata Dal. He again returned to Congress and also served as Cabinet Minister under Prime Minister P.V. Narasimha Rao during 1991-96 as Minister of Parliamentary Affairs and Minister of Irrigation. In 2003 he shifted to Nationalist Congress Party and headed the Chhattisgarh Unit of NCP. However, he changed his political allegiance and joined BJP towards end of 2003, but in 2004 Lok Sabha elections he himself lost on the BJP ticket from Mahasamund against Ajit Jogi of INC. After the defeat he resigned from BJP in 2004. From 2004 he was in a political state of limbo and was trying to return to Congress Party until finally in 2007 when Sonia Gandhi, the Congress leader, approved his return to the Congress party. He was in Congress from 2007 until his death in 2013.

== Death ==
Vidya Charan Shukla was part of Congress Party's Parivartan Yatra in Chhattisgarh, when he was injured in Naxal attack on 25 May 2013. He was later moved to Medanta at Gurgaon, where he succumbed to his injuries on 11 June 2013.

President Pranab Mukherjee in his condolence message said Vidya Charan Shukla was a veteran Parliamentarian, able administrator and an outstanding statesman. Shekhar Dutt, the Chhattisgarh Governor said his death marks the end of an era. Several leaders including then Prime Minister, Manmohan Singh, Sonia Gandhi, Lal Krishna Advani and others, cutting across party lines paid tribute to him and many national leaders were present at his last rites.

The then-newly elected Chhattisgarh government had set up an SIT to probe into the incident which caused his death. He is survived by his wife and three daughters.

== See also ==
- List of assassinated Indian politicians

Political offices
Preceded by Inder Kumar Gujral	Ministry of Information and Broadcasting; 1975–1977	Succeeded by L. K. Advani
Preceded by Inder Kumar Gujral	Minister of External Affairs; 1990–1991	Succeeded by Madhavsinh Solanki
Preceded by Ghulam Nabi Azad	Ministry of Parliamentary Affairs; 1993–1996	Succeeded by Ghulam Nabi Azad
Civic offices
Preceded by Bhalindra Singh	President of Indian Olympic Association; 1984–1987	Succeeded by Sivanthi Adithan
