= Dhamtari Assembly constituency =

Legislative Assembly constituency in Chhattisgarh State, India

Coordinates: 20.71°N 81.55°E

Dhamtari
- Constituency No. 58 for the Chhattisgarh Legislative Assembly

Constituency details
- Country: India
- Region: Central India
- State: Chhattisgarh
- District: Dhamtari
- Lok Sabha constituency: Mahasamund
- Established: 2003
- Total electors: 220,402
- Reservation: None

Member of Legislative Assembly
- 6th Chhattisgarh Legislative Assembly
- Incumbent Onkar Sahu
- Party: Indian National Congress
- Elected year: 2018
- Preceded by: Ranjana Dipendra Sahu

Dhamtari is one of the 90 Legislative Assembly constituencies of Chhattisgarh state in India. It is in Dhamtari district.

== Members of Legislative Assembly ==
Year	Member	Party
Madhya Pradesh Legislative Assembly
1952	Ram Gopal Sharma	Indian National Congress
1957	Jhitkoo	Indian National Congress
1957	Purushottamdas	Indian National Congress
1962	Pandhari Rao	Bharatiya Jana Sangh
1967	B. Bissuji	Indian National Congress
1972	Keshrimal	Indian National Congress
1977	Pandhrirao Khushalrao	Janata Party
1980	Jayaben	Indian National Congress
1985	Jayaben	Indian National Congress
1990	Kriparam Hiralal Sahu	Bharatiya Janata Party
1993	Keshri Mal	Indian National Congress
1998	Harshad Mehta	Indian National Congress
Chhattisgarh Legislative Assembly
2003	Inder Chopra	Bharatiya Janata Party
2008	Gurumukh Singh Hora	Indian National Congress
2013	Gurumukh Singh Hora	Indian National Congress
2018	Ranjana Dipendra Sahu	Bharatiya Janata Party
2023	Onkar Sahu	Indian National Congress

== Election results ==
=== 2023 ===
2023 Chhattisgarh Legislative Assembly election: Dhamtari
Party	Candidate	Votes	%	±%
INC	Onkar Sahu	88,544	48.44	+12.07
BJP	Ranjana Dipendra Sahu	85,938	47.02	+10.38
NOTA	None of the Above	2,695	1.47	+1.15
Majority		2,606	1.42	+1.15
Turnout		182,781	82.93	+0.66
INC gain from BJP		Swing		

=== 2018 ===
Chhattisgarh Legislative Assembly Election, 2018: Dhamtari
Party	Candidate	Votes	%	±%
BJP	Ranjana Dipendra Sahu	63,198	36.64	
INC	Gurumukh Singh Hora	62,734	36.37	
Independent	Anand Pawar	29,163	16.91	
JCC	Digvijay Singh Kiridutt	3,299	1.91	
Independent	Rajeshwari Domain Sahu	2,856	1.66	
Independent	Tirath Raj Futan	2,061	1.19	
AAP	Shatruhan Singh Sahu	1,736	1.01	
Independent	Bhagesh Baid	1,585	0.92	
NOTA	None of the Above	551	0.32	
Majority		464	0.27	
Turnout		172,482	82.27	
BJP gain from INC		Swing		

== See also ==
- List of constituencies of the Chhattisgarh Legislative Assembly
- Dhamtari district
- Dhamtari
