= National Highway 353 (India) =

National highway in India

National Highway 353
- Map of National Highway 353 in red

Route information
- Auxiliary route of NH 53
- Length: 146 km (91 mi)

Major junctions
- North end: Ghorai, Chhattisgarh
- South end: Khariar, Odisha

Location
- Country: India
- States: Chhattisgarh, Odisha
- Primary destinations: Mahasamund, Bagbahara, Nuapada

Highway system
- Roads in India; Expressways; National; State; Asian
← NH 53	→ NH 59

National Highway 353 (NH 353) is highway that connects Ghorai with Khariar. It is a spur road of National Highway 53. NH-753E traverses the states of Chhattisgarh and Odisha in India.

== Route ==
NH53 near Ghorai, Mahasamund, Bagbahara, Nuapada, NH59 near Khariar

== Junctions ==
NH 53 Terminal near Ghorai Mahasamund
NH 59 Terminal near Khariar.

== See also ==
- List of national highways in India
- National Highways Development Project
