= Belsonda =

Coordinates: 21.1430°N 82.0439°E

Belsonda is a suburb of the city of Mahasamund and a railway station in the Mahasamund district of the Indian state of Chhattisgarh.

== Geography ==
Belsonda is situated on National Highway 217 and 4 kilometres (2.5 mi) from National Highway 6.

== Industries ==
Belsonda is one of the industrial areas of Mahasamund along with Birkoni. It lies 5 kilometres (3.1 mi) from the city center. The suburb is home to the Shiwalik Power Plant, the Dainik Bhaskar Power Plant, the Indane Gas Tanker Plant and the Water Filter Plant for Mahasamund.

== Railway ==
Belsonda is served by Belsonda railway station which belongs to the East Coast Railway (Sambalpur railway division), its neighbourhood stations are Mahasamund and Arang. It is also the New Railway Yard of Mahasamund city.

Only passenger trains stop at suburb's railway station. The railway goods shed in Mahasamund is being moved to Belsonda due to traffic problems in the city center.
