= Chaturi Nand =

Indian politician

Member of the Chhattisgarh Legislative Assembly
- Incumbent
- Assumed office 3 December 2023
- Preceded by: Kismat Lal Nand
- Constituency: Saraipali

Personal details
- Born: 12 November 1980 (age 45) Singhanpur, Chhattisgarh, India
- Party: Indian National Congress
- Education: Pandit Ravishankar Shukla University

Chaturi Nand (born 1980) is an Indian politician from Chhattisgarh. She is an MLA from Saraipali Assembly constituency, which is reserved for Scheduled Caste community, in Mahasamund district. She won the 2023 Chhattisgarh Legislative Assembly election, representing the Indian National Congress.

== Early life and education ==
Nand is from Barihapali village, Saraipali post, Mahasamund district, Chhattisgarh. She completed her B.S.C. in 2002, MA. Hindi in 2008 and B.Ed. in 2019 at Pandit Ravishankar Shukla University.

== Career ==
Nand won from Saraipali Assembly constituency representing the Indian National Congress in the 2023 Chhattisgarh Legislative Assembly election. She polled 100,503 votes and defeated his nearest rival, Sarla Kosariya of Bharatiya Janata Party, by a margin of 41,888 votes.
