= Belsonda railway station =

Railway station in Chhattisgarh, India

Belsonda Railway Station

General information
- Location: Belsonda, Mahasamund district, Chhattisgarh; India
- Coordinates: 21.1548°N 82.0354°E
- Elevation: 281 metres (922 ft)
- System: Indian Railways station
- Owner: Indian Railways
- Operator: East Coast Railway
- Platforms: 2
- Tracks: 4

Construction
- Structure type: Standard (on-ground station)
- Parking: No
- Cycle facilities: No

Other information
- Status: Construction – diesel-line doubling
- Station code: BLSN
- Zone(s): East Coast Railway
- Division(s): Solapur

History
- Opened: TBA
Location

Belsonda Railway Station is a small railway station in Mahasamund district, Chhattisgarh. Its code is BLSN. It serves Belsonda city. The station consists of 2 platforms. The platform is not well sheltered. It lacks many facilities including water and sanitation.

== Major trains ==
- Raipur–Titlagarh Passenger
- Junagarh Road–Raipur Passenger
- Visakhapatnam–Durg Passenger
