= Rupkumari Choudhary =

Member of the Lok Sabha

Member of Parliament, Lok Sabha
- Incumbent
- Assumed office 4 June 2024
- Preceded by: Chunni Lal Sahu
- Constituency: Mahasamund

Member of Chhattisgarh Legislative Assembly
- In office 2013–2018
- Preceded by: Devendra Bahadur Singh
- Succeeded by: Devendra Bahadur Singh
- Constituency: Basna

Personal details
- Born: 5 July 1976 (age 50) Dhanapali, Mahasamund district, Chhattisgarh
- Party: Bharatiya Janata Party
- Spouse: Omprakash Choudhary (m. 1993)
- Children: 1 son, 2 daughters
- Parent: Kshemraj Patel (father)
- Occupation: Agriculture

Rupkumari Choudhary (born 5 July 1976) is an Indian politician. She currently serves as Member of Parliament, Lok Sabha from Mahasamund. Previously she had been elected as a member of the Chhattisgarh Legislative Assembly from Basna in 2013.

Lok Sabha
Preceded by Chunni Lal Sahu	Member of Parliament for Mahasamund; 2024 – Present	Incumbent
