= Chandrapur Birra Assembly constituency =

Constituency of the Maharashtra legislative assembly in India

Chandrapur Birra
- Former constituency for the Madhya Pradesh Legislative Assembly

Constituency details
- Country: India
- Region: Central India
- State: Madhya Pradesh
- Established: 1951
- Abolished: 1955
- Total electors: 1,06,330
- Reservation: SC

Chandrapur Birra Assembly constituency was an assembly constituency in the India state of Madhya Pradesh.

== Members of the Legislative Assembly ==
Election	Member	Party
1952	Gajanan	Indian National Congress
1952	Shashibhushan Singh	Independent politician

== Election results ==
=== Assembly Election 1952 ===
1952 Hyderabad State Legislative Assembly election : Chandrapur Birra
Party	Candidate	Votes	%	±%
INC	Gajanan	15,606	23.84%	New
Independent	Shashibhushan Singh	9,963	15.22%	New
Independent	Mulchand	5,564	8.50%	New
Independent	Uderam	4,665	7.13%	New
KMPP	Pitambar Prasad	4,322	6.60%	New
Independent	Raghunandan Prasad	3,693	5.64%	New
RRP	Chamru	3,608	5.51%	New
Independent	Dataram	3,577	5.46%	New
Independent	Krishnachandra	3,492	5.33%	New
Independent	Shyam Kumar	3,331	5.09%	New
Margin of victory		5,643	8.62%	
Turnout		65,471	61.57%	
Total valid votes		65,471		
Registered electors		106,330		
INC win (new seat)				
