= Bagbahara =

- town
- Location in Chhattisgarh, India Bagbahara (India)
- Coordinates: 21.03°N 82.38°E
- Country: India
- State: Chhattisgarh
- District: Mahasamund
- Elevation: 360 m (1,180 ft)

Population (2011)
  - Total: 19,529

Languages
  - Official: Hindi, Chhattisgarhi
- Time zone: UTC+5:30 (IST)
- Vehicle registration: CG

Bagbahara is a town and a Municipality (Nagar Palika Parishad) in Mahasamund district in the state of Chhattisgarh, India. It is situated on National Highway No. 353 and Raipur-Vishakhapattanam Rail Route.

== Geography ==
Bagbahara is located at 21.03°N 82.38°E. It has an average elevation of 360 m (1,180 ft).

== Demographics ==
As of 2001 India census, Bagbahara, located 90 kilometres east of Raipur had a population of 16,746. Males constitute 50% of the population and females 50%. Bagbahara has an average literacy rate of 59%, lower than the national average of 59.5%; with 59% of the males and 41% of females literate. 15% of the population is under 6 years of age.

== Economy ==
Most of the population in the town are involved in farming. There are many rice mills in Bagbahara. In the other side the small & large scale factories are also situated in this town which gives an employment to the poor & unemployed peoples. The Town has a good market as well as all types of shops.

== Transport ==
The town is connected to rest of the country by state highway and rail route. It falls on the Raipur Mahasamund Visakhapatnam route when travelling by train. Bus service is available frequently for Mahasamund. Direct buses for Raipur, Odisha are available for a specific time table.

=== Nearest Airport ===
Raipur Airport is located 70 km (Approximately) towards west direction, via Mahasamund-Raipur-Mana Road Route.

== Culture ==
The town is also famous for the temple at Chandi Dongri. Thousands of devotees from the adjacent area to visit the temple in Navratri.
