= Rajim Assembly constituency =

Legislative Assembly constituency in Chhattisgarh State, India

Coordinates: 20.97°N 81.89°E

Rajim
- Constituency No. 54 for the Chhattisgarh Legislative Assembly

Constituency details
- Country: India
- Region: Central India
- State: Chhattisgarh
- District: Gariaband
- Lok Sabha constituency: Mahasamund
- Established: 1961
- Total electors: 228,453
- Reservation: None

Member of Legislative Assembly
- 6th Chhattisgarh Legislative Assembly
- Incumbent Rohit Sahu
- Party: Bharatiya Janata Party
- Elected year: 2023
- Preceded by: Amitesh Shukla

Rajim is one of the 90 Legislative Assembly constituencies of Chhattisgarh state in India. It is in Gariaband district and is a segment of Mahasamund Lok Sabha constituency.

== Members of the Legislative Assembly ==
Year	Winner	Party
Madhya Pradesh Legislative Assembly
Prior to 1961: Constituency did not exist
1962	Shyama Charan Shukla	Indian National Congress
1967	Shyama Charan Shukla	Indian National Congress
1972	Shyama Charan Shukla	Indian National Congress
1977	Pawan Diwan	Janata Party
1980	Jiwanlal Sahu	Indian National Congress
1985	Punit Ram Sahu	Bharatiya Janata Party
1990	Shyama Charan Shukla	Indian National Congress
1993	Shyama Charan Shukla	Indian National Congress
1998	Shyama Charan Shukla	Indian National Congress
1999^	Amitesh Shyama Charan Shukla	Indian National Congress
Chhattisgarh Legislative Assembly
2003	Chandu Lal Sahu	Bharatiya Janata Party
2008	Amitesh Shyama Charan Shukla	Indian National Congress
2013	Santosh Upadhyay	Bharatiya Janata Party
2018	Amitesh Shyama Charan Shukla	Indian National Congress
2023	Rohit Sahu	Bharatiya Janata Party

^by-election

== Election results ==
=== 2023 ===
2023 Chhattisgarh Legislative Assembly election: Rajim
Party	Candidate	Votes	%	±%
BJP	Rohit Sahu	96,423	50.16	+26.86
INC	Amitesh Shukla	84,512	43.96	−12.46
Independent	Santu Dhruw	3,240	1.69	
NOTA	None of the Above	2,506	1.30	−1.46
Majority		11,911	6.20	−26.92
Turnout		192,226	84.14	+1.32
BJP gain from INC		Swing		

=== 2018 ===
Chhattisgarh Legislative Assembly Election, 2018: Rajim
Party	Candidate	Votes	%	±%
INC	Amitesh Shukla	99,041	56.42	
BJP	Santosh Upadhyay	40,909	23.30	
JCC	Rohit Sahu	23,776	13.54	
NOTA	None of the Above	4,844	2.76	
Majority		58,132	33.12	
Turnout		175,553	82.82	
INC gain from BJP		Swing		

== See also ==
- Rajim
- Gariaband district
- List of constituencies of Chhattisgarh Legislative Assembly
