= Pawan Diwan =

Indian politician

Member of Parliament, Lok Sabha
- In office 1991–1998
- Preceded by: Vidya Charan Shukla
- Succeeded by: Chandra Shekhar Sahu
- Constituency: Mahasamund

Member of Madhya Pradesh Legislative Assembly
- In office 1977 – 1980
- Preceded by: Shyama Charan Shukla
- Succeeded by: Jiwanlal Sahu
- Constituency: Rajim

Personal details
- Born: 1 January 1945 (age 81)
- Party: Indian National Congress

Pawan Diwan is an Indian politician. He was elected to the Lok Sabha as a member of the Indian National Congress.
