= Nemichand =

Indian politician

Nemichand Jain was an Indian politician from the state of the Madhya Pradesh. He represented Mahasamund Vidhan Sabha constituency of undivided Madhya Pradesh Legislative Assembly by winning General election of 1957, mostly known for his industrial reforms in town.
