= Dr. C.V. Raman University =

State private university in Kota, India

Coordinates: 22.2791°N 82.0111°E

- Type: Private
- Established: 2006
- Affiliations: UGC, BCI
- Chancellor: Santosh Choubey
- Vice-Chancellor: Dr. Pradeep Kumar Ghosh
- Location: Kota, Bilaspur, Chhattisgarh, India
- Website: http://cvru.ac.in

Dr. C.V. Raman University is a state private university located in Kota, Chhattisgarh, India. Established on 3 November 2006 by All India Society for Electronics & Computer Technology (AISECT). It is named after C.V. Raman.

== Faculties ==
The university comprises the following faculties:

- Faculty of Engineering and Technology
- Faculty of Computer Science and Information Technology
- Faculty of Humanities
- Faculty of Commerce
- Faculty of Education
- Faculty of Journalism
- Faculty of Law
- Faculty of Management
- Faculty of Science
- Faculty of Open and Distance Learning Education.
