= Balkrishna Ganesh Khaparde =

Leader of Swaraj Party

Balkrishna Ganesh Khaparde (1882–1968) was a leader of the Swaraj Party from Amravati, India. He was a lawyer by profession like his father Ganesh Shrikrishna Khaparde who was a close ally of Bal Gangadhar Tilak.

He belonged to ‘Tilak School of Thought’ and was a prominent leader in Swarajya Party. He was twice elected to the Second and Third Provincial Central Provinces Legislative Council in 1923 and 1927. He was minister of Central Provinces and Berar state.

He used to write under the pen name Baba Bharti in the Marathi Magazine Prasad, published from Pune and wrote the book ‘From Science to Samadhi’.

He was the chief trustee of the Badrinath Temple and as such he had to walk 120 miles from Dehradun to the interior of the Himalayas to open the gates of Badrinath Temple after winter every year. His name is still adorned in the temple.

In 1968, he courted death by Prayopaweshan, meaning to liberate the immortal soul from the mortal body by voluntary fasting unto death.
