= Shivdas Daga =

Indian politician

Member of Parliament, Lok Sabha
- In office 1952–1957
- Constituency: Mahasamund

Member of Central Legislative Assembly

Personal details
- Born: 22 November 1885 Bikaner, Rajasthan, British India
- Died: 10 June 1952 (aged 66) Raipur, Madhya Pradesh, India
- Spouse: Chhotibai Daga
- Parent(s): Bisesar Das (father); Gomati Devi (mother)
- Occupation: Freedom fighter Social reformer Politician

Seth Shivdas Daga (alternative spelling, Sheodas Daga; 1885–1952) was an Indian freedom fighter and politician from Raipur, in present-day Chhattisgarh. He was involved in India's independence movement, including the Non-cooperation movement and Civil disobedience movement, and was imprisoned for his involvement independence activities.

Daga was elected as the member of parliament in the 1952 general election from the Mahasamund Lok Sabha constituency of Chhattisgarh. Before independence, he had served as a Member of Central Legislative Assembly of British India from Raipur. He died on 10 June 1952.

== Early life ==
Shivdas Daga was born 22 November 1885 in Bikaner, Rajasthan, to Bisesar Das and Gomati Devi. He later moved to Arang, near Raipur, where he completed his early education. He became a farmer and businessman in Raipur.

== Freedom movement ==
In 1919, Daga was appointed as an Honorary Magistrate. He became involved in the Indian independence movement following Mahatma Gandhi's arrival in 1920. Daga resigned from his government position to participate in the Non-cooperation movement and was involved in establishing the Rashtriya Vidyalaya in Raipur.

Daga also took part in the Civil Disobedience Movement in 1930, organizing local protests and activities in Raipur. He was imprisoned for his involvement in the movement, from June 1930 to March 1931, and released following the Gandhi–Irwin Pact. He continued his political work in the region, including participating in the 1939 Tripuri Congress session and serving as president of the Raipur Congress Committee for several years. In 1940, Daga was arrested during Satyagraha movement. He was again detained in 1942 during the Quit India Movement after attending the Congress session in Bombay.

== Politics ==
He was elected as a Member of Parliament (Lok Sabha) from the Mahasamund Lok Sabha constituency in the 1952 General election as a candidate of the Indian National Congress, securing 110,886 votes. Daga also served as a Member of the Central Legislative Assembly during British India.

== Philanthropy ==
Shivdas Daga supported various social causes, including contributing to the Harijan Hostel founded by Pandit Sundarlal Sharma. He also donated land and ₹20,000 for the construction of the Congress Bhavan in Raipur. To promote education for girls, Daga established a school in Arang, named after his wife, Chhotibai Daga.
