= Rohit Sahu =

Indian politician (born 1978)

Rohit Sahu (born 9 June 1978) is an Indian politician from Chhattisgarh. He is an MLA from Rajim Assembly constituency in Gariaband District. He won the 2023 Chhattisgarh Legislative Assembly election, representing the Bharatiya Janata Party.

== Early life and education ==
Sahu is from Rajim, Gariaband District, Chhattisgarh. He is the son of Vishnu Sahu. He completed his Class 12 through Chhattisgarh State Open School, Raipur in 2015. Later, he discontinued his studies.

== Career ==
Sahu won from Rajim Assembly constituency representing the Bharatiya Janata Party in the 2023 Chhattisgarh Legislative Assembly election. He polled 96,423 votes and defeated his nearest rival, Amitesh Shukla of the Indian National Congress, by a margin of 11,911 votes.
