= Narayan Bhaskar Khare =

Indian politician

Dr. Narayan Bhaskar Khare (19 March 1884, in Panvel – 1970, in Nagpur) was an Indian politician. He was chief minister of Central Province (present day Madhya Pradesh) in the 1930s as a Congress politician. Later he left Congress and joined Hindu Maha Sabha.

== Early life and education ==
Narayan Bhaskar Khare's father was a lawyer with an unsteady income. He stayed with his uncle and was educated at Maratha High School, Bombay and the Government College, Jabalpur. He later joined Medical College Lahore where he took his degree in medicine in 1907 securing first rank and winning the Dr. Rahimkhan Gold Medal and another medal for surgery. In 1913, he became the first M. D. of the Punjab University.

== Political career ==
Khare was member of Indian National Congress from 1916 to 1938. He was the president of the Central Provinces Provincial Congress Committee, Harijan Sewak Sangh, Nagpur and a member of the All India Congress Committee for several years. He was also the founder and editor of a Marathi paper Tarun Bharat which was used to carry on the Congress propaganda in 1926.

Khare was elected as a member of the Second Legislative Council of the Central Provinces from 1923 to 1926 and again to the Third Legislative Council from 1927 to 1930. Khare resigned from the Legislative Council in pursuance of the mandate by the Lahore Congress and was imprisoned for participating in Civil Disobedience Movement. From 1935 to 1937 he was a member of the Legislative Assembly where he initiated the Arya Marriage Validation Bill which was later put on the Statute Book.

After the enactment of the Government of India Act 1935, elections were held to the British Indian provinces in 1937 when Khare was elected as a member to the newly formed Central Provinces and Berar legislative assembly where he served till 1943. He became the first Premier of the province and served from 14 July 1937 to 29 July 1938.

During the Quit India Movement in 1942, mobs in Ashti and Chimur killed some policemen. Thirty people were tried and sentenced to hang. Khare formed the Capital Punishment Relief Society to help the prisoners of Ashti and Chimur.

Khare was a member of the Viceroy's Executive Council from 7 May 1943 to 3 July 1946 where he was in charge of the Commonwealth Relations Department. He was responsible for placing on the Statute book the Indian Reciprocity Act Amendment Bill and enforcing it against South African Europeans for getting acquitted all the highly placed Indians in Malaya, like Dr. Goho, who were charged with high treason and collaboration with the Japanese, for securing rights of citizenship for Indians domiciled in America, for withdrawing the High Commissioner of India from South Africa, for applying economic sanctions against South Africa and for lodging complaint against South Africa in the United Nations.

Khare later became the Prime Minister of then Alwar State from 19 April 1947 to 7 February 1948. He was elected as a member of the Constituent Assembly of India in July 1947.

== Premier of Central Provinces and Berar ==
Khare was appointed as the Premier or Chief Minister of the first elected government of the Central Provinces and Berar in August 1937. His sacking of Ravi Shankar Shukla, Dwarika Prasad Mishra and D S Mehta led to disciplinary action against him by the Congress President Subhas Chandra Bose. He resigned at the request of the Indian National Congress leadership in July 1938 and was ousted from party. He wrote a pamphlet accusing Mahatma Gandhi and Sardar Patel for his ouster from party titled "To my Countrymen: My Defence".

After the assassination of Mahatma Gandhi, Khare was put under house arrest in Delhi on suspicion of being a part of the conspiracy with Nathuram Godse and Narayan Apte. He was immediately sacked from his Constituent Assembly seat in February 1948 and as Prime minister of Alwar state. The government tried to implicate him in mass killings and communal violence but had to release him in absence of hard evidence. Khare rejoiced, as mentioned in his book: "As a result, today there is not a single Muslim in the whole of the Alwar State… In this way, the Meo problem in the State which was troubling the State for several centuries has been solved at least for the time being." He later he joined Hindu Mahasabha on 15 August 1949 and was its president from 1949 to 1951 and the vice-president of the All India Hindu Mahasabha in 1954.

In 1950, he was externed from Punjab and ordered by the Central Provinces Government to live in Nagpur. This order was cancelled and Khare unsuccessfully challenged the externment order of Punjab Government in Supreme Court. Supreme Court bench by a majority of 3–2 allowed the order and its constitutionality.

Khare became a Member of the Lok Sabha from Gwalior, Madhya Bharat in 1952 and served till 1955. He was a member of the Maharaja Bagh Club and Indian Gymkhana Club, Nagpur.

His biography in Marathi was published in two volumes in 1943 and 1950. He wrote books such as "My Defence" and "Some speeches and statements of Dr. Khare". In 1959, he wrote his autobiography "My Political Memoirs or Autobiography" in which he claimed that he prevented Alwar from joining Pakistan. He later settled in Nagpur and died in 1970.
