= Amitesh Shukla =

Indian politician

Amitesh Shyama Charan Shukla MLA

Minister of Rural Development
- In office 2000–2003
- Chief Minister: Ajit Jogi
- Preceded by: Office established
- Succeeded by: Ajay Chandrakar

Member of Chhattisgarh Legislative Assembly
- In office 11 December 2018 – 3 December 2023
- Preceded by: Santosh Upadhyay
- Succeeded by: Rohit Sahu
- Constituency: Rajim
- In office 2008–2013
- Preceded by: Chandu Lal Sahu
- Succeeded by: Santosh Upadhyay
- Constituency: Rajim
- In office 2000–2003
- Preceded by: Constituency established
- Succeeded by: Chandu Lal Sahu
- Constituency: Rajim

Member of Madhya Pradesh Legislative Assembly
- In office 1999–2000
- Preceded by: Shyama Charan Shukla
- Succeeded by: Constituency disestablished
- Constituency: Rajim

Personal details
- Born: Amitesh Shyama Charan Shukla; 12 October 1957 (age 68) Gariaband, Madhya Pradesh, India (now in Chhattisgarh, India)
- Party: Indian National Congress (since 1999)
- Relations: Ravishankar Shukla (grandfather); Vidya Charan Shukla (uncle)
- Parent: Shyama Charan Shukla (father)
- Education: B.Com, Durga University; LLB, Sophiya College
- Occupation: Politician
- Profession: Agriculture, Business & Social Worker

Amitesh Shyama Charan Shukla (born 12 October 1957) is an Indian National Congress politician from Chhattisgarh, India. He served as Minister of Rural Development in the Government of Chhattisgarh in 2000–2003.

He is the incumbent member of the Chhattisgarh Legislative Assembly from Rajim, having been elected in 2018. He was also the most senior leader who did not get any Ministry. He was previously elected to the same seat in 1999 (bypoll) and 2008.

== Personal life ==
Amitesh Shukla was born on 12 October 1957 in Gariaband. His father Shyama Charan Shukla was an Indian National Congress politician and thrice served as Chief Minister of Madhya Pradesh.

His grandfather Ravishankar Shukla was a lawyer, an INC politician from Central Provinces and Berar and the first Chief Minister of Madhya Pradesh. His uncle Vidya Charan Shukla, was also an INC politician, a union minister, and a nine-time Member of Parliament in the Lok Sabha.
