= Saraipali Assembly constituency =

Legislative Assembly constituency in Chhattisgarh State, India

Coordinates: 21.32°N 83.02°E

Saraipali
- Constituency No. 39 for the Chhattisgarh Legislative Assembly

Constituency details
- Country: India
- Region: Central India
- State: Chhattisgarh
- District: Mahasamund
- Lok Sabha constituency: Mahasamund
- Established: 2003
- Total electors: 205,107
- Reservation: SC

Member of Legislative Assembly
- 6th Chhattisgarh Legislative Assembly
- Incumbent Chaturi Nand
- Party: Indian National Congress
- Elected year: 2023

Saraipali is one of the 90 Legislative Assembly constituencies of Chhattisgarh state in India.

It is part of Mahasamund district and is reserved for candidates belonging to the Scheduled Castes.

== Members of the Legislative Assembly ==
Election	Name	Party
Madhya Pradesh Legislative Assembly
1952	Ravishankar Shukla	Indian National Congress
1957	Jaideo Gadadhar	Indian National Congress
1962	Rajmahendra Bahadur Singh	Independent politician
1967	J. Satpathi	Indian National Congress
1972	V. B. Singh	Indian National Congress
1977	Mohanlal Ramprasad	Indian National Congress
1980	Mohanlal Ramprasad	Indian National Congress
1985	Pukhraj Singh	Independent politician
1990	Narasingh Pradhan	Bharatiya Janata Party
1993	Mohanlal Choudhary	Indian National Congress
1998	Devendra Bahadur Singh	Indian National Congress
Chhattisgarh Legislative Assembly
2003	Trilochan Patel	Bharatiya Janata Party
2008	Haridas Bharadwaj	Indian National Congress
2013	Ramlal Chouhan	Bharatiya Janata Party
2018	Kismat Lal Nand	Indian National Congress
2023	Chaturi Nand	Indian National Congress

== Election results ==
=== 2023 ===
2023 Chhattisgarh Legislative Assembly election: Saraipali
Party	Candidate	Votes	%	±%
INC	Chaturi Nand	100,503	59.57	−3.77
BJP	Sarla Kosaria	58,615	34.74	+4.42
JCC	Kismat Lal Nand	2,747	1.63	
BSP	Jay Narayan Kishor	1,694	1.00	−0.17
NOTA	None of the Above	1,559	0.92	−1.15
Majority		41,888	24.83	−8.19
Turnout		168,706	82.25	−0.79
INC hold		Swing		

=== 2018 ===
Chhattisgarh Legislative Assembly Election, 2018: Saraipali
Party	Candidate	Votes	%	±%
INC	Kismat Lal Nand	100,302	63.34	
BJP	Shyam Tandi	48,014	30.32	
BSP	Chhabilal Ratre	1,849	1.17	
NOTA	None of the Above	3,270	2.07	
Majority		52,288	33.02	
Turnout		158,348	83.04	
INC gain from BJP		Swing		

== See also ==
- List of constituencies of the Chhattisgarh Legislative Assembly
- Mahasamund district
