= Sampat Agrawal =

Indian politician

Member of the Chhattisgarh Legislative Assembly
- Incumbent
- Assumed office 3 December 2023
- Constituency: Basna Assembly constituency

Personal details
- Party: Bharatiya Janata Party
- Spouse: Saroj Agrawal
- Parent: Jagdish Chandra Agrawal (father)
- Education: MATS University, Postgraduate in Hindi (2018)
- Occupation: Politician; Businessman

Sampat Agrawal (born 1961) is an Indian politician from Chhattisgarh. He is a first time MLA from Basna Assembly constituency in Mahasamund district. He won the 2023 Chhattisgarh Legislative Assembly election, representing the Bharatiya Janata Party.

== Early life and education ==
Agrawal is from Basna, Mahasamund district, Chhattisgarh. He is the son of Jagdish Chandra Agarwal. He completed his post graduation in Hindi at MATS University, Chhattisgarh in 2018. He is a businessman and a director of Neelanchal Engineering Ventures Private Limited.

== Career ==
Agrawal won from Basna Assembly constituency representing the Bharatiya Janata Party in the 2023 Chhattisgarh Legislative Assembly election. He polled 108,871 votes and defeated his nearest rival, Devender Bahadur Singh of the Indian National Congress, by a margin of 36,793 votes.
