= Onkar Sahu =

Indian politician (born 1982)

Member of Chhattisgarh Legislative Assembly
- Incumbent
- Assumed office 2023
- Preceded by: Ranjana Dipendra Sahu
- Constituency: Dhamtari

Personal details
- Party: Indian National Congress
- Profession: Politician

Onkar Sahu (born 1982) is an Indian politician from Chhattisgarh who is an MLA from Dhamtari Assembly constituency in Dhamtari District. He won the 2023 Chhattisgarh Legislative Assembly election, representing the Indian National Congress.

== Early life and education ==
Sahu is from Dhamtari, Chhattisgarh. He is the son of Mannulal Sahu. He passed Class 12 in 2000 at Higher Secondary School, V. K. Dhamtari. He runs photography business and his wife is into cloth business.

== Career ==
Sahu won from Dhamtari Assembly constituency representing the Indian National Congress in the 2023 Chhattisgarh Legislative Assembly election. He polled 88,544 votes and defeated his nearest rival, Rajana Dipendra Sahu of the Bharatiya Janata Party, by a margin of 2,606 votes.
