= Khallari Assembly constituency =

Legislative Assembly constituency in Chhattisgarh State, India

Coordinates: 21.1°N 82.29°E

Khallari
- Constituency No. 41 for the Chhattisgarh Legislative Assembly

Constituency details
- Country: India
- Region: Central India
- State: Chhattisgarh
- District: Mahasamund
- Lok Sabha constituency: Mahasamund
- Established: 2003
- Total electors: 217,389
- Reservation: None

Member of Legislative Assembly
- 6th Chhattisgarh Legislative Assembly
- Incumbent Dwarikadhish Yadav
- Party: Indian National Congress
- Elected year: 2023

Khallari is one of the 90 Legislative Assembly constituencies of Chhattisgarh state in India.

It is part of Mahasamund district.

== Members of the Legislative Assembly ==
Election	Name	Party
Madhya Pradesh Legislative Assembly
Prior to 1976: Constituency did not exist
1977	Ramesh	Janata Party
1980	Laxminarayan Induria	Indian National Congress
1985	Laxminarayan Induria	Indian National Congress
1990	Ramesh	Janata Dal
1993	Bhekhram Sahu	Indian National Congress
1998	Ramesh	Bharatiya Janata Party
Chhattisgarh Legislative Assembly
2003	Preetam Singh Diwan	Bharatiya Janata Party
2008	Paresh Bagbahra	Indian National Congress
2013	Chunni Lal Sahu	Bharatiya Janata Party
2018	Dwarikadhish Yadav	Indian National Congress
2023	Dwarikadhish Yadav	Indian National Congress

== Election results ==
=== 2023 ===
2023 Chhattisgarh Legislative Assembly election: Khallari
Party	Candidate	Votes	%	±%
INC	Dwarikadhish Yadav	104,052	57.86	−0.11
BJP	Alka Chandrakar	66,933	37.22	+13.62
Independent	Santosh Darachand Banjare	2,187	1.22	
NOTA	None of the Above	2,095	1.16	+0.86
Majority		37,119	20.64	−13.73
Turnout		179,833	82.72	−0.52
INC hold		Swing		

=== 2018 ===
Chhattisgarh Legislative Assembly Election, 2018: Khallari
Party	Candidate	Votes	%	±%
INC	Dwarikadhish Yadav	96,108	57.97	
BJP	Monika Dilip Sahu	39,130	23.60	
JCC	Paresh Baghabara	12,649	7.63	
Independent	Bheklal Sahu	5,228	3.15	
NCP	Basanta Thakur	2,972	1.79	
NOTA	None of the Above	499	0.30	
Majority		56,978	34.37	
Turnout		165,799	83.24	
INC gain from BJP		Swing		

== See also ==
- List of constituencies of the Chhattisgarh Legislative Assembly
- Mahasamund district
