= Ravishankar Shukla =

1st Chief Minister of Madhya Pradesh

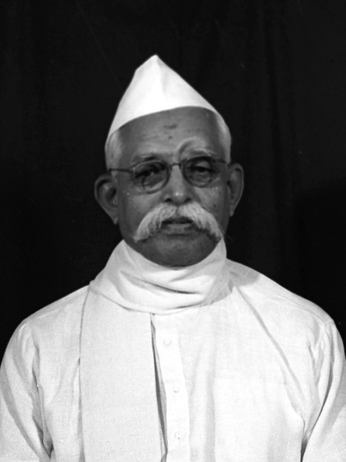

1st Chief Minister of Madhya Pradesh
- In office 26 January 1950 – 31 December 1956
- Preceded by: Office Established
- Succeeded by: Bhagwantrao Mandloi
- Constituency: Saraipali

Member of Constituent Assembly of India
- In office 9 December 1946 – 25 January 1950
- Constituency: Central Provinces and Berar

Personal details
- Born: 2 August 1877 Saugor, Central Provinces, British India (present-day Madhya Pradesh, India)
- Died: 31 December 1956 (aged 79) New Delhi, India
- Party: Indian National Congress
- Spouse: Shrimati Bhawani Devi Shukla
- Children: 6, including Shyama and Vidya
- Relatives: Amitesh Shukla (grandson)
- Occupation: Indian independence activist; Politician

Ravishankar Shukla (2 August 1877 — 31 December 1956) was a leader of the Indian National Congress, Indian independence movement activist, the Premier of the Central Provinces and Berar from 27 April 1946 to 25 January 1950, first Chief Minister of the reorganised Madhya Pradesh state from 1 November 1956 until his death on 31 December 1956, He was elected from Saraipali in Madhya Pradesh (now in Chhattisgarh). He also served as Member of Constituent Assembly of India from Central Provinces and Berar.

== Early life ==
Born in a wealthy Kanyakubja Brahmin family, his father and grandfather were rich and scholarly. His ancestors belonged to district Unnao from Uttar Pradesh. His father, Pandit Jagganath Shukla, came of a family which had resisted British rulers for three generations and his mother, Tulsi Devi, was industrious and a capable manager. Young Ravishankar's earliest years were passed in a scholarly atmosphere heavily charged with Indian classics, Shri Ramcharit Manas and Gita. He was admitted to Sunderlal Guru's Pathshala in Saugor. It was one of the six Pathshalas established by the British in Central Provinces.

Ravishankar continued his schooling at Rajnandgaon and subsequently at Raipur High School. He then shifted to Jubbulpore and joined Robertson College (whose premises then were what is today the Model High School in front of the High Court of Jabalpur) and completed the Intermediate in 1895 aged 18 years. The same year he shifted to Nagpur and joined Hislop College for the graduation course.

== Early life and career (1897–1908) ==
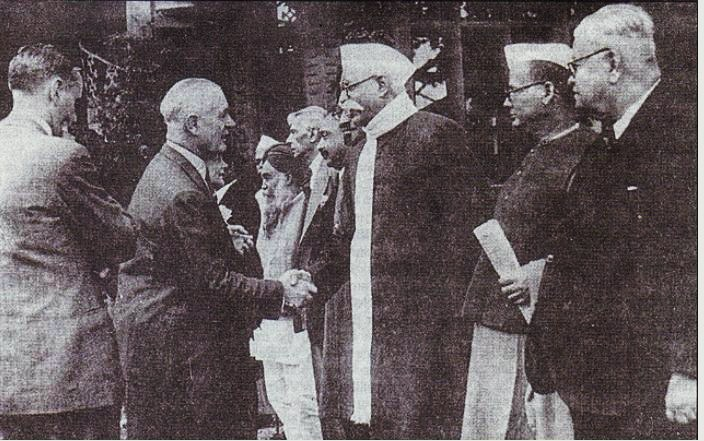
Viceroy Wavell meets Ravishankar Shukla at Simla Conference

When the 13th Congress session took place in 1897 in the nearby town of Amravati, one of his professors, Bhagirath Prasad, decided to attend it and took along with him his student Ravishankar Shukla. This was the first contact between Pt. Shukla and the Congress. Pandit Shukla graduated in 1899, aged 22 years.

Ravishankar married Bhawani Devi, then sixteen years of age, in June 1902. Six months after their marriage, the plague epidemic spread through the town of Jubbulpore. It was here that Bhawani Devi fell victim of the dreaded plague.

In 1904, he took along with him the Maharaja of Bastar to Congress session at Bombay, where he saw barrister Mahatma Gandhi for the first time, who had just arrived from South Africa.

In 1906 and the beginning of 1907, during his last days in Khairagarh, Pt. Shukla privately appeared for Law exams conducted by Calcutta University at Allahabad. After passing the exams, he came back to Rajnandgaon to start legal practice. Within a few years of starting his legal practice, Shukla was a great success as a pleader in the courts of Raipur.

== Struggle for Indian independence (1909–1935) ==
- In 1910, Shukla attended Congress session at Benaras as delegate. Here he met Mahamana Pandit Madan Mohan Malaviya and from then onward theirs would be a lifelong association. At the same time, the Kanyakubja Mahasabha session also took place in Benares. Pt. Shukla participated in this session as well. On his return from Benaras after the Congress he established the state Kanyakubja Sabha whose first session was held in Nagpur in March 1912. In subsequent years he organised Mahasabhas (public meetings) at Raipur and Jabalpur. By the year 1917 Pt. Shukla was acknowledged as the leader of his community throughout the Hindi region of Central Provinces and Berar and United Provinces.
- Pt. Shukla had a strong conviction of the importance of the role of Hindi as a national language, for the pride of the country and the natural convenience it could bring to a child entering school vis-a-vis English as a medium of teaching. He always took the lead and constantly pursued the cause of Hindi as the national language. In 1916, the seventh session of Antar-Bhartiya Sammelan of Hindi at Jubbulpore was held, in which Pt. Shukla participated. After its success, he launched Central Provinces and Berar Hindi Sahitya Sammelan and held its first session at Raipur in 1918. In the fifth session of the Sahitya Sammelan, held at Nagpur in March 1922, he for the first time proposed to incorporate Hindi instead of English as Rashtriya Bhasha (National language).
- A British Minister, Sir Montagu was sent to India in 1917 to assess the situation of unrest arising in India after the First World War. To express the public opinion before the British government, meetings were held all over the country. One such meeting, held in Raipur on 26 August 1917, was addressed by Pt. Shukla: there he called upon his countrymen to make sacrifices and to fight for our rights, otherwise he said we will always remain a colony of the British.

== Political apprenticeship ==
- A special session of Congress was called at Calcutta in September 1920 under the presidency of Lala Lajpat Rai to assess the political situation in the country. Pt. Shukla went to Calcutta to attend the session and there he invited the Congress to hold its next session at Central Provinces and Berar.
- When the British enacted the Rowlatt Act, it was a challenge to the Indian freedom movement. It was from this point that Mahatma Gandhi started his civil disobedience movement with truth and non-violence as principles. The Non-cooperation movement, as it would be known, created the atmosphere of a great revolution in the country. Pt. Shukla did not abandon his legal practice but would now devote most of his time and resources on the national movement. He gave up all his stylish clothes made using English yarn and got them all consigned to the fire, symbolic of emergence into a new era, and instead now the Shukla household would have only Khadi hand-woven, using cotton. In the year 1921 Pt. Shukla became a member of the All India Congress Committee.
- Nagpur University was created in 1923. Before this all the colleges of the state were affiliated to Allahabad and Calcutta Universities. Sir Bipin Krishna Bose, the vice-chancellor of the University, appointed Pandit Shukla as the member of the executive committee of the University.

== Raipur District Council and civil disobedience ==
Pandit Shukla had become a member of the Raipur District Council in 1921. He believed that through these local bodies the freedom struggle could best be fought. Alongside this he wanted to propagate education and an awakening for freedom among the masses. In 1922, the State Government handed over the management of schools to the District Council. Pandit Shukla established contacts with the teachers of these schools and to induce nationalism in them he organised teachers' conferences. There were 310 schools under the district council, and 900 teachers in these schools. Every year about 30,000 students were studying in these schools. These conventions of teachers worked to improve teaching methods, health, cleanliness, and patriotism. Pandit Shukla remained the president of Raipur District Council from 1927 to 1937.

In a meeting of State Congress Committee held at Raipur, Pandit Dwarika Prasad Mishra suggested to name Hindi speaking part of the Central Provinces and Berar as Mahakoshal. In the beginning of 1930 Pandit Shukla & Pt. D. P. Mishra along with Chief of Mahakoshal Congress Committee Seth Govind Das toured the entire Central Provinces to propagate the importance of Satyagrah movement. Pandit Shukla developed a force of young men to extensively propagate the ideals of the satyagraha.

Pandit Shukla was arrested for his participation in Civil Disobedience Movement. Initially, he was kept in Jubbulpore Jail but was soon shifted to Seoni Jail.

In the beginning of 1931, Gandhi-Irwin pact took place. Accordingly, all political prisoners who were imprisoned during Civil Disobedience Movement were released from the jails. On 13 March, Pandit Shukla along with other political prisoners of the State was released from the jail.

While imprisoned Pandit Shukla was again elected president of Raipur District Council on 24 October 1930. Angered on this the State Government on 19 October 1930 by an extraordinary gazette took over the Raipur District Council for three years. The Government stopped all the patriotic programmes run by the District Council under Pandit Shukla. On 8 March 1934 the Council's work was again handed over to Pandit Shukla. He got all the programmes of the Council restarted which were closed by the Government.

To infuse national awakening in the State Pandit Shukla started a Weekly Hindi Magazine Mahakoshal from Nagpur in 1935. Next year this was shifted to Raipur from where it is now published as a prominent Daily.

The British authorities had formed the Central Provinces in 1861 by uniting the former State of Nagpur with the Territory of Saugor-Nerbudda. In doing so, they brought together the Marathi speaking people of the former and the Hindi speaking people of the latter. The two linguistic regions, which comprised the province, had distinctive societies and developed, in course of time, differing economies.

In 1919, Marathi Congressman dominated provincial politics from the capital city of Nagpur. But subsequently they started dividing. The non-Brahmins and Harijans formed parties in opposition to the Congress, and the Congress itself got divided into rival groups of Congressman and the supporters of Tilak. The Marathi Brahmin community which led the Marathi Congress since 1900, regarded Lokmanya Tilak as their political guru and, for reasons of ideology, as from their unwillingness to surrender political power, they resented Gandhiji's attempt to interfere in the politics of their region.

== Provincial elections and aftermath ==
- In 1934, the Congress members agreed to enter the elections for Central Legislative Assembly. In the elections Congress emerged as the largest single political party. Congress had won all over Mahakoshal, Nagpur and Vidarbha. Soon in 1936, the elections for Provincial assemblies also took place. Like other six states, Central Provinces & Berar won with overwhelming and decisive victory for the Congress.
- In the meeting of the Congress Party held on 14 July 1937, Pandit Shukla proposed the name of Dr. Narayan Bhaskar Khare to be the leader of the party in the Legislative Council, which was accepted. Pandit Shukla, Pt. Dwarika Prasad Mishra, Sh. Ram Rao Deshmukh, Sh. Purushottam Balwant Gole, Sh. Durga Shankar Mehta, Barrister Mohd. Yusuf Sharif were members of the Cabinet.
- Pt. Shukla, on taking charge of the Education Ministry, proposed a new programme to bring in basic changes in the method of education. He believed that during the 150 years of the British rule, the Government had deliberately adopted such methods as to get very few educated. He believed that such an education system which was not imparting self-reliance, building moral character and professionalism was of no use and has to be effectively changed. With the view that for prosperity of democracy, education of masses with emphasis on self-reliance has to be done, he introduced 'Vidya-Mandir' education programme. Mahatma Gandhi found that his own principles of basic education are embedded in 'Vidya-Mandir' education plan.
- Pt. Shukla appointed a committee under the presidency of Sh. Zakir Hussain of Jamia Milia to prepare the curriculum for Vidya-Mandir scheme. Spinning, Weaving, Agriculture, Social Studies, General Science, Mathematics, Geography, mother-tongue, Music and Drawing were introduced for primary education. Mahatma Gandhi gave his blessings for success of the programme.
- The Cabinet of Dr. Khare lacked unity from the beginning. Dr. Khare was invariably surrounded by outsiders rather than his own cabinet colleagues. The internal bickering within the cabinet rose so high that the Central Parliamentary Board had to intervene. On 24 May 1938, the Congress members of the State Legislative Assembly were invited at Pachmarhi. The chief of the Congress Parliamentary Board, Sardar Patel, Maulana Azad and Jamnalal Bajaj had come to Pachmarhi to find a solution of this problem. The members of the High Command, after hearing both the factions, got them to agree on a compromise formula, but Dr. Khare despite the advice of Babu Rajendra Prasad insisted on resignation of three ministers from Mahakoshal.
- Shukla, Mishra and Mehta refused to submit their resignations without such instructions from Congress High Command. On 20 July 1938, Dr. Khare asked the British Governor of the State to dismiss these three ministers or else, he said to the Governor, "I am submitting my resignation". The British governor had no hesitation in dismissing the three ministers.
- This act of Dr. Khare was not taken kindly by the High Command and after taking disciplinary action on him, he was asked to resign. To review the situation a meeting of Congress High Command was held in Wardha on 21 to 23 July under the Presidency of Subhas Chandra Bose. Maulana Azad, Sardar Patel and Babu Rajendra Prasad all were of the view that Dr. Khare should resign for the wrong he had done.
- The Congress Legislative Assembly Members met at Wardha on 26 July under the Congress President Subhas Chandra Bose and elected Pandit Ravi Shankar Shukla as their leader.
- Being elected leader of the Congress Party in the Legislative Assembly, Shukla was invited by the Governor to form his Government. Pt. Dwarika Prasad Mishra, Pt. Durga Shankar Mehta, Sambhaji Rao Gokhle, Chhagan Lal Bharuka were members of his Cabinet. From August 1938 to November 1939 this Cabinet remained in office.
- So far there was no popular Congress minded English daily news paper published in the Central Provinces and Berar. With this in view Pandit Shukla formed a Limited Company and started "Nagpur Times" to propagate Congress views of national importance. This paper had to later face censorship of the colonial government in subsequent years of the movement. The paper was severely penalised several times and had to face difficult financial situation, but undoubtedly it maintained its propagation of national policy of Congress.
- On 1 September 1939, Germany declared war on Poland. Within two days this war took shape of World War II. Without taking the opinion of the Legislative Assemblies of the States, the then British Viceroy enjoined India in the war. Congress opposed this and like other Congress ruled states the Cabinet in Central Provinces & Berar submitted its resignation in November 1939 and reverted to the task of opposing the war.

== Personal life ==
He died on 31 December 1956, at the age of 79 at New Delhi and was survived by his wife, six sons (Pt. Ambika Charan Shukla, Pt. Bhagwati Charan Shukla, Pt. Ishwari Charan Shukla, Pt. Girija Charan Shukla, Pt. Shyama Charan Shukla and Pt. Vidya Charan Shukla) and three daughters. Pandit Shukla dominated the Indian political scene, not only before the ten years of his premier and chief ministership, but for decades after his death.

== See also ==
- Shyama Charan Shukla elder son and former Chief Minister of Madhya Pradesh
- Vidya Charan Shukla his son and prominent Indian politician.
- Kranti Trivedi his youngest daughter and a prominent Hindi writer
- Prajapati Trivedi his grandson and son of Kranti Trivedi
