= Kota, Chhattisgarh =

Kota
- city
- Location in Chhattisgarh, India Kota (India)
- Coordinates: 22.3°N 82.03°E
- Country: India
- State: Chhattisgarh
- District: Bilaspur
- Elevation: 330 m (1,080 ft)

Population (2011)
  - Total: 18,405

Languages
  - Official: Hindi, Chhattisgarhi
- Time zone: UTC+5:30 (IST)
- Vehicle registration: CG 10

Kota is a town and a nagar panchayat in Bilaspur district in the Indian state of Chhattisgarh.

== Geography ==
Kota is located at 22.3°N 82.03°E. It has an average elevation of 330 metres (1082 feet).

== Demographics ==
As of the 2001 India census, Kota had a population of 15,020. Males constituted 51% of the population and females 49%. Kota had an average literacy rate of 66%: male literacy was 76% and female literacy was 55%. 16% of the local population was under 6 years of age.
