= Chandu Lal Sahu =

Indian politician (born 1959)

Member of Parliament, Lok Sabha
- In office 2009 – 2019
- Preceded by: Ajit Jogi
- Succeeded by: Chunni Lal Sahu
- Constituency: Mahasamund

Member of Chhattisgarh Legislative Assembly
- In office 2003 – 2008
- Preceded by: Amitesh Shukla
- Succeeded by: Amitesh Shukla
- Constituency: Rajim

Personal details
- Born: 1 June 1959 (age 67) Teka, Raipur, Chhattisgarh
- Party: Bharatiya Janata Party
- Spouse: Smt. Shanta Devi Sahu
- Children: 3
- Occupation: Farmer, Advocate
- As of 12 December, 2016

Chandu Lal Sahu (born 1 June 1959) is an Indian politician. He was elected to the Lok Sabha from Mahasamund as a Bharatiya Janata Party candidate in 2009 and 2014. Previously, he had been elected as a member of the Chhattisgarh Legislative Assembly from Rajim in 2003.
