= 1952 Madhya Pradesh Legislative Assembly election =

Indian state election

- 26 March 1952

All 232 seats in the Madhya Pradesh Legislative Assembly 117 seats needed for a majority
- Registered: 15,513,592
- Turnout: 45.11%
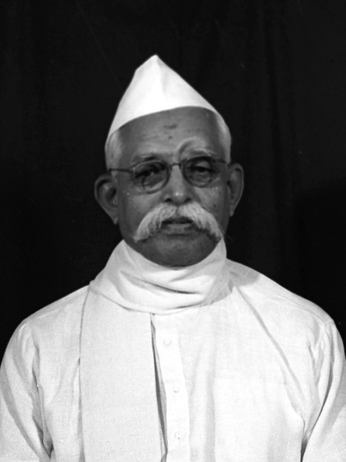
	First party	Second party
Leader	Ravishankar Shukla
Party	INC	KMPP
Leader's seat	Saraipali
Seats won	194	8
Popular vote	34,34,058	3,65,371
Percentage	49.07%	5.22%
Chief Minister before election
Ravishankar Shukla
Elected Chief Minister
Ravishankar Shukla
INC

Indian administrative divisions, as of 1951. Madhya Pradesh (in brown) in the center

Elections to the Madhya Pradesh Legislative Assembly were held on 26 March 1952. 1,122 candidates contested for the 184 constituencies in the Assembly. There were 48 two-member constituencies and 136 single-member constituencies, for a total of 232 seats. The Indian National Congress won a majority of seats and Ravishankar Shukla became the Chief Minister.

On 1 November 1956, under States Reorganisation Act, 1956, Madhya Bharat, Vindhya Pradesh, and Bhopal state were merged into Madhya Pradesh and the Marathi-speaking districts of Nagpur Division were transferred to Bombay State. Hence the constituencies were re-organized during 1957 elections.

== Results ==
Party	Votes	%	Seats
Indian National Congress	3,434,058	49.07	194
Socialist Party	661,874	9.46	2
Kisan Mazdoor Praja Party	365,371	5.22	8
Scheduled Castes Federation	283,554	4.05	0
Bharatiya Jana Sangh	250,247	3.58	0
Ram Rajya Parishad	175,324	2.51	3
S.K. Paksha	101,670	1.45	2
Forward Bloc (Ruikar)	45,487	0.65	0
Forward Bloc Marxist)	40,727	0.58	0
Communist Party of India	24,460	0.35	0
Independent	1,601,565	22.89	23
Others	13,251	0.19	0
Total	6,997,588	100.00	232

== State Reorganization ==
On 1 November 1956, under States Reorganisation Act, 1956, Madhya Bharat (except the Sunel enclave of the Mandsaur district), Vindhya Pradesh, Bhopal State and the Sironj sub-division of the Kota district of Rajasthan were merged into Madhya Pradesh while the Marathi-speaking districts of Nagpur division and Amravati division (namely Buldhana, Akola, Amravati, Yavatmal, Wardha, Nagpur, Bhandara and Chandrapur), were transferred to Bombay State. This resulted in increase in assembly constituencies from 184 with 232 seats to 218 constituencies with 288 seats during 1957 elections.

== Elected members ==
Constituency	Reserved for	Elected Member	Party
Manendragarh	None	Pritram Kurrey	Indian National Congress
Manendragarh	None	Jwalaprasad	Independent
Samri	ST	Sheobux Ram	Indian National Congress
Sitapur	ST	Haribhajan	Independent
Ambikapur	None	Thakur Parasnath	Independent
Ambikapur	None	Maharaj Ramanuj Saran Singh Deo	Indian National Congress
Pal	None	Bhandariram	Indian National Congress
Pal	None	Dharampal	Independent
Jashpurnagar	None	Johan	Kisan Mazdoor Praja Party
Jashpurnagar	None	Raja Vijai Bhushan Singh Deo	Akhil Bharatiya Ram Rajya Parishad
Dharamjaigarh	None	Budhnath Sai	Indian National Congress
Dharamjaigarh	None	Raja Sahab Alias Chandra Chur Prasad Singh Deo	Indian National Congress
Gharghoda	None	Raja Lalit Kumar Singh	Indian National Congress
Gharghoda	None	Durga Charan	Indian National Congress
Sakti	None	Leeladhar Singh	Independent
Raigarh	None	Baijnath	Indian National Congress
Sarangarh	None	Vedram	Indian National Congress
Sarangarh	None	Raja Naresh Chandra Singh	Indian National Congress
Chandrapur Birra	None	Mulchand	Independent
Chandrapur Birra	None	Gajanan	Indian National Congress
Baraduwar	None	Bisahudas Kunjram	Indian National Congress
Champa	None	Ram Krishna	Indian National Congress
Janjgir Pamgarh	None	Ganeshram	Indian National Congress
Janjgir Pamgarh	None	Mahadeo Murlidhar	Independent
Akaltara Masturi	None	Hazi Mohad. Masud Khan	Indian National Congress
Akaltara Masturi	None	Kulpatsingh	Indian National Congress
Bilaspur	None	Sheodulare Ramadhin	Indian National Congress
Pendra	None	M. B. Dube	Indian National Congress
Katghora	None	Banwarilal	Indian National Congress
Katghora	None	Aditya Pratap Singh	Indian National Congress
Rampur	ST	Rudrasaran Pratap Singh	Indian National Congress
Mungeli	None	Ramgopal Tiwari	Indian National Congress
Mungeli	None	Anjoredas	Indian National Congress
Pandaria	None	Padmraj Singh	Akhil Bharatiya Ram Rajya Parishad
Takhatpur	None	Chandra Bhushan Singh	Indian National Congress
Nargoda	None	Rameshwar Prasad	Indian National Congress
Kota	None	Kashiram Tiwari	Indian National Congress
Saraipali	None	Ravishankar Shukla	Indian National Congress
Basna	None	Jaideo Gadadhar	Indian National Congress
Pithora	None	Ganpatrao Dani	Indian National Congress
Mahasamund	None	Ajodhya Prasad	Indian National Congress
Rajim	None	Shyamkumari Devi	Indian National Congress
Deobhog	None	Gokeran Singh	Indian National Congress
Bhatapara Sitapur	None	Chakrapani Shukla	Indian National Congress
Bhatapara Sitapur	None	Bajirao Bihari	Indian National Congress
Kosamandi Kasdol	None	Brijlal	Kisan Mazdoor Praja Party
Kosamandi Kasdol	None	Naindas	Indian National Congress
Bhatgaon	None	Laxminarayan Das	Indian National Congress
Arang Kharora	None	Sukhchain Das	Indian National Congress
Arang Kharora	None	Lakhanlal Gupta	Indian National Congress
Gudhiyari	None	Mulchand	Indian National Congress
Pacheda	None	Khubchand Baghel	Kisan Mazdoor Praja Party
Raipur	None	Piarelal Singh	Kisan Mazdoor Praja Party
Kurud	None	Bhopal Rao	Indian National Congress
Dhamtari	None	Ram Gopal Sharma	Indian National Congress
Panduka	None	Tarachand	Indian National Congress
Dantewara	None	Boda	Independent
Bijapur	ST	Hirasha	Indian National Congress
Sukma	ST	Piloo	Independent
Chitrakote	ST	Dora	Independent
Jagdalpur	None	Doomer	Independent
Jagdalpur	None	Vidyanath	Independent
Keskal	ST	Rajman	Independent
Narayanpur	ST	Rameshwar	Indian National Congress
Kanker	None	Ratansingh	Independent
Kanker	None	Maharajadhiraj B. P. Deo	Independent
Chauki	None	Sujaniram	Indian National Congress
Balod	None	Darambai	Indian National Congress
Balod	None	K. L. Gumasta	Indian National Congress
Nandgaon	None	R. K. Shukla	Indian National Congress
Dongergaon	None	D. L. Jain	Indian National Congress
Dongergarh	None	Bijaylal	Indian National Congress
Khairgarh	None	Raja Bahadur Birendra Bahadur Singh	Indian National Congress
Bori Deoker	None	Rani Padmawati Devi	Indian National Congress
Bori Deoker	None	Bhootnath	Indian National Congress
Kuthari	None	Tilochan	Socialist Party
Pandhar	None	Udairam	Indian National Congress
Durg	None	G. S. Gupta	Indian National Congress
Bemetara	None	V. Y. Tamaskar	Independent
Bemetara	None	Jagtarandas	Indian National Congress
Gandai	None	Rituparna Kishordas	Independent
Kawardha	None	Gangaprasad	Akhil Bharatiya Ram Rajya Parishad
Nainpur Mohgaon	None	Akali Basori	Indian National Congress
Nainpur Mohgaon	None	Mahendralal Jagannathprasad Choudhari	Indian National Congress
Mandla Niwas	None	Roopnarayan Jhanaklal Chaturvedi	Indian National Congress
Mandla Niwas	None	Bhupatsingh Kariya	Indian National Congress
Dindori	None	Dwarikaprasad Anantram	Indian National Congress
Dindori	None	Roopsingh Umraosingh	Indian National Congress
Baihar	None	Nainsingh	Indian National Congress
Baihar	None	K. G. Naik	Indian National Congress
Balaghat	None	Kanhaiyalal	Indian National Congress
Lanji	None	Tejlal Tembhare	Indian National Congress
Katangi	None	Motiram Odakya	Indian National Congress
Katangi	None	Shankarlal Tiwari	Indian National Congress
Lalburra	None	Shantilal Jain	Indian National Congress
Waraseoni	None	Thansingh Bisen	Indian National Congress
Khurai	None	Gaya Prasad Mathura Prasad	Indian National Congress
Khurai	None	Ramlal Balchand	Indian National Congress
Sagar	None	Md. Shafi Mohammad Subrati	Indian National Congress
Surkhi	None	Jyotishi Jwala Prasad	Indian National Congress
Banda	None	Swami Krishnanand Ramcharan	Indian National Congress
Rechli	None	Balaprasad Balaji	Indian National Congress
Hatta	None	Kadora	Indian National Congress
Hatta	None	Dhagat Premshankar Laxmishankar	Indian National Congress
Tendukheda	None	Modi Raghuvir Gorelal	Indian National Congress
Damoh	None	Marothi Harichandra Laxmichandra	Indian National Congress
Bijaraghogarh	None	Laxmishankar	Indian National Congress
Rithi	None	Kunjilal	Indian National Congress
Murwara	None	Govindprasad Sharma	Indian National Congress
Sleemnabad	None	Basantkumar Mishra	Indian National Congress
Sihora	None	Kashiprasad	Indian National Congress
Majholi Panagar	None	Parmanand Bhai	Indian National Congress
Khamaria	None	Jagmohandas Maheshwari	Indian National Congress
Patan	None	Neknarayansingh	Indian National Congress
Jabalpur 1	None	Matua	Indian National Congress
Jabalpur 1	None	Jagdish Narayan	Indian National Congress
Jabalpur 2	None	Kunjilal	Indian National Congress
Lakhnadon	None	Durgashankar Mehta	Indian National Congress
Lakhnadon	None	Vasantrao	Indian National Congress
Kanhiwara	None	Manoharrao Jathar	Indian National Congress
Barghat	None	Ramrao Ubgade	Indian National Congress
Seoni	None	Dadu Mahendranath Singh	Indian National Congress
Amarwara	None	Narayan Maniramji Wadiwa	Indian National Congress
Amarwara	None	Arjunsingh Sisodia	Indian National Congress
Sausar	None	Jhingroo Poosay	Indian National Congress
Sausar	None	Nilkanthrao Zalke	Indian National Congress
Chhindwara	None	K. G. Rekhade	Indian National Congress
Tamia Parasia	None	Phulbhanu Shah	Independent
Tamia Parasia	None	Shanti Sarup	Indian National Congress
Gotegaon	None	Shyam Sunder Narain	Indian National Congress
Narsimpur	None	Sarladevi	Indian National Congress
Chichil	None	Shankarpratap Singh	Indian National Congress
Gadarwara	None	Niranjansingh	Kisan Mazdoor Praja Party
Piparia	None	Narayansingh	Indian National Congress
Sohagpur	None	Hariprasad	Indian National Congress
Hoshangabad	None	Nanhelal	Indian National Congress
Harda	None	Maheshdutta	Kisan Mazdoor Praja Party
Harda	None	Premnath	Kisan Mazdoor Praja Party
Burhanpur	None	A. Qadir Mohammad Masum	Indian National Congress
Shahpur	None	Gangacharan Biharilal	Indian National Congress
Khandwa	None	Mandloi Bhagwantrao Annabhau	Indian National Congress
Khandwa	None	Deokaran Balchand	Indian National Congress
Moondi	None	Kalusingh Shersingh	Indian National Congress
Hursud	None	Mishrilal Sand	Independent
Chicholi	ST	Mohakamsingh	Indian National Congress
Betul	None	Dipchand Gothi	Indian National Congress
Bhainsdehi	None	Anandrao Lokhande	Indian National Congress
Multai	None	Bhakru Kevbaji Patil	Indian National Congress
Katol	None	Shankarrao Daulatrao Gedam	Indian National Congress
Sawargaon	None	Sheshrao Krishnaji Wankhede	Indian National Congress
Saoner	None	Narendra Mahipati Tidke	Indian National Congress
Kamptee	None	Bajrangji Lahanu Kadu Thekedar	Indian National Congress
Nagpur 1	None	Madangopal Jodharaj Agarwal	Indian National Congress
Nagpur 2	None	Dindayal Nandram Gupta	Indian National Congress
Nagpur 3	None	Vidyavatibai Panonalal Dewadia	Indian National Congress
Nagpur 4	None	Mancharsha Rustomji Awari	Kisan Mazdoor Praja Party
Nagpur 4	None	Vinayak Jagnnath Changole	Indian National Congress
Hingna	None	Mohd. Abdulla Khan Pathan	Indian National Congress
Umrer	None	Ramchandra Pandurang Lanjewar	Indian National Congress
Ramtek	None	Lalendra Ramchandra Wasnik	Indian National Congress
Ramtek	None	Chintamanrao Govind Tidke	Indian National Congress
Tumsar	None	Narayan Sambhuji Karemore	Socialist Party
Mohadi	None	Prabhavatibai Jaywant Jakadar	Indian National Congress
Bhandara	None	Rama Bakaram Lanjewar	Indian National Congress
Lakhandur	None	Sitaram Jairam Bhambore	Indian National Congress
Lakhandur	None	Krishnarao Dagoji Thakur	Indian National Congress
Sakoli	None	Arjun Ganaji Sanrit	Indian National Congress
Sakoli	None	Nashik Khantadu Tirpude	Indian National Congress
Tirora	None	Shaligram Ramratan Dixit	Indian National Congress
Goregaon	None	Pannalal Beharilal Dube	Indian National Congress
Amgaon	None	Girdharilal Chaturbhui Sharma	Indian National Congress
Gondia	None	Manoharbhai Babarbhai	Indian National Congress
Kampth	None	Kaushalnath Laxmichand Bhise	Indian National Congress
Bramhapuri	None	Murarirao Krishnarao Nagmoti	Indian National Congress
Parada	None	Narayan Sampatsingh Uike	Independent
Gadhachiroli Sironcha	None	Kirtimantrao Bhujangrao	Indian National Congress
Gadhachiroli Sironcha	None	Namdeorao Balaji Poreddiwar	Indian National Congress
Gondpipri	None	Ramchandra Vasudeo Kathade	Indian National Congress
Mul	None	Marotirao Sambhshiv Kannamwar	Indian National Congress
Chanda	None	Laxman Krishnaji Wasekar	Indian National Congress
Shankarpur Sindewahi	None	Pandurang Antaram Chunarkar	Indian National Congress
Shankarpur Sindewahi	None	Dattu Tukaram Thakre	Indian National Congress
Bhadrawati	None	Ramrao Krishnarao Patil	Indian National Congress
Warora	None	Mahadeo Nagorao Pawade	Indian National Congress
Hinganghat	None	Ramkisandas Motilal Mohota	Indian National Congress
Sindi	None	Bapurao Marotrao Deshmukh	Indian National Congress
Wardha	None	Shantabai Narulkar	Indian National Congress
Deoli	None	Shankar Vithal Sonavane	Indian National Congress
Deoli	None	Mahadeo Tukaram Thakre	Indian National Congress
Arvi	None	Jagjiwan Ganpatrao Kadam	Indian National Congress
Jarud	None	Ramkrishna Atmaram Belsare	Indian National Congress
Morsi	None	Punjabrao Balkrishna Sadatpure	Independent
Chandur	None	Pundlik Balkrishna Chore	Indian National Congress
Talegaon	None	Bhaurao Gulabrao Jadheo	Indian National Congress
Amravati	None	Wamanrao Gopalrao Joshi	Indian National Congress
Amravati	None	Babulal Kashiprasad	Indian National Congress
Nandgaon	None	Punjabrao Bapurao Yawalikar	Indian National Congress
Achalpur	None	Amritrao Ganpatrao Sonar	Indian National Congress
Melghat	None	Balkrishna Mulchand Bhandari	Indian National Congress
Daryapur	None	Kokilabai Gawande	Indian National Congress
Daryapur	None	Kisan Narayan Khandare	Indian National Congress
Walgaon	None	Purshottam Kashirao Deshmukh	Indian National Congress
Mehkar	None	Anandrao Marotrao Pawar	Indian National Congress
Mehkar	None	Laxman Thakuji Gawai	S. K. Paksha
Chikhli	None	Trimbak Bhikaji Khedkar	Independent
Buldana	None	Namdeo Punjaji Pawar	Indian National Congress
Malkapur	None	Bhiku Fikira Shelki	Indian National Congress
Nandura	None	Jalamsingh Supad Ingale	Indian National Congress
Khamgaon	None	Purushottam Govind Ekbote	Indian National Congress
Shegaon	None	Tukaram Ganpat Khumkar	Indian National Congress
Jalgaon	None	Kashirao Patil	S. K. Paksha
Washim	None	Shankar Sadashiv Kulkarni	Indian National Congress
Washim	None	Maroti Kashiram Kairade	Indian National Congress
Balapur	None	Dagdu Zangoji Palaspagar	Indian National Congress
Balapur	None	Ghiyasuddin Nasiruddin Kazi	Indian National Congress
Mangrulpir	None	Babarao Anandrao Deshmukh	Indian National Congress
Akot	None	Saqui Niyaji Mohd. Subhan	Indian National Congress
Ugwa	None	Radhadevi Kisanlal Goenka	Indian National Congress
Akola	None	Brijlal Nandlal Biyani	Indian National Congress
Muetizapur	None	Shamrao Deorao Dhotre	Indian National Congress
Karanja	None	Vithalsinha Jaisinha Thakur	Indian National Congress
Fusad	None	Vasantrao Fulsingh Naik	Indian National Congress
Fusad	None	Daulat Laxman Khadse	Indian National Congress
Darwha	None	Deorao Sheoram Patil	Independent
Kalamb	None	Narayan Zuglaji Nandurkar	Indian National Congress
Yeotmal	None	Tarachand Shermal Surana	Indian National Congress
Wadhona	None	Shridhar Anthoba Jawade	Indian National Congress
Pandharkaoda	None	Dattatraya Krishnarao Deshmukh	Indian National Congress
Maragaon	None	Shioraya Krishnaya Gangashettiwar	Indian National Congress
Wani	None	Deorao Yeshwantrao Gohakar	Indian National Congress
Digras	None	Alihasan Jiwabhai Mamdani	Indian National Congress

== See also ==
- 1951–52 elections in India
- 1952 Madhya Bharat Legislative Assembly election
- 1952 Bhopal Legislative Assembly election
- 1952 Vindhya Pradesh Legislative Assembly election
- 1957 Madhya Pradesh Legislative Assembly election
