= Central Provinces and Berar =

Province of British India, and later, Dominion of India (1903–1950)

Coordinates: 21.15°N 79.09°E

- Province of British India
- 1903–1950
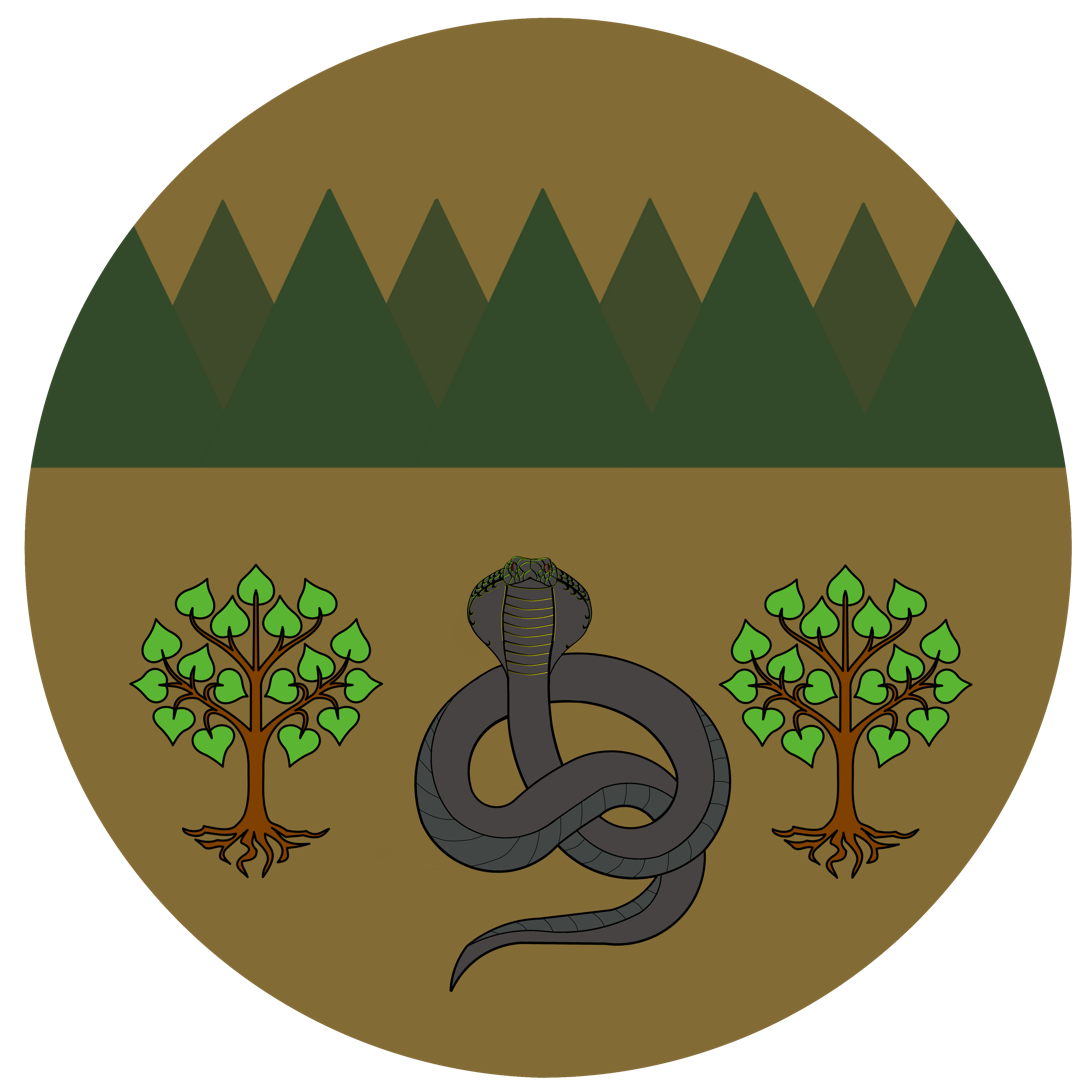
- Flag Coat of arms

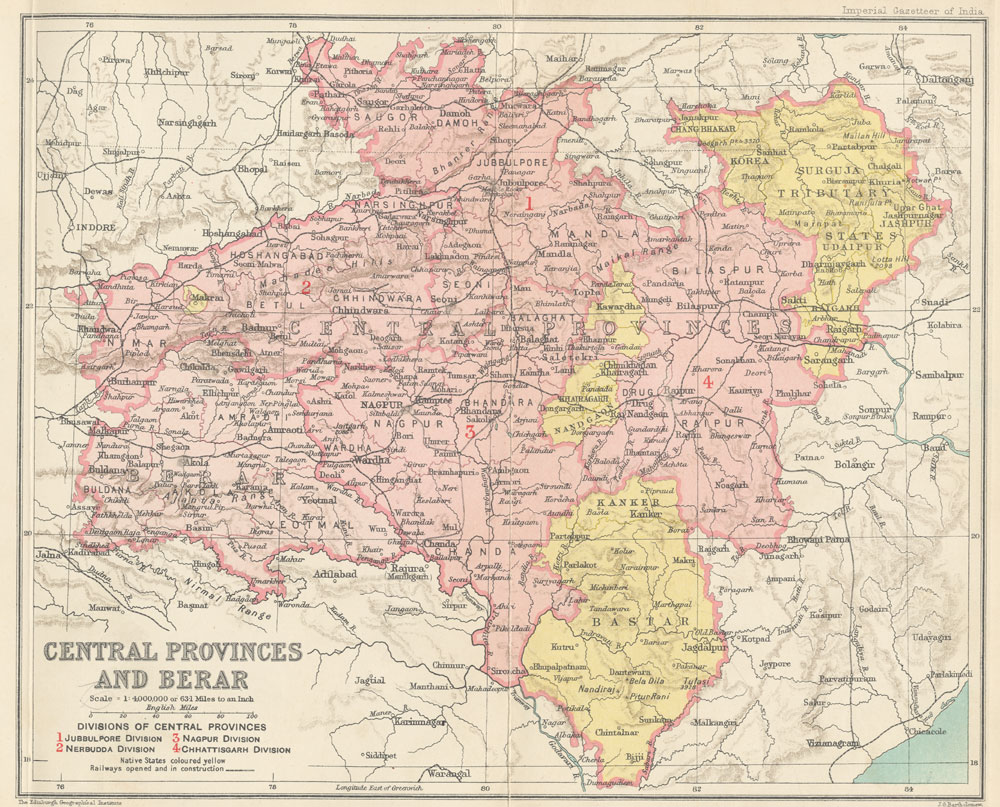
- Central Provinces and Berar in 1909, showing the districts, divisions, and princely states under the authority of the province, as well as the 1905 changes to the eastern boundary
- Capital: Nagpur
- Population
  - 1941: 16,813,584
- History
  - Merger of the Central Provinces and Berar Province: 1903
  - Creation of Madhya Bharat State: 1950
Preceded by	Succeeded by
Central Provinces; Berar Province	Madhya Pradesh; Maharashtra

The Central Provinces and Berar was a province of British Raj and later the Dominion of India which existed from 1903 to 1950. It was formed by the merger of the Central Provinces with the province of Berar, which was territory leased by the British from the Hyderabad State. Through an agreement signed on 5 November 1902, 6th Nizam Mahbub Ali Khan, Asaf Jah VI leased Berar permanently to the British for an annual payment of 25 lakhs rupees. Lord Curzon decided to merge Berar with the Central Provinces, and this was proclaimed on 17 September 1903.

The Central Provinces was formed in 1861 by the merger of the Saugor and Nerbudda Territories and Nagpur Province. Administration of the Berar region of the Hyderabad princely state was assigned to the Chief Commissioner of the Central Provinces in 1903, and for administrative purposes, Berar was merged with the Central Provinces to form the Central Provinces and Berar on 24 October 1936. After Indian Independence in 1947, a number of princely states were merged into the Central Provinces and Berar, which, when the Constitution of India went into effect in 1950, became the new Indian state of Madhya Bharat, merged with Madhya Pradesh in 1956, also meaning Central Province.

As its name suggests, the province was situated in the center of the Indian peninsula. It comprised large portions of the broad belt of hill and plateau which interposes between the plains of the Ganges and the Deccan Plateau. The Central Provinces and Berar were bounded on the north and northeast by the Central India Agency, including the Bundelkhand and Bagelkhand agencies, and along the northern edge of Saugor District by the United Provinces; on the west by the princely states of Bhopal, Gwalior & Indore and by the Khandesh District of Bombay Presidency; on the south by Hyderabad State, and on the east by Orissa (till 1936, a part of Bihar and Orissa Province) and the Eastern States Agency.

== History ==
=== British India ===
The Central Provinces comprised 19th-century British conquests from the Mughals and Marathas in central India, and covered much of present-day Chhattisgarh with portions of Madhya Pradesh, and Maharashtra states. Its capital was Nagpur.

After the defeat of the Marathas in the Third Anglo-Maratha War, the territories north of the Satpura Range ceded in 1817 by the Maratha Peshwa (parts of Saugor and Damoh) and in 1818 by Appa Sahib, were in 1820, formed into the Saugor and Nerbudda Territories under an agent to the governor-general. In 1835 the Saugor and Nerbudda Territories were included in the newly formed North-Western Provinces (which later became the United Provinces of Agra & Oudh). In 1842, in consequence of an uprising, they were again placed under the jurisdiction of an agent to the governor-general. They were restored to the North-Western Province in 1853.

In 1818, the Maratha Bhonsle Maharajas of Nagpur submitted to British sovereignty. In 1853, on the death of Raghoji III without heirs, Nagpur was annexed by the British under the doctrine of lapse. Until the formation of the Central Provinces in 1861, Nagpur Province, which consisted of the Nagpur Division, Chhindwara and Chhattisgarh, was administered by a commissioner under the central colonial government.

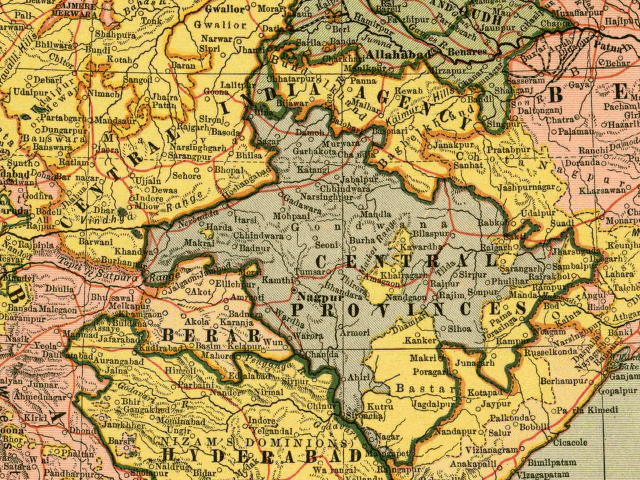
Central Provinces and Berar, 1903. Princely states are shown in yellow.

The Saugor and Nerbudda Territories were joined with the Nagpur province to constitute the new Central Provinces in 1861. on 1 October 1903 Berar was placed under the administration of the commissioner of the Central Provinces. In October 1905, most of Sambalpur and the princely states of Bamra, Rairakhol, Sonpur, Patna, and Kalahandi were transferred from the Central Provinces and Berar to Bengal, while the Hindi-speaking Chota Nagpur States of Chang Bhakar, British Korea, Surguja, Udaipur, and Jashpur were transferred from Bengal to the Central Provinces & Berar.

In 1903, the Marathi-speaking Berar region of the Hyderabad princely state was placed under the administration of the Governor of the Central Provinces, although it officially remained part of Hyderabad, leased in perpetuity by the Government of India. In 1905, most of Sambalpur district and the princely states of Bamra, Rairakhol, Sonpur, Patna, and Kalahandi were transferred to Bengal Province and the princely states of Changbhakar, Korea, Surguja, Udaipur, and Jashpur were transferred from Bengal to the Central Provinces.

The Government of India Act 1912 permitted the creation of legislative councils for provinces under a chief commissioner, and on 8 November 1913, the Central Provinces Legislative Council was formed. The Government of India Act 1919 changed the administrator of the province from a chief commissioner to a governor, and enlarged the legislative council and expanded the voting franchise.

The first elections for the Legislative Council under the 1919 Montagu–Chelmsford Reforms were in November and December 1920. The Council consisted of 71 members - 53 elected members, 2 ex-officio members (members of Executive Council), and 16 official and non-official nominated members (Zamindar owners declared as backward, Depressed Classes, Europeans and Anglo-Indians). Out of the 53 elected members, 40 came from general constituencies (30 rural and 10 urban), 7 communal constituencies and 6 special constituencies (Central Provinces & Berar Mining Association, Central Provinces & Berar Commerce & Industry Association, Berar Commerce & Industry, and Central Provinces & Berar Landholders). The Indian National Congress had decided at its Calcutta Conference to boycott the elections as part of the Non-cooperation Movement, and many prominent nationalist leaders, including Ravishankar Shukla, E. Raghavendra Rao, B. S. Moonje, Daulat Singh, Makhan Lal Chaturvedi, and Vishnudutta Shukla, either decided not to run, or withdrew their candidacies. The legislative seats went mostly to Liberals and Loyalists. Gangadhar Rao Chitnavis was nominated as the President of the Council.

The Montagu-Chelmsford reforms also introduced the principle of dyarchy, whereby certain responsibilities such as agriculture, health, education, and local government, were transferred to elected ministers but some responsibilities such as home, finance and revenue were reserved with the Members of the Executive Council of the Governor. Some of the Indians who served as members of the Governor's Executive Council were Moropant Vishvanath Joshi (Home) and E. Raghavendra Rao.

By 1923, the nationalists had decided to participate in the legislative elections, and in the November and December 1923 election, and the Swaraj Party, which advocated Indian independence, won 41 of the 54 elected seats. 4 seats went to independents who generally allied with the Swarajists, four to the Liberals, and five to independents allied with the Liberals. The Swarajists were led by B. S. Moonje from Vidarbha, E. Raghavendra Rao from Mahakoshal, and S. B. Tambe and B. G. Khaparde of Berar. S. M. Chitnavis was leader of the Liberals. Despite winning a majority of seats, the Swarajists, consistent with the party's policy of obstruction and non-acceptance of office, refused to form a government, and Governor Frank Sly selected Chitnavis and Syed Hifazat Ali, a Muslim independent, as ministers.

In the 1926 election, the Swarajists split, with one faction continuing with the policies of obstruction and non-acceptance of office, while the Responsive Cooperation Party which chose to participate in government. After the election B. S. Moonje formed a ministry by uniting Responsive Cooperation, Independent Congress, Liberal, and independent legislators into a National Party, with 33 members.

The ministry collapsed in 1933 due to infighting among the ministers and a new ministry was formed under Raghavendra Rao with Muhammad Yusuf Shareef and V. B. Choubal as ministers. This ministry collapsed in 1934 and a new ministry was formed with B. G. Khaparde as Chief Minister and K. S. Naidu as the other minister. This ministry remained in office till 1937.

In 1933, the princely states in Chhattisgarh Division were transferred to the Eastern States Agency, and Makrai to the Central India Agency. On 24 October 1936, the Central Provinces became the Central Provinces and Berar when it was fully merged with Berar Division, although it remained under the nominal sovereignty of Hyderabad.

In 1935, the Government of India Act was passed by the British Parliament. This act provided for the election of a provincial assembly, with an electorate made up of men with a minimum of financial resources, and excluding women and the poor. Supervisory powers over the enclaved and attached Princely States were reserved to the Governor and removed from the authority of the popular provincial governments. Elections were held in 1937, and the Indian National Congress took a majority of the seats but declined to form the government. A minority provisional government was formed under E. Raghavendra Rao.

Minister	Portfolio
E. Raghavendra Rao	Gaol, Police, Political, Military, Judicial, and Legal
Balkrishna Ganesh Khaparde	Revenue, Land Records, Survey, Settlement, Forest, Excise, Stamp, and Education
Syed Wakil Ahmed Rizvi	Finance, Local Self-Government, Medical, Public Health, and Public Works
Dharamrao Bhujangrao	Agriculture, Commerce, Industry, and Registration

The Congress reversed its decision and resolved to accept office in July 1937. Therefore, the Governor invited N. B. Khare to form the government in August 1937.

Minister	Portfolio
N. B. Khare	Premier, Home
Yusuf Shareef	Law and Justice
P. B. Gole	Revenue
Ramrao Deshmukh	Public Works
Ravi Shankar Shukla	Education
Dwarka Prasad Mishra	Local Self-government
D. K. Mehta	Finance

Khare resigned in 1938, and Ravi Shankar Shukla next became Premier. In 1939, along with Congress leaders from other provinces, Shukla resigned in protest of the Governor-General's declaration of war on Germany without consulting with Indian leaders, and the Central Provinces & Berar came under Governor's Rule. Another round of elections were held in 1946, yielding another Congress majority, and Shukla again became Premier.

=== After Indian independence ===
India became independent on 15 August and the Central Provinces & Berar became a province of the Dominion of India. The princely states, which were under the Central Provinces before 1936, were merged into the province, and organised into new districts. When the Constitution of India went into effect in 1950, the Central Provinces & Berar was reorganised with territorial changes as the state of Madhya Pradesh, which name also means Central Province.

On 1 November 1956, Madhya Bharat, together with the states of Vindhya Pradesh and Bhopal State, was merged into Madhya Pradesh. In 1956, strong demand due to linguistic similarity from Marathi Irredentists, the Berar and Nagpur divisions were transferred to Bombay State. In 1960, the Bombay State was partitioned into Maharashtra & Gujarat. In 2000, the eastern portion of Madhya Pradesh was split off to become the new state of Chhattisgarh.

== Demographics ==
The 1911 census counted a population of 16,033,310 for the Central Provinces and Berar. Droughts in 1917 and 1920 caused famine in several districts, and the Central Provinces were affected by bubonic plague in 1911, 1912, 1915, 1917, and 1918, and by the 1918 influenza pandemic. In the 1921 census, the population declined by 0.3% from 1911 to 15,970,660.

The 1931 census found a total population of 17,990,937 for the Central Provinces and Berar - 12,065,885 for the British districts, 3,441,838 for Berar, and 2,483,214 in the princely states.

== Administration ==
The 1941 Census of India counted 16,813,584 persons in the province, of which 2,093,767 were urban and 14,719,817 were rural.

=== Districts ===
The Central provinces and Berar was made up of 22 districts, grouped into five divisions :

- Jubbulpore (Jabalpur) Division (18,950 sq mi, 49,100 km^{2}), which included Jubbulpore, Saugor (Sagar), Damoh, Seoni, and Mandla districts.
- Nerbudda (Narmada) Division (18,382 sq mi, 47,610 km^{2}), which included Narsinghpur, Hoshangabad, Nimar, Betul, and Chhindwara districts.
- Nagpur Division (23,521 sq mi, 60,920 km^{2}), which included Nagpur, Bhandara, Chanda, Wardha, and Balaghat districts.
- Chhattisgarh Division (21,240 sq mi, 55,000 km^{2}), which included Bilaspur, Raipur, and Durg (created 1905) districts.
- Berar Division, which included Amravati, Akola, Ellichpur, Buldhana, Basim, and Wun districts.

=== Princely States ===
The Central provinces and Berar included also 15 princely states, whose native rulers enjoyed indirect rule under British protection.

Salute states, in order of precendence :

- Kalahandi (Karond), title Maharaja, Hereditary salute of 9-guns
- Patna, title Maharaja, Hereditary salute of 9-guns
- Sonepur, title Maharaja, Hereditary salute of 9-guns

Non-salute states, alphabetically :

- Bamra, title Raja
- Bastar, title (Maha) Raja
- Chhuikandan (Kondka), title Mahant
- Kanker, title Raja
- Kawardha, title Thakur
- Khairagarh, title Raja
- Makrai, title Raja (from 1899, Raja Hathiya Rai)
- (Raj) Nandgaon, title Mahant
- Raigarh, title Raja Bahadur
- Rairakhol State, title Raja
- Sakti, title Rana
- Sarangarh, title Raja

== See also ==
- Central Provinces
- Berar Province
- List of governors of the Central Provinces and Berar
