= Mahasamund =

- City
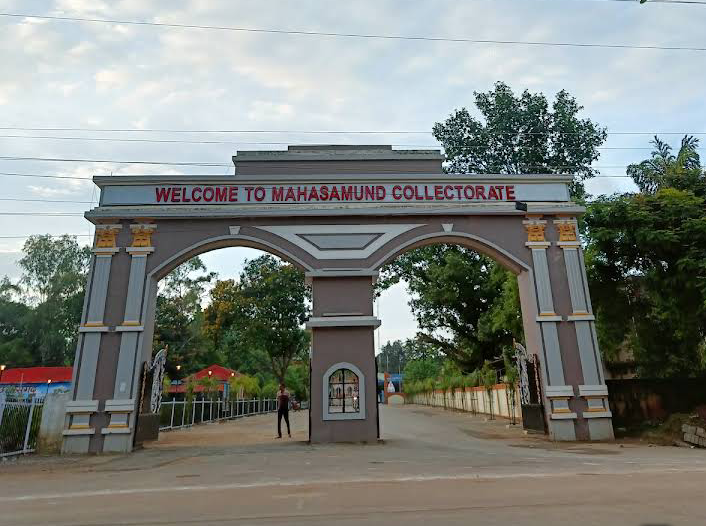
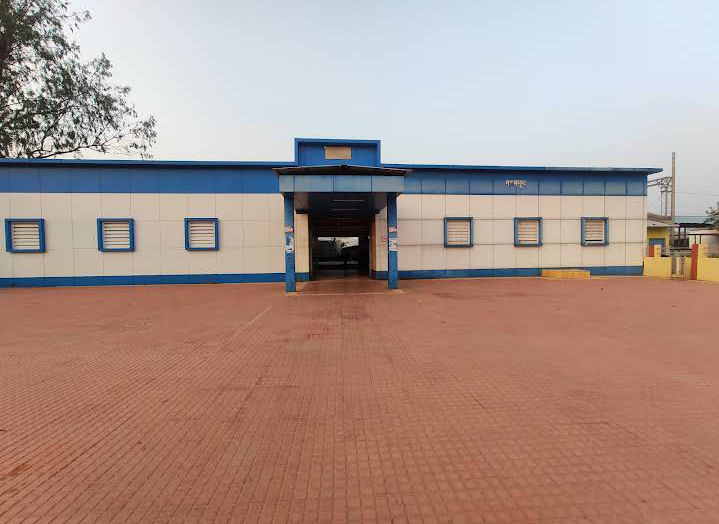
- Collectorate Mahasamund Mahasamund Railway Station

- Location in Chhattisgarh, India Mahasamund (India)
- Coordinates: 21.11°N 82.10°E
- Country: India
- State: Chhattisgarh
- District: Mahasamund
- Elevation: 318 m (1,043 ft)

Population (2011)
  - Total: 54,413

Languages
  - Official: Hindi, Chhattisgarhi
- Time zone: UTC+5:30 (IST)
- 493445: 493445 (Mahasamund)
- Vehicle registration: C.G.06

Mahasamund is a city in Mahasamund District in the Indian state of Chhattisgarh. It is situated on the Mumbai-Kolkata and Raipur-Visakhapatnam National Highways. It is one of the largest (ranked 11th) and most important cities in the State. The city is divided into 30 wards and 5 zones and is also the biggest city in the Trans-Mahanadi area. It is also the administrative headquarters of the Mahasamund District and part of the proposed new Mahasamund Municipal Corporation. The current president of Mahasamund Municipal Council is Nikhilkant Sahu of the Indian National Congress, who won the 2025 municipal election.

== History ==
The territory where Mahasamund is located was once controlled by the Kalachuri dynasty and the Maratha Empire. The region around the city was historically a center of learning and the capital of South Kosal under the rule of Somvansiya Emperors.

== Geography ==
Mahasamund is located at 21.1°N 82.1°E. It has an average elevation of 318 metres (1043 feet). Mahasamund is 56 kilometres south-east of Raipur on the junction of National Highway 6 and National Highway 217 close to the Mahanadi River. Mahasamund city is an important station on the Raipur-Vizag rail route. Mahasamund and Raipur are the only district headquarter cities which are close to the state capital of Chhattisgarh, Naya Raipur.

== Demographics ==
As of the 2011 Indian census, Mahasamund has a population of 54,413. Males constitute 51% of the population and females constitute 49%. Mahasamund has an average literacy rate of 70%; male literacy is 79% and female literacy is 61%. 14% of the population is under 6 years of age. The estimated population in 2014 is above one lakh.

== Transport ==
Mahasamund is 55 kilometres from Raipur, 105 kilometres from Dhamtari, 30 kilometres from Rajim, 160 kilometres from Bilaspur, 95 kilometres from Durg, 85 kilometres from Bhilai, 115 kilometres from Saraipali, 180 kilometres from Bargarh and 250 kilometres from Sambalpur.

=== Bus ===
Guru Ghasi Das bus terminal in Mahasamund is well connected to its nearby cities. There are regular bus services to Raipur, Bilaspur, DurgSaraipali, Baloda Bazar Bemetara, Simga, Rajim, Narshinghnath (Odisha) Sarangarh, Gariaband, Khariar Road, Nuapada, Berhampur, Asika and Bhawanipatna.

=== Rail ===
Mahasamund has two railway stations: the Mahasamund railway station and the Belsonda station. The Mahasamund railway station is an important station on the East Coast Railway zone. Doubling of the railway track from Raipur Mahasamund to Titilagarh has been completed and electric engine started running in 2019.

Mahasamund railway station is situated on the Raipur Vishakhapatnam railway line. There are regular trains for Bhubaneswar, Puri, Vishakhapatnam, Durg, Raipur, Bilaspur, Korba, Nagpur, Mumbai, Delhi, Bhopal, Titilagarh, Sambalpur, Bargarh, Ahmedabad, Gandhidham, New Delhi, Tirupati, Shirdi, Vijayawada, Agra, Itarsi, Bhusawal, Nanded, Jodhpur, Katni, Sagar, Shahdol and Anuppur.

=== Air ===
Swami Vivekananda Airport Raipur is just 40 kilometres south-east from Mahasamund.

=== Roads ===
Mahasamund is well connected to major Indian cities through National Highway 6 and National Highway 217. The construction of improving National Highway 6 to a four-lane road from Mahasamund to Odisha is in progress.

=== City bus ===
The state government approved a city bus project in Mahasamund City. Under the Jnurm scheme, the city government sanctioned a 9 single-decker city bus for Mahasamund City.

== Entertainment ==
Mahasamund has two cinemas, Vithoba Cineplex and ShriRam Talkies.

== Education ==
Mahasamund City is the educational hub for the nearby areas. Some of the leading institutes are

- Weidner memorial Senior Secondary School CBSE Pattern
- Kendriya Vidyalaya, CBSE Pattern B.T.I. road Mahasamund.
- Kendriya Vidyalaya, Balsi, Saraipali, CBSE PATTERN
- Honeydew School, Ramantola, Mahasamund.
- New Holy Faith School CBSE Pattern Pitiyajhar Mahasamund.
- Maharishi Public School CBSE Pattern Machewa Mahasamund.
- Saraswati Higher Secondary School CG Board Bhalesar Road Mahasamund.
- Shishu Sanskar Kendra Higher Secondary School CG Board College Road Mahasamund.
- Good Shepherd Higher Secondary School CG Board Ayodhya Nagar Mahasamund.
- Shyam Vidya Higher Secondary School CG Board Ayodhya Nagar Mahasamund.
- DMS Higher Secondary School CG Board
- Vrindavan Higher Secondary School CG Board Imlibhatha Mahasamund.
- Mata Gayatri Higher Secondary School CG Board Nayapara Mahasamund.
- Ashi Bai Golcha Girls Higher Secondary School CG Board Lohiya Chowk Mahasamund.
- Govt. Model Boys Higher Secondary School CG Board Nehru Chowk Mahasamund.
- Chhattisgarh Higher Secondary School CG Board NH 353 Bagbahra Road Mahasamund.
- Dream India Public School CBSE Pattern Baronda Chowk Mahasamund.
- Chandroday Public School NH 353 Bagbahra Road Mahasamund.
- Riverdale World School Pitiyajhar Mahasamund.
- Green Valley School Ashram Complex Mahasamund.
- Carmel Public School, Pitiyajhar Mahasamund.
- Sanskar Public School College Road Mahasamund.
- Jagannathi High School Station Road Mahasamund.

=== Colleges ===
- Mahasamund Medical College, officially Government Medical College, Mahasamund,
- Mahaprabhu Vallabhcharya Govt. PG College, Machewa Mahasamund.
- Mata Karma Govt. PG Girls College, Machewa Mahasamund.
- Shantri Bai Arts;Science and Commerce College, Bagbahra Road NH 353 Mahasamund.
- Govt. College of Agriculture and Research Station, Kanpa, Post-Birkoni, District-Mahasamund.
- Jai Hind College, Bhalesar Road Mahasamund.
- Govt. Polytechnic College, Baronda Bazar Mahasamund.
- Govt. Veterinary Hospital and Polytechnic College, Baronda Bazar Mahasamund.
- Govt. Livelihood College, Baronda Bazar Mahasamund.
- Indian College, Belsonda Raipur Road Mahasamund.
- Shyam B ED College Ayodhya Nagar Mahasamund.
- Govt. Forest Guard Training Centre Near Collectorate Mahasamund.

== Economy ==
The economy of Mahasamund is based on agriculture and mining. Rice is the main crop grown here. The black stone of this area is mined for tiles; Mahasamund also has many stone-cutting factories. The industrial area of Birkoni and Belsonda is just 10 and 05 km respectively.

== Culture and religion ==
About 90 percent population of the city follow Hinduism. People from all over India have settled here.

== Politics ==
Mahasamund is one of the 11 parliament constituency in the state of Chhattisgarh. This constituency is the seat of former Union Minister Vidya Charan Shukla who contested 12 "lok sabha" elections in which he won 11 and lost 1 against first Chief Minister Ajit Jogi. In the 2014 general election Ajit Jogi lost the election against BJP candidate Chandu Lal Sahu.

The assembly segments are Mahasamund, Saraipali, Basna, Khallari, Bindranawagarh, Rajim, Dhamtari, and Kurud.

The Member of the Legislative Assembly from Mahasamund constituency is Yogeshwar Raju Sinha of the Bharatiya Janata Party, who won the seat in the 2023 Chhattisgarh Legislative Assembly election.

== Tourism ==
Tourist sites in and around Mahasamund include Sirpur, the ancient capital of South Kosal and famous for its Lakshman temple, Buddha Vihar and many archaeological sites. The state government has decided to develop this area as a World Heritage site. Other nearby tourist sites include Kodar Dam, Rajim Kumbh, Rajiv Lochan Temple, and Khallari Temple. The birthplace of Mahaprabhu Vallabhacharya is in nearby Champaran.

== Localities ==
- Ayodhya Nagar
- Vardhman Nagar
- RamRahim Nagar
- Imlibhatha
- NayaPara
- Shankar Nagar
- Trimurti Colony
- Shubhash Nagar
- Laldharhi Para
- Club Para
- Aadarsh Nagar
- Pitiyajhar
- Mahamaya Para
- Mahavir Park
- Shivalik Park
- Jagat Vihar Colony, also known as Kaushik Colony
- Shri Ram Vatika
- Megh Basant
- Civil Line
- New Civil Line
- Mahavir Colony
- Punjabi Para
- Gujrati Para
- Naya Rawan bhatha Para
- Chipiya Para
- Khaira
- Bemcha
- Labhra
- Purana Rawan bhatha Para
- Machewa
- Bemcha
- Housing Board Colony
- RamanTola
- Mahauri Bhatha
- ShriRam colony
- Gudru Para
- Purani Basti
- Beldar Para
- Sanjay Nagar
- Auto Colony
- IsaiPara
- Ganjpara
- Purana Machali Market
