= Mahasamund district =

Coordinates: 21°06′N 82°06′E

- District of Chhattisgarh
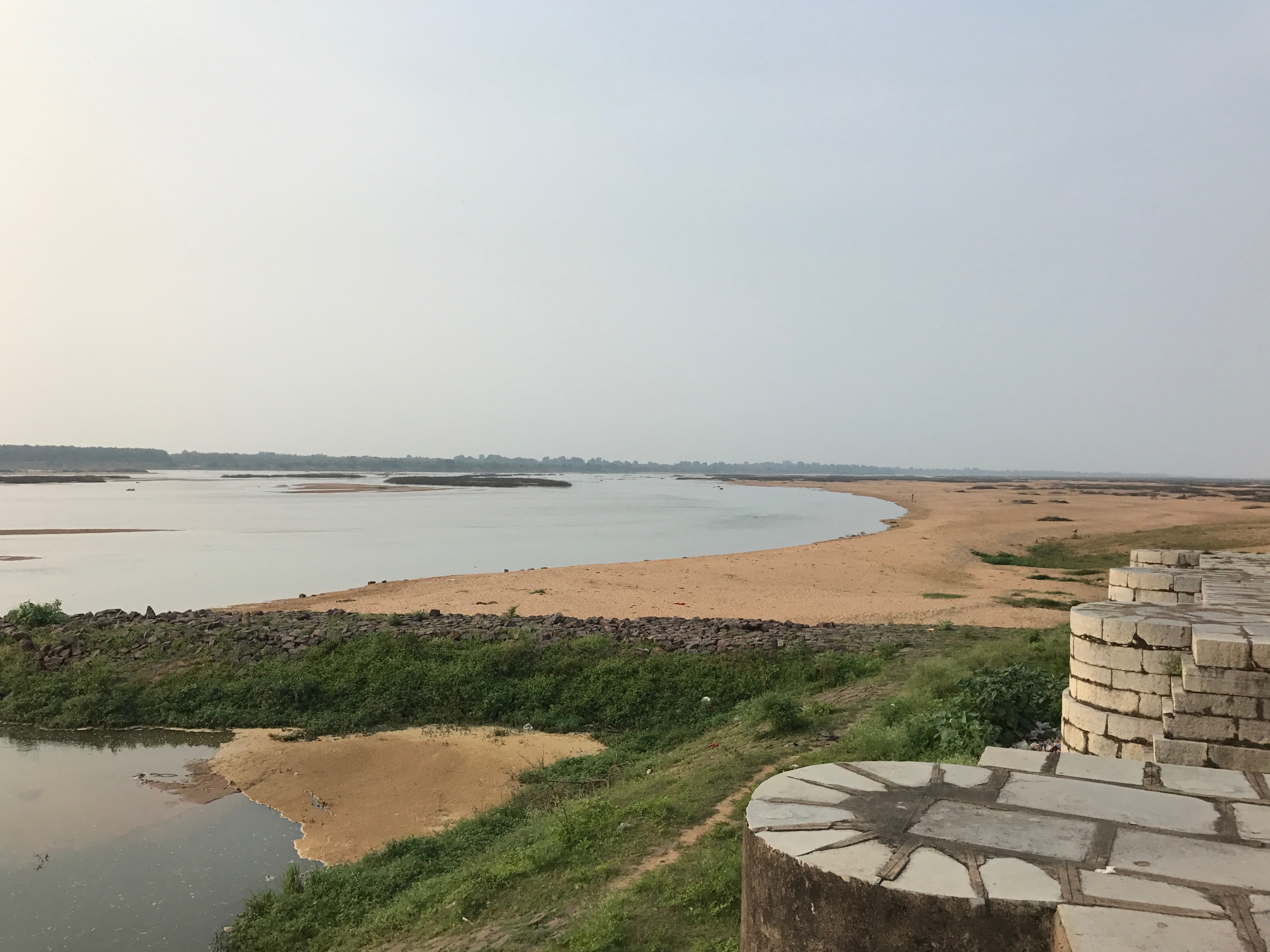
- View of the Mahanadi from the temples at Sirpur
- Interactive map of Mahasamund district
- Country: India
- State: Chhattisgarh
- Division: Raipur
- Headquarters: Mahasamund

Government
  - Lok Sabha constituencies: Mahasamund

Area
  - Total: 3,902 km^{2} (1,507 sq mi)

Population (2011)
  - Total: 1,032,754
  - Density: 264.7/km^{2} (685.5/sq mi)

Demographics
  - Literacy: 67.64
- Time zone: UTC+05:30 (IST)
- Website: mahasamund.nic.in

Mahasamund district is a district in Chhattisgarh state in central India. The city of Mahasamund is the district headquarters. The district is particularly famous for the historical temple town of Sirpur besides the Mahanadi river.

The present collector of Mahasamund is Mr Vinay Kumar Langeh, IAS.

== Geography ==
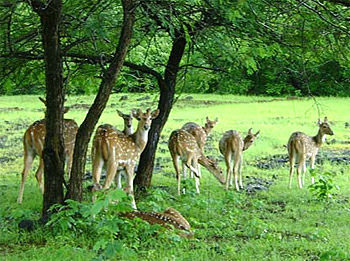
Spotted deer herd in Barnawapara Wildlife Sanctuary in the district

Mahasamund district covers an area of 3902.39 km² in the central eastern part of Chhattisgarh. The district lies between 20°47' to 21°31'30" latitude and 82°00' and 83°15'45" longitude. On the north the district is bounded by Raigarh and Baloda Bazar districts, on the south by Bargarh and Nuapada districts of Odisha, and on the west by Gariaband and Raipur districts.

Granite can be found in the Bagbahra, Basna and Pithora region. Rocks are predominantly limestone of the Chhattisgarh group contemporary to the Cuddapah group of the Upper Precambrian age, consisting of limestone layers, shale, sandstone, or quartzite. Neo-granite, dolerite, and quartz in intrusive forms are also found in the district. Hence there is a great scope of intense mining activity.

== Transportation ==
Mahasamund district has three National Highways: National Highway 6 National Highway 217 National Highway 216. The construction of four-lane road in National Highway 6 from Arang–Mahasamund to Saraipali up to Bargarh Sambalpur Odisha has been completed.

== Railway ==
Mahasamund railway station is an important station of the East Coast Railway zone. Mahasamund station is well connected to Raipur, Durg, Nagpur, Mumbai, Delhi, Bhopal, Gwalior, Sambalpur, Titlagarh, Visakhapatnam, Tirupati, Puri, Bilaspur, Korba, Jodhpur, Ajmer, Ahmedabad, etc., through the Indian Railways system.

== Demographics ==
Religions in Mahasamund district (2011)
Religion	Percent
Hinduism	97.61%
Islam	1.22%
Christianity	0.51%
Other or not stated	0.66%
Distribution of religions

According to the 2011 census Mahasamund district has a population of 1,032,754, roughly equal to the nation of Cyprus or the US state of Rhode Island. This gives it a ranking of 438rd in India (out of a total of 640). The district has a population density of 216 inhabitants per square kilometre (560/sq mi) . Its population growth rate over the decade 2001–2011 was 20%. Mahasamund has a sex ratio of 1018 females for every 1000 males, and a literacy rate of 71.54%. 11.63% of the population lives in urban areas. Scheduled Castes and Scheduled Tribes make up 13.52% and 27.10% of the population respectively.

The main tribes in the district are the Gond, Binjhwar, Savar and Kawar.

Languages of Mahasamund district (2011)
1. Chhattisgarhi (75.3%)
2. Odia (18.3%)
3. Hindi (5.03%)
4. Others (1.36%)

At the time of the 2011 Census of India, 75.27% of the population in the district spoke Chhattisgarhi, 18.34% Odia and 5.03% Hindi as their first language.

== Administration ==
Mahasamund district comprises five tehsils: they are Mahasamund city, Saraipali, Bagbahra, Pithora, Basana, which are further divided between twelve Police Stations and five outposts.

=== Politics ===
The district is part of Mahasamund Lok Sabha constituency. Its MP is Roop Kumari Choudhary from the Bharatiya Janata Party. Mahasamund has 4 assembly constituencies:

No.	Constituency	Elected MLA	Party
39	Saraipali (SC)	Chaturi Nand	Indian National Congress
40	Basna	Sampat Agrawal	Bharatiya Janata Party
41	Khallari	Dwarikadhish Yadav	Indian National Congress
42	Mahasamund	Yogeshwar Raju Sinha	Bharatiya Janata Party
