= 2024 Indian general election in Chhattisgarh =

Indian political election in Chhattisgarh

- 19, 26 April and 7 May 2024

All 11 Chhattisgarh seats in the Lok Sabha
- Opinion polls
- Turnout: 72.94% (▲1.30%)
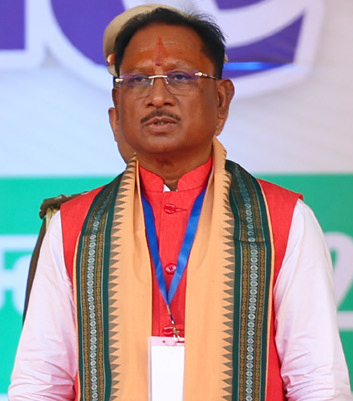

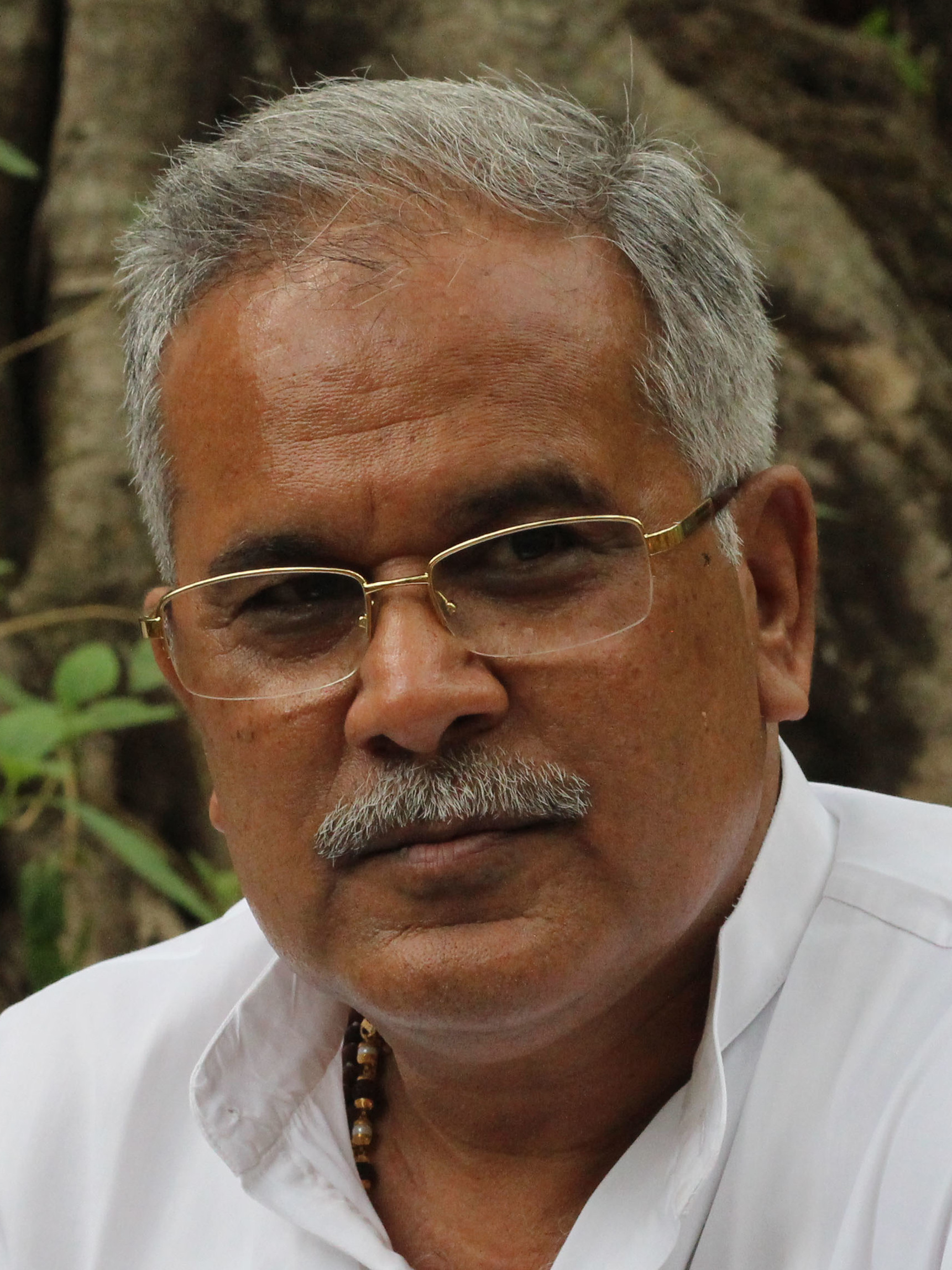
	First party	Second party
Leader	Vishnu Deo Sai	Bhupesh Baghel
Party	BJP	INC
Alliance	NDA	INDIA
Leader since	2023	2014
Leader's seat	Did not contest	Rajnandgaon (lost)
Last election	50.70%, 9 seats	41.51%, 2 seats
Seats won	10	1
Seat change	▲1	▼1
Popular vote	79,09,797	61,68,408
Percentage	52.65%	41.06%
Swing	▲1.25%	▼0.45%
- Seatwise Result Map of the 2024 general election in Chhattisgarh
Prime Minister before election
Narendra Modi
BJP
Prime Minister after election
Narendra Modi
BJP

The 2024 Indian general election was held in Chhattisgarh from 19 April to 7 May 2024 to elect 11 members of the 18th Lok Sabha.

== Election schedule ==
On 16 March 2024, the Election Commission of India announced the schedule of the 2024 Indian general election, with Chhattisgarh scheduled to vote during the first 3 phases starting from 19 April and concluding on 7 May 2024.

Phase wise schedule of 2024 Indian general election in Chhattisgarh Phase 1 Phase 2 Phase 3

Poll event	Phase		
Poll event	I	II	III
Notification date	20 March	28 March	12 April
Last date for filing nomination	27 March	4 April	19 April
Scrutiny of nomination	28 March	5 April	20 April
Last Date for withdrawal of nomination	30 March	8 April	22 April
Date of poll	19 April	26 April	7 May
Date of counting of votes/Result	4 June 2024		
No. of constituencies	1	3	7

== Parties and alliances ==
=== National Democratic Alliance ===
National Democratic Alliance

Party	Flag	Symbol	Leader	Seats contested
Bharatiya Janata Party			Vishnu Deo Sai	11

=== Indian National Developmental Inclusive Alliance ===
Indian National Developmental Inclusive Alliance

Party	Flag	Symbol	Leader	Seats contested
Indian National Congress			Bhupesh Baghel	11

=== Others ===
Party	Symbol	Seats contested
Bahujan Samaj Party		11
Gondwana Ganatantra Party		9
Bhartiya Shakti Chetna Party		9
Hamar Raj Party		8
Rashtriya Jansabha Party		7
Shakti Sena (Bharat Desh)		6
Ambedkarite Party of India		4
Sarv Adi Dal		4
Azad Samaj Party (Kanshi Ram)		3
Chhattisgarh Vikas Ganga Rashtriya Party		3
Azad Janata Party		2
Ekam Sanatan Bharat Dal		2
Loktantra Congress Party		2
Nyaydharmsabha		2
Republican Party of India (Athawale)		2
Right to Recall Party		2
Sunder Samaj Party		2
Aap Sabki Apni Party		1
Akhil Bhartiya Parivar Party		1
Asankhya Samaj Party		1
Bharat Adivasi Party		1
Bharatiya Bahujan Congress		1
Bhartiya Janta Secular Party		1
Bhrashtachar Mukti Morcha		1
Communist Party of India		1
Dhoom Sena		1
Lokshahi Ekta Party		1
Prabuddha Republican Party		1
Rashtriya Gondvana Party		1
Socialist Unity Centre of India (Communist)		1
Total		91

== Candidates ==
Constituency					
Constituency		NDA		INDIA	
1	Sarguja (ST)	BJP	Chintamani Maharaj	INC	Shashi Singh
2	Raigarh (ST)	BJP	Radheshyam Rathiya	INC	Menka Devi Singh
3	Janjgir–Champa (SC)	BJP	Kamlesh Jangde	INC	Shivkumar Dahariya
4	Korba	BJP	Saroj Pandey	INC	Jyotsna Mahant
5	Bilaspur	BJP	Tokhan Sahu	INC	Devender Singh Yadav
6	Rajnandgaon	BJP	Santosh Pandey	INC	Bhupesh Baghel
7	Durg	BJP	Vijay Baghel	INC	Rajendra Sahu
8	Raipur	BJP	Brijmohan Agrawal	INC	Vikas Upadhyay
9	Mahasamund	BJP	Rupkumari Choudhary	INC	Tamradhwaj Sahu
10	Bastar (ST)	BJP	Mahesh Kashyap	INC	Kawasi Lakhma
11	Kanker (ST)	BJP	Bhojraj Nag	INC	Biresh Thakur

== Surveys and polls ==
=== Opinion polls ===
Polling agency	Date published	Margin of error				Lead
Polling agency	Date published	Margin of error	NDA	INDIA	Others	Lead
ABP News-CVoter	April 2024	±3-5%	11	0	0	NDA
ABP News-CVoter	March 2024	±5%	11	0	0	NDA
India Today-CVoter	February 2024	±3-5%	10	1	0	NDA
ABP News-CVoter	December 2023	±3-5%	9-11	0-2	0	NDA
Times Now-ETG	December 2023	±3%	10-11	0-1	0	NDA
India TV-CNX	October 2023	±3%	7	4	0	NDA
Times Now-ETG	September 2023	±3%	7-9	2-4	0	NDA
Times Now-ETG	August 2023	±3%	6-8	3-5	0	NDA
India Today-CVoter	August 2023	±3-5%	10	1	0	NDA

Polling agency	Date published	Margin of error				Lead
Polling agency	Date published	Margin of error	NDA	INDIA	Others	Lead
ABP News-CVoter	April 2024	±3-5%	54.8%	40.8%	4.4%	14
ABP News-CVoter	March 2024	±5%	55%	41%	4%	14
India Today-CVoter	February 2024	±3-5%	54%	38%	8%	16
India Today-CVoter	August 2023	±3-5%	51%	41%	8%	10

=== Exit polls ===
Polling agency				Lead
Polling agency	NDA	INDIA	Others	Lead
TV9 Bharatvarsh- People's Insight - Polstrat	11	0	0	NDA
Actual results	10	1	0	NDA

== Voter turnout ==
=== Phase wise ===
Phase	Poll date	Constituencies	Voter turnout (%)
I	19 April 2024	Bastar (ST)	68.29%
II	26 April 2024	Rajnandgaon, Mahasamund, Kanker (ST)	76.24%
III	7 May 2024	Sarguja (ST), Raigarh (ST), Janjgir–Champa (SC), Korba, Bilaspur, Durg, Raipur	71.98%
Total			72.17%

=== Constituency wise ===
Constituency		Poll date	Turnout	Swing
1	Sarguja (ST)	7 May 2024	79.89%	2.49%▲
2	Raigarh (ST)	7 May 2024	78.85%	0.94%▲
3	Janjgir–Champa (SC)	7 May 2024	67.56%	1.75%▲
4	Korba	7 May 2024	75.63%	0.25%▲
5	Bilaspur	7 May 2024	64.77%	0.29%▲
6	Rajnandgaon	26 April 2024	77.42%	1.22%▲
7	Durg	7 May 2024	73.68%	1.90%▲
8	Raipur	7 May 2024	66.82%	0.66%▲
9	Mahasamund	26 April 2024	75.02%	0.37%▲
10	Bastar (ST)	19 April 2024	68.29%	2.03%▲
11	Kanker (ST)	26 April 2024	76.23%	1.81%▲
			72.17%	0.53%▲

== Results ==
=== Results by alliance or party ===
Alliance/ Party		Popular vote			Seats		
Alliance/ Party		Votes	%	±pp	Contested	Won	+/−
NDA	BJP	79,09,797	52.65%	▲1.25	11	10	▲1
INDIA	INC	61,68,408	41.06%	▼0.45	11	1	▼1
Others		2,10,750	1.40%	▼0.97	91	0	Steady
IND		5,99,244	3.99%	▲1.42	107	0	Steady
NOTA		1,35,430	0.90%				
Total			100%	-	220	11	-

=== Results by constituency ===
Constituency			Winner				Runner Up				Margin	%
#	Name	Poll %	Candidate	Party	Votes	%	Candidate	Party	Votes	%	Margin	%
1	Sarguja (ST)	79.97 ▲	Chintamani Maharaj	BJP	7,13,200	49.01	Shashi Singh	INC	6,48,328	44.55	64,822	4.46
2	Raigarh (ST)	78.96 ▲	Radheshyam Rathiya	BJP	8,08,275	55.63	Menka Devi Singh	INC	5,67,884	39.08	2,40,391	16.55
3	Janjgir–Champa (SC)	67.77 ▲	Kamlesh Jangre	BJP	6,78,199	48.71	Shivkumar Dahariya	INC	6,18,199	44.40	60,000	4.31
4	Korba	75.73 ▲	Jyotsna Mahant	INC	5,70,182	46.53	Saroj Pandey	BJP	5,26,899	43.00	43,283	3.53
5	Bilaspur	64.88 ▲	Tokhan Sahu	BJP	7,24,937	53.25	Devender Yadav	INC	5,60,379	41.16	1,64,558	12.09
6	Rajnandgaon	77.46 ▲	Santosh Pandey	BJP	7,12,057	49.25	Bhupesh Baghel	INC	6,67,646	46.18	44,411	3.07
7	Durg	73.78 ▲	Vijay Baghel	BJP	9,56,497	62.00	Rajendra Sahu	INC	5,18,271	33.59	4,38,226	28.41
8	Raipur	67.00 ▲	Brijmohan Agrawal	BJP	10,50,351	66.19	Vikas Upadhyay	INC	4,75,066	29.94	5,75,285	36.25
9	Mahasamund	75.21 ▲	Rupkumari Choudhary	BJP	7,03,659	53.06	Tamradhwaj Sahu	INC	5,58,203	42.09	1,45,456	10.97
10	Bastar (ST)	68.46 ▲	Mahesh Kashyap	BJP	4,58,398	45.50	Kawasi Lakhma	INC	4,03,153	40.02	55,245	5.48
11	Kanker (ST)	76.39 ▲	Bhojraj Nag	BJP	5,97,624	47.23	Biresh Thakur	INC	5,95,740	47.08	1,884	0.15

=== Assembly Segment wise leads ===
Constituency		Winner				Runner Up				Margin
#	Name	Candidate	Party	Votes	%	Candidate	Party	Votes	%	Margin
Sarguja Lok Sabha constituency
4	Premnagar	Chintamani Maharaj	BJP	92,738	48.72	Shashi Singh Koram	INC	86,659	45.52	6,079
5	Bhatgaon	Chintamani Maharaj	BJP	98,495	50.94	Shashi Singh Koram	INC	81,804	42.31	16,691
6	Pratappur	Shashi Singh Koram	INC	86,974	46.33	Chintamani Maharaj	BJP	86,263	37.99	721
7	Ramanujganj	Chintamani Maharaj	BJP	1,03,738	58.22	Shashi Singh Koram	INC	64,018	35.93	39,720
8	Samri	Shashi Singh Koram	INC	83,901	46.63	Chintamani Maharaj	BJP	82,570	45.89	1,331
9	Lundra	Chintamani Maharaj	BJP	83,339	50.64	Shashi Singh Koram	INC	71,501	43.47	11,838
10	Ambikapur	Chintamani Maharaj	BJP	94,176	48.56	Shashi Singh Koram	INC	91,254	47.06	2,922
11	Sitapur	Shashi Singh Koram	INC	81,218	50.25	Chintamani Maharaj	BJP	70,853	43.83	10,365
Raigarh Lok Sabha constituency
12	Jashpur	Radheshyam Rathiya	BJP	1,06,456	59.11	Menka Devi Singh	INC	63,335	35.16	43,121
13	Kunkuri	Radheshyam Rathiya	BJP	95,124	59.87	Menka Devi Singh	INC	55,257	33.78	39,867
14	Pathalgaon	Radheshyam Rathiya	BJP	83,425	47.06	Menka Devi Singh	INC	82,984	46.81	441
15	Lailunga	Radheshyam Rathiya	BJP	99,212	57.06	Menka Devi Singh	INC	64,717	37.22	34,495
16	Raigarh	Radheshyam Rathiya	BJP	1,30,463	65.88	Menka Devi Singh	INC	61,039	30.82	69,424
17	Sarangarh	Radheshyam Rathiya	BJP	1,02,078	51.19	Menka Devi Singh	INC	85,628	42.94	16,450
18	Kharsia	Radheshyam Rathiya	BJP	94,754	52.31	Menka Devi Singh	INC	80,111	44.23	14,643
18	Dharamjaigarh	Radheshyam Rathiya	BJP	95,146	52.53	Menka Devi Singh	INC	73,416	40.99	21,730
Janjgir-Champa Lok Sabha constituency
33	Akaltara	Kamlesh Jangde	BJP	80,623	49.80	Shivkumar Dahariya	INC	72,890	45.02	7,733
34	Janjgir-Champa	Kamlesh Jangde	BJP	89,558	55.44	Shivkumar Dahariya	INC	62,650	38.78	26,908
35	Sakti	Kamlesh Jangde	BJP	83,625	53.57	Shivkumar Dahariya	INC	65,173	41.75	18,452
36	Chandrapur	Kamlesh Jangde	BJP	77,565	37.35	Shivkumar Dahariya	INC	76,349	46.61	1,216
37	Jaijaipur	Shivkumar Dahariya	INC	80,676	49.39	Kamlesh Jangde	BJP	71,822	43.97	8,854
38	Pamgarh	Shivkumar Dahariya	INC	66,046	45.91	Kamlesh Jangde	BJP	65,569	45.57	477
43	Bilaigarh	Shivkumar Dahariya	INC	90,243	44.90	Kamlesh Jangde	BJP	87,912	43.82	2,331
44	Kasdol	Kamlesh Jangde	BJP	1,19,066	50.42	Shivkumar Dahariya	INC	1,02,114	43.24	16,952
Korba Lok Sabha constituency
1	Bharatpur-Sonhat	Jyotsna Mahant	INC	64,855	44.24	Saroj Pandey	BJP	57,689	39.36	7,166
2	Manendragarh	Jyotsna Mahant	INC	46,725	48.42	Saroj Pandey	BJP	42,193	43.72	4,532
3	Baikunthpur	Jyotsna Mahant	INC	62,447	45.57	Saroj Pandey	BJP	61,423	44.82	1,024
20	Rampur	Jyotsna Mahant	INC	87,672	50.11	Saroj Pandey	BJP	74,584	42.63	13,088
21	Korba	Saroj Pandey	BJP	1,04,152	63.20	Jyotsna Mahant	INC	53,714	32.59	50,438
22	Katghora	Jyotsna Mahant	INC	75,934	46.79	Saroj Pandey	BJP	74,287	45.77	1,647
23	Pali-Tanakhar	Jyotsna Mahant	INC	99,256	53.59	Saroj Pandey	BJP	51,178	27.63	48,078
24	Marwahi	Jyotsna Mahant	INC	78,495	50.48	Saroj Pandey	BJP	60,227	38.73	18,268
Bilaspur Lok Sabha constituency
25	Kota	Tokhan Sahu	BJP	79,454	51.10	Devendra Yadav	INC	64,168	41.27	15,286
26	Lormi	Tokhan Sahu	BJP	72,486	46.68	Devendra Yadav	INC	71,999	46.37	487
27	Mungeli	Tokhan Sahu	BJP	91,489	52.77	Devendra Yadav	INC	71,477	41.22	20,012
28	Takhatpur	Tokhan Sahu	BJP	93,767	53.65	Devendra Yadav	INC	71,902	41.14	21,865
29	Bilha	Tokhan Sahu	BJP	1,08,089	52.78	Devendra Yadav	INC	86,089	42.04	21,963
30	Bilaspur	Tokhan Sahu	BJP	96,950	66.87	Devendra Yadav	INC	44,518	30.71	52,232
31	Beltara	Tokhan Sahu	BJP	94,026	57.20	Devendra Yadav	INC	63,224	38.46	30,802
32	Masturi	Tokhan Sahu	BJP	86,933	47.15	Devendra Yadav	INC	85,528	46.30	1,405
Rajnandgaon Lok Sabha constituency
71	Pandariya	Bhupesh Baghel	INC	1,10,317	48.08	Santosh Pandey	BJP	1,06,908	46.60	3,409
72	Kawardha	Santosh Pandey	BJP	1,25,803	49.56	Bhupesh Baghel	INC	1,15,398	45.46	10,405
73	Khairagarh	Santosh Pandey	BJP	85,716	49.56	Bhupesh Baghel	INC	79,757	46.11	5,959
74	Dongargarh	Santosh Pandey	BJP	85,961	51.26	Bhupesh Baghel	INC	75,003	44.80	10,958
75	Rajnandgaon	Santosh Pandey	BJP	1,08,657	66.06	Bhupesh Baghel	INC	50,991	31.00	57,666
76	Dongargaon	Santosh Pandey	BJP	89,119	53.20	Bhupesh Baghel	INC	72,082	43.03	17,037
77	Khujji	Bhupesh Baghel	INC	82,394	52.46	Santosh Pandey	BJP	67,475	42.96	14,919
78	Mohla-Manpur	Bhupesh Baghel	INC	81,140	61.80	Santosh Pandey	BJP	41,800	31.84	39,340
Durg Lok Sabha constituency
62	Patan	Vijay Baghel	BJP	97,067	54.74	Rajendra Sahu	INC	72,424	40.81	24,643
63	Durg Gramin	Vijay Baghel	BJP	1,01,538	61.19	Rajendra Sahu	INC	58,185	35.06	43,353
64	Durg City	Vijay Baghel	BJP	1,13,376	71.13	Rajendra Sahu	INC	41,070	25.76	72,306
65	Bhilai Nagar	Vijay Baghel	BJP	68,760	65.29	Rajendra Sahu	INC	33,463	31.77	35,297
66	Vaishali Nagar	Vijay Baghel	BJP	1,19,095	70.12	Rajendra Sahu	INC	45,082	26.54	74,013
66	Ahiwara	Vijay Baghel	BJP	1,16,316	65.96	Rajendra Sahu	INC	53,832	30.53	62,484
68	Saja	Vijay Baghel	BJP	1,11,215	56.32	Rajendra Sahu	INC	74,750	37.89	36,465
69	Bemetara	Vijay Baghel	BJP	1,15,077	59.93	Rajendra Sahu	INC	66,339	34.55	48,738
70	Navagarh	Vijay Baghel	BJP	1,11,912	57.26	Rajendra Sahu	INC	71,412	36.54	40,500
Raipur Lok Sabha constituency
45	Baloda Bazar	Brijmohan Agrawal	BJP	1,30,157	61.79	Vikas Upadhyay	INC	70,379	33.41	59,778
46	Bhatapara	Brijmohan Agrawal	BJP	95,696	53.22	Vikas Upadhyay	INC	74,296	41.32	21,400
47	Dharsiwa	Brijmohan Agrawal	BJP	1,22,829	67.59	Vikas Upadhyay	INC	51,227	28.18	71,602
48	Raipur City Gramin	Brijmohan Agrawal	BJP	1,57,828	73.57	Vikas Upadhyay	INC	50,219	23.44	1,07,609
49	Raipur City West	Brijmohan Agrawal	BJP	1,25,250	74.70	Vikas Upadhyay	INC	37,879	22.59	87,371
50	Raipur City North	Brijmohan Agrawal	BJP	82,812	70.87	Vikas Upadhyay	INC	31,086	26.60	51,726
51	Raipur City South	Brijmohan Agrawal	BJP	1,24,884	75.90	Vikas Upadhyay	INC	35,731	21.71	89,153
51	Arang	Brijmohan Agrawal	BJP	1,02,635	59.69	Vikas Upadhyay	INC	61,059	35.51	41,576
53	Abhanpur	Brijmohan Agrawal	BJP	1,05,356	60.33	Vikas Upadhyay	INC	61,780	35.37	43,576
Mahasamund Lok Sabha constituency
39	Saraipali	Rupkumari Choudhary	BJP	78,324	50.08	Tamradhwaj Sahu	INC	69,989	44.75	7,335
40	Basna	Rupkumari Choudhary	BJP	81,990	48.27	Tamradhwaj Sahu	INC	80,102	47.15	1,888
41	Khallari	Rupkumari Choudhary	BJP	73,471	47.74	Tamradhwaj Sahu	INC	72,865	47.34	606
42	Mahasamund	Rupkumari Choudhary	BJP	81,662	55.35	Tamradhwaj Sahu	INC	59,907	40.60	21,755
54	Rajim	Rupkumari Choudhary	BJP	94,614	54.16	Tamradhwaj Sahu	INC	72,470	41.84	22,144
55	Bindrawagarh	Rupkumari Choudhary	BJP	1,00,100	53.83	Tamradhwaj Sahu	INC	72,236	38.84	27,864
57	Kurud	Rupkumari Choudhary	BJP	91,000	55.52	Tamradhwaj Sahu	INC	66,071	40.31	25,929
58	Dhamtari	Rupkumari Choudhary	BJP	1,00,130	59.25	Tamradhwaj Sahu	INC	63,124	37.35	37,006
Bastar Lok Sabha constituency
83	Kondagaon	Mahesh Kashyap	BJP	66,661	47.86	Kawasi Lakhma	INC	62,567	44.92	4,094
84	Narayanpur	Mahesh Kashyap	BJP	59,237	44.81	Kawasi Lakhma	INC	54,829	41.48	4,408
85	Bastar	Kawasi Lakhma	INC	69,490	49.41	Mahesh Kashyap	BJP	60,841	43.26	8,649
86	Jagdalpur	Mahesh Kashyap	BJP	92,345	58.38	Kawasi Lakhma	INC	55,399	35.02	36,946
87	Chitrakot	Mahesh Kashyap	BJP	59,675	43.58	Kawasi Lakhma	INC	52,524	38.35	7,151
88	Dantewada	Mahesh Kashyap	BJP	55,071	46.87	Kawasi Lakhma	INC	42,157	35.90	12,914
89	Bijapur	Kawasi Lakhma	INC	34,182	46.08	Mahesh Kashyap	BJP	27,855	37.55	6,327
90	Konta	Mahesh Kashyap	BJP	34,918	37.35	Kawasi Lakhma	INC	31,120	33.29	3,798
Kanker Lok Sabha constituency
56	Sihawa	Bhojraj Nag	BJP	76,198	49.47	Biresh Thakur	INC	70,770	45.95	5,428
59	Sanjari Balod	Bhojraj Nag	BJP	92,579	54.06	Biresh Thakur	INC	72,666	42.43	19,913
60	Dondi Lohara	Biresh Thakur	INC	88,064	53.51	Bhojraj Nag	BJP	68,787	41.79	19,277
61	Gunderdehi	Bhojraj Nag	BJP	95,136	52.27	Biresh Thakur	INC	79,966	43.94	15,170
79	Antagarh	Bhojraj Nag	BJP	71,784	54.03	Biresh Thakur	INC	50,331	37.88	21,453
80	Bhanupratappur	Biresh Thakur	INC	84,377	54.64	Bhojraj Nag	BJP	60,836	39.39	23,541
81	Kanker	Biresh Thakur	INC	70,658	50.43	Bhojraj Nag	BJP	61,185	43.67	9,473
82	Keshkal	Biresh Thakur	INC	76,436	49.29	Bhojraj Nag	BJP	68,680	44.28	7,756

== Assembly segments wise lead of Parties ==
2024 Chhattisgarh Lok Sabha Elections Assembly Wise Map

Party	Assembly segments	Position in Assembly (as of 2023 election)
Bharatiya Janata Party	68	54
Indian National Congress	22	35
Gondwana Ganatantra Party	0	1
Total	90	

== See also ==
- 2024 Indian general election in Dadra and Nagar Haveli and Daman and Diu
- 2024 Indian general election in Delhi
- 2024 Indian general election in Goa
