= List of members of the 18th Lok Sabha =

Members of Lok Sabha (2024-)

This is a list of members of the 18th Lok Sabha arranged by the states and union territories they are elected from. These MPs were elected in the 2024 Indian general election held in April–June 2024.

== Andaman and Nicobar Islands ==

Keys:

NDA (1)
- BJP (1)

No.	Constituency	Name	Party	Alliance
1	Andaman and Nicobar Islands	Bishnu Pada Ray	Bharatiya Janata Party	NDA

== Andhra Pradesh ==

Keys:

NDA (21)
- TDP (16)
- BJP (3)
- JSP (2)
Others
YSRCP (4)

No.	Constituency	Name	Party	Alliance
1	Araku (ST)	Gumma Thanuja Rani	YSR Congress Party	None
2	Srikakulam	Kinjarapu Ram Mohan Naidu	Telugu Desam Party	NDA
3	Vizianagaram	Appalanaidu Kalisetti	Telugu Desam Party	NDA
4	Visakhapatnam	Mathukumilli Bharat	Telugu Desam Party	NDA
5	Anakapalli	C. M. Ramesh	Bharatiya Janata Party	NDA
6	Kakinada	Tangella Uday Srinivas	Janasena Party	NDA
7	Amalapuram (SC)	Ganti Harish Madhur	Telugu Desam Party	NDA
8	Rajahmundry	Daggubati Purandeswari	Bharatiya Janata Party	NDA
9	Narasapuram	Bhupathi Raju Srinivasa Varma	Bharatiya Janata Party	NDA
10	Eluru	Putta Mahesh Kumar	Telugu Desam Party	NDA
11	Machilipatnam	Vallabhaneni Balashowry	Janasena Party	NDA
12	Vijayawada	Kesineni Sivanath	Telugu Desam Party	NDA
13	Guntur	Chandra Sekhar Pemmasani	Telugu Desam Party	NDA
14	Narasaraopet	Lavu Sri Krishna Devarayalu	Telugu Desam Party	NDA
15	Bapatla (SC)	Krishna Prasad Tenneti	Telugu Desam Party	NDA
16	Ongole	Magunta Sreenivasulu Reddy	Telugu Desam Party	NDA
17	Nandyal	Byreddy Shabari	Telugu Desam Party	NDA
18	Kurnool	B. Nagaraju Panchalingala	Telugu Desam Party	NDA
19	Anantapur	G. Lakshminarayana	Telugu Desam Party	NDA
20	Hindupur	B. K. Parthasarathi	Telugu Desam Party	NDA
21	Kadapa	Y. S. Avinash Reddy	YSR Congress Party	None
22	Nellore	Vemireddy Prabhakar Reddy	Telugu Desam Party	NDA
23	Tirupati (SC)	Maddila Gurumoorthy	YSR Congress Party	None
24	Rajampet	P. V. Midhun Reddy	YSR Congress Party	None
25	Chittoor (SC)	Daggumalla Prasada Rao	Telugu Desam Party	NDA

== Arunachal Pradesh ==

Keys:

NDA (2)
- BJP (2)

#	Constituency	Name	Party	Alliance
1	Arunachal West	Kiren Rijiju	Bharatiya Janata Party	NDA
2	Arunachal East	Tapir Gao	Bharatiya Janata Party	NDA

== Assam ==
As of 2026

2024 Election Result

Keys:

NDA (11)
- BJP (10)
- AGP (1)
INDIA (2)
- INC (2)
Other (1)
- UPPL (1)

No.	Constituency	Name	Party	Alliance
1	Kokrajhar (ST)	Joyanta Basumatary	United People's Party Liberal	None
2	Dhubri	Rakibul Hussain	Indian National Congress	INDIA
3	Barpeta	Phani Bhusan Choudhury	Asom Gana Parishad	NDA
4	Darrang–Udalguri	Dilip Saikia	Bharatiya Janata Party	NDA
5	Guwahati	Bijuli Kalita Medhi	Bharatiya Janata Party	NDA
6	Diphu (ST)	Amarsing Tisso	Bharatiya Janata Party	NDA
7	Karimganj	Kripanath Mallah	Bharatiya Janata Party	NDA
8	Silchar (SC)	Parimal Suklabaidya	Bharatiya Janata Party	NDA
9	Nagaon	Pradyut Bordoloi (Resigned on 24 March 2026)	Indian National Congress	INDIA
9	Nagaon	Devasish Sharma (Elected on 9th October 2026)	Bharatiya Janata Party	NDA
10	Kaziranga	Kamakhya Prasad Tasa	Bharatiya Janata Party	NDA
11	Sonitpur	Ranjit Dutta	Bharatiya Janata Party	NDA
12	Lakhimpur	Pradan Baruah	Bharatiya Janata Party	NDA
13	Dibrugarh	Sarbananda Sonowal	Bharatiya Janata Party	NDA
14	Jorhat	Gaurav Gogoi	Indian National Congress	INDIA

== Bihar ==

Keys:

NDA (30)
- BJP (12)
- JD(U) (12)
- LJP(RV) (5)
- HAM(S) (1)
INDIA (10)
- RJD (4)
- INC (3)
- CPI(ML)L (2)
- Independent (1)

No.	Constituency	Name	Party	Alliance
1	Valmiki Nagar	Sunil Kushwaha	Janata Dal (United)	NDA
2	Paschim Champaran	Sanjay Jaiswal	Bharatiya Janata Party	NDA
3	Purvi Champaran	Radha Mohan Singh	Bharatiya Janata Party	NDA
4	Sheohar	Lovely Anand	Janata Dal (United)	NDA
5	Sitamarhi	Devesh Chandra Thakur	Janata Dal (United)	NDA
6	Madhubani	Ashok Kumar Yadav	Bharatiya Janata Party	NDA
7	Jhanjharpur	Ramprit Mandal	Janata Dal (United)	NDA
8	Supaul	Dileshwar Kamait	Janata Dal (United)	NDA
9	Araria	Pradeep Kumar Singh	Bharatiya Janata Party	NDA
10	Kishanganj	Mohammad Jawed	Indian National Congress	INDIA
11	Katihar	Tariq Anwar	Indian National Congress	INDIA
12	Purnia	Pappu Yadav	Independent	INDIA
13	Madhepura	Dinesh Chandra Yadav	Janata Dal (United)	NDA
14	Darbhanga	Gopal Jee Thakur	Bharatiya Janata Party	NDA
15	Muzaffarpur	Raj Bhushan Choudhary	Bharatiya Janata Party	NDA
16	Vaishali	Veena Devi	Lok Janshakti Party (Ram Vilas)	NDA
17	Gopalganj (SC)	Alok Kumar Suman	Janata Dal (United)	NDA
18	Siwan	Vijay Lakshmi Kushwaha	Janata Dal (United)	NDA
19	Maharajganj	Janardan Singh Sigriwal	Bharatiya Janata Party	NDA
20	Saran	Rajiv Pratap Rudy	Bharatiya Janata Party	NDA
21	Hajipur (SC)	Chirag Paswan	Lok Janshakti Party (Ram Vilas)	NDA
22	Ujiarpur	Nityanand Rai	Bharatiya Janata Party	NDA
23	Samastipur (SC)	Shambhavi Choudhary	Lok Janshakti Party (Ram Vilas)	NDA
24	Begusarai	Giriraj Singh	Bharatiya Janata Party	NDA
25	Khagaria	Rajesh Verma	Lok Janshakti Party (Ram Vilas)	NDA
26	Bhagalpur	Ajay Kumar Mandal	Janata Dal (United)	NDA
27	Banka	Giridhari Yadav	Janata Dal (United)	NDA
28	Munger	Rajiv Ranjan Singh	Janata Dal (United)	NDA
29	Nalanda	Kaushalendra Kumar	Janata Dal (United)	NDA
30	Patna Sahib	Ravi Shankar Prasad	Bharatiya Janata Party	NDA
31	Pataliputra	Misa Bharti	Rashtriya Janata Dal	INDIA
32	Arrah	Sudama Prasad	Communist Party of India (Marxist-Leninist) Liberation	INDIA
33	Buxar	Sudhakar Singh	Rashtriya Janata Dal	INDIA
34	Sasaram (SC)	Manoj Kumar	Indian National Congress	INDIA
35	Karakat	Raja Ram Kushwaha	Communist Party of India (Marxist-Leninist) Liberation	INDIA
36	Jahanabad	Surendra Prasad Yadav	Rashtriya Janata Dal	INDIA
37	Aurangabad	Abhay Kushwaha	Rashtriya Janata Dal	INDIA
38	Gaya (SC)	Jitan Ram Manjhi	Hindustani Awam Morcha	NDA
39	Nawada	Vivek Thakur	Bharatiya Janata Party	NDA
40	Jamui (SC)	Arun Bharti	Lok Janshakti Party (Ram Vilas)	NDA

== Chandigarh ==

Keys:

INDIA (1)
- INC (1)

No.	Constituency	Name	Party	Alliance
1	Chandigarh	Manish Tewari	Indian National Congress	INDIA

== Chhattisgarh ==

Keys:

NDA (10)
- BJP (10)
INDIA (1)
- INC (1)

No.	Constituency	Name	Party	Alliance
1	Sarguja (ST)	Chintamani Maharaj	Bharatiya Janata Party	NDA
2	Raigarh (ST)	Radheshyam Rathiya	Bharatiya Janata Party	NDA
3	Janjgir–Champa (SC)	Kamlesh Jangde	Bharatiya Janata Party	NDA
4	Korba	Jyotsna Mahant	Indian National Congress	INDIA
5	Bilaspur	Tokhan Sahu	Bharatiya Janata Party	NDA
6	Rajnandgaon	Santosh Pandey	Bharatiya Janata Party	NDA
7	Durg	Vijay Baghel	Bharatiya Janata Party	NDA
8	Raipur	Brijmohan Agrawal	Bharatiya Janata Party	NDA
9	Mahasamund	Rupkumari Choudhary	Bharatiya Janata Party	NDA
10	Bastar (ST)	Mahesh Kashyap	Bharatiya Janata Party	NDA
11	Kanker (ST)	Bhojraj Nag	Bharatiya Janata Party	NDA

== Dadra and Nagar Haveli and Daman and Diu ==
Dadra and Nagar Haveli Lok Sabha constituency

Daman and Diu Lok Sabha constituency

Keys:

NDA (1)
- BJP (1)
Other (1)
- Independent (1)

No.	Constituency	Name	Party	Alliance
1	Dadra and Nagar Haveli (ST)	Kalaben Delkar	Bharatiya Janata Party	NDA
2	Daman and Diu	Umeshbhai Patel	Independent	None

== Delhi ==

Keys:

NDA (7)
- BJP (7)

No.	Constituency	Name	Party	Alliance
1	Chandni Chowk	Praveen Khandelwal	Bharatiya Janata Party	NDA
2	North East Delhi	Manoj Tiwari	Bharatiya Janata Party	NDA
3	East Delhi	Harsh Malhotra	Bharatiya Janata Party	NDA
4	New Delhi	Bansuri Swaraj	Bharatiya Janata Party	NDA
5	North West Delhi (SC)	Yogender Chandoliya	Bharatiya Janata Party	NDA
6	West Delhi	Kamaljeet Sehrawat	Bharatiya Janata Party	NDA
7	South Delhi	Ramvir Singh Bidhuri	Bharatiya Janata Party	NDA

== Goa ==

Keys:

NDA (1)
- BJP (1)
INDIA (1)
- INC (1)

No.	Constituency	Name	Party	Alliance
1	North Goa	Shripad Naik	Bharatiya Janata Party	NDA
2	South Goa	Viriato Fernandes	Indian National Congress	INDIA

== Gujarat ==

Keys:

NDA (25)
- BJP (25)
INDIA (1)
- INC (1)

No.	Constituency	Name	Party	Alliance
1	Kachchh (SC)	Vinodbhai Chavda	Bharatiya Janata Party	NDA
2	Banaskantha	Geniben Thakor	Indian National Congress	INDIA
3	Patan	Bharatsinhji Dabhi	Bharatiya Janata Party	NDA
4	Mahesana	Haribhai Patel	Bharatiya Janata Party	NDA
5	Sabarkantha	Shobhanaben Baraiya	Bharatiya Janata Party	NDA
6	Gandhinagar	Amit Shah	Bharatiya Janata Party	NDA
7	Ahmedabad East	Hasmukh Patel	Bharatiya Janata Party	NDA
8	Ahmedabad West (SC)	Dineshbhai Makwana	Bharatiya Janata Party	NDA
9	Surendranagar	Chandubhai Shihora	Bharatiya Janata Party	NDA
10	Rajkot	Parshottam Rupala	Bharatiya Janata Party	NDA
11	Porbandar	Mansukh Mandaviya	Bharatiya Janata Party	NDA
12	Jamnagar	Poonamben Maadam	Bharatiya Janata Party	NDA
13	Junagadh	Rajesh Chudasama	Bharatiya Janata Party	NDA
14	Amreli	Bharatbhai Sutariya	Bharatiya Janata Party	NDA
15	Bhavnagar	Nimuben Bambhaniya	Bharatiya Janata Party	NDA
16	Anand	Mitesh Patel	Bharatiya Janata Party	NDA
17	Kheda	Devusinh Chauhan	Bharatiya Janata Party	NDA
18	Panchmahal	Rajpalsinh Jadav	Bharatiya Janata Party	NDA
19	Dahod (ST)	Jasvantsinh Bhabhor	Bharatiya Janata Party	NDA
20	Vadodara	Hemang Joshi	Bharatiya Janata Party	NDA
21	Chhota Udaipur (ST)	Jashubhai Rathva	Bharatiya Janata Party	NDA
22	Bharuch	Mansukhbhai Vasava	Bharatiya Janata Party	NDA
23	Bardoli (ST)	Parbhubhai Vasava	Bharatiya Janata Party	NDA
24	Surat	Mukesh Dalal	Bharatiya Janata Party	NDA
25	Navsari	C. R. Patil	Bharatiya Janata Party	NDA
26	Valsad (ST)	Dhavalbhai Patel	Bharatiya Janata Party	NDA

== Haryana ==

Keys:

NDA (5)
- BJP (5)
INDIA (5)
- INC (5)

No.	Constituency	Name	Party	Alliance
1	Ambala (SC)	Varun Chaudhary	Indian National Congress	INDIA
2	Kurukshetra	Naveen Jindal	Bharatiya Janata Party	NDA
3	Sirsa (SC)	Selja Kumari	Indian National Congress	INDIA
4	Hisar	Jai Parkash	Indian National Congress	INDIA
5	Karnal	Manohar Lal Khattar	Bharatiya Janata Party	NDA
6	Sonipat	Satpal Brahamchari	Indian National Congress	INDIA
7	Rohtak	Deepender Singh Hooda	Indian National Congress	INDIA
8	Bhiwani–Mahendragarh	Dharambir Singh Chaudhary	Bharatiya Janata Party	NDA
9	Gurgaon	Rao Inderjit Singh	Bharatiya Janata Party	NDA
10	Faridabad	Krishan Pal Gurjar	Bharatiya Janata Party	NDA

== Himachal Pradesh ==

Keys:

NDA (4)
- BJP (4)

No.	Constituency	Name	Party	Alliance
1	Mandi	Kangana Ranaut	Bharatiya Janata Party	NDA
2	Kangra	Rajeev Bhardwaj	Bharatiya Janata Party	NDA
3	Hamirpur	Anurag Thakur	Bharatiya Janata Party	NDA
4	Shimla (SC)	Suresh Kumar Kashyap	Bharatiya Janata Party	NDA

== Jammu and Kashmir ==
As of 2026

2024 Result

Keys:

NDA (2)
- BJP (2)
INDIA (1)
- JKNC (1)
Other (1)
- JKAIP (1)

#	Constituency	Name	Party	Alliance
1	Baramulla	Sheikh Abdul Rashid	Jammu and Kashmir Awami Ittehad Party (Note: Sheikh Abdul Rashid formed the Jammu and Kashmir Awami Ittehad Party.)	None
2	Srinagar	Aga Syed Ruhullah Mehdi	Jammu & Kashmir National Conference	INDIA
2	Srinagar	Vacant	None	
3	Anantnag–Rajouri	Mian Altaf Ahmed Larvi	Jammu & Kashmir National Conference	INDIA
4	Udhampur	Jitendra Singh	Bharatiya Janata Party	NDA
5	Jammu	Jugal Kishore Sharma	Bharatiya Janata Party	NDA

== Jharkhand ==

Keys:

NDA (9)
- BJP (8)
- AJSU (1)
INDIA (5)
- JMM (3)
- INC (2)

No.	Constituency	Name	Party	Alliance
1	Rajmahal (ST)	Vijay Hansda	Jharkhand Mukti Morcha	INDIA
2	Dumka (ST)	Nalin Soren	Jharkhand Mukti Morcha	INDIA
3	Godda	Nishikant Dubey	Bharatiya Janata Party	NDA
4	Chatra	Kalicharan Singh	Bharatiya Janata Party	NDA
5	Koderma	Annpurna Devi	Bharatiya Janata Party	NDA
6	Giridih	Chandra Prakash Choudhary	All Jharkhand Students Union	NDA
7	Dhanbad	Dulu Mahato	Bharatiya Janata Party	NDA
8	Ranchi	Sanjay Seth	Bharatiya Janata Party	NDA
9	Jamshedpur	Bidyut Baran Mahato	Bharatiya Janata Party	NDA
10	Singhbhum (ST)	Joba Majhi	Jharkhand Mukti Morcha	INDIA
11	Khunti (ST)	Kali Charan Munda	Indian National Congress	INDIA
12	Lohardaga (ST)	Sukhdeo Bhagat	Indian National Congress	INDIA
13	Palamu (SC)	Vishnu Dayal Ram	Bharatiya Janata Party	NDA
14	Hazaribagh	Manish Jaiswal	Bharatiya Janata Party	NDA

== Karnataka ==

Keys:

NDA (19)
- BJP (17)
- JD(S) (2)
INDIA (9)
- INC (9)

No.	Constituency	Name	Party	Alliance
1	Chikkodi	Priyanka Jarkiholi	Indian National Congress	INDIA
2	Belgaum	Jagadish Shettar	Bharatiya Janata Party	NDA
3	Bagalkot	P. C. Gaddigoudar	Bharatiya Janata Party	NDA
4	Bijapur (SC)	Ramesh Jigajinagi	Bharatiya Janata Party	NDA
5	Gulbarga (SC)	Radhakrishna	Indian National Congress	INDIA
6	Raichur (ST)	G Kumar Naik	Indian National Congress	INDIA
7	Bidar	Sagar Khandre	Indian National Congress	INDIA
8	Koppal	K. Rajashekar Basavaraj Hitnal	Indian National Congress	INDIA
9	Bellary (ST)	E. Tukaram	Indian National Congress	INDIA
10	Haveri	Basavaraj Bommai	Bharatiya Janata Party	NDA
11	Dharwad	Pralhad Joshi	Bharatiya Janata Party	NDA
12	Uttara Kannada	Vishweshwar Hegde Kageri	Bharatiya Janata Party	NDA
13	Davanagere	Prabha Mallikarjun	Indian National Congress	INDIA
14	Shimoga	B. Y. Raghavendra	Bharatiya Janata Party	NDA
15	Udupi Chikmagalur	Kota Srinivas Poojary	Bharatiya Janata Party	NDA
16	Hassan	Shreyas M. Patel	Indian National Congress	INDIA
17	Dakshina Kannada	Brijesh Chowta	Bharatiya Janata Party	NDA
18	Chitradurga (SC)	Govind Karjol	Bharatiya Janata Party	NDA
19	Tumkur	V. Somanna	Bharatiya Janata Party	NDA
20	Mandya	H. D. Kumaraswamy	Janata Dal (Secular)	NDA
21	Mysore	Yaduveer Wadiyar	Bharatiya Janata Party	NDA
22	Chamarajanagar (SC)	Sunil Bose	Indian National Congress	INDIA
23	Bangalore Rural	C. N. Manjunath	Bharatiya Janata Party	NDA
24	Bangalore North	Shobha Karandlaje	Bharatiya Janata Party	NDA
25	Bangalore Central	P. C. Mohan	Bharatiya Janata Party	NDA
26	Bangalore South	Tejasvi Surya	Bharatiya Janata Party	NDA
27	Chikballapur	K. Sudhakar	Bharatiya Janata Party	NDA
28	Kolar (SC)	M. Mallesh Babu	Janata Dal (Secular)	NDA

== Kerala ==

Keys:

INDIA (19)

UDF (18)

- INC (14)
- IUML (2)
- RSP (1)
- KEC (1)

LDF (1)

- CPI(M) (1)

NDA (1)
- BJP (1)

No.	Constituency	Name	Party	Alliance
1	Kasaragod	Rajmohan Unnithan	Indian National Congress	INDIA
2	Kannur	K. Sudhakaran	Indian National Congress	INDIA
3	Vatakara	Shafi Parambil	Indian National Congress	INDIA
4	Wayanad	Rahul Gandhi (Resigned on 17 June 2024)	Indian National Congress	INDIA
4	Wayanad	Priyanka Gandhi (Elected on 23 November 2024)	Indian National Congress	INDIA
5	Kozhikode	M. K. Raghavan	Indian National Congress	INDIA
6	Malappuram	E. T. Muhammed Basheer	Indian Union Muslim League	INDIA
7	Ponnani	M. P. Abdussamad Samadani	Indian Union Muslim League	INDIA
8	Palakkad	V. K. Sreekandan	Indian National Congress	INDIA
9	Alathur (SC)	K. Radhakrishnan	Communist Party of India (Marxist)	INDIA
10	Thrissur	Suresh Gopi	Bharatiya Janata Party	NDA
11	Chalakudy	Benny Behanan	Indian National Congress	INDIA
12	Ernakulam	Hibi Eden	Indian National Congress	INDIA
13	Idukki	Dean Kuriakose	Indian National Congress	INDIA
14	Kottayam	Francis George	Kerala Congress	INDIA
15	Alappuzha	K. C. Venugopal	Indian National Congress	INDIA
16	Mavelikara (SC)	Kodikkunnil Suresh	Indian National Congress	INDIA
17	Pathanamthitta	Anto Antony	Indian National Congress	INDIA
18	Kollam	N. K. Premachandran	Revolutionary Socialist Party	INDIA
19	Attingal	Adoor Prakash	Indian National Congress	INDIA
20	Thiruvananthapuram	Shashi Tharoor	Indian National Congress	INDIA

== Ladakh ==

Keys:

INDIA (1)
- Independent (1)

No.	Constituency	Name	Party	Alliance
1	Ladakh	Mohmad Haneefa	Independent	INDIA

== Lakshadweep ==
Keys:

INDIA (1)
- INC (1)

No.	Constituency	Name	Party	Alliance
1	Lakshadweep (ST)	Muhammed Hamdulla Sayeed	Indian National Congress	INDIA

== Madhya Pradesh ==

Keys:

NDA (29)
- BJP (29)

No.	Constituency	Name	Party	Alliance
1	Morena	Shivmangal Singh Tomar	Bharatiya Janata Party	NDA
2	Bhind (SC)	Sandhya Ray	Bharatiya Janata Party	NDA
3	Gwalior	Bharat Singh Kushwah	Bharatiya Janata Party	NDA
4	Guna	Jyotiraditya Scindia	Bharatiya Janata Party	NDA
5	Sagar	Lata Wankhede	Bharatiya Janata Party	NDA
6	Tikamgarh (SC)	Virendra Kumar Khatik	Bharatiya Janata Party	NDA
7	Damoh	Rahul Lodhi	Bharatiya Janata Party	NDA
8	Khajuraho	V. D. Sharma	Bharatiya Janata Party	NDA
9	Satna	Ganesh Singh	Bharatiya Janata Party	NDA
10	Rewa	Janardan Mishra	Bharatiya Janata Party	NDA
11	Sidhi	Rajesh Mishra	Bharatiya Janata Party	NDA
12	Shahdol (ST)	Himadri Singh	Bharatiya Janata Party	NDA
13	Jabalpur	Ashish Dubey	Bharatiya Janata Party	NDA
14	Mandla (ST)	Faggan Singh Kulaste	Bharatiya Janata Party	NDA
15	Balaghat	Bharti Pardhi	Bharatiya Janata Party	NDA
16	Chhindwara	Vivek Kumar Sahu	Bharatiya Janata Party	NDA
17	Hoshangabad	Darshan Singh Choudhary	Bharatiya Janata Party	NDA
18	Vidisha	Shivraj Singh Chauhan	Bharatiya Janata Party	NDA
19	Bhopal	Alok Sharma	Bharatiya Janata Party	NDA
20	Rajgarh	Rodmal Nagar	Bharatiya Janata Party	NDA
21	Dewas (SC)	Mahendra Solanki	Bharatiya Janata Party	NDA
22	Ujjain (SC)	Anil Firojiya	Bharatiya Janata Party	NDA
23	Mandsaur	Sudhir Gupta	Bharatiya Janata Party	NDA
24	Ratlam (ST)	Anita Nagar Singh Chouhan	Bharatiya Janata Party	NDA
25	Dhar (ST)	Savitri Thakur	Bharatiya Janata Party	NDA
26	Indore	Shankar Lalwani	Bharatiya Janata Party	NDA
27	Khargone (ST)	Gajendra Patel	Bharatiya Janata Party	NDA
28	Khandwa	Gyaneswar Patil	Bharatiya Janata Party	NDA
29	Betul (ST)	Durga Das Uikey	Bharatiya Janata Party	NDA

== Maharashtra ==
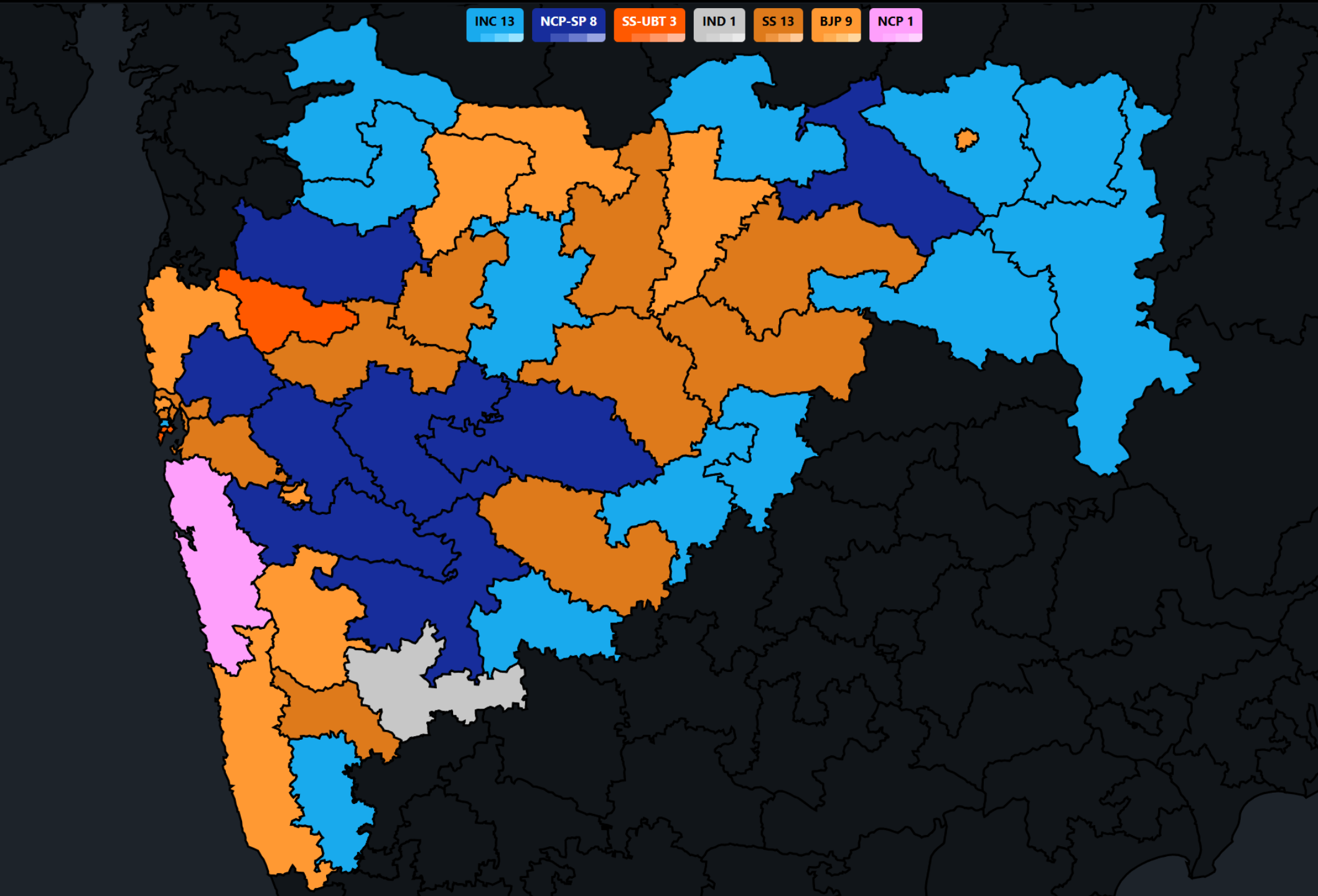

Keys:

INDIA (25)
- INC (13)
- NCP-SP (8)
- SS(UBT) (3)
- Independent (1)
NDA (23)
- SHS (13)
- BJP (9)
- NCP (1)

No.	Constituency	Name	Party	Alliance
1	Nandurbar (ST)	Gowaal Kagada Padavi	Indian National Congress	INDIA
2	Dhule	Bachhav Shobha Dinesh	Indian National Congress	INDIA
3	Jalgaon	Smita Wagh	Bharatiya Janata Party	NDA
4	Raver	Raksha Khadse	Bharatiya Janata Party	NDA
5	Buldhana	Prataprao Jadhav	Shiv Sena	NDA
6	Akola	Anup Dhotre	Bharatiya Janata Party	NDA
7	Amravati (SC)	Balwant Wankhade	Indian National Congress	INDIA
8	Wardha	Amar Kale	Nationalist Congress Party (Sharadchandra Pawar)	INDIA
9	Ramtek (SC)	Shyamkumar (Bablu) Barve	Indian National Congress	INDIA
10	Nagpur	Nitin Gadkari	Bharatiya Janata Party	NDA
11	Bhandara–Gondiya	Prashant Padole	Indian National Congress	INDIA
12	Gadchiroli–Chimur (ST)	Namdeo Kirsan	Indian National Congress	INDIA
13	Chandrapur	Pratibha Dhanorkar	Indian National Congress	INDIA
14	Yavatmal–Washim	Sanjay Deshmukh (Note: Switched from Shiv Sena (UBT) to Shiv Sena on 22 June 2026.)	Shiv Sena	NDA
15	Hingoli	Nagesh Aashtikar Patil	Shiv Sena	NDA
16	Nanded	Vasantrao Balwantrao Chavan (Died on 26 August 2024)	Indian National Congress	INDIA
16	Nanded	Ravindra Vasantrao Chavan (Elected on 23 November 2024)	Indian National Congress	INDIA
17	Parbhani	Sanjay Jadhav	Shiv Sena	NDA
18	Jalna	Kalyan Kale	Indian National Congress	INDIA
19	Aurangabad	Sandipanrao Bhumre	Shiv Sena	NDA
20	Dindori (ST)	Bhaskar Bhagare	Nationalist Congress Party (Sharadchandra Pawar)	INDIA
21	Nashik	Rajabhau Waje	Shiv Sena (UBT)	INDIA
22	Palghar (ST)	Hemant Savara	Bharatiya Janata Party	NDA
23	Bhiwandi	Suresh Mhatre	Nationalist Congress Party (Sharadchandra Pawar)	INDIA
24	Kalyan	Shrikant Shinde	Shiv Sena	NDA
25	Thane	Naresh Mhaske	Shiv Sena	NDA
26	Mumbai North	Piyush Goyal	Bharatiya Janata Party	NDA
27	Mumbai North West	Ravindra Waikar	Shiv Sena	NDA
28	Mumbai North East	Sanjay Dina Patil	Shiv Sena	NDA
29	Mumbai North Central	Varsha Gaikwad	Indian National Congress	INDIA
30	Mumbai South Central	Anil Desai	Shiv Sena (UBT)	INDIA
31	Mumbai South	Arvind Sawant	Shiv Sena (UBT)	INDIA
32	Raigad	Sunil Tatkare	Nationalist Congress Party	NDA
33	Maval	Shrirang Barne	Shiv Sena	NDA
34	Pune	Murlidhar Mohol	Bharatiya Janata Party	NDA
35	Baramati	Supriya Sule	Nationalist Congress Party (Sharadchandra Pawar)	INDIA
36	Shirur	Amol Kolhe	Nationalist Congress Party (Sharadchandra Pawar)	INDIA
37	Ahmednagar	Nilesh Lanke	Nationalist Congress Party (Sharadchandra Pawar)	INDIA
38	Shirdi (SC)	Bhausaheb Wakchaure	Shiv Sena	NDA
39	Beed	Bajrang Sonwane	Nationalist Congress Party (Sharadchandra Pawar)	INDIA
40	Osmanabad	Omprakash Rajenimbalkar	Shiv Sena	NDA
41	Latur (SC)	Shivaji Kalge	Indian National Congress	INDIA
42	Solapur (SC)	Praniti Shinde	Indian National Congress	INDIA
43	Madha	Dhairyasheel Mohite Patil	Nationalist Congress Party (Sharadchandra Pawar)	INDIA
44	Sangli	Vishal Patil	Independent	INDIA
45	Satara	Udayanraje Bhosale	Bharatiya Janata Party	NDA
46	Ratnagiri–Sindhudurg	Narayan Rane	Bharatiya Janata Party	NDA
47	Kolhapur	Chhatrapati Shahu Maharaj	Indian National Congress	INDIA
48	Hatkanangle	Dhairyasheel Mane	Shiv Sena	NDA

== Manipur ==

Keys:

INDIA (2)
- INC (2)

#	Constituency	Name	Party	Alliance
1	Inner Manipur	Angomcha Bimol Akoijam	Indian National Congress	INDIA
2	Outer Manipur (ST)	Alfred Kan-Ngam Arthur	Indian National Congress	INDIA

== Meghalaya ==

Keys:

INDIA (1)
- INC (1)
Vacant (1)

No.	Constituency	Name	Party	Alliance
1	Shillong (ST)	Ricky A. J. Syngkon (Died on 20 February 2026)	Voice of the People Party	INDIA
1	Shillong (ST)	Vacant		
2	Tura (ST)	Saleng A. Sangma	Indian National Congress	INDIA

== Mizoram ==

Keys:

ZPM (1)

#	Constituency	Name	Party	Alliance
1	Mizoram (ST)	Richard Vanlalhmangaiha	Zoram People's Movement	None

== Nagaland ==

Keys:

INDIA (1)
- INC (1)

#	Constituency	Name	Party	Alliance
1	Nagaland	S. Supongmeren Jamir	Indian National Congress	INDIA

== Odisha ==

Keys:

NDA (20)
- BJP (20)
INDIA (1)
- INC (1)

No.	Constituency	Name	Party	Alliance
1	Bargarh	Pradip Purohit	Bharatiya Janata Party	NDA
2	Sundargarh (ST)	Jual Oram	Bharatiya Janata Party	NDA
3	Sambalpur	Dharmendra Pradhan	Bharatiya Janata Party	NDA
4	Keonjhar (ST)	Ananta Nayak	Bharatiya Janata Party	NDA
5	Mayurbhanj (ST)	Naba Charan Majhi	Bharatiya Janata Party	NDA
6	Balasore	Pratap Chandra Sarangi	Bharatiya Janata Party	NDA
7	Bhadrak (SC)	Avimanyu Sethi	Bharatiya Janata Party	NDA
8	Jajpur (SC)	Rabindra Narayan Behera	Bharatiya Janata Party	NDA
9	Dhenkanal	Rudra Narayan Pany	Bharatiya Janata Party	NDA
10	Bolangir	Sangeeta Kumari Singh Deo	Bharatiya Janata Party	NDA
11	Kalahandi	Malvika Devi	Bharatiya Janata Party	NDA
12	Nabarangpur (ST)	Balabhadra Majhi	Bharatiya Janata Party	NDA
13	Kandhamal	Sukanta Kumar Panigrahi	Bharatiya Janata Party	NDA
14	Cuttack	Bhartruhari Mahtab	Bharatiya Janata Party	NDA
15	Kendrapara	Baijayant Panda	Bharatiya Janata Party	NDA
16	Jagatsinghpur (SC)	Bibhu Prasad Tarai	Bharatiya Janata Party	NDA
17	Puri	Sambit Patra	Bharatiya Janata Party	NDA
18	Bhubaneswar	Aparajita Sarangi	Bharatiya Janata Party	NDA
19	Aska	Anita Subhadarshini	Bharatiya Janata Party	NDA
20	Berhampur	Pradeep Kumar Panigrahy	Bharatiya Janata Party	NDA
21	Koraput (ST)	Saptagiri Sankar Ulaka	Indian National Congress	INDIA

== Puducherry ==
Keys:

INDIA (1)
- INC (1)

No.	Constituency	Name	Party	Alliance
1	Puducherry	V. Vaithilingam	Indian National Congress	INDIA

== Punjab ==
As of 2026

2024 Result

Keys:

INDIA (7)
- INC (7)
Other (6)
- AAP (3)
- AD (WPD) (2)
- SAD (1)

No.	Constituency	Name	Party	Alliance
1	Gurdaspur	Sukhjinder Singh Randhawa	Indian National Congress	INDIA
2	Amritsar	Gurjeet Singh Aujla	Indian National Congress	INDIA
3	Khadoor Sahib	Amritpal Singh	Akali Dal (Waris Punjab De) (Note: Amritpal Singh and Sarabjeet Singh Khalsa formed the Akali Dal (Waris Punjab De).)	None
4	Jalandhar (SC)	Charanjit Singh Channi	Indian National Congress	INDIA
5	Hoshiarpur (SC)	Raj Kumar Chabbewal	Aam Aadmi Party	None
6	Anandpur Sahib	Malwinder Singh Kang	Aam Aadmi Party	None
7	Ludhiana	Amrinder Singh Raja Warring	Indian National Congress	INDIA
8	Fatehgarh Sahib (SC)	Amar Singh	Indian National Congress	INDIA
9	Faridkot (SC)	Sarabjeet Singh Khalsa	Akali Dal (Waris Punjab De)	None
10	Firozpur	Sher Singh Ghubaya	Indian National Congress	INDIA
11	Bathinda	Harsimrat Kaur Badal	Shiromani Akali Dal	None
12	Sangrur	Gurmeet Singh Meet Hayer	Aam Aadmi Party	None
13	Patiala	Dharamvir Gandhi	Indian National Congress	INDIA

== Rajasthan ==

Keys:

NDA (14)
- BJP (14)
INDIA (11)
- INC (8)
- CPI(M) (1)
- BAP (1)
- RLP (1)

No.	Constituency	Name	Party	Alliance
1	Ganganagar (SC)	Kuldeep Indora	Indian National Congress	INDIA
2	Bikaner (SC)	Arjun Ram Meghwal	Bharatiya Janata Party	NDA
3	Churu	Rahul Kaswan	Indian National Congress	INDIA
4	Jhunjhunu	Brijendra Singh Ola	Indian National Congress	INDIA
5	Sikar	Amra Ram	Communist Party of India (Marxist)	INDIA
6	Jaipur Rural	Rao Rajendra Singh	Bharatiya Janata Party	NDA
7	Jaipur	Manju Sharma	Bharatiya Janata Party	NDA
8	Alwar	Bhupender Yadav	Bharatiya Janata Party	NDA
9	Bharatpur (SC)	Sanjana Jatav	Indian National Congress	INDIA
10	Karauli–Dholpur (SC)	Bhajan Lal Jatav	Indian National Congress	INDIA
11	Dausa (ST)	Murari Lal Meena	Indian National Congress	INDIA
12	Tonk–Sawai Madhopur	Harish Meena	Indian National Congress	INDIA
13	Ajmer	Bhagirath Chaudhary	Bharatiya Janata Party	NDA
14	Nagaur	Hanuman Beniwal	Rashtriya Loktantrik Party	INDIA
15	Pali	P. P. Chaudhary	Bharatiya Janata Party	NDA
16	Jodhpur	Gajendra Singh Shekhawat	Bharatiya Janata Party	NDA
17	Barmer	Ummeda Ram Beniwal	Indian National Congress	INDIA
18	Jalore	Lumbaram Choudhary	Bharatiya Janata Party	NDA
19	Udaipur (ST)	Manna Lal Rawat	Bharatiya Janata Party	NDA
20	Banswara (ST)	Rajkumar Roat	Bharat Adivasi Party	INDIA
21	Chittorgarh	Chandra Prakash Joshi	Bharatiya Janata Party	NDA
22	Rajsamand	Mahima Kumari Mewar	Bharatiya Janata Party	NDA
23	Bhilwara	Damodar Agarwal	Bharatiya Janata Party	NDA
24	Kota	Om Birla	Bharatiya Janata Party	NDA
25	Jhalawar–Baran	Dushyant Singh	Bharatiya Janata Party	NDA

== Sikkim ==

Keys:

NDA (1)
- SKM (1)

#	Constituency	Name	Party	Alliance
1	Sikkim	Indra Hang Subba	Sikkim Krantikari Morcha	NDA

== Tamil Nadu ==

Keys:

Other (22)
- DMK (22)

INDIA (17)
- INC (9)
- VCK (2)
- CPI(M) (2)
- CPI (2)
- IUML (1)
- MDMK (1)

#	Constituency	Name	Party	Alliance
1	Thiruvallur (SC)	Sasikanth Senthil	Indian National Congress	INDIA
2	Chennai North	Kalanidhi Veeraswamy	Dravida Munnetra Kazhagam	None
3	Chennai South	Tamizhachi Thangapandian	Dravida Munnetra Kazhagam	None
4	Chennai Central	Dayanidhi Maran	Dravida Munnetra Kazhagam	None
5	Sriperumbudur	T.R. Baalu	Dravida Munnetra Kazhagam	None
6	Kancheepuram (SC)	G. Selvam	Dravida Munnetra Kazhagam	None
7	Arakkonam	S. Jagathrakshakan	Dravida Munnetra Kazhagam	None
8	Vellore	D.M.K. Anand	Dravida Munnetra Kazhagam	None
9	Krishnagiri	K. Gopinath	Indian National Congress	INDIA
10	Dharmapuri	A. Mani	Dravida Munnetra Kazhagam	None
11	Tiruvannamalai	C.N. Annadurai	Dravida Munnetra Kazhagam	None
12	Arani	M.S. Tharanivendhan	Dravida Munnetra Kazhagam	None
13	Viluppuram (SC)	Durai Ravikumar	Viduthalai Chiruthaigal Katchi	INDIA
14	Kallakurichi	Malaiyarasan D	Dravida Munnetra Kazhagam	None
15	Salem	T. M. Selvaganapathi	Dravida Munnetra Kazhagam	None
16	Namakkal	V. S. Matheswaran	Dravida Munnetra Kazhagam	None
17	Erode	K. E. Prakash	Dravida Munnetra Kazhagam	None
18	Tiruppur	K. Subbarayan	Communist Party of India	INDIA
19	Nilgiris (SC)	A. Raja	Dravida Munnetra Kazhagam	None
20	Coimbatore	Ganapathi P. Raj Kumar	Dravida Munnetra Kazhagam	None
21	Pollachi	Eswarasamy	Dravida Munnetra Kazhagam	None
22	Dindigul	R. Sachidanandam	Communist Party of India (Marxist)	INDIA
23	Karur	Jothimani	Indian National Congress	INDIA
24	Tiruchirappalli	Durai Vaiyapuri	Marumalarchi Dravida Munnetra Kazhagam	INDIA
25	Perambalur	Arun Nehru	Dravida Munnetra Kazhagam	None
26	Cuddalore	M. K. Vishnu Prasad	Indian National Congress	INDIA
27	Chidambaram (SC)	Thol. Thirumavalavan	Viduthalai Chiruthaigal Katchi	INDIA
28	Mayiladuthurai	Sudha Ramakrishnan	Indian National Congress	INDIA
29	Nagapattinam (SC)	Selvaraj V	Communist Party of India	INDIA
30	Thanjavur	S. Murasoli	Dravida Munnetra Kazhagam	None
31	Sivaganga	Karti Chidambaram	Indian National Congress	INDIA
32	Madurai	S. Venkatesan	Communist Party of India (Marxist)	INDIA
33	Theni	Thanga Tamil Selvan	Dravida Munnetra Kazhagam	None
34	Virudhunagar	Manickam Tagore	Indian National Congress	INDIA
35	Ramanathapuram	Navas Kani	Indian Union Muslim League	INDIA
36	Thoothukkudi	Kanimozhi Karunanidhi	Dravida Munnetra Kazhagam	None
37	Tenkasi (SC)	Rani Srikumar	Dravida Munnetra Kazhagam	None
38	Tirunelveli	Robert Bruce	Indian National Congress	INDIA
39	Kanniyakumari	Vijay Vasanth	Indian National Congress	INDIA

== Telangana ==

Keys:

NDA (8)
- BJP (8)
INDIA (8)
- INC (8)
AIMIM (1)

No.	Constituency	Name	Party	Alliance
1	Adilabad (ST)	Godam Nagesh	Bharatiya Janata Party	NDA
2	Peddapalle (SC)	Vamsi Krishna Gaddam	Indian National Congress	INDIA
3	Karimnagar	Bandi Sanjay Kumar	Bharatiya Janata Party	NDA
4	Nizamabad	Dharmapuri Arvind	Bharatiya Janata Party	NDA
5	Zahirabad	Suresh Shetkar	Indian National Congress	INDIA
6	Medak	Raghunandan Rao	Bharatiya Janata Party	NDA
7	Malkajgiri	Etela Rajender	Bharatiya Janata Party	NDA
8	Secunderabad	G. Kishan Reddy	Bharatiya Janata Party	NDA
9	Hyderabad	Asaduddin Owaisi	All India Majlis-e-Ittehadul Muslimeen	None
10	Chevella	Konda Vishweshwar Reddy	Bharatiya Janata Party	NDA
11	Mahbubnagar	D. K. Aruna	Bharatiya Janata Party	NDA
12	Nagarkurnool (SC)	Mallu Ravi	Indian National Congress	INDIA
13	Nalgonda	Raghuveer Reddy Kunduru	Indian National Congress	INDIA
14	Bhongir	Chamala Kiran Kumar Reddy	Indian National Congress	INDIA
15	Warangal (SC)	Kadiyam Kavya	Indian National Congress	INDIA
16	Mahabubabad (ST)	Balram Naik	Indian National Congress	INDIA
17	Khammam	R. Raghuram Reddy	Indian National Congress	INDIA

== Tripura ==

Keys:

NDA (2)
- BJP (2)

No.	Constituency	Name	Party	Alliance
1	Tripura West	Biplab Kumar Deb	Bharatiya Janata Party	NDA
2	Tripura East (ST)	Kriti Devi Debbarman	Bharatiya Janata Party	NDA

== Uttar Pradesh ==

Keys:

INDIA (43)
- SP (37)
- INC (6)
NDA (36)
- BJP (33)
- RLD (2)
- AD(S) (1)
Others
ASP(KR) (1)

#	Constituency	Name	Party	Alliance
1	Saharanpur	Imran Masood	Indian National Congress	INDIA
2	Kairana	Iqra Choudhary	Samajwadi Party	INDIA
3	Muzaffarnagar	Harendra Singh Malik	Samajwadi Party	INDIA
4	Bijnor	Chandan Chauhan	Rashtriya Lok Dal	NDA
5	Nagina (SC)	Chandrashekhar Azad	Aazad Samaj Party (Kanshi Ram)	None
6	Moradabad	Ruchi Veera	Samajwadi Party	INDIA
7	Rampur	Mohibbullah Nadvi	Samajwadi Party	INDIA
8	Sambhal	Zia ur Rahman Barq	Samajwadi Party	INDIA
9	Amroha	Kanwar Singh Tanwar	Bharatiya Janata Party	NDA
10	Meerut	Arun Govil	Bharatiya Janata Party	NDA
11	Baghpat	Rajkumar Sangwan	Rashtriya Lok Dal	NDA
12	Ghaziabad	Atul Garg	Bharatiya Janata Party	NDA
13	Gautam Buddha Nagar	Mahesh Sharma	Bharatiya Janata Party	NDA
14	Bulandshahr (SC)	Bhola Singh	Bharatiya Janata Party	NDA
15	Aligarh	Satish Kumar Gautam	Bharatiya Janata Party	NDA
16	Hathras (SC)	Anoop Pradhan	Bharatiya Janata Party	NDA
17	Mathura	Hema Malini	Bharatiya Janata Party	NDA
18	Agra (SC)	S.P. Singh Baghel	Bharatiya Janata Party	NDA
19	Fatehpur Sikri	Rajkumar Chahar	Bharatiya Janata Party	NDA
20	Firozabad	Akshay Yadav	Samajwadi Party	INDIA
21	Mainpuri	Dimple Yadav	Samajwadi Party	INDIA
22	Etah	Devesh Shakya	Samajwadi Party	INDIA
23	Badaun	Aditya Yadav	Samajwadi Party	INDIA
24	Aonla	Neeraj Kushwaha Maurya	Samajwadi Party	INDIA
25	Bareilly	Chhatrapal Singh Gangwar	Bharatiya Janata Party	NDA
26	Pilibhit	Jitin Prasada	Bharatiya Janata Party	NDA
27	Shahjahanpur (SC)	Arun Kumar Sagar	Bharatiya Janata Party	NDA
28	Kheri	Utkarsh Verma	Samajwadi Party	INDIA
29	Dhaurahra	Anand Bhadauriya	Samajwadi Party	INDIA
30	Sitapur	Rakesh Rathore	Indian National Congress	INDIA
31	Hardoi (SC)	Jai Prakash	Bharatiya Janata Party	NDA
32	Misrikh (SC)	Ashok Kumar Rawat	Bharatiya Janata Party	NDA
33	Unnao	Sakshi Maharaj	Bharatiya Janata Party	NDA
34	Mohanlalganj (SC)	R. K. Chaudhary	Samajwadi Party	INDIA
35	Lucknow	Rajnath Singh	Bharatiya Janata Party	NDA
36	Rae Bareli	Rahul Gandhi	Indian National Congress	INDIA
37	Amethi	Kishori Lal Sharma	Indian National Congress	INDIA
38	Sultanpur	Rambhual Nishad	Samajwadi Party	INDIA
39	Pratapgarh	S. P. Singh Patel	Samajwadi Party	INDIA
40	Farrukhabad	Mukesh Rajput	Bharatiya Janata Party	NDA
41	Etawah (SC)	Jitendra Kumar Dohare	Samajwadi Party	INDIA
42	Kannauj	Akhilesh Yadav	Samajwadi Party	INDIA
43	Kanpur	Ramesh Awasthi	Bharatiya Janata Party	NDA
44	Akbarpur	Devendra Singh Bhole	Bharatiya Janata Party	NDA
45	Jalaun (SC)	Narayan Das Ahirwar	Samajwadi Party	INDIA
46	Jhansi	Anurag Sharma	Bharatiya Janata Party	NDA
47	Hamirpur	Ajendra Singh Lodhi	Samajwadi Party	INDIA
48	Banda	Krishna Devi Patel	Samajwadi Party	INDIA
49	Fatehpur	Naresh Uttam Patel	Samajwadi Party	INDIA
50	Kaushambi (SC)	Pushpendra Saroj	Samajwadi Party	INDIA
51	Phulpur	Praveen Patel	Bharatiya Janata Party	NDA
52	Allahabad	Ujjwal Rewati Raman Singh	Indian National Congress	INDIA
53	Barabanki (SC)	Tanuj Punia	Indian National Congress	INDIA
54	Faizabad	Awadhesh Prasad	Samajwadi Party	INDIA
55	Ambedkar Nagar	Lalji Verma	Samajwadi Party	INDIA
56	Bahraich (SC)	Anand Kumar	Bharatiya Janata Party	NDA
57	Kaiserganj	Karan Bhushan Singh	Bharatiya Janata Party	NDA
58	Shrawasti	Ram Shiromani Verma	Samajwadi Party	INDIA
59	Gonda	Kirti Vardhan Singh	Bharatiya Janata Party	NDA
60	Domariyaganj	Jagdambika Pal	Bharatiya Janata Party	NDA
61	Basti	Ram Prasad Chaudhary	Samajwadi Party	INDIA
62	Sant Kabir Nagar	Laxmikant Nishad	Samajwadi Party	INDIA
63	Maharajganj	Pankaj Chaudhary	Bharatiya Janata Party	NDA
64	Gorakhpur	Ravi Kishan	Bharatiya Janata Party	NDA
65	Kushi Nagar	Vijay Kumar Dubey	Bharatiya Janata Party	NDA
66	Deoria	Shashank Mani	Bharatiya Janata Party	NDA
67	Bansgaon (SC)	Kamlesh Paswan	Bharatiya Janata Party	NDA
68	Lalganj (SC)	Daroga Saroj	Samajwadi Party	INDIA
69	Azamgarh	Dharmendra Yadav	Samajwadi Party	INDIA
70	Ghosi	Rajeev Kumar Rai	Samajwadi Party	INDIA
71	Salempur	Ramashankar Rajbhar	Samajwadi Party	INDIA
72	Ballia	Sanatan Pandey	Samajwadi Party	INDIA
73	Jaunpur	Babu Singh Kushwaha	Samajwadi Party	INDIA
74	Machhlishahr (SC)	Priya Saroj	Samajwadi Party	INDIA
75	Ghazipur	Afzal Ansari	Samajwadi Party	INDIA
76	Chandauli	Bijendra Singh	Samajwadi Party	INDIA
77	Varanasi	Narendra Modi	Bharatiya Janata Party	NDA
78	Bhadohi	Vinod Kumar Bind	Bharatiya Janata Party	NDA
79	Mirzapur	Anupriya Patel	Apna Dal (Soneylal)	NDA
80	Robertsganj (SC)	Chhotelal Kharwar	Samajwadi Party	INDIA

== Uttarakhand ==

Keys:

NDA (5)
- BJP (5)

No.	Constituency	Name	Party	Alliance
1	Tehri Garhwal	Mala Rajya Laxmi Shah	Bharatiya Janata Party	NDA
2	Garhwal	Anil Baluni	Bharatiya Janata Party	NDA
3	Almora (SC)	Ajay Tamta	Bharatiya Janata Party	NDA
4	Nainital–Udhamsingh Nagar	Ajay Bhatt	Bharatiya Janata Party	NDA
5	Haridwar	Trivendra Singh Rawat	Bharatiya Janata Party	NDA

== West Bengal ==
As of 2026

2024 Election Result

Keys:

NDA (32)
- NCPI (20)
- BJP (12)
INDIA (9)
- MAITC (8)
- INC (1)
Vacant (1)

No.	Constituency	Name	Party	Alliance
1	Cooch Behar (SC)	Jagadish Basunia (Note: Switched from AITC to NCPI on 14 June 2026.)	Nationalist Citizens Party of India	NDA
2	Alipurduars (ST)	Manoj Tigga	Bharatiya Janata Party	NDA
3	Jalpaiguri (SC)	Jayanta Kumar Roy	Bharatiya Janata Party	NDA
4	Darjeeling	Raju Bista	Bharatiya Janata Party	NDA
5	Raiganj	Kartick Chandra Paul	Bharatiya Janata Party	NDA
6	Balurghat	Sukanta Majumdar	Bharatiya Janata Party	NDA
7	Maldaha Uttar	Khagen Murmu	Bharatiya Janata Party	NDA
8	Maldaha Dakshin	Isha Khan Choudhury	Indian National Congress	INDIA
9	Jangipur	Khalilur Rahaman	Nationalist Citizens Party of India	NDA
10	Baharampur	Yusuf Pathan	Nationalist Citizens Party of India	NDA
11	Murshidabad	Abu Taher Khan	Nationalist Citizens Party of India	NDA
12	Krishnanagar	Mahua Moitra	Mamata All India Trinamool Congress	INDIA
13	Ranaghat (SC)	Jagannath Sarkar	Bharatiya Janata Party	NDA
14	Bangaon (SC)	Shantanu Thakur	Bharatiya Janata Party	NDA
15	Barrackpur	Partha Bhowmick	Nationalist Citizens Party of India	NDA
16	Dum Dum	Saugata Roy	Mamata All India Trinamool Congress	INDIA
17	Barasat	Kakoli Ghosh Dastidar	Nationalist Citizens Party of India	NDA
18	Basirhat	Haji Nurul Islam (Died on 25 September 2024)	Trinamool Congress	INDIA
18	Basirhat	Vacant		
19	Jaynagar (SC)	Pratima Mondal	Mamata All India Trinamool Congress	INDIA
20	Mathurapur (SC)	Bapi Halder	Nationalist Citizens Party of India	NDA
21	Diamond Harbour	Abhishek Banerjee	Mamata All India Trinamool Congress	INDIA
22	Jadavpur	Saayoni Ghosh	Nationalist Citizens Party of India	NDA
23	Kolkata Dakshin	Mala Roy	Nationalist Citizens Party of India	NDA
24	Kolkata Uttar	Sudip Bandyopadhyay	Nationalist Citizens Party of India	NDA
25	Howrah	Prasun Banerjee	Nationalist Citizens Party of India	NDA
26	Uluberia	Sajda Ahmed	Mamata All India Trinamool Congress	INDIA
27	Sreerampur	Kalyan Banerjee	Mamata All India Trinamool Congress	INDIA
28	Hooghly	Rachana Banerjee	Nationalist Citizens Party of India	NDA
29	Arambagh (SC)	Mitali Bag	Nationalist Citizens Party of India	NDA
30	Tamluk	Abhijit Gangopadhyay	Bharatiya Janata Party	NDA
31	Kanthi	Soumendu Adhikari	Bharatiya Janata Party	NDA
32	Ghatal	Deepak Adhikari	Nationalist Citizens Party of India	NDA
33	Jhargram (ST)	Kalipada Soren	Nationalist Citizens Party of India	NDA
34	Medinipur	June Malia	Nationalist Citizens Party of India	NDA
35	Purulia	Jyotirmay Singh Mahato	Bharatiya Janata Party	NDA
36	Bankura	Arup Chakraborty	Nationalist Citizens Party of India	NDA
37	Bishnupur (SC)	Saumitra Khan	Bharatiya Janata Party	NDA
38	Bardhaman Purba (SC)	Sharmila Sarkar	Nationalist Citizens Party of India	NDA
39	Bardhaman–Durgapur	Kirti Azad	Mamata All India Trinamool Congress	INDIA
40	Asansol	Shatrughan Sinha	Mamata All India Trinamool Congress	INDIA
41	Bolpur (SC)	Asit Kumar Mal	Nationalist Citizens Party of India	NDA
42	Birbhum	Satabdi Roy	Nationalist Citizens Party of India	NDA

== Membership by party ==
No. of Lok Sabha MP's party-wise:

As of 11 November 2026

Alliance	Party	No. of MPs	Leader of the Party
Government; NDA; Seats: 319	BJP	241	Narendra Modi (Leader of the House)
Government; NDA; Seats: 319	NCPI	20	Kakoli Ghosh Dastidar
Government; NDA; Seats: 319	TDP	16	Lavu Sri Krishna Devarayalu
Government; NDA; Seats: 319	SHS	13	Shrikant Shinde
Government; NDA; Seats: 319	JD(U)	12	Dileshwar Kamait
Government; NDA; Seats: 319	LJP(RV)	5	Chirag Paswan
Government; NDA; Seats: 319	JD(S)	2	M. Mallesh Babu
Government; NDA; Seats: 319	JSP	2	Vallabhaneni Balashowry
Government; NDA; Seats: 319	RLD	2	Rajkumar Sangwan
Government; NDA; Seats: 319	AD(S)	1	Anupriya Patel
Government; NDA; Seats: 319	AGP	1	Phani Bhusan Choudhury
Government; NDA; Seats: 319	AJSU	1	Chandra Prakash Choudhary
Government; NDA; Seats: 319	HAM(S)	1	Jitan Ram Manjhi
Government; NDA; Seats: 319	NCP	1	Sunil Tatkare
Government; NDA; Seats: 319	SKM	1	Indra Hang Subba
INDIA; Seats: 183	INC	98	Rahul Gandhi (Leader of the Opposition)
INDIA; Seats: 183	SP	37	Akhilesh Yadav
INDIA; Seats: 183	MAITC	8	Abhishek Banerjee
INDIA; Seats: 183	NCP-SP	8	Supriya Sule
INDIA; Seats: 183	CPI(M)	4	K. Radhakrishnan
INDIA; Seats: 183	RJD	4	Abhay Kumar Sinha
INDIA; Seats: 183	SS(UBT)	3	Arvind Sawant
INDIA; Seats: 183	IUML	3	E. T. Mohammed Basheer
INDIA; Seats: 183	JMM	3	Joba Majhi
INDIA; Seats: 183	CPI	2	K. Subbarayan
INDIA; Seats: 183	CPI(ML)L	2	Raja Ram Singh
INDIA; Seats: 183	JKNC	1	Mian Altaf Ahmed
INDIA; Seats: 183	VCK	2	Thol. Thirumavalavan
INDIA; Seats: 183	BAP	1	Rajkumar Roat
INDIA; Seats: 183	KEC	1	Francis George
INDIA; Seats: 183	MDMK	1	Durai Vaiko
INDIA; Seats: 183	RLP	1	Hanuman Beniwal
INDIA; Seats: 183	RSP	1	N. K. Premachandran
INDIA; Seats: 183	IND	3	Pappu Yadav; Mohmad Haneefa; Vishal Patil
Unaligned; Seats: 38	DMK	22	T. R. Baalu
Unaligned; Seats: 38	YSRCP	4	P. V. Midhun Reddy
Unaligned; Seats: 38	AAP	3	Gurmeet Singh Meet Hayer
Unaligned; Seats: 38	AD (WPD)	2	Sarabjeet Singh Khalsa
Unaligned; Seats: 38	AIMIM	1	Asaduddin Owaisi
Unaligned; Seats: 38	ASP(KR)	1	Chandrashekhar Azad
Unaligned; Seats: 38	SAD	1	Harsimrat Kaur Badal
Unaligned; Seats: 38	UPPL	1	Joyanta Basumatary
Unaligned; Seats: 38	ZPM	1	Richard Vanlalhmangaiha
Unaligned; Seats: 38	JKAIP	1	Sheikh Abdul Rashid
Unaligned; Seats: 38	IND	1	Umeshbhai Patel
Vacant		3	Basirhat; Shillong; Srinagar
Total		543	

== See also ==
- Lok Sabha
- Rajya Sabha
- 18th Lok Sabha
- List of current members of the Rajya Sabha
- List of constituencies of the Lok Sabha
- Member of Parliament, Lok Sabha
- Member of Parliament, Rajya Sabha
- 2024 Indian General Election Result
