= 1962 Madhya Pradesh Legislative Assembly election =

State assembly election in India

- 19 February 1962

All 288 seats in the Madhya Pradesh Legislative Assembly 145 seats needed for a majority
- Registered: 15,874,238
- Turnout: 44.52%
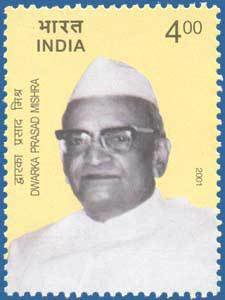

	First party	Second party
Leader	Dwarka Prasad Mishra	undeclared
Party	INC	ABJS
Last election	232	10
Seats won	142	42
Seat change	▼90	▲32
Percentage	38.54%	16.66%
Chief Minister before election
Kailash Nath Katju
INC
Elected Chief Minister
Dwarka Prasad Mishra
INC

Elections to the Madhya Pradesh Legislative Assembly were held in February 1962. 1,336 candidates contested for the 288 constituencies in the Assembly. The Indian National Congress won the most seats and Dwarka Prasad Mishra was sworn in for his second term as the Chief Minister.

After the passing of The Delimitation of Parliamentary and Assembly Constituencies Order, 1961, double-member constituencies were eliminated and Madhya Pradesh's Legislative Assembly was assigned 288 single-member constituencies.

== Results ==
Party	Votes	%	Seats	+/–
Indian National Congress	2,527,257	38.54	142	▼90
Bharatiya Jana Sangh	1,092,237	16.66	41	▲31
Praja Socialist Party	703,188	10.72	33	▲21
Socialist Party	310,181	4.73	14	New
Akhil Bharatiya Ram Rajya Parishad	248,525	3.79	10	▲5
Hindu Mahasabha	211,639	3.23	6	▼1
Swatantra Party	80,470	1.23	2	New
Communist Party of India	132,440	2.02	1	▼1
Republican Party of India	82,345	1.26	0	New
All India Forward Bloc	16,913	0.26	0	New
Independents	1,151,955	17.57	39	▲19
Total	6,557,150	100.00	288	0
Valid votes	6,557,150	73.71		
Invalid/blank votes	2,338,719	26.29		
Total votes	8,895,869	100.00		
Registered voters/turnout	15,874,238	56.04		
Source: ECI

== Elected members ==
Constituency	Reserved for	Elected Member	Party
Morena District
Sheopur	None	Ram Swaroop	Hindu Mahasabha
Bijeypur	None	Naval Kishore	Independent
Sabalgarh	SC	Buddha Ram	Independent
Joura	None	Panchamsingh	Praja Socialist Party
Morena	None	Jabar Singh	Praja Socialist Party
Dimni	SC	Summer Singh Ammrayya	Independent
Ambah	None	Jagdish Singh	Praja Socialist Party
Bhind District
Gohad	None	Ramcharanlal	Praja Socialist Party
Attair	None	Ramkrishana	Indian National Congress
Bhind	None	Narsinghrao Jabarsingh	Indian National Congress
Mehgaon	None	Ramdhan Singh	Indian National Congress
Ron	None	Mahadeo Singh	Independent
Lahar	SC	Prabhudayal	Indian National Congress
Gwalior District
Bhander	SC	Raja Ram Singh	Indian National Congress
Dabra	None	Brinda Sahai	Indian National Congress
Gwalior	None	Prem Chand	Indian National Congress
Laskar	None	Ramniwas Bangad	Indian National Congress
Morar	None	Chandra Kala Sahai	Indian National Congress
Gird	None	Mahesh Dutta Mishra	Indian National Congress
Datia District
Seondha	None	Kamta Prasad	Indian National Congress
Datia	None	Surya Deo Sharma	Independent
Shivpuri District
Karera	None	Gautam Sharma	Indian National Congress
Pichhore	None	Laxmi Narayan	Hindu Mahasabha
Shivpuri	None	Anand Swaroop	Indian National Congress
Pohri	SC	Tularam	Indian National Congress
Kolaras	None	Manorama	Indian National Congress
Guna District
Guna	None	Brindawan Prasad	Hindu Mahasabha
Chachaura	None	Prabhu Lal	Independent
Raghogarh	SC	Dulichand	Indian National Congress
Ashoknagar	None	Ram Dayal Singh	Indian National Congress
Mungaoli	None	Chandra Bhan Singh	Praja Socialist Party
Tikamgarh District
Niwari	SC	Nathu Ram Niwari	Praja Socialist Party
Lidhaura	None	Lakshmi Narain	Praja Socialist Party
Jatara	None	Narendra Singh Dev	Independent
Tikamgarh	None	Gyanendra Singh Dev	Independent
Chhatarpur District
Malehra	SC	Hans Raj	Indian National Congress
Bijawar	None	Govind Singh Ju Deo	Independent
Chhatarpur	None	Ram Swaroop	Jana Sangh
Maharajpur	SC	Nathooram	Jana Sangh
Laundi	None	Raghunath Singh	Praja Socialist Party
Panna District
Panna	None	Narendra Singh	Indian National Congress
Devendranagar	None	Devendra Vijay Singh	Indian National Congress
Pawai	SC	Jagsuriya	Jana Sangh
Satna District
Maihar	None	Gopal Sharan Singh	Indian National Congress
Amarpatan	None	Gulsher Ahmad	Indian National Congress
Raghurajnagar	None	Govind Narayan Singh	Indian National Congress
Unchera	SC	Gaya Deen	Jana Sangh
Satna	None	Sukhendra Singh	Jana Sangh
Baraundha	None	Ram Chand	Indian National Congress
Rewa District
Teonthar	None	Lal Kamleshwar Singh	Indian National Congress
Mangawan	None	Rukmini Raman Pratap Singh	Indian National Congress
Sirmaur	None	Jamuna Prasad	Praja Socialist Party
Rewa	None	Shatrughan Singh	Indian National Congress
Gurh	None	Vrajraj Singh	Indian National Congress
Deotalao	None	Raghvendra Singh	Indian National Congress
Mauganj	SC	Chhotelal	Indian National Congress
Sidhi District
Sidhi	None	Chandra Pratap Tiwari	Praja Socialist Party
Deosar	None	Laxmi Kant	Indian National Congress
Singrauli	None	Shyam Kartik	Socialist Party of India
Gopadbanas	ST	Dadhi Singh	Praja Socialist Party
Majhauli	None	Arjun Singh	Indian National Congress
Shahdol District
Beohari	None	Ram Kishore Shukla	Socialist Party of India
Bandhogarh	None	Mishrilal	Socialist Party of India
Sohagpur	None	Shambhunath	Indian National Congress
Pushparajgarh	ST	Chinta Ram	Praja Socialist Party
Burhar	None	Krishna Pal Singh	Socialist Party of India
Kotma	ST	Girja Kumari	Indian National Congress
Jaitpur	ST	Ram Prasad	Socialist Party of India
Surguja District
Manendragarh	ST	Ratti Ram	Indian National Congress
Baikunthpur	None	Jawala Prasad	Praja Socialist Party
Bhaiyathan	ST	Mahadeo Singh	Indian National Congress
Surajpur	None	Bansrup	Akhil Bharatiya Ram Rajya Parishad
Pal	None	Chandikeshwar Saran	Indian National Congress
Samri	ST	Jai Ram	Independent
Lundra	SC	Atmaram Ingole	Jana Sangh
Ambikapur	None	Amresh Prasad	Independent
Sitapur	ST	Mokshmadan Singh	Indian National Congress
Raigarh District
Jashpur	ST	Shakuntala Devi	Akhil Bharatiya Ram Rajya Parishad
Bagicha	None	Nairityapal	Akhil Bharatiya Ram Rajya Parishad
Lailunga	None	Narhiri Prasad	Akhil Bharatiya Ram Rajya Parishad
Ghargoda	ST	Surendra Kumar Singh	Indian National Congress
Pathalgaon	ST	Laljit Singh	Akhil Bharatiya Ram Rajya Parishad
Dharamjaigarh	None	Kishori Mohan	Indian National Congress
Raigarh	None	Niranjan Lal	Indian National Congress
Pussour	None	Nareshchandra Singh	Indian National Congress
Sarangarh	SC	Nanhudai	Indian National Congress
Bilaspur District
Chandrapur	None	Dhansai	Indian National Congress
Malkharoda	SC	Vedram	Indian National Congress
Sakti	None	Tankrajeshwari	Indian National Congress
Champa	None	Jiwanlal	Jana Sangh
Nawagarh	None	Bisahu Das Mahant	Indian National Congress
Akaltara	None	Thakur Bhuwan Bhaskar Singh	Indian National Congress
Janjgir	None	Rameshwar Prasad Sharma	Indian National Congress
Barpali	None	Pyarelal	Independent
Katghora	ST	Rudrasaran Pratap Singh	Indian National Congress
Tanakhar	ST	Yagyaseni Kumari	Indian National Congress
Gaurella	None	Mathura Prasad Dube	Indian National Congress
Kota	ST	Lal Chandrasekhar Singh	Indian National Congress
Lormi	None	Yeshwantraj Singh	Akhil Bharatiya Ram Rajya Parishad
Mungeli	SC	Mool Chand	Indian National Congress
Jarhagaon	None	Sheo Prasad	Indian National Congress
Takhatpur	None	Murlidhar Mishra	Indian National Congress
Bilaspur	None	Ramcharan Rai	Indian National Congress
Masturi	SC	Ganeshram Anant	Indian National Congress
Belha	None	Chitrakant Jayaswal	Indian National Congress
Raipur District
Bhatapara	None	Sheolal Mehta	Indian National Congress
Dharsiwan	None	Hari Prem Baghel	Praja Socialist Party
Baloda	None	Bazar Manohar Das	Indian National Congress
Pallari	SC	Bhanwar Singh	Praja Socialist Party
Kasdol	None	Bhupendra Nath	Indian National Congress
Bhatgaon	SC	Reshamlal Jangade	Indian National Congress
Saraipali	None	Rajmahendra Bahadur Singh	Independent
Basna	None	Abdul Hamid Dani	Indian National Congress
Pithora	None	Pratap Singh	Praja Socialist Party
Mahasamund	SC	Paran	Praja Socialist Party
Arang	SC	Jagmohan Das	Indian National Congress
Abhanpur	None	Lakhanlal Gupta	Indian National Congress
Raipur	None	Sharda Charan Tiwari	Indian National Congress
Kurud	None	Yeshwant Rao	Jana Sangh
Rajim	None	Shyama Charan Shukla	Indian National Congress
Bindranawagarh	ST	Kham Singh	Praja Socialist Party
Dhamtari	None	Pandhari Rao	Jana Sangh
Sihawa	ST	Narayan Singh	Jana Sangh
Bastar District
Kanker	None	Bhanupratap Deo	Independent
Keskal	ST	Manku Ram Sodhi	Independent
Bhanpuri	SC	Mangal Singh	Independent
Jagdalpur	SC	Chaitu Mahra	Independent
Chitrakote	ST	Paklu Joga	Independent
Konta	ST	Bettijoga Hadma	Independent
Dantewara	ST	Lachhu	Independent
Bijapur	ST	Hira Shah	Indian National Congress
Narayanpur	ST	Ram Bharosa	Independent
Bhanupratappur	ST	Ram Prasad	Independent
Durg District
Chowki	ST	Deoprasad	Praja Socialist Party
Dondi Lohara	ST	Jhumuklal Bhendia	Indian National Congress
Balod	None	Kesholal Gomasta	Indian National Congress
Gunderdehi	None	Udai Ram	Indian National Congress
Bhilai	ST	Gopal Singh	Indian National Congress
Dhamdha	None	Ganesh Ram	Indian National Congress
Durg	None	Dhal Singh	Indian National Congress
Rajnandgaon	None	Eknath	Indian National Congress
Dengargaon	None	Madanlal Tiwari	Praja Socialist Party
Lal Bahadurnagar	SC	Tuman Lal	Indian National Congress
Dongargarh	None	Ganeshmal Bhandari	Indian National Congress
Khairagarh	None	Gyanendra Singh	Indian National Congress
Bemetara	None	Laxman Prasad	Indian National Congress
Maro	SC	Sheolal	Indian National Congress
Birendranagar	None	Padmavati Devi	Indian National Congress
Kawardha	None	Vishwaraj Singh	Akhil Bharatiya Ram Rajya Parishad
Balaghat District
Baihar	ST	Mahimalsingh Nawlsingh Masaram	Independent
Lanji	None	Narbada Prasad Ganga Prasad	Praja Socialist Party
Kirnapur	SC	Motiram Odgu	Indian National Congress
Waraseoni	None	Vipinlal Shankarlal Sao	Independent
Khairalanjee	None	Nilkanth Tukaram	Praja Socialist Party
Katangi	None	Ramlal Ojhi	Independent
Balaghat	None	Nandkishore Jaisraj	Indian National Congress
Paraswada	None	Ramniklal Amrutlal Trivedi	Indian National Congress
Mandla District
Mandla	None	Narayanidevi	Indian National Congress
Bichhiya	ST	Shankerlal	Akhil Bharatiya Ram Rajya Parishad
Ghughri	None	Dwarika Prasad Bilthare	Indian National Congress
Dindori	ST	Basorisingh	Praja Socialist Party
Mehedwani	ST	Roop Singh	Indian National Congress
Niwas	ST	Shahju	Indian National Congress
Jabalpur District
Bargi	None	Chandrika Prasad	Indian National Congress
Jabalpur 1	None	Kunji Lal Dubey	Indian National Congress
Jabalpur 2	None	Jagdishnarain	Indian National Congress
Jabalpur 3	None	Jagmohan Das	Indian National Congress
Panagar	None	Parmanand Bhai	Indian National Congress
Sihora	None	Kashi Prasad	Indian National Congress
Dhimerkheda	ST	Harbhagat Singh	Indian National Congress
Badwara	ST	Jagpati Singh	Indian National Congress
Bijai	None	Raghogarh Hari Prasad	Indian National Congress
Murwara	None	Ramdas	Socialist Party of India
Bahoriband	None	Balkrishna	Jana Sangh
Patan	SC	Narain Prasad	Indian National Congress
Damoh District
Nohata	None	K. B. L. Guru	Indian National Congress
Damoh	None	Anand Kumar	Independent
Hatta	None	Jugul Kishore	Independent
Patharia	SC	Rameshwar	Independent
Sagar District
Rehli	None	Mani Bhai Javer Bhai	Indian National Congress
Banda	None	Ramcharan Khuman	Jana Sangh
Bina	None	Bhagirath Ramdayal	Jana Sangh
Khurai	SC	Nand Lal Parmanand	Indian National Congress
Sagar	None	Haji Mohanmmad Shafi Sheikh Subharati	Indian National Congress
Surkhi	None	Bani Bhushan Premnarayan Rai	Indian National Congress
Deor	None	Krishna Kumar Gouri Shankar	Praja Socialist Party
Narsimhapur District
Gadarwara	None	Laxmi Narayan	Praja Socialist Party
Sainkheda	SC	L. A. Jamnik	Praja Socialist Party
Gotegaon	None	Shashibhushan Singh	Praja Socialist Party
Narsimhapur	None	Mahendra Singh	Praja Socialist Party
Seoni District
Lakhnadon	ST	Vasant Rao Uikey	Indian National Congress
Bhoma	None	Yogendranath Singh	Akhil Bharatiya Ram Rajya Parishad
Chhapara	ST	Thakur Deepsingh	Indian National Congress
Barghat	None	Jageshwernath Bisen	Praja Socialist Party
Seoni	None	Rajkumari Prabhawati	Akhil Bharatiya Ram Rajya Parishad
Chhindwara District
Chaurai	SC	Than Singh Hansa	Independent
Chhindwara	None	Vidyawati Vidyashanker Metha	Indian National Congress
Pagara	ST	Udaibhanshah Mardanshah	Indian National Congress
Parasia	None	Shanti Swaroop Kartaram	Independent
Damua	ST	Parasram Shivram Dhurve	Indian National Congress
Ramakona	ST	Ranchusingh Doma	Indian National Congress
Sausar	None	Sheshrao Govindrao	Independent
Betul District
Masod	None	Laxmibai Biharilal	Indian National Congress
Multai	None	Balkrishna	Indian National Congress
Ghoradongri	ST	Jangusingh Nizam	Jana Sangh
Betul	None	Deepchand Gothi	Indian National Congress
Bhainsdahi	ST	Daddusingh Balaji	Jana Sangh
Hoshangabad District
Harda	None	Laxmanrao Naik	Indian National Congress
Timarni	SC	Dhannalal Choudhary	Indian National Congress
Itarsi	None	Kunwar Singh	Praja Socialist Party
Hoshangabad	None	Sushila Devi Dixit	Indian National Congress
Piparia	ST	Ratan Kumari	Indian National Congress
Denwa	None	Vinaykumar Dewan	Praja Socialist Party
Raisen District
Udaipura	None	Shankar Dayal Sharma	Indian National Congress
Sanchi	None	Gulab Chand	Socialist Party of India
Bareli	ST	Raja Daulat Singh	Indian National Congress
Sehore District
Budhni	None	Bansi Dhar	Independent
Ashta	SC	Umrao Singh	Indian National Congress
Sehore	None	Maulana Inmayatullah Khan Tarzi Mashriqi	Indian National Congress
Bhopal	None	Khan Shakir Ali Khan	Communist Party of India
New Bhopal	None	Lokumal	Indian National Congress
Berasia	SC	Bhaiya Lal	Hindu Mahasabha
Vidisha District
Vidisha	SC	Gorelal	Hindu Mahasabha
Basoda	None	Ram Singh	Indian National Congress
Kurwai	None	Takhtamal Lunkaram	Indian National Congress
Sironj	None	Madan Lal	Hindu Mahasabha
Rajgarh District
Biaora	None	Ramkaran Ugra	Praja Socialist Party
Rajgarh	None	Shivprasad Satyendra Khujneri	Independent
Khilchipur	None	Harisingh Pawar	Independent
Sarangpur	SC	Gangram Jatav	Jana Sangh
Narsingarh	None	Bhanuprakash Singh	Independent
Shajapur District
Shujalpur	None	Vishnucharan	Indian National Congress
Gulana	SC	Hiralal	Jana Sangh
Shajapur	None	Ramesh Chandra	Jana Sangh
Susner	None	Hari Bhau	Jana Sangh
Agar	None	Madanlal	Jana Sangh
Ujjain District
Mahidpur	SC	Durgadas Bhagwandas	Indian National Congress
Taran	None	Madhavsingh Ramsingh	Jana Sangh
Ujjain North	None	Abdul Gayyur Qureshi	Indian National Congress
Ujjain South	None	Hansaben	Indian National Congress
Khachraud	None	Bhairav Bhartiya	Independent
Barnagar	None	Ramprakash Ishwardas	Socialist Party of India
Indore District
Depalpur	None	Bapusingh Ramsingh	Socialist Party of India
Mhow	None	Rustamji Kawasaji Jall	Indian National Congress
Indore City West	None	Mishrilal Gangwal	Indian National Congress
Indore City Central	None	Babulal Patodi	Indian National Congress
Indore City East	None	Gangaran Tiwari Ram Prasad Tiwari	Indian National Congress
Indore	None	Vyankatesh, Vishnu Dravid	Indian National Congress
Sawer	SC	Sajjansingh Vishnar	Indian National Congress
Dewas District
Dewas	SC	Bapulal	Indian National Congress
Sonkatch	None	Bhagirath Singh	Jana Sangh
Bagli	None	Kailash Chandra	Jana Sangh
Kannod	None	Chaturbhuj	Independent
East Nimar District
Harsud	None	Rao Bhimsingh	Swatantra Party
Khalwa	ST	Hiralal	Swatantra Party
Shahpur	None	Durgabai	Praja Socialist Party
Burhanpur	None	Abdul Quadir Siddiqui	Indian National Congress
Khandwa	None	Bhagwantrao Mandloi	Indian National Congress
Pandhana	SC	Deokaran	Indian National Congress
West Nimar District
Barwaha	None	Rana Balbahadarsingh Rana Bhawanisingh	Independent
Meheswar	SC	Bhikaji Tantya	Jana Sangh
Bhikangaon	None	Hiralal Yadav	Jana Sangh
Khargone	None	Bhalchandra Bagdare	Jana Sangh
Dhulkot	ST	Manoharsingh Chohan	Jana Sangh
Sendhwa	ST	Rupsingh Abdu	Jana Sangh
Barwani	ST	Daval Nana	Jana Sangh
Rajpur	ST	Devisingh Lonyaji	Jana Sangh
Dhar District
Manawar East	ST	Fatehbhan Singh	Indian National Congress
Dhar	None	Kanhiyalal	Indian National Congress
Badnawar	None	Govardhan	Jana Sangh
Sardarpur	None	Sumer Singh	Jana Sangh
Kukshi	ST	Babu	Jana Sangh
Jhabua District
Alirajpur	ST	Bhagirath Bhanwar	Socialist Party of India
Jobat	ST	Raysinha	Socialist Party of India
Jhabua	ST	Man Singh	Socialist Party of India
Thandla	ST	Pratap Sinha	Socialist Party of India
Ratlam District
Sailana	None	Laxmansingh Jhitra	Socialist Party of India
Ratlam	None	Babulal Nathulal	Independent
Alot	SC	Mayaram Nanda	Indian National Congress
Jaora	None	Laxminarayan Jamnalal	Jana Sangh
Mandsaur District
Mandsaur	None	Shyam Sunder Patidar	Indian National Congress
Sitamau	None	Mohansingh	Jana Sangh
Suwasra	SC	Champalal	Jana Sangh
Garoth	None	Mohanlal	Jana Sangh
Manasa	None	Sunderlal	Jana Sangh
Neemuch	None	Khumansingh	Jana Sangh
Jawad	None	Virendrakumar	Jana Sangh

== Bypolls ==
Year	Constituency	Reason for by-poll	Winning candidate	Party
1963	Parasia	Void of S.S. Kartaram	S. Dupey	Indian National Congress
1963	Morena	Void of J. Singh	H.R.S. Sarraf	Indian National Congress
1964	Bina	Void of P.B. Ramdayal	S.N. Mushran	Indian National Congress
1964	Sitamau	Void of M. Singh	K. Singh	Jan Sangh
1964	Sonkatch	Void of B. Singh	V. Singh	Jan Sangh
1965	Jabalpur - 3	Death of Jagmohan Das	H.K. Singh	Indian National Congress
1965	Berasia	Void of B. Lal's election	D.N. Vadivel	Indian National Congress
Source:ECI

== See also ==
- List of constituencies of the Chhattisgarh Legislative Assembly
- List of constituencies of the Madhya Pradesh Legislative Assembly
