= Raigarh Lok Sabha constituency =

Lok Sabha constituency in Chhattisgarh

Coordinates: 21.9°N 83.4°E

Raigarh CG-2
- Lok Sabha constituency

Constituency details
- Country: India
- Region: Central India
- State: Chhattisgarh
- Assembly constituencies: Jashpur; Kunkuri; Pathalgaon; Lailunga; Raigarh; Sarangarh; Kharsia; Dharamjaigarh
- Established: 1962
- Total electors: 18,38,547
- Reservation: ST

Member of Parliament
- 18th Lok Sabha
- Incumbent Radheshyam Rathiya
- Party: Bharatiya Janata Party
- Elected year: 2024

Raigarh is one of the eleven Lok Sabha (parliamentary) constituencies in Chhattisgarh state in central India.

== Assembly segments ==
Raigarh Lok Sabha constituency is reserved for Scheduled Tribes (ST) candidates. It is composed of the following assembly segments:

#	Name	District	Member	Party	Leading (in 2024)
12	Jashpur (ST)	Jashpur	Raymuni Bhagat	BJP	BJP
13	Kunkuri (ST)	Jashpur	Vishnu Deo Sai	BJP	BJP
14	Pathalgaon (ST)	Jashpur	Gomati Sai	BJP	BJP
15	Lailunga (ST)	Raigarh	Vidyawati Sidar	INC	BJP
16	Raigarh	Raigarh	O. P. Choudhary	BJP	BJP
17	Sarangarh (SC)	Sarangarh	Uttari Ganpat Jangde	INC	BJP
18	Kharsia	Raigarh	Umesh Patel	INC	BJP
19	Dharamjaigarh (ST)	Raigarh	Laljeet Singh Rathia	INC	BJP

== Members of Parliament ==
Year	Member	Party
1962	Vijaya Bhushan Singh Deo	Ram Rajya Parishad
1967	Rajni Devi	Indian National Congress
1971	Ummed Singh Rathia	Indian National Congress
1977	Narhari Prasad Sai	Janata Party
1980	Pushpa Devi Singh	Indian National Congress
1984	Pushpa Devi Singh	Indian National Congress
1989	Nand Kumar Sai	Bharatiya Janata Party
1991	Pushpa Devi Singh	Indian National Congress
1996	Nand Kumar Sai	Bharatiya Janata Party
1998	Ajit Jogi	Indian National Congress
1999	Vishnudeo Sai	Bharatiya Janata Party
2004	Vishnudeo Sai	Bharatiya Janata Party
2009	Vishnudeo Sai	Bharatiya Janata Party
2014	Vishnudeo Sai	Bharatiya Janata Party
2019	Gomtee Sai	Bharatiya Janata Party
2024	Radheshyam Rathiya	Bharatiya Janata Party

== Election results ==
=== 2024 ===
2024 Indian general election: Raigarh
Party	Candidate	Votes	%	±%
BJP	Radheshyam Rathiya	808,275	55.63	
INC	Dr. Menka Devi Singh	5,67,884	39.08	
NOTA	None of the above	15,022	1.03	
Majority		2,40,391	16.55	
Turnout		14,53,542	78.96	▲1.05
BJP hold		Swing		

=== 2019 ===
2019 Indian general elections: Raigarh
Party	Candidate	Votes	%	±%
BJP	Gomtee Sai	658,335	48.76	▼4.40
INC	Laljeet Singh Rathia	5,92,308	43.87	▲8.10
BSP	Innocent Kujur	26,596	1.97	▼0.21
NOTA	None of the Above	15,729	1.17	▼1.12
IND.	Prakash Kumar Uranw	15,729	0.75	▼0.28
Majority		66,027	4.89	▼12.50
Turnout		13,50,741	77.91	▲1.31
BJP hold		Swing		

=== General election 2014 ===
2014 Indian general elections: Raigarh
Party	Candidate	Votes	%	±%
BJP	Vishnu Dev Sai	662,478	53.16	▲5.72
INC	Arti Singh	4,45,728	35.77	▼5.70
NOTA	None of the Above	28,480	2.29	N/A
BSP	Kripa Shankar Bhagat	27,152	2.18	▼1.88
IND.	Prakash Kumar Uranw	12,860	1.03	N/A
Majority		2,16,750	17.39	▲11.42
Turnout		12,46,219	76.60	▲11.29
BJP hold		Swing		

=== General election 2009 ===
2009 Indian general elections: Raigarh
Party	Candidate	Votes	%	±%
BJP	Vishnu Dev Sai	443,948	47.44	
INC	Hridayaram Rathiya	3,88,100	41.47	
BSP	Bahadur Singh Rathia	37,972	4.06	
IND.	Haldhar Ram Sidar	23,361	2.50	
Majority		55,848	5.97	
Turnout		9,35,746	65.31	
BJP hold		Swing		

== See also ==
- Raigarh district
- Rajgarh district is in Madhya Pradesh. Some people get confused since its name sounds similar to 'Raigarh'.
- List of constituencies of the Lok Sabha
