= Shivkumar Dahariya =

Indian politician (born 1964)

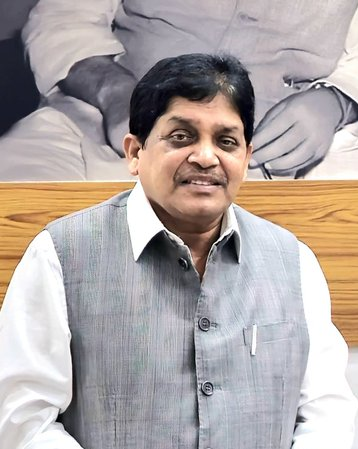
- Dahariya in 2024

Cabinet Minister, Government of Chhattisgarh
- In office 17 December 2018 – 12 December 2023
- Chief Minister: Bhupesh Baghel
- Ministry and Departments: Labour Welfare; Urban Administration and Development

Member of the Chhattisgarh Legislative Assembly
- In office 11 December 2018 – 3 December 2023
- Preceded by: Naveen Markandey
- Succeeded by: Guru Khushwant Saheb
- Constituency: Arang
- In office 8 December 2008 – 8 December 2013
- Preceded by: constituency established
- Succeeded by: Sanam Jangde
- Constituency: Bilaigarh
- In office 2003–2008
- Preceded by: Ramlal Bhardwaj
- Succeeded by: constituency abolished
- Constituency: Palari

Personal details
- Born: 18 December 1964 (age 61)
- Party: Indian National Congress
- Spouse: Sakun Dahariya (m. 1998)
- Children: Ashish Kumar Dahariya (son)

Shivkumar Dahariya (born 18 December 1964) is an Indian politician from Raipur, Chhattisgarh. He served as a Member of the Chhattisgarh Legislative Assembly three times: in 2003 from the Palari, in 2008 from Bilaigarh, and in 2018 from Arang. He also served as a cabinet minister, holding the portfolios of Urban Administration and Development, and Labor Welfare.

== Personal life ==
Dahariya was born on 18 December 1964 in the village of Chhachhanpairi, Abhanpur, Raipur, then in Madhya Pradesh (now in Chhattisgarh). He is the son of Asharam Dahariya. He obtained a Bachelor of Ayurvedic Medicine and Surgery (B.A.M.S.) degree from Government Ayurved College, Raipur (affiliated with Pandit Ravishankar Shukla University) in 1988–1989.

He is married to Shakun Dahariya, with whom he has one son and two daughters. His son, Ashish Kumar Dahariya, represents the Chhattisgarh State Cricket Sangh (CSCS) and the Chhattisgarh team in domestic cricket tournaments, and also plays for the Rajnandgaon Panthers in the Chhattisgarh Cricket Premier League (CCPL). He was also listed in the IPL 2025 auction but went unsold.

== Political career ==
Dahariya's political career began in the student union sphere. He has held various positions at the state level. In 1990, he was jailed for participating in an agitation against the Bharatiya Janata Party (BJP) government in Bhopal, an action directed by Prime Minister Rajiv Gandhi. He was nominated for the Rajya Sabha by the Congress party in 2000 but withdrew his nomination at the instruction of the party high command. He has been a minister in the Chhattisgarh government, overseeing Urban Administration and Development, and Labor.

=== Timeline of political positions ===
Timeline of Shivkumar Dahariya's Political Positions
Year(s)	Political Position/Role
1977-1988	Various positions within school and college student unions
1989	Member, Madhya Pradesh 20-Point Committee
1990	Joint Secretary, Madhya Pradesh Congress Committee (Scheduled Caste and Scheduled Tribe Cell)
1990	Undertook "jail journey" in Bhopal protesting against the BJP government, following instructions from late Prime Minister Rajiv Gandhi
1990-2000	Various capacities at district and state levels within the Congress party, including General Secretary of the Madhya Pradesh Youth Congress
1997	General Secretary, State Youth Congress
March 2000	Withdrew Rajya Sabha nomination as per party high command's instructions
2000	Member, State Transport Authority (with State Minister status), Madhya Pradesh
2001	In-charge General Secretary, Chhattisgarh Pradesh Congress Committee
2003	Elected as Member of the Legislative Assembly (MLA) for the first time (Palari SC constituency)
2004	Member, Scheduled Caste, Scheduled Tribe, and Backward Classes Welfare Committee, Chhattisgarh Legislative Assembly
2004	Member, Committee for Examining Papers Laid on the Table, Chhattisgarh Legislative Assembly
2004	Member, Member Facilities and Honor Committee, Chhattisgarh Legislative Assembly
2004	Member, Questions and References Committee, Chhattisgarh Legislative Assembly
2004	Member, Library Committee, Chhattisgarh Legislative Assembly
2004	Member, Committee on Bills and Resolutions of Non-Government Members, Chhattisgarh Legislative Assembly
2004	Member, Committee on Government Undertakings, Chhattisgarh Legislative Assembly
2004-2005	Member, Committee for Examining Papers Laid on the Table, Chhattisgarh Legislative Assembly
2004-2006	Member, Committee on the Welfare of Scheduled Castes, Scheduled Tribes, and Other Backward Classes, Chhattisgarh Legislative Assembly
2006-2007	Member, Committee on Bills and Resolutions of Non-Government Members, Chhattisgarh Legislative Assembly
2007-2010	Member, Member Facilities and Honor Committee, Chhattisgarh Legislative Assembly
2008	Re-elected as MLA for a second term (Bilaigarh SC constituency)
2009	Member, Member Facilities and Honor Committee, Chhattisgarh Legislative Assembly
2010	Member, Questions and References Committee, Chhattisgarh Legislative Assembly
2010-2011	Member, Privileges Committee, Chhattisgarh Legislative Assembly
2010-2011	Member, Questions and References Committee, Chhattisgarh Legislative Assembly
2011	Member, Committee on Government Undertakings, Chhattisgarh Legislative Assembly
2011	Member, Committee on the Welfare of Scheduled Castes, Scheduled Tribes, and Backward Classes, Chhattisgarh Legislative Assembly
2011-2012	Member, Committee on Government Undertakings, Chhattisgarh Legislative Assembly
2011-2012	Member, Committee on the Welfare of Scheduled Castes, Scheduled Tribes, and Other Backward Classes, Chhattisgarh Legislative Assembly
2012-2013	Member, Public Accounts Committee, Chhattisgarh Legislative Assembly
2012-2013	Member, Committee on Government Assurances, Chhattisgarh Legislative Assembly
2013-2014	Member, Committee on the Welfare of Scheduled Castes, Scheduled Tribes, and Other Backward Classes, Chhattisgarh Legislative Assembly
2013-2014	Member, Committee on Government Assurances, Chhattisgarh Legislative Assembly
2018	Elected as MLA for a third term (Arang SC constituency)
2019	Appointed Minister in the Government of Chhattisgarh (Urban Administration and Development, and Labor portfolios)
2019-2021	Member, Business Advisory Committee, Chhattisgarh Legislative Assembly
November 2020	Announced policy decisions to empower Mayor-in-Council (MiC) regarding construction work location changes and utilization of saved funds
March 2021	Inspected infrastructural works in Arang Vidhan Sabha constituency, including sanitation, road construction, community buildings, lighting, and gyms
November 2022	Addressed Chhattisgarh Business Summit 2022 as Minister of Urban Administration & Development and Labor Department, promoting investment in the state
2023	Runner-up in the Chhattisgarh Legislative Assembly Election (Arang SC constituency)
2024	1st Runner Up in the Lok Sabha Election (Janjgir-Champa SC constituency)

=== Electoral performance ===
Year	Election Type	Constituency	Party	Votes Secured	Percentage (%)	Outcome	Winner/1st Runner-up	Party	Votes	Percentage (%)	Ref(s)
2003	Vidhan Sabha	Palari (SC)	INC	40,814	38.55	Won	Durga Prasad Maheshwar	BJP	38,112	36.00	
2008	Vidhan Sabha	Bilaigarh (SC)	INC	55,863	37.97	Won	Dr. Sanam Jangde	BJP	42,241	28.71	
2013	Vidhan Sabha	Bilaigarh (SC)	INC	58,669	32.28	Lost (Runner-Up)	Dr. Sanam Jangde	BJP	71,364	39.26	
2018	Vidhan Sabha	Arang (SC)	INC	69,900	45.10	Won	Sanjay Dhidhi	BJP	44,823	28.92	
2023	Vidhan Sabha	Arang (SC)	INC	77,501	43.34	Lost (Runner-Up)	Guru Khushwant Saheb	BJP	94,039	52.59	
2024	Lok Sabha	Janjgir-Champa (SC)	INC	618,199	44.40	Lost (Runner-Up)	Kamlesh Jangde	BJP	678,199	48.71	

== See also ==
- Baghel ministry
- 5th Chhattisgarh Assembly
