= Gomati Sai =

Indian politician (25 May 1975)

Gomtee Sai

Member of the Chhattisgarh Legislative Assembly
- Incumbent
- Assumed office 3 December 2023
- Preceded by: Ram Pukar Singh Thakur
- Constituency: Pathalgaon

Member of Parliament, Lok Sabha
- In office 2019 – 6 December 2023
- Preceded by: Vishnu Dev Sai
- Succeeded by: Radheshyam Rathiya
- Constituency: Raigarh

Personal details
- Born: 25 May 1978 (age 48) Kokiakhar, Jashpur district, Madhya Pradesh
- Party: Bharatiya Janata Party
- Spouse: Niranjan Sai (m. 1991)
- Parents: Shubh Saran Singh (father); Basanti Bai (mother)

Gomati Sai (25 May 1975) is an Indian politician from Chhattisgarh. She served as an MP from Raigarh and later was elected as an MLA from Patholgaon Assembly constituency, which is reserved for Scheduled Tribe community in Jashpur District.

== Early life and education ==
Sai is from Kunkuri, Jashpur District, Chhattisgarh. She is born to Shubh Saran Singh and Basanti Bai. She married Niranjan Sai in 1991. She passed Class 12 through open school stream from Chhattisgarh State Open School, Raipur.

== Career ==
She was elected to the Lok Sabha, lower house of the Parliament of India from Raigarh, Chhattisgarh in the 2019 Indian general election as member of the Bharatiya Janata Party.
