= Vidyawati Sidar =

Indian politician

Vidyawati Sidar (born 1983) is an Indian politician from Chhattisgarh. She is an MLA from Lailunga Assembly constituency, which is reserved for Scheduled Tribe community, in Raigarh district. She won the 2023 Chhattisgarh Legislative Assembly election representing the Indian National Congress.

== Early life and education ==
Sidar is from Lailunga, Raigarh district, Chhattisgarh. She married Kunjbihari Sidar. She passed Class 12 in 2001 and later discontinued her studies.

== Career ==
Sidar won from Lailunga Assembly constituency representing Indian National Congress in the 2023 Chhattisgarh Legislative Assembly election. She polled 84,666 votes and defeated her nearest rival, Suniti Satyanand Rathiya of Bharatiya Janata Party, by a margin of 4,176 votes.
