= Jagmohan Das =

Indian politician

Jagmohan Das was an Indian politician from the state of the Madhya Pradesh. He represented Arang Vidhan Sabha constituency of undivided Madhya Pradesh Legislative Assembly by winning General election of 1957 and 1962.
