= Pathalgaon Assembly constituency =

Legislative Assembly constituency in Chhattisgarh State, India

Coordinates: 22.56°N 83.46°E

Pathalgaon
- Constituency No. 14 for the Chhattisgarh Legislative Assembly

Constituency details
- Country: India
- Region: Central India
- State: Chhattisgarh
- District: Jashpur
- Lok Sabha constituency: Raigarh
- Established: 1961
- Total electors: 226,859
- Reservation: ST

Member of Legislative Assembly
- 6th Chhattisgarh Legislative Assembly
- Incumbent Gomati Sai
- Party: Bharatiya Janata Party
- Elected year: 2023

Pathalgaon is one of the 90 Legislative Assembly constituencies of Chhattisgarh state in India.

It is part of Jashpur district and is reserved for candidates belonging to the Scheduled Tribes.

== Members of the Legislative Assembly ==
Year	Member	Party
Madhya Pradesh Legislative Assembly
1962	Laljit Singh	Akhil Bharatiya Ram Rajya Parishad
1967	U. Singh	Indian National Congress
1972	Laljit Singh	Bharatiya Jana Sangh
1977	Ram Pukar Singh Thakur	Indian National Congress
1980	Ram Pukar Singh Thakur	Indian National Congress
1985	Ram Pukar Singh Thakur	Indian National Congress
1990	Laljit Singh	Bharatiya Janata Party
1993	Ram Pukar Singh Thakur	Indian National Congress
1998	Ram Pukar Singh Thakur	Indian National Congress
Chhattisgarh Legislative Assembly
2003	Ram Pukar Singh Thakur	Indian National Congress
2008	Ram Pukar Singh Thakur	Indian National Congress
2013	Shivshankar Painkra	Bharatiya Janata Party
2018	Ram Pukar Singh Thakur	Indian National Congress
2023	Gomati Sai	Bharatiya Janata Party

== Election results ==
=== 2023 ===
2023 Chhattisgarh Legislative Assembly election: Pathalgaon
Party	Candidate	Votes	%	±%
BJP	Gomati Sai	82,320	45.87	▲11.31
INC	Rampukar Singh Thakur	82,065	45.72	▼10
AAP	Raja Ram Lakra	3,675	2.05	▲1.56
NOTA	None of the Above	3,131	1.74	▲1.24
Majority		255	0.15	▼21.01
Turnout		1,79,480		
BJP gain from INC		Swing		

=== 2018 ===
Chhattisgarh Legislative Assembly Election, 2018: Pathalgaon
Party	Candidate	Votes	%	±%
INC	Rampukar Singh Thakur	96,599	55.72	
BJP	Shivshankar Painkra	59,913	34.56	
JCC	M. S. Painkara	3,915	2.26	
Independent	Yagya Kumar Bhagat	3,915	2.26	
NOTA	None of the Above	5,159	2.98	
Majority		36,686		
Turnout		1,73,359	80.54	
INC gain from BJP		Swing		

=== 2013 ===
Chhattisgarh Legislative Assembly Election, 2013: Pathalgaon
Party	Candidate	Votes	%	±%
BJP	Shivshankar Painkra	71,485	44.64	
INC	Rampukar Singh Thakur	67,576	42.20	
NOTA	None of the Above	5,533	3.45	
Majority		3,909	2.44	
Turnout		1,60,150	81.33	
BJP gain from INC		Swing		

== See also ==
- List of constituencies of the Chhattisgarh Legislative Assembly
- Jashpur district
