= Dineshbhai Makwana =

Indian politician

Dineshbhai Makwana is an Indian politician and the elected candidate for Lok Sabha from Ahmedabad West Lok Sabha constituency. He is a member of the Bharatiya Janata Party.

== See also ==
- 18th Lok Sabha
