= Arang Assembly constituency =

Legislative Assembly constituency in Chhattisgarh State, India

Coordinates: 21.2°N 81.96°E

Arang
- Constituency No. 52 for the Chhattisgarh Legislative Assembly

Constituency details
- Country: India
- Region: Central India
- State: Chhattisgarh
- District: Raipur
- Lok Sabha constituency: Raipur
- Established: 1952
- Total electors: 231,375
- Reservation: SC

Member of Legislative Assembly
- 6th Chhattisgarh Legislative Assembly
- Incumbent Guru Khushwant Saheb
- Party: Bharatiya Janata Party
- Elected year: 2023
- Preceded by: Shivkumar Dahariya

Arang is one of the 90 Legislative Assembly constituencies of Chhattisgarh state in India.

It is part of Raipur district and is reserved for candidates belonging to the Scheduled Castes.

In 2008 delimitation, Mandirhasod Assembly constituency was merged into Arang. Currently most of the Naya Raipur comes under Arang constituency.

== Members of the Legislative Assembly ==
Year	Member	Party
Madhya Pradesh Legislative Assembly
1952 (Note: as Arang-Kharora Assembly Constituency)	Sukhchain Das	Indian National Congress
1952	Lakhanlal Gupta	Indian National Congress
1957	Lakhanlal Gupta	Indian National Congress
1957	Jagmohan Das	Indian National Congress
1962	Jagmohan Das	Indian National Congress
1967	Kanhaiyalal Kosariya	Indian National Congress
1972	Kanhaiyalal Kosariya	Indian National Congress
1977	Ratandas Hardas	Janata Party
1980	Vijay Kumar Guru	Indian National Congress
1985	Vijay Kumar Guru	Indian National Congress
1990	Gangu Ram Baghel	Bharatiya Janata Party
1993	Gangu Ram Baghel	Bharatiya Janata Party
1998	Gangu Ram Baghel	Indian National Congress
Chhattisgarh Legislative Assembly
2003	Sanjay Dhidhi	Bharatiya Janata Party
2008	Guru Rudra Kumar	Indian National Congress
2013	Naveen Markandey	Bharatiya Janata Party
2018	Dr. Shivkumar Dahariya	Indian National Congress
2023	Guru Khushwant Saheb	Bharatiya Janata Party

== Election results ==
=== Assembly Election 2023 ===
2023 Chhattisgarh Legislative Assembly election : Arang
Party	Candidate	Votes	%	±%
BJP	Guru Khushwant Saheb	94,039	53.26%	▲24.09
INC	Dr. Shivkumar Dahariya	77,501	43.89%	▼1.60
NOTA	None of the Above	2,255	1.28%	▲0.42
BSP	Santosh Markandey (Advocate)	1,397	0.79%	New
AAP	Parmanand Jangade	1,394	0.79%	▼0.14
Margin of victory		16,538	9.37%	▼6.95
Turnout		1,76,567	77.34%	▲0.22
Registered electors		2,31,375		▲14.58
BJP gain from INC		Swing	▲7.77	

=== Assembly Election 2018 ===
2018 Chhattisgarh Legislative Assembly election : Arang
Party	Candidate	Votes	%	±%
INC	Dr. Shivkumar Dahariya	69,900	45.49%	▲11.57
BJP	Sanjay Dhidhi	44,823	29.17%	▼15.07
JCC	Sanjay Chelak	27,903	18.16%	New
Independent	Sharda Banjare	3,042	1.98%	New
Independent	Narayan Prasad Tandan	1,528	0.99%	New
AAP	Dageshvar Bharti M	1,423	0.93%	New
NOTA	None of the Above	1,321	0.86%	▼1.83
Margin of victory		25,077	16.32%	▲6.00
Turnout		1,53,657	76.83%	▲0.37
Registered electors		2,01,938		▲14.53
INC gain from BJP		Swing	▲1.25	

=== Assembly Election 2013 ===
2013 Chhattisgarh Legislative Assembly election : Arang
Party	Candidate	Votes	%	±%
BJP	Naveen Markandey	59,067	44.24%	▲13.68
INC	Rudra Kumar Guru	45,293	33.93%	▲2.14
Chattisgarh Swabhiman Manch	Ganguram Baghel	13,004	9.74%	New
Independent	Pappu Kosre	6,769	5.07%	New
BSP	K.D. Tandan	3,639	2.73%	▼3.05
NOTA	None of the Above	3,588	2.69%	New
Independent	Shrimati Meera Tandan	1,962	1.47%	New
Independent	Brijesh Pal Tandan	1,366	1.02%	New
Margin of victory		13,774	10.32%	▲9.09
Turnout		1,33,506	77.79%	▲8.74
Registered electors		1,76,321		▲8.34
BJP gain from INC		Swing	▲12.45	

=== Assembly Election 2008 ===
2008 Chhattisgarh Legislative Assembly election : Arang
Party	Candidate	Votes	%	±%
INC	Guru Rudra Kumar	34,655	31.79%	▲0.65
BJP	Sanjay Dhidhi	33,318	30.56%	▼19.65
Independent	Ganguram Baghel	29,089	26.68%	New
BSP	Adv. Sadanand	6,291	5.77%	▼2.25
GGP	Dr. Ramesh Panthi	1,269	1.16%	New
JMM	Amrit Lal Joshi	1,143	1.05%	New
Independent	Orprakash (Umariyawale)	979	0.90%	New
Margin of victory		1,337	1.23%	▼17.85
Turnout		1,09,012	66.98%	▼7.87
Registered electors		1,62,754		▲25.97
INC gain from BJP		Swing	▼18.42	

=== Assembly Election 2003 ===
2003 Chhattisgarh Legislative Assembly election : Arang
Party	Candidate	Votes	%	±%
BJP	Sanjay Dhidhi	48,556	50.21%	New
INC	Ganguram Baghel	30,112	31.14%	New
BSP	Dr. Kunti Kurre	7,757	8.02%	New
NCP	Chait Ram Tandan	4,352	4.50%	New
Independent	Sarhu Tandan	1,836	1.90%	New
Chhattisgarhi Samaj Party	Ramnath	1,280	1.32%	New
Independent	Bishat Kurre	1,115	1.15%	New
Margin of victory		18,444	19.07%	
Turnout		96,706	74.85%	
Registered electors		1,29,199		
BJP win (new seat)				

== See also ==
- List of constituencies of the Chhattisgarh Legislative Assembly
- Raipur district
