= Raymuni Bhagat =

Indian politician

Member of the Chhattisgarh Legislative Assembly
- Incumbent
- Assumed office 2023
- Preceded by: Vinay Kumar Bhagat
- Constituency: Jashpur Assembly constituency

Raymuni Bhagat is an Indian politician from the Bharatiya Janata Party. In the 2023 Chhattisgarh Legislative Assembly election, she was elected from the Jashpur Assembly constituency.

In October 2024, local Christians formed a human chain in protest of remarks she allegedly made.

== See also ==
- 6th Chhattisgarh Assembly
