= Jashpur Assembly constituency =

Legislative Assembly constituency in Chhattisgarh State, India

Coordinates: 22.56°N 83.49°E

Jashpur
- Constituency No. 12 for the Chhattisgarh Legislative Assembly

Constituency details
- Country: India
- Region: Central India
- State: Chhattisgarh
- District: Jashpur
- Lok Sabha constituency: Raigarh
- Established: 1951
- Total electors: 237,786
- Reservation: ST

Member of Legislative Assembly
- 6th Chhattisgarh Legislative Assembly
- Incumbent Raymuni Bhagat
- Party: Bharatiya Janata Party
- Elected year: 2023
- Preceded by: Vinay Kumar Bhagat

Jashpur is one of the 90 Legislative Assembly constituencies of Chhattisgarh state in India.

It is part of Jashpur district and is reserved for candidates of the Scheduled Tribes. As of 2024, its representative is Raymuni Bhagat of the Bharatiya Janata Party.

== Members of the Legislative Assembly ==
Year	Member	Party
Madhya Pradesh Legislative Assembly
1952	Johan	Kisan Mazdoor Praja Party
1957	Vijay Bhushan Singh Deo	Indian National Congress
1962	Shakuntala Devi	Ram Rajya Parishad
1967	Johan	Indian National Congress
1972	Luis Bega	Indian National Congress
1977	Sukh Ram	Janata Party
1980	Luis Bega	Indian National Congress
1985	Ganesh Ram Bhagat	Bharatiya Janata Party
1990	Ganesh Ram Bhagat	Bharatiya Janata Party
1993	Ganesh Ram Bhagat	Bharatiya Janata Party
1998	Vikram Bhagat	Bharatiya Janata Party
Chhattisgarh Legislative Assembly
2003	Raj Sharan Bhagat	Bharatiya Janata Party
2008	Jageswar Ram Bhagat	Bharatiya Janata Party
2013	Raj Sharan Bhagat	Bharatiya Janata Party
2018	Vinay Kumar Bhagat	Indian National Congress
2023	Raymuni Bhagat	Bharatiya Janata Party

== Election results ==
=== 2023 ===
Chhattisgarh Legislative Assembly Election, 2023: Jashpur
Party	Candidate	Votes	%	±%
BJP	Raymuni Bhagat	89,103	49.21	+11.68
INC	Vinay Kumar Bhagat	71,458	39.47	−2.77
Independent	Pradeep Xess	7,571	4.18	New
AAP	Prakash Toppo	2,755	1.57	+0.23
NOTA	None of the Above	3,324	1.84	−2.53
Majority		17,645	9.74	+5.03
Turnout		181,056	76.14	−0.57
BJP gain from INC		Swing		

=== 2018 ===
2018 Chhattisgarh Legislative Assembly election: Jashpur
Party	Candidate	Votes	%	±%
INC	Vinay Kumar Bhagat	71,963	42.24	
BJP	Govind Ram Bhagat	63,937	37.53	
Independent	Pradeep Singh	10,646	6.25	
Independent	Nand Ram Bharadwaj	4,784	2.81	
SP	Kripa Shankar Bhagat	2,551	1.50	
Independent	Vishnu Ram	2,394	1.41	
AAP	Rohit Lakra	2,281	1.34	
BSP	Gaganmati Bhagat	2,081	1.22	
RPI(A)	Emmanuel Kerketta	1,886	1.11	
NOTA	None of the Above	4,317	2.53	
Majority		8,026	4.71	
Turnout		1,70,378	76.71	
INC gain from BJP		Swing		

== See also ==
- List of constituencies of the Chhattisgarh Legislative Assembly
- Jashpur district
