= Sarangarh Assembly constituency =

Legislative Assembly constituency in Chhattisgarh State, India

Coordinates: 21.59°N 83.08°E

Sarangarh
- Constituency No. 17 for the Chhattisgarh Legislative Assembly

Constituency details
- Country: India
- Region: Central India
- State: Chhattisgarh
- District: Sarangarh-Bilaigarh
- Lok Sabha constituency: Raigarh
- Established: 1951
- Total electors: 263,526
- Reservation: SC

Member of Legislative Assembly
- 6th Chhattisgarh Legislative Assembly
- Incumbent Uttari Ganpat Jangde
- Party: Indian National Congress
- Elected year: 2023
- Preceded by: Kera Bai Manhar

Sarangarh is one of the 90 Legislative Assembly constituencies of Chhattisgarh state in India.

It is part of Raigarh district and is reserved for candidates belonging to the Scheduled Castes.

== Members of the Legislative Assembly ==
Year	Member	Party
Madhya Pradesh Legislative Assembly
1952 (Note: 2 membered seat)	Vedram	Indian National Congress
1952	Raja Nareshchandra Singh	Indian National Congress
1957	Raja Nareshchandra Singh	Indian National Congress
1957	Nanhu Dai	Indian National Congress
1962	Nanhu Dai	Indian National Congress
1967	Kunjram	Indian National Congress
1972	Sheo Prasad Gotia	Indian National Congress
1977	Hulasram Manhar	Indian National Congress
1980	Hulasram Manhar	Indian National Congress (I)
1985	Puriram Chauhan	Independent
1990	Bhaiya Ram Khunte	Indian National Congress
1993	Shamsher Singh	Bharatiya Janata Party
1998	Dr. Chhabilal Ratre	Bahujan Samaj Party
Chhattisgarh Legislative Assembly
2003	Kamda Jolhe	Bahujan Samaj Party
2008	Padma Manhar	Indian National Congress
2013	Kera Bai Manhar	Bharatiya Janata Party
2018	Uttari Ganpat Jangde	Indian National Congress
2023	Uttari Ganpat Jangde	Indian National Congress

== Election results ==
=== 2023 ===
Chhattisgarh Legislative Assembly Election, 2023: Sarangarh
Party	Candidate	Votes	%	±%
INC	Uttari Ganpat Jangde	109,484	52.15	−0.34
BJP	Shivkumari Saradhan Chouhan	79,789	38.01	+12.53
BSP	Narayan Ratnakar	13,215	6.30	−9.72
NOTA	None of the Above	2,287	1.09	−0.12
Majority		29,695	14.14	−12.87
Turnout		209,926	79.66	−0.20
INC hold		Swing		

=== 2018 ===
Chhattisgarh Legislative Assembly Election, 2018: Sarangarh
Party	Candidate	Votes	%	±%
INC	Uttari Ganpat Jangde	101,843	52.49	
BJP	Kera Bai Manhar	49,445	25.48	
BSP	ARVIND KHATKER	31,083	16.02	
NOTA	None of the Above	2,342	1.21	
Majority		52,398	27.01	
Turnout		1,94,024	79.86	
INC gain from BJP		Swing		

== See also ==
- List of constituencies of the Chhattisgarh Legislative Assembly
- Sarangarh-Bilaigarh district
