= Uttari Ganpat Jangde =

Indian politician

Member of the Chhattisgarh Legislative Assembly
- Incumbent
- Assumed office 2018
- Preceded by: Kera Bai Manhar
- Constituency: Sarangarh

Personal details
- Born: 30 June 1985 (age 40)
- Party: Indian National Congress
- Profession: Politician

Uttari Ganpat Jangde (born 30 June 1985) is an Indian politician from Chhattisgarh. She won as an MLA from Sarangarh Assembly constituency in Sarangarh Bilaigarh District in the 2018 Chhattisgarh Legislative Assembly election representing the Indian National Congress.

== Early life and education ==
Jangde is from Sarangarh, Sarangarh Bilaigarh District, Chhattisgarh. She is the daughter of Ganpat Jangre. She passed Class 12 from Chhattisgarh State Open School, Raipur in 2020.

== Career ==
Jangde won from Sarangarh Assembly constituency in the then Rajgarh district representing Indian National Congress in the 2018 Chhattisgarh Legislative Assembly election. She polled 101,834 votes and defeated her nearest rival, Kera Bai Manahar of Bharatiya Janata Party by a margin of 52,389 votes.
