= Santosh Pandey (Chhattisgarh politician) =

Member of the Lok Sabha

Member of Parliament, Lok Sabha
- Incumbent
- Assumed office 23 May 2019
- Preceded by: Abhishek Singh
- Constituency: Rajnandgaon

Personal details
- Born: 31 December 1967 (age 58) Sahaspur, Chhattisgarh, India
- Party: Bharatiya Janata Party
- Profession: Lawyer

Santosh Pandey (born 31 December 1967) is an Indian politician from the Bharatiya Janata Party And serves as the Member of Parliament, Lok Sabha from Rajnandgaon, Chhattisgarh.
