= Lailunga Assembly constituency =

Legislative Assembly constituency in Chhattisgarh State, India

Coordinates: 22.4°N 83.57°E

Lailunga
- Constituency No. 15 for the Chhattisgarh Legislative Assembly

Constituency details
- Country: India
- Region: Central India
- State: Chhattisgarh
- District: Raigarh
- Lok Sabha constituency: Raigarh
- Established: 2008
- Total electors: 204,520
- Reservation: ST

Member of Legislative Assembly
- 6th Chhattisgarh Legislative Assembly
- Incumbent Vidyawati Sidar
- Party: Indian National Congress
- Elected year: 2023
- Preceded by: Chakradhar Singh Sidar

Lailunga is one of the 90 Legislative Assembly constituencies of Chhattisgarh state in India.

It is part of Raigarh district and is reserved for candidates belonging to the Scheduled Tribes. The current MLA is Vidayawati Sidar from the Congress party.

== Members of the Legislative Assembly ==
Year	Member	Party
Until 2008: Constituency did not exist
2008	Hriday Ram Rathiya	Indian National Congress
2013	Suniti Satyanand Rathiya	Bharatiya Janata Party
2018	Chakradhar Singh Sidar	Indian National Congress
2023	Vidyawati Sidar	Indian National Congress

== Election results ==
=== 2023 ===
Chhattisgarh Legislative Assembly Election, 2023: Lailunga
Party	Candidate	Votes	%	±%
INC	Vidyawati Sidar	84,666	48.20	+13.11
BJP	Suniti Satyanand Rathiya	80,490	45.82	−4.26
GGP	Raghuveer Rathiya	2,186	1.24	New
NOTA	None of the Above	2328	1.33	−2.53
Majority		4,176	2.38	−12.62
Turnout		164,980	81.81	−3.11
INC hold		Swing		

=== 2018 ===
Chhattisgarh Legislative Assembly Election, 2018: Lailunga
Party	Candidate	Votes	%	±%
INC	Chakradhar Singh Sidar	81,770	50.08	
BJP	Satyanand Rathiya	57,287	35.09	
JCC	Hridaya Ram Rathiya	12,195	7.47	
NOTA	None of the Above	4,092	2.51	
Majority		24,483	15.00	
Turnout		1,63,266	84.92	
INC gain from BJP		Swing		

== See also ==
- List of constituencies of the Chhattisgarh Legislative Assembly
- Raigarh district
