= Radheshyam Rathiya =

Indian politician (born 1972)

Member of Parliament, Lok Sabha
- Incumbent
- Assumed office 4 June 2024
- Preceded by: Gomtee Sai
- Constituency: Raigarh

Personal details
- Born: 12 May 1972 (age 53)
- Party: Bharatiya Janata Party
- Spouse: Nindravati Rathiya
- Parent(s): Lila Ram Rathiya (father); Til Kunwar (mother)
- Occupation: Politician

Radheshyam Rathiya (born 12 May 1972) is an Indian politician. He has been elected to Lok Sabha from Raigarh Lok Sabha constituency. He is a member of Bharatiya Janta Party.
