= Kamlesh Jangde =

Member of the Lok Sabha

Member of Parliament, Lok Sabha
- Incumbent
- Assumed office 4 June 2024
- Preceded by: Guharam Ajgalle
- Constituency: Janjgir-Champa

Personal details
- Born: 30 December 1977 (age 48) Padampur (Mungeli), Chhattisgarh
- Party: Bharatiya Janata Party
- Spouse: Basant Kumar Jangde
- Parent: Bhuredas Patre
- Education: M. A. from Literature

Kamlesh Jangde (born 30 December 1977) is an Indian politician serving as a Member of Parliament from Janjgir-Champa from Bharatiya Janata Party. She has also served as a member of ABVP and District President of Surguja of BJP Mahila Morcha from 2015 to 2020.
