= Kishori Lal =

Kishori Lal may refer to:

- Pandit Kishori Lal, 1912–1990, Indian freedom fighter
- Kishori Lal (Baijnath politician)
- Kishori Lal (Kullu politician)
- Kishori Lal (UP politician), member of Lok Sabha from Amethi constituency
