= Results of the 2024 Indian general election =

The results of India's general elections to constitute 18th Lok Sabha, held in April–June 2024 were announced on 4 and 5 June 2024. The main contenders were two alliance groups of the Incumbent National Democratic Alliance (N.D.A) led by Bharatiya Janata Party; and the Opposition Indian National Developmental Inclusive Alliance (I.N.D.I.A) led by Indian National Congress. In the legislative house of 543 seats, the incumbent NDA Alliance secured majority with 293 seats, which included BJP party's 240 seats, while the opposition INDIA Alliance got 234 seats, including the Congress party's 99 seats. On June 9, 2024, Narendra Modi took oath as Prime Minister, having been elected the leader of the NDA alliance, though BJP lost its majority.

This article describes the performance of various political parties. For the performance of individual candidates, please see, List of members of the 18th Lok Sabha.

Seat share of parties in the election
1. BJP (44.2%)
2. INC (18.2%)
3. SP (6.82%)
4. AITC (5.35%)
5. DMK (4.06%)
6. TDP (3.21%)
7. JD(U) (2.95%)
8. SS(UBT) (1.66%)
9. NCP(SP) (1.48%)
10. SS (1.29%)
11. Other (10.7%)
Vote share of parties in the election
1. BJP (36.9%)
2. INC (21.4%)
3. SP (4.62%)
4. AITC (4.41%)
5. YSRCP (2.09%)
6. BSP (2.06%)
7. TDP (1.99%)
8. DMK (1.84%)
9. CPI(M) (1.77%)
10. RJD (1.58%)
11. SS (UBT) (1.50%)
12. BJD (1.48%)
13. AIADMK (1.40%)
14. JD(U) (1.25%)
15. SS (1.16%)
16. Other (14.5%)

== Overview ==
The BJP-led NDA surpassed the majority threshold of 272 and won 293 seats. However, unlike the previous election, the BJP did not win a majority in both houses of parliament having only won 240 seats (losing 63 seats from the 303 seats they previously held since 2019 as well as losing their 10-year long benefit of being the sole-controller of both houses of parliament since 2014) in the Lok Sabha. However, Narendra Modi became the second Indian prime minister to be re-elected for a third consecutive term, since Jawaharlal Nehru's re-election in 1962, the third Indian prime minister to be able to rule for more than 10 years after Nehru (15 years) & Indira Gandhi (14 years) & the second BJP leader after Atal Bihari Vajpayee to be able to lead the party into becoming the single largest party in the Lok Sabha thrice.

The INC-led INDIA alliance gained 234 seats out of which 99 were won by the Congress Party. 37 seats were won by the SP while 29 seats from West Bengal were won by the Mamata Banerjee-led Trinamool Congress. The final wins by the alliance were stronger than previous predictions from exit polls.

The BJP lost 63 seats while its two main partners, the TDP and the JD(U), gained 13 seats and lost 4, respectively. Within the opposition alliance, the Congress party gained 47 seats, the SP gained 32 seats, and the Trinamool Congress gained 7 seats. Uttar Pradesh, West Bengal and Maharashtra had earlier indications of an overwhelming BJP and allies victory but ultimately were won by the opposition with the SP winning in UP, the Trinamool Congress in Bengal and the SS-UBT, the Congress Party and the NCP-SP winning Maharashtra.

According to Reuters, a key reason for BJP losing its majority in 2024 was the narrative by the Opposition parties that BJP's target of obtaining more than 400 seats was aimed to bring about sweeping amendments to the Constitution involving removal of Gandhian ideals as the guiding principles of the government & replacing them with its Hindutva narrative, the most notable among the proposed changes being altering the reservation quotas, based on the remarks by some prominent BJP leaders.

According to the national data from the Centre for the Study of Developing Societies (CSDS) – Lokniti National Election Studies published in The Hindu, the National Democratic Alliance (NDA) maintained a 3 percentage point lead in the overall national vote share (43% to 40%) over the INDIA alliance. The NDA maintained its strongest age advantage among young voters aged 18–25, capturing 46% of their vote compared to 33% for the INDIA bloc, The INDIA alliance performed best among non-literate voters, leading the NDA by 42% to 38%, whereas the NDA's support scaled up with higher education and economic affluence, peaking at 45% among graduates and 46% among the wealthiest class. Geographically, the spatial divide showed the NDA dominating large metropolitan cities and urban zones with a 45% vote share, but while the NDA bloc surged into a lead in small, semi-urban towns (42% to 41%), rural villages remained highly competitive with the NDA retaining a narrow 42% to 41% edge overall. In terms of communities, the NDA maintained a massive upper-caste Hindu anchor (61%) and held comfortable margins among Other Backward Classes (OBCs), while Scheduled Castes (Dalits) tied perfectly at 31% for both coalitions. Religious minorities, especially the Muslims heavily consolidated behind the opposition, with 65% of Muslims voting for the INDIA alliance,

== Results by party and alliances ==
Party/alliance		Votes	%	Seats
NDA	Bharatiya Janata Party	235,974,144	36.56	240
NDA	Telugu Desam Party	12,775,270	1.98	16
NDA	Janata Dal (United)	8,039,663	1.25	12
NDA	Shiv Sena	7,401,447	1.15	7
NDA	Lok Janshakti Party (Ram Vilas)	2,810,250	0.44	5
NDA	Janata Dal (Secular)	2,173,701	0.34	2
NDA	Nationalist Congress Party	2,059,179	0.32	1
NDA	Pattali Makkal Katchi	1,879,689	0.29	0
NDA	Jana Sena Party	1,454,138	0.23	2
NDA	Asom Gana Parishad	1,298,707	0.20	1
NDA	Rashtriya Lok Dal	893,460	0.14	2
NDA	Apna Dal (Soneylal)	808,245	0.13	1
NDA	Bharath Dharma Jana Sena	505,753	0.08	0
NDA	Hindustani Awam Morcha	494,960	0.08	1
NDA	United People's Party Liberal	488,995	0.08	1
NDA	Rashtriya Samaj Paksha	521,746	0.08	0
NDA	All Jharkhand Students Union	458,677	0.07	1
NDA	National People's Party	417,930	0.06	0
NDA	Tamil Maanila Congress	410,401	0.06	0
NDA	Amma Makkal Munnettra Kazhagam	393,415	0.06	0
NDA	Nationalist Democratic Progressive Party	350,967	0.05	0
NDA	Suheldev Bharatiya Samaj Party	340,188	0.05	0
NDA	Naga People's Front	299,536	0.05	0
NDA	Rashtriya Lok Morcha	253,876	0.04	0
NDA	Sikkim Krantikari Morcha	164,396	0.03	1
NDA	Total	282,668,733	43.80	293
INDIA	Indian National Congress	136,758,952	21.19	99
INDIA	Samajwadi Party	29,549,389	4.58	37
INDIA	All India Trinamool Congress	28,213,393	4.37	29
INDIA	Dravida Munnetra Kazhagam	11,754,710	1.82	22
INDIA	Communist Party of India (Marxist)	11,342,553	1.76	4
INDIA	Rashtriya Janata Dal	10,107,402	1.57	4
INDIA	Shiv Sena (Uddhav Balasaheb Thackeray)	9,567,779	1.48	9
INDIA	Aam Aadmi Party	7,147,800	1.11	3
INDIA	Nationalist Congress Party – Sharadchandra Pawar	5,921,162	0.92	8
INDIA	Communist Party of India	3,157,184	0.49	2
INDIA	Jharkhand Mukti Morcha	2,652,955	0.41	3
INDIA	Indian Union Muslim League	1,716,186	0.27	3
INDIA	Communist Party of India (Marxist–Leninist) Liberation	1,736,761	0.27	2
INDIA	Bharat Adivasi Party	1,257,056	0.19	1
INDIA	Vikassheel Insaan Party	1,187,455	0.18	0
INDIA	Jammu and Kashmir National Conference	1,147,041	0.18	2
INDIA	Viduthalai Chiruthaigal Katchi	990,237	0.15	2
INDIA	Rashtriya Loktantrik Party	596,955	0.09	1
INDIA	Revolutionary Socialist Party	587,363	0.09	1
INDIA	Marumalarchi Dravida Munnetra Kazhagam	542,213	0.08	1
INDIA	Jammu and Kashmir Peoples Democratic Party	435,980	0.07	0
INDIA	Assam Jatiya Parishad	414,441	0.06	0
INDIA	Kerala Congress	364,631	0.06	1
INDIA	All India Forward Bloc	284,269	0.04	0
INDIA	Kerala Congress (Mani)	277,365	0.04	0
INDIA	Total	267,711,232	41.48	234
YSR Congress Party		13,316,134	2.06	4
Bahujan Samaj Party		13,153,830	2.04	0
Biju Janata Dal		9,412,674	1.46	0
All India Anna Dravida Munnetra Kazhagam		8,952,587	1.39	0
Bharat Rashtra Samithi		3,657,237	0.57	0
Naam Tamilar Katchi		3,600,088	0.56	0
Shiromani Akali Dal		1,814,318	0.28	1
Vanchit Bahujan Aaghadi		1,582,855	0.25	0
All India Majlis-e-Ittehadul Muslimeen		1,400,215	0.22	1
Desiya Murpokku Dravida Kazhagam		1,128,616	0.17	0
Bodoland People's Front		777,570	0.12	0
Aazad Samaj Party (Kanshi Ram)		691,820	0.11	1
Indian Secular Front		650,229	0.10	0
All India United Democratic Front		625,954	0.10	0
Voice of the People Party		571,078	0.09	1
Shiromani Akali Dal (Amritsar)		521,749	0.08	0
Socialist Unity Centre of India (Communist)		480,987	0.07	0
Gondwana Ganatantra Party		312,997	0.05	0
Bahujan Vikas Aaghadi		254,517	0.04	0
Peoples Party of India (Democratic)		247,985	0.04	0
Indian National Lok Dal		226,975	0.04	0
Zoram People's Movement		208,552	0.03	1
Jammu and Kashmir Apni Party		208,149	0.03	0
Swabhimani Paksha		185,371	0.03	0
Gana Suraksha Party		180,000	0.03	0
Jammu and Kashmir People's Conference		174,890	0.03	0
Rashtriya Jansambhavna Party		168,740	0.03	0
Republican Party of India (Athawale)		156,302	0.02	0
Twenty 20 Party		145,450	0.02	0
Mizo National Front		140,264	0.02	0
Ambedkarite Party of India		132,444	0.02	0
Bhartiya Shakti Chetna Party		115,024	0.02	0
Jannayak Janta Party		113,827	0.02	0
Akhil Bhartiya Parivar Party		110,212	0.02	0
Alliance of Democratic Reforms Party		108,334	0.02	0
Prahar Janshakti Party		90,759	0.01	0
Citizen Action Party – Sikkim		83,566	0.01	0
New Rashtriya Samaj Party		83,046	0.01	0
Bharatheeya Jawan Kisan Party		78,104	0.01	0
Sikkim Democratic Front		77,171	0.01	0
Bahujan Maha Party		76,254	0.01	0
Viro Ke Vir Indian Party		75,950	0.01	0
Bahujan Mukti Party		73,935	0.01	0
Samata Party		73,318	0.01	0
Navarang Congress Party		67,432	0.01	0
Samnak Janta Party		67,374	0.01	0
Revolutionary Goans Party		64,629	0.01	0
Voters Party International		63,496	0.01	0
Lokhit Adhikar Party		62,136	0.01	0
Moolniwasi Samaj Party		61,033	0.01	0
Ekam Sanatan Bharat Dal		61,024	0.01	0
Right to Recall Party		58,024	0.01	0
Rashtriya Shoshit Samaj Party		53,911	0.01	0
Bhagidari Party (P)		51,979	0.01	0
Karnataka Rashtra Samithi		51,529	0.01	0
Sardar Patel Siddhant Party		46,145	0.01	0
Republican Party of India (A)		45,567	0.01	0
United Democratic Party (Meghalaya)		44,563	0.01	0
Social Democratic Party of India		42,465	0.01	0
Hamar Raj Party		40,746	0.01	0
Democratic Progressive Azad Party		40,665	0.01	0
Uttama Prajaakeeya Party		40,491	0.01	0
Indian Peoples Green Party		39,778	0.01	0
Apna Dal (Kamerawadi)		39,128	0.01	0
Dharma Samaj Party		38,730	0.01	0
Peace Party of India		38,506	0.01	0
Baliraja Party		33,787	0.01	0
Bahujan Bharat Party		32,870	0.01	0
Rashtra Uday Party		30,073	0.00	0
Bahujan Republican Socialist Party		29,619	0.00	0
Aadarsh Mithila Party		29,550	0.00	0
Samaj Shakti Party		29,235	0.00	0
Rashtriya Samanta Dal		28,340	0.00	0
Bharatiya Nyay-Adhikar Raksha Party		28,192	0.00	0
Bharatiya Yuva Jan Ekta Party		27,969	0.00	0
Pyramid Party of India		27,966	0.00	0
Bharatiya Gana Parishad		27,554	0.00	0
Abhinav Rajasthan Party		26,294	0.00	0
Bharatiya Praja Aikyata Party		26,271	0.00	0
Moulik Adhikar Party		25,490	0.00	0
Bhim Sena		25,345	0.00	0
Sanyukt Kisan Vikas Party		25,291	0.00	0
Prabuddha Republican Party		24,361	0.00	0
Bhartiya Sarthak Party		23,640	0.00	0
Jammu and Kashmir National Panthers Party (Bhim)		23,268	0.00	0
Jatiya Jana Sena Party		22,935	0.00	0
Jai Bharat National Party		22,466	0.00	0
Al-Hind Party		22,308	0.00	0
Yuga Thulasi Party		22,247	0.00	0
Jagrook Janta Party		21,566	0.00	0
Bahujan Dravida Party		21,388	0.00	0
Shakti Sena (Bharat Desh)		21,036	0.00	0
Maharashtra Vikas Aghadi		20,721	0.00	0
Desh Janhit Party		20,498	0.00	0
Manas Lokshakti Dal		20,450	0.00	0
Sarv Adi Dal		20,348	0.00	0
Log Party		20,123	0.00	0
Socialist Party (India)		19,941	0.00	0
Jharkhand Party		19,527	0.00	0
Rashtriya Jan Kalyan Party Secular		19,495	0.00	0
Jharkhand People's Party		19,494	0.00	0
Rashtriya Jansabha Party		19,318	0.00	0
Republican Sena		18,793	0.00	0
Naba Bharata Nirmana Seva Party		18,570	0.00	0
Janta Kranti Party (Rashtravadi)		18,401	0.00	0
Samajhdar Party		18,223	0.00	0
Jai Maha Bharath Party		18,133	0.00	0
Mithilanchal Mukti Morcha		18,025	0.00	0
Kisan Mazdoor Sangharsh Party		17,336	0.00	0
Bharatha Chaitanya Yuvajana Party		17,173	0.00	0
The National Road Map Party of India		17,126	0.00	0
India Praja Bandhu Party		16,942	0.00	0
Navataram Party		16,864	0.00	0
Rashtriya Sanatan Party		16,859	0.00	0
National Apni Party		16,694	0.00	0
Karpoori Janta Dal		16,512	0.00	0
Wazib Adhikar Party		16,506	0.00	0
Sainik Samaj Party		16,040	0.00	0
Bhartiya Lokmat Rashtrwadi Party		15,411	0.00	0
Pragatisheel Manav Samaj Party		15,250	0.00	0
Jan Janwadi Party		15,240	0.00	0
Jaibhim Rao Bharat Party		15,165	0.00	0
Hindustan Vikas Dal		15,140	0.00	0
Aam Janta Party (India)		14,729	0.00	0
Jai Prakash Janata Dal		14,477	0.00	0
Rashtriya Praja Congress (Secular)		14,219	0.00	0
Jantantra Awaj Party		14,218	0.00	0
Mulnibasi Party of India		14,168	0.00	0
Proutist Bloc, India		14,110	0.00	0
Malwa Congress		13,925	0.00	0
Hindu Samaj Party		13,824	0.00	0
Rashtriya Ulama Council		13,657	0.00	0
Rashtriya Jan Jan Party		13,213	0.00	0
Jai Hind Party		13,014	0.00	0
Naadaalum Makkal Katchi		12,895	0.00	0
Swatantrata Abhivyakti Party		12,741	0.00	0
Veerath Thiyagi Viswanathadoss Thozhilalarkal Katchi		12,735	0.00	0
Bhartiya Lok Nayak Party		12,411	0.00	0
Mahanwadi Party		12,364	0.00	0
Rashtriya Kisan Bahujan Party		12,309	0.00	0
Parivartan Samaj Party		12,304	0.00	0
Naki Bharatiya Ekta Party		12,299	0.00	0
Praja Velugu Party		12,199	0.00	0
Bhartiya Rashtriya Dal		12,178	0.00	0
Rashtrawadi Janlok Party (Satya)		12,049	0.00	0
Azad Adhikar Sena		12,021	0.00	0
Bharatiya Jan Kranti Dal (Democratic)		11,914	0.00	0
Anna YSR Congress Party		11,459	0.00	0
Rashtriya Gondvana Party		11,446	0.00	0
National Loktantrik Party		11,286	0.00	0
Desiya Makkal Sakthi Katchi		11,211	0.00	0
Kamatapur People’s Party (United)		11,206	0.00	0
Bhartiya Dalit Party		11,139	0.00	0
National Jan Dal		11,116	0.00	0
United Republican Party of India		10,997	0.00	0
Hindustan People's Party (Democratic)		10,992	0.00	0
Bharatiya Momin Front		10,972	0.00	0
Rashtra Nirman Party		10,964	0.00	0
Rashtriya Samaj Dal (R)		10,877	0.00	0
Telangana Sakalajanula Party		10,859	0.00	0
Swarajya Shakti Sena		10,802	0.00	0
Swatantra Jantaraj Party		10,627	0.00	0
Pragatisheel Samaj Party		10,553	0.00	0
Apna Kisan Party		10,538	0.00	0
Dalita Bahujana Party		10,311	0.00	0
National Nava Kranthi Party		10,284	0.00	0
Bharatiya Kisan Parivartan Party		10,272	0.00	0
Rashtriya Uttarakhand Party		10,026	0.00	0
Indian National League		9,918	0.00	0
Akhil Hind Forward Bloc (Krantikari)		9,902	0.00	0
Asom Jana Morcha		9,895	0.00	0
Rashtriya Devbhumi Party		9,781	0.00	0
Aam Janta Party Rashtriya		9,760	0.00	0
Autonomous State Demand Committee		9,633	0.00	0
Bahujan Samaj Party (Ambedkar)		9,391	0.00	0
Sanatan Sanskriti Raksha Dal		9,347	0.00	0
Rashtriya Jan Awaz Party		9,299	0.00	0
Telangana Praja Shakthi Party		9,290	0.00	0
Uttarakhand Kranti Dal		9,270	0.00	0
Bharatiya National Janata Dal		9,258	0.00	0
Bharatiya Bahujan Congress		9,165	0.00	0
Jan Sewa Driver Party		9,135	0.00	0
Anti Corruption Dynamic Party		9,128	0.00	0
Samaniya Makkal Nala Katchi		8,990	0.00	0
Minorities Democratic Party		8,978	0.00	0
Hindrashtra Sangh		8,970	0.00	0
Jai Samta Party		8,933	0.00	0
Janata Congress		8,900	0.00	0
Liberation Congress Party		8,900	0.00	0
Bhartiya Kranti Vir Party		8,749	0.00	0
Yuva Krantikari Party		8,736	0.00	0
Akhil Bhartiya Apna Dal		8,678	0.00	0
Abhay Samaj Party		8,583	0.00	0
New India United Party		8,542	0.00	0
Social Justice Party of India		8,519	0.00	0
Mera Adhikaar Rashtriya Dal		8,514	0.00	0
Democratic Bharatiya Samaj Party		8,472	0.00	0
Jammu and Kashmir Nationalist People's Front		8,453	0.00	0
Parcham Party of India		8,404	0.00	0
Dhanwan Bharat Party		8,389	0.00	0
Nationalist Justice Party		8,357	0.00	0
Eklavya Samaj Party		8,352	0.00	0
Aravor Munnetra Kazhagam		8,345	0.00	0
Andaman Nicobar Democratic Congress		8,254	0.00	0
Purvanchal Mahapanchayat		8,217	0.00	0
Janhit Sankalp Party		8,194	0.00	0
Aas Punjab Party		8,114	0.00	0
Dr. Ambedkar People's Party		8,089	0.00	0
Dhesiya Makkal Kazhagam		8,089	0.00	0
Hindustan Janta Party		7,914	0.00	0
Rashtriya Jansangharsh Swaraj Party		7,803	0.00	0
Ganasangam Party of India		7,776	0.00	0
Gunj Satya Ni Janata Party		7,761	0.00	0
Bajjikanchal Vikas Party		7,747	0.00	0
Bharat Jan Jagran Dal		7,736	0.00	0
Global Republican Party		7,734	0.00	0
Praja Shanthi Party		7,696	0.00	0
Jai Swaraj Party		7,684	0.00	0
Rashtriya Jankranti Party		7,646	0.00	0
Haryana Jansena Party		7,646	0.00	0
Loktantrik Samajwadi Party		7,554	0.00	0
Naam Indiar Party		7,430	0.00	0
All India Arya Mahasabha		7,345	0.00	0
Manavtawadi Samaj Party		7,136	0.00	0
Samruddha Odisha		7,087	0.00	0
Marxist Leninist Party of India (Red Flag)		7,085	0.00	0
Jan Sangh Party		7,060	0.00	0
Sarv Samaj Party		6,879	0.00	0
Andhra Rastra Praja Samithi		6,846	0.00	0
Subhashwadi Bhartiya Samajwadi Party (Subhas Party)		6,698	0.00	0
Vishwa Kalyan Rashtriya Manav Samaj Party		6,678	0.00	0
Party for Democratic Socialism		6,651	0.00	0
Arunachal Democratic Party		6,622	0.00	0
Rashtriya Jansanchar Dal		6,617	0.00	0
Samata Samadhan Party		6,614	0.00	0
Nyaydharmsabha		6,607	0.00	0
Bheem Tribal Congress		6,603	0.00	0
Loktantrik Samajik Nyay Party		6,542	0.00	0
Samaj Vikas Kranti Party		6,373	0.00	0
Bharat Jago Janta Party		6,340	0.00	0
Rashtriya Janshakti Party (Secular)		6,251	0.00	0
Chhattisgarh Vikas Ganga Rashtriya Party		6,227	0.00	0
Bhartiya Awam Party (Rastriya)		6,160	0.00	0
Aapki Awaaz Party		6,087	0.00	0
Sanman Rajkiya Paksha		6,075	0.00	0
North Bengal People’s Party		6,073	0.00	0
Bharat Jodo Party		6,045	0.00	0
Aapki Apni Party (Peoples)		6,033	0.00	0
Bhartiya Jan Samman Party		5,968	0.00	0
Rashtra Sewa Dal		5,919	0.00	0
Telugu Rajadhikara Samiti Party		5,906	0.00	0
Bhartiya Lok Chetna Party		5,852	0.00	0
Aihra National Party		5,833	0.00	0
Indian National Socialistic Action Forces		5,781	0.00	0
Uttarakhand Parivartan Party		5,778	0.00	0
Sarva Janata Party		5,771	0.00	0
Bhartiya Krishak Dal		5,723	0.00	0
Rashtravadi Bharat Party		5,702	0.00	0
Hindustan Shakti Sena		5,625	0.00	0
Bharatiya Aam Awam Party		5,585	0.00	0
Jaathia Chethi Vruthula Ikya Vedika Party		5,568	0.00	0
Karnataka Jantha Paksha		5,491	0.00	0
Adarsh Nyay Rakshak Party		5,484	0.00	0
All India Majlis-E-Inquilab-E-Millat		5,454	0.00	0
Jai Hind National Party		5,451	0.00	0
National Awami United Party		5,319	0.00	0
Samaj Parivartan Party		5,303	0.00	0
Samyak Party		5,250	0.00	0
Krupaa Party		5,242	0.00	0
Delhi Janta Party		5,235	0.00	0
Dharmarajya Paksha		5,233	0.00	0
Bhartiya Navjawan Sena (Paksha)		5,183	0.00	0
Kisan Kranti Dal		5,153	0.00	0
Sardar Vallabhbhai Patel Party		5,152	0.00	0
Sapaks Party		5,149	0.00	0
Sabhi Jan Party		5,147	0.00	0
Apni Ekta Party		5,139	0.00	0
Rashtriya Garib Dal		5,105	0.00	0
Loktantra Congress Party		5,100	0.00	0
National World Leader Party		5,063	0.00	0
Public Political Party		5,054	0.00	0
Janhit Kisan Party		5,030	0.00	0
Political Justice Party		5,023	0.00	0
Sarvjan Samta Party		5,020	0.00	0
Hindustan Samaj Party		4,991	0.00	0
Bharat Rakshak Party (Democratic)		4,961	0.00	0
Jay Vidarbha Party		4,951	0.00	0
Punjab National Party		4,934	0.00	0
Amra Bangalee		4,925	0.00	0
Bhartiya Gandhiwadi Party		4,822	0.00	0
Rashtriya Republican Party		4,801	0.00	0
Sikkim Republican Party		4,799	0.00	0
Puthiya Makkal Tamil Desam Katchi		4,768	0.00	0
Rashtriya Mahaswaraj Bhumi Party		4,764	0.00	0
Vidhyarthula Rajakiya Party		4,747	0.00	0
Bhartiya Rashtriya Ekta Dal		4,732	0.00	0
Anna MGR Dravida Makkal Kalgam		4,629	0.00	0
Shoshit Samaj Dal		4,618	0.00	0
Janseva Gondwana Party		4,617	0.00	0
Bharat Mahaparivar Party		4,582	0.00	0
Janshakti Samta Party		4,577	0.00	0
Tipu Sultan Party		4,547	0.00	0
Bhartiya Samajik Party		4,507	0.00	0
Karunaadu Party		4,481	0.00	0
Telangana Rashtra Punahnirmana Samithi		4,433	0.00	0
Azad Janata Party		4,429	0.00	0
Rishivadi Karm Sheel Young Parmarthi Party		4,401	0.00	0
Jebamani Janata		4,356	0.00	0
Bhartiya Panchsheel Party		4,345	0.00	0
Bharatiya Asha Party		4,300	0.00	0
Apna Desh Party		4,297	0.00	0
Kalinga Sena		4,284	0.00	0
Akhil Bhartiya Hamara Samaj Party		4,225	0.00	0
Gujarat Sarva Samaj Party		4,211	0.00	0
National Maha Sabha Party		4,184	0.00	0
Karunada Sevakara Party		4,175	0.00	0
Loktantrik Lok Rajyam Party		4,169	0.00	0
Apni Prajahit Party		4,109	0.00	0
Apna Haq Party		4,094	0.00	0
Swaraj Bhartiya Nyay Party		4,088	0.00	0
Indian Peoples Adhikar Party		4,041	0.00	0
Tamilaga Makkal Thannurimai Katchi		4,033	0.00	0
Bhartiya Jan Parishad		4,020	0.00	0
Bharathiya YuvaKula Dalam		4,007	0.00	0
Bahujan Awam Party		3,989	0.00	0
Garib Kalyan Party		3,979	0.00	0
Lok Jan Sangharsh Party		3,954	0.00	0
Akhand Bharat Samrajya Party		3,930	0.00	0
Rashtriya Samta Vikas Party		3,926	0.00	0
Rashtrawadi Chetna Party		3,915	0.00	0
Rashtriya Manav Party		3,905	0.00	0
Akhil Bhartiya Sarvjan Hit Party		3,892	0.00	0
Akhila Vijaya Party		3,882	0.00	0
Gondwana Dandkaranya Party		3,857	0.00	0
Swatantra Kisan Party		3,849	0.00	0
Uttarakhand Samanta Party		3,845	0.00	0
Mizoram People's Conference		3,793	0.00	0
Insaniyat Party		3,790	0.00	0
Thakkam Katchi		3,785	0.00	0
Bharat Nirman Party		3,772	0.00	0
Telugu Nava Garjana Party		3,741	0.00	0
Country Citizen Party		3,712	0.00	0
Asankhya Samaj Party		3,672	0.00	0
Sanyukt Bharat Paksh		3,656	0.00	0
Mana Telangana Rashtra Samaikya Party		3,634	0.00	0
Jai Sewalal Bahujan Vikas Party		3,628	0.00	0
All India Youth Development Party		3,528	0.00	0
Lok Sewa Dal		3,519	0.00	0
Marxist Communist Party of India (United)		3,505	0.00	0
Naari Nar Rakshak Party		3,501	0.00	0
Bharatiya Bikash Parishad		3,430	0.00	0
Prabuddhwadi Bahujan Morcha		3,414	0.00	0
Sunder Samaj Party		3,409	0.00	0
People's Party of India(secular)		3,392	0.00	0
Jan Raajya Party		3,376	0.00	0
Bharatiya Rashtriya Morcha		3,358	0.00	0
Vanchitsamaj Insaaf Party		3,330	0.00	0
Sarvjan Lok Shakti Party		3,280	0.00	0
Janta Samta Party		3,264	0.00	0
Rashtriya Janshakti Party(Eklavya)		3,263	0.00	0
Majloom Samaj Party		3,237	0.00	0
Rashtra Samarpan Party		3,205	0.00	0
Aam Janmat Party,		3,205	0.00	0
Republican Party of India		3,204	0.00	0
Republican Bahujan Sena		3,161	0.00	0
Abua Jharkhand Party		3,155	0.00	0
Bhartiya Jantantra Morcha		3,094	0.00	0
Anna Puratchi Thalaivar Amma Dravida Munnetra Kazhagam		3,078	0.00	0
Bhumiputra United Party		3,018	0.00	0
Bhartiya Azad Sena		3,018	0.00	0
Lok Swarajya Party		2,992	0.00	0
Rashtriya Janshakti Samaj Party		2,988	0.00	0
Mahathma Makkal Munnetra Kazhakam		2,981	0.00	0
Rashtriya Maratha Party		2,978	0.00	0
Kranti Kari Jai Hind Sena		2,976	0.00	0
Jan Shakti Dal		2,955	0.00	0
Justice Party		2,946	0.00	0
Sampoorna Bharat Kranti Party		2,944	0.00	0
Ummeed Party of India		2,944	0.00	0
Samst Samaj Party		2,904	0.00	0
Navabharath Sena		2,898	0.00	0
Republican Party of India (Social)		2,818	0.00	0
Bharatiya Prajagala Kalyana Paksha		2,816	0.00	0
Azad Samaj Party		2,791	0.00	0
Navyug Pragatisheel Morcha		2,779	0.00	0
Akhil Bharatiya Congress Dal (Ambedkar)		2,777	0.00	0
Garib Democratic Party		2,748	0.00	0
Bharatiya Praja Surajya Paksha		2,737	0.00	0
Saath Sahakar Vikas Party		2,673	0.00	0
Sathi Aur Aapka Faisala Party		2,666	0.00	0
Bhartiya Jan Samrat Party		2,640	0.00	0
Jharkhand Mukti Morcha (Ulgulan)		2,615	0.00	0
Viduthalai Kalam Katchi		2,599	0.00	0
Bharatiya Majdoor Janta Party		2,566	0.00	0
Swarajya Sena (Maharashtra)		2,533	0.00	0
Smart Indians Party		2,510	0.00	0
Anna Makkal Katchi		2,505	0.00	0
All India Ulama Congress		2,500	0.00	0
Pragatisheel Magahi Samaj		2,468	0.00	0
Gujarat Loktantra Party		2,458	0.00	0
Odisha Janata Party		2,442	0.00	0
Bharatiya Nagrik Party		2,434	0.00	0
Aapka Gantantra Party		2,432	0.00	0
Prajatantra Aadhar Party		2,429	0.00	0
Bhartiya Manavta Party		2,426	0.00	0
Gareeb Aadmi Party		2,425	0.00	0
Ahimsa Socialist Party		2,421	0.00	0
Bangali Nabanirman Sena		2,410	0.00	0
India Greens Party		2,387	0.00	0
Sarva Samaj Janata Party		2,379	0.00	0
Vishva Shakti Party		2,361	0.00	0
Lok Sena Party		2,350	0.00	0
Rashtriya Jantantrik Bharat Vikas Party		2,347	0.00	0
National Youth Party		2,343	0.00	0
Dalit Soshit Pichhara Varg Adhikar Dal		2,342	0.00	0
Rayalaseema Rashtra Samithi		2,333	0.00	0
Samajwadi Janata Party(Karnataka)		2,320	0.00	0
Tamil Manila Murpokku Dravida Kazhagam		2,315	0.00	0
Azad Party		2,311	0.00	0
Bharat Ki Lok Jimmedar Party		2,310	0.00	0
Rashtriya Jan Utkarsh Party		2,309	0.00	0
Rashtriya Sawarn Dal		2,293	0.00	0
Utkal Samaj		2,285	0.00	0
Akhil Bharat Hindu Mahasabha		2,278	0.00	0
New India Party		2,269	0.00	0
Aanaithinthiya Jananayaka Pathukappu Kazhagam		2,244	0.00	0
Sarvjan Awaz Party		2,239	0.00	0
Chennai Youth Party		2,195	0.00	0
Loktantrik Janshakti Party		2,191	0.00	0
Aam Aadmi Parivartan Party		2,128	0.00	0
Akhil Bhartiya Manavadhikar Vichar Manch Party		2,108	0.00	0
Majdoor Kisan Union Party		2,105	0.00	0
Rashtriya Power Party		2,101	0.00	0
Jai Hind Congress Party		2,101	0.00	0
Prabal Bharat Party		2,099	0.00	0
Sunahara Bharat Party		2,091	0.00	0
Most Backward Classes Of India		2,090	0.00	0
Apna Samaj Party		2,083	0.00	0
Manviya Bharat Party		2,082	0.00	0
Vikas Insaf Party		2,033	0.00	0
Sabse Achchhi Party		2,029	0.00	0
Republican Party of India (Karnataka)		2,018	0.00	0
Bhartiya Sarvdharm Party		2,012	0.00	0
People’s Union Party		2,009	0.00	0
Spashtwadi Jan Aadhar Party		2,003	0.00	0
National Black Panther Party		1,994	0.00	0
Yuva Bihar Sena		1,990	0.00	0
Bhartiya Lokvani Party		1,956	0.00	0
Sankhyanupati Bhagidari Party		1,949	0.00	0
Saman Adhikar Party		1,943	0.00	0
Janta Shashan Party		1,942	0.00	0
Bhartiya Jan Adhikar Party		1,940	0.00	0
Humanity for Peace Party		1,935	0.00	0
Madhya Pradesh Jan Vikas Party		1,932	0.00	0
Ulzaipali Makkal Katchy		1,929	0.00	0
Mang Samaj Party		1,905	0.00	0
Tamilar Makkal Katchi		1,904	0.00	0
Samajwadi Lok Parishad		1,880	0.00	0
Bharatiya Sampuran Krantikari Party		1,880	0.00	0
Bhartiya Asmita Party		1,874	0.00	0
Kannada Chalavali Vatal Paksha		1,867	0.00	0
The Agrani Party		1,843	0.00	0
Bhartiya Jan Nayak Party		1,838	0.00	0
Vidarbha Rajya Aghadi		1,828	0.00	0
Himachal Janta Party		1,825	0.00	0
Adarsh Jankalyan Dal		1,817	0.00	0
Rashtriya Hind Ekta Dal		1,806	0.00	0
Blue India Party		1,803	0.00	0
Makkal Nalvaazhvuk Katchi		1,792	0.00	0
Prajavani Party		1,792	0.00	0
National Party		1,767	0.00	0
People Protection Party		1,737	0.00	0
Kosal Janata Dal		1,735	0.00	0
Indian Labour Party (Ambedkar Phule)		1,729	0.00	0
Telangana Rajya Samithi		1,727	0.00	0
Ambedkarist Republican Party		1,727	0.00	0
Akhand Bharat Janpriya Party		1,716	0.00	0
Aim Political Party		1,715	0.00	0
Bharatiya Ekta Dal		1,704	0.00	0
Kamgaar Kisan Party		1,701	0.00	0
Ahinsa Samaj Party		1,698	0.00	0
Jindabad Kranti Party		1,690	0.00	0
Parivartan Party of India		1,686	0.00	0
Bhartiya Janta Secular Party		1,685	0.00	0
Rashtra Dharak Dal		1,683	0.00	0
Paschimanchal Vikas Party		1,682	0.00	0
Yuva Vikas Party		1,679	0.00	0
Bharat Jan Aadhar Party		1,675	0.00	0
Telangana Jaghir Party		1,648	0.00	0
Jana Sahayaka Sakthi		1,644	0.00	0
Rashtriya Lokswaraj Party		1,641	0.00	0
Rashtriya Janmorcha		1,639	0.00	0
Samajwadi Jan Parishad		1,637	0.00	0
Atulya Bharat Party		1,617	0.00	0
Young Star Empowerment Party		1,616	0.00	0
Prajarajya Samithi		1,614	0.00	0
Hamara Sahara Party		1,614	0.00	0
Sanjhi Virasat Party		1,610	0.00	0
Abhinav Bharat Janseva Paksh		1,602	0.00	0
Lokshahi Ekta Party		1,585	0.00	0
Adim Bhartiya Dal		1,584	0.00	0
Janta Samajwadi Party (Vivek Raj)		1,574	0.00	0
Hindvi Swarajyay Dal		1,573	0.00	0
Indian Unity Centre		1,572	0.00	0
Bharatiya Liberal Party		1,552	0.00	0
Bhartiya Party		1,549	0.00	0
Bharatiya Lokshakti Party		1,537	0.00	0
Rashtriya Narayanwadi Vikas Party		1,527	0.00	0
All Peoples Party		1,495	0.00	0
Rashtriya Sanskriti Party		1,494	0.00	0
Public Adhikar Socialist Indian Party		1,493	0.00	0
Tamizhaga Murpokku Makkal Katchi		1,488	0.00	0
Bhartiya Uday Nirman Party		1,483	0.00	0
Aam Janshakti Party		1,478	0.00	0
Rashtra Samanya Praja Party		1,474	0.00	0
Janlok Vikas Party		1,473	0.00	0
Bharatiya Bahujan Samta Party		1,459	0.00	0
Telangana Republican Party		1,452	0.00	0
AARAKSHAN VIRODHI PARTY		1,444	0.00	0
Supreme Zero Party of Bharat		1,441	0.00	0
Vishal Janta Party		1,421	0.00	0
Samrat Mihir Bhoj Samaj Party		1,412	0.00	0
Swayam Shashan Party		1,408	0.00	0
Super Power India Party		1,400	0.00	0
Adarsh Janta Party,		1,376	0.00	0
All India Mazdoor Party (Rangreta)		1,374	0.00	0
Yuva Taram Party		1,369	0.00	0
Hindustan Janta Party Secular		1,366	0.00	0
Prithviraj Janshakti Party		1,364	0.00	0
Bhartiya Garib Vikas Kalyan Party		1,347	0.00	0
Rashtriya Janmanch (Secular)		1,333	0.00	0
Gorkha Rashtriya Congress		1,331	0.00	0
Sakala Janula Party		1,324	0.00	0
Rashtriya Janta Party		1,319	0.00	0
Janshakti Janta Dal		1,318	0.00	0
Lok Samaj Party		1,294	0.00	0
Rashtriya Vikalp Party		1,269	0.00	0
Bahujana Left Party		1,265	0.00	0
Rajasthan Raj Party		1,264	0.00	0
Akhil Bharatiya Hind Kranti Party		1,259	0.00	0
Praja Ektha Party		1,252	0.00	0
Challengers Party		1,243	0.00	0
Rashtriya Vikas Party		1,240	0.00	0
Indian Believers Party (IBP)		1,239	0.00	0
Pehchan People’s Party		1,228	0.00	0
Sarvar Party		1,202	0.00	0
National Future Party		1,197	0.00	0
Megh Desham Party		1,194	0.00	0
National Janmandal Party		1,193	0.00	0
Sajag Samaj Party		1,191	0.00	0
Awami Samta Party		1,190	0.00	0
Kamera Samaj Party		1,177	0.00	0
Adarshwaadi Congress Party		1,173	0.00	0
Rashtriya Janutthan Party		1,157	0.00	0
Rashtriya Secular Majlis Party		1,136	0.00	0
New Generation People’s Party		1,133	0.00	0
Janahitha Paksha		1,130	0.00	0
Sanyogwadi Party		1,128	0.00	0
Jan Sewak Kranti Party		1,120	0.00	0
Indian Movement Party		1,117	0.00	0
Rastriya Atal Janta Party		1,116	0.00	0
Aadim Samaj Party		1,100	0.00	0
Rashtriya Janhit Sangharsh Party		1,090	0.00	0
Dr. Bhimrao Ambedkar Dal		1,078	0.00	0
Manav Kranti Party		1,076	0.00	0
Vidiyalai Thedum Indhiyargal Party		1,073	0.00	0
Proutist Sarva Samaj		1,069	0.00	0
Lokrajya Janata Party		1,061	0.00	0
Akhil Bharatiya Manavata Paksha		1,057	0.00	0
Vikas India Party		1,054	0.00	0
Shiromani Lok Dal Party		1,044	0.00	0
Punnagai Desam Party		1,040	0.00	0
Netaji Subhash Chander Bose Rashtriya Azad Party		1,019	0.00	0
Rashtriya Sant Sandesh Party		994	0.00	0
Sehajdhari Sikh Party		987	0.00	0
Rashtriya Jansena Party		983	0.00	0
India Manus Party		982	0.00	0
Karnataka Praja Party (RaithaParva)		978	0.00	0
Mission All India Independent Justice Party		960	0.00	0
Janta Darbar Party		956	0.00	0
Buland Bharat Party		955	0.00	0
Pichhara Samaj Party United		952	0.00	0
Welfare Party Of India		951	0.00	0
All India Uzhavargal Uzhaippalargal Katchi		950	0.00	0
Bharatiya Jan Morcha Party		945	0.00	0
Aman Samaj Party		945	0.00	0
Bhartiya Rashtriya Jansatta		941	0.00	0
Bahujan Kranti Party (Marxwad- Ambedkarwad)		940	0.00	0
Janta Raj Vikas Party		939	0.00	0
Anaithu India Makkal Katchi		937	0.00	0
Janta Kranti Party		936	0.00	0
Samaj Bhalai Morcha		930	0.00	0
Akhil Bhartiya Kisan Majdoor Party		924	0.00	0
Swaraj Kranti Party		909	0.00	0
Democratic Socialist Party of India		885	0.00	0
Bharatiya Jan Jagriti Party		879	0.00	0
Aadarsh Sangram Party		865	0.00	0
Uttar Pradesh Republican Party		854	0.00	0
Digvijaya Bharatha Party		850	0.00	0
Republican Party of India Bharatha		848	0.00	0
Indian National Yuva Jana Party		847	0.00	0
Jan Shakti Ekta Party		847	0.00	0
Satya Bahumat Party		842	0.00	0
Bhartiya Sabka Dal		841	0.00	0
Akhil Bharatiya Muslim League (Secular)		821	0.00	0
New Labour Party		819	0.00	0
Akhil Bhartiya Aamjan Party		818	0.00	0
Kunbi Bahujan Sawrajya Party		817	0.00	0
Pachchasi Parivartan Samaj Party		802	0.00	0
Jana Shankhaaraavam Party		797	0.00	0
Rashtriy Bahujan Party		795	0.00	0
Rashtriya Mazdoor Ekta Party		791	0.00	0
Telugu Congress Party		790	0.00	0
Chhatrapati Shivaji Bhartiya Garib Party		790	0.00	0
Lokpriya Rashtrawadi Party		782	0.00	0
Anjaan Aadmi Party		781	0.00	0
Akhand Bharat Swatantra Party		780	0.00	0
Mission Naya Digant Party		772	0.00	0
Rani Chennamma Party		771	0.00	0
Bhrashtachar Mukti Morcha		766	0.00	0
Rashtriya Jan Karmath Party		764	0.00	0
Tamilaga Makkal Nala Katchi		761	0.00	0
Bhartiya Mahasangh Party		758	0.00	0
Aadi Bharat Party		742	0.00	0
Jamat-E-Seratul Mustakim		741	0.00	0
Makkal Nala Kazhagam		736	0.00	0
Bharatiya Lokvikas Party		723	0.00	0
All India People Development Party		711	0.00	0
Jai Hindustan Party		711	0.00	0
BhartiyaBahujanKranti Dal		709	0.00	0
Aam Lok Party United		695	0.00	0
Ambedkar National Congress		688	0.00	0
Rashtriya Congress(J) Party		685	0.00	0
Bharat Peoples Sena		683	0.00	0
Satyawadi Rakshak Party		657	0.00	0
National Republic Party Of India		657	0.00	0
Sacho Sach Party		652	0.00	0
Youth India Peace Party		649	0.00	0
Adarsh Samaj Party		643	0.00	0
Rashtravadi Loktantrik Party (India)		641	0.00	0
Praja Prasthanam Party		633	0.00	0
All India Jananayaka Makkal Kazhagam		633	0.00	0
Manav Samadhan Party		622	0.00	0
Rashtriya Rashtrawadi Party		614	0.00	0
Bharatiya Inqalab Party		610	0.00	0
Mera Bharat Mahan Party		604	0.00	0
Kisan Vishwa Party		603	0.00	0
Voters Independent Party		601	0.00	0
Aawami Pichhada Party		594	0.00	0
Bahujan National Party (Ambedkar)		586	0.00	0
Guruchand Sena Dal		583	0.00	0
All India Kisan Janatha party		578	0.00	0
Kranti Janshakti Party		575	0.00	0
Rashtriya Suraksha Party		574	0.00	0
Dalit Kranti Dal		547	0.00	0
Navsarjan Bharat Party		545	0.00	0
Akhil Bhartiya Aarakshit Samaj Party		544	0.00	0
Aap Sabki Apni Party		528	0.00	0
Raita Bharat Party		518	0.00	0
All India Mahila Empowerment Party		515	0.00	0
Corruption Abolition Party		501	0.00	0
Bhartiya Panchyat Party		494	0.00	0
Secular Democratic Congress		490	0.00	0
Kannada Paksha		477	0.00	0
Hamara Sahi Vikalp Party		476	0.00	0
Bhartiya Veer Dal		470	0.00	0
Bengaluru Nava Nirmana Party		461	0.00	0
Radical Party of India (Ambedkarist)		454	0.00	0
Desh Prem Party		454	0.00	0
Sarvlokhit Samaj Party		446	0.00	0
Dhoom Sena		434	0.00	0
Neethi Nijayithi Party		430	0.00	0
Maa Telangana Party		423	0.00	0
Samajik Sangharsh Party		419	0.00	0
Navodayam Party		414	0.00	0
All India National Raksha Sena		396	0.00	0
Bharatiya Mulnivasi Aazad Party		396	0.00	0
Bhartiya Jan Vikas Aaghadi		391	0.00	0
Bahujan Shoshit Samaj Sangharsh Samta Party		373	0.00	0
Andhra Pradesh Rashtra Samithi		358	0.00	0
Akhil Bhartiya Sudhar Party		321	0.00	0
Loktantrik Janta Dal		316	0.00	0
Tamil Nadu Makkal Nalvazhvu Periyakkam		314	0.00	0
Karnataka Karmikara Paksha		314	0.00	0
Bharatrashtra Democratic Party		310	0.00	0
All India Jaihind Party		269	0.00	0
Bharat Lok Sewak Party		262	0.00	0
Republican Party of India (Sivaraj)		259	0.00	0
Rashtriya Mangalam Party		257	0.00	0
Rashtriya Jatigat Aarakshan Virodhi Party		215	0.00	0
All India Backward People Sunami Party		210	0.00	0
Telangana Prajaa Jeevana Rythu Party		141	0.00	0
Indian Praja Congress		141	0.00	0
Independents		17,850,062	2.77	7
None of the above		6,371,839	0.99	–
Total		645,362,531	100.00	543
Valid votes		645,362,531	99.84	
Invalid/blank votes		1,058,338	0.16	
Total votes		646,420,869	100.00	
Registered voters/turnout		977,965,560	66.10	
Source: ECI

== Results by election phases ==
Name of Alliance	Phase 1	Phase 2	Phase 3	Phase 4	Phase 5	Phase 6	Phase 7
National Democratic Alliance	34	53	66	60	23	37	20
Indian National Developmental Inclusive Alliance	65	33 (Note: Outer Manipur has 1 seat for alliance due to polling was conducted in 2 phases)	26	31	24	21	34
Others	3	1	2	5	2	0	3
Total	102	87 (Note: Polling for Outer Manipur was conducted in 2 phases, however, for the sake of clarity, it has been included in a single phase in this table)	94	96	49	58	57

== Results by States and Union Territories ==
=== Overall ===
State/Union Territory	Seats			
State/Union Territory	Seats	NDA	INDIA	Others
Andaman and Nicobar Islands	1	1	0	0
Andhra Pradesh	25	21	0	4
Arunachal Pradesh	2	2	0	0
Assam	14	11	3	0
Bihar	40	30	9	1
Chandigarh	1	0	1	0
Chhattisgarh	11	10	1	0
Dadra and Nagar Haveli and Daman and Diu	2	1	0	1
Delhi	7	7	0	0
Goa	2	1	1	0
Gujarat	26	25	1	0
Haryana	10	5	5	0
Himachal Pradesh	4	4	0	0
Jammu and Kashmir	5	2	2	1
Jharkhand	14	9	5	0
Karnataka	28	19	9	0
Kerala	20	1	19	0
Ladakh	1	0	0	1
Lakshadweep	1	0	1	0
Madhya Pradesh	29	29	0	0
Maharashtra	48	17	30	1
Manipur	2	0	2	0
Meghalaya	2	0	1	1
Mizoram	1	0	0	1
Nagaland	1	0	1	0
Odisha	21	20	1	0
Puducherry	1	0	1	0
Punjab	13	0	10	3
Rajasthan	25	14	11	0
Sikkim	1	1	0	0
Tamil Nadu	39	0	39	0
Telangana	17	8	8	1
Tripura	2	2	0	0
Uttar Pradesh	80	36	43	1
Uttarakhand	5	5	0	0
West Bengal	42	12	30	0
Total	543	293	234	16

=== Andaman & Nicobar Islands (1) ===
BJP (1)

Alliance/ Party		Popular vote			Seats		
Alliance/ Party		Votes	%	±pp	Contested	Won	+/−
NDA	BJP	1,02,182	52.17%	▲6.79%	1	1	▲1
INDIA	INC	77,829	38.53%	▼7.44%	1	0	▼1
Total		202,514	100%	-	12	1	-

=== Andhra Pradesh (25) ===
TDP (16)	YSRCP (4)	BJP (3)	JSP (2)

Party	Alliance	Vote Share %	Change	Seats won	Changes
Telugu Desam Party	NDA	37.79	▼2.40	16	▲13
YSR Congress Party	None	39.61	▼10.28	4	▼18
Bharatiya Janata Party	NDA	11.28	▲10.30	3	▲3
Jana Sena Party	NDA	4.30	▼1.57	2	▲2
Indian National Congress	INDIA	2.66	▲1.35	0	Steady

=== Arunachal Pradesh (2) ===
BJP (2)

Party	Alliance	Vote Share %	Change	Seats won	Changes
Bharatiya Janata Party	NDA	48.87	▼9.35	2	Steady
Indian National Congress	INDIA	30.37	▲9.68	0	Steady

=== Assam (14) ===
BJP (9)	INC (3)	AGP (1)	UPPL (1)

Party	Alliance	Vote Share %	Change	Seats won	Changes
Bharatiya Janata Party	NDA	37.43	▲1.02	9	Steady
Indian National Congress	INDIA	37.48	▲1.69	3	Steady
Asom Gana Parishad	NDA	6.46	▼1.85	1	▲1
United People's Party Liberal	NDA	2.43	New	1	▲1
All India United Democratic Front	None	3.13	▼4.74	0	▼1

=== Bihar (40) ===
BJP (12)	JDU (12)	LJP (5)	RJD (4)	INC (3)	CPI(ML) (2)	HAM (1)	IND (1)

Party	Alliance	Vote Share %	Change	Seats won	Changes
Bharatiya Janata Party	NDA	20.52	▼1.06	12	▼5
Janata Dal (United)	NDA	18.52	▼1.29	12	▼4
Lok Janshakti Party	NDA	6.47	▼1.39	5	▼1
Rashtriya Janata Dal	INDIA	22.14	▲5.78	4	▲4
Indian National Congress	INDIA	9.20	▲1.50	3	▲2
Communist Party of India (Marxist-Leninist)	INDIA	2.99	▲1.59	2	▲2
Hindustani Awam Morcha	NDA			1	▲1
Independent	None			1	▲1

=== Chandigarh (1) ===
INC (1)

Party	Alliance	Vote Share %	Change	Seats won	Changes
Indian National Congress	INDIA	48.23	▲7.88	1	▲1
Bharatiya Janata Party	NDA	47.66	▼2.98	0	▼1

=== Chhattisgarh (11) ===
BJP (10)	INC (1)

Party	Alliance	Vote Share %	Change	Seats won	Changes
Bharatiya Janata Party	NDA	52.65	▲1.21	10	▲1
Indian National Congress	INDIA	41.06	▼0.45	1	▼1

=== Dadra & Nagar Haveli and Daman and Diu(2) ===
BJP (1)	IND (1)

Party	Alliance	Vote Share %	Change	Seats won	Changes
Bharatiya Janata Party	NDA	52.79		1	Steady
Independent	None			1	Steady
Indian National Congress	INDIA	25.09		0	Steady

=== NCT of Delhi (7) ===
BJP (7)

Party	Alliance	Vote Share %	Change	Seats won	Changes
Bharatiya Janata Party	NDA	54.35	▼2.21	7	Steady
Aam Aadmi Party	INDIA	24.17	▲6.06	0	Steady
Indian National Congress	INDIA	18.91	▼3.60	0	Steady

=== Goa (2) ===
BJP (1)	INC (1)

Party	Alliance	Vote Share %	Change	Seats won	Changes
Bharatiya Janata Party	NDA	50.79	▼0.39	1	Steady
Indian National Congress	INDIA	39.71	▼3.21	1	Steady

=== Gujarat (26) ===
BJP (25)	INC (1)

Party	Alliance	Vote Share %	Change	Seats won	Changes
Bharatiya Janata Party	NDA	61.86	▼0.35	25	▼1
Indian National Congress	INDIA	31.24	▼0.87	1	▲1
Aam Aadmi Party	INDIA	2.69	New	0	Steady

=== Haryana (10) ===
BJP (5)	INC (5)

Party	Alliance	Vote Share %	Change	Seats won	Change
Bharatiya Janata Party	NDA	46.11	▼12.10	5	▼5
Indian National Congress	INDIA	47.61	▲15.16	5	▲5
Aam Aadmi Party	INDIA	3.94	New	0	Steady

=== Himachal Pradesh (4) ===
BJP (4)

Party	Alliance	Vote Share %	Change	Seats won	Changes
Bharatiya Janata Party	NDA	56.44	▼12.67	4	Steady
Indian National Congress	INDIA	41.67	▲14.37	0	Steady

=== Jammu and Kashmir (5) ===
BJP (2)	JKNC (2)	IND (1)

Party	Alliance	Vote Share %	Change	Seats won	Changes
Bharatiya Janata Party	NDA	24.36	▼2.01	2	Steady
Jammu & Kashmir National Conference	INDIA	22.30	▲14.41	2	▼1
Independent				1	▲1
Indian National Congress	INDIA	19.38	▼9.09	0	Steady
Jammu & Kashmir People's Democratic Party	INDIA	8.48	▲6.11	0	Steady

=== Jharkhand (14) ===
BJP (8)	JMM (3)	INC (2)	AJSU (1)

Party	Alliance	Vote Share %	Change	Seats won	Changes
Bharatiya Janata Party	NDA	44.60	▼6.36	8	▼3
Jharkhand Mukti Morcha	INDIA	14.60	▲3.09	3	▲2
Indian National Congress	INDIA	19.19	▲3.56	2	▲1
All Jharkhand Students Union	NDA	2.62	▼1.71	1	Steady

=== Karnataka (28) ===
BJP (17)	INC (9)	JDS (2)

Party	Alliance	Vote Share %	Change	Seats won	Changes
Bharatiya Janata Party	NDA	46.06	▼5.32	17	▼8
Indian National Congress	INDIA	45.43	▲13.55	9	▲8
Janata Dal	NDA	5.60	▼4.07	2	▲1

=== Kerala (20) ===
INC (14)	IUML (2)	CPM (1)	BJP (1)	KEC (1)	RSP (1)

Party	Alliance	Vote Share %	Change	Seats won	Changes
Indian National Congress	INDIA (UDF)	35.06	▼2.40	14	▼1
Indian Union Muslim League	INDIA (UDF)	6.07	▲0.59	2	Steady
Communist Party of India (Marxist)	INDIA (LDF)	25.82	▼0.15	1	Steady
Bharatiya Janata Party	NDA	16.68	▲3.68	1	▲1
Kerala Congress	INDIA (UDF)	1.84	▲1.08	1	▲1
Revolutionary Socialist Party	INDIA (UDF)	2.24	▼0.22%	1	Steady
Communist Party of India	INDIA (LDF)	6.14	▲0.06	0	Steady
Kerala Congress (M)	INDIA (LDF)	1.38	▼0.70%	0	▼1
Bharath Dharma Jana Sena	NDA	2.56	▲0.68%	0	Steady

=== Ladakh (1) ===
IND (1)

Party	Alliance	Vote Share %	Change	Seats won	Changes
Independent	None	48.15	New	1	▲1
Indian National Congress	INDIA	27.59	▲10.79	0	Steady
Bharatiya Janata Party	NDA	23.58	▼10.36	0	▼1

=== Lakshadweep (1) ===
INC (1)

Party	Alliance	Vote Share %	Change	Seats won	Changes
Indian National Congress	INDIA	52.24	▲5.38	1	▲1
Nationalist Congress Party (Sharadchandra Pawar)	INDIA	46.96	New	0	New
Nationalist Congress Party	NDA	0.41	▼48.2	0	▼1

=== Madhya Pradesh (29) ===
BJP (29)

Party	Alliance	Vote Share %	Change	Seats won	Changes
Bharatiya Janata Party	NDA	59.27	▲1.27	29	▲1
Indian National Congress	INDIA	32.44	▼2.06	0	▼1

=== Maharashtra (48) ===
INC (13)	BJP (9)	SHS-UBT (9)	NCP-SP (8)	SHS (7)	NCP (1)	IND (1)

Party	Alliance	Vote Share %	Change	Seats won	Changes
Indian National Congress	INDIA	16.92	▲0.51	13	▲12
Bharatiya Janata Party	NDA	26.18	▼1.66	9	▼14
Shiv Sena (Uddhav Balasaheb Thackeray)	INDIA	16.72	New	9	▲9
Nationalist Congress Party (Sharadchandra Pawar)	INDIA	10.27	New	8	▲8
Shiv Sena	NDA	12.95	▼10.55	7	▼11
Nationalist Congress Party	NDA	3.60	▼12.06	1	▼3
Independent	None			1	Steady
All India Majlis-e-Ittehadul Muslimeen	None	0.61	▼0.12	0	▼1

=== Manipur (2) ===
INC (2)

Party	Alliance	Vote Share %	Change	Seats won	Changes
Indian National Congress	INDIA	47.59	▲22.96	2	▲2
Naga People's Front	NDA	18.87	▼3.61	0	▼1
Bharatiya Janata Party	NDA	16.58	▼17.64	0	▼1
Republican Party of India	None	8.58	New	0	

=== Meghalaya (2) ===
INC (1)	VPP (1)

Party	Alliance	Vote Share %	Change	Seats won	Changes
Indian National Congress	INDIA	34.05	▼14.23	1	Steady
Voice of the People Party	None	33.40	New	1	▲1
National People's Party	NDA	24.22	▲1.95	0	▼1

=== Mizoram (1) ===
ZPM (1)

Party	Alliance	Vote Share %	Change	Seats won	Changes
Zoram People's Movement	None	42.39	New	1	▲1
Mizo National Front	None	28.66	▼16.23	0	▼1
Indian National Congress	INDIA	20.08	▼23.18	0	Steady

=== Nagaland (1) ===
INC (1)

Party	Alliance	Vote Share %	Change	Seats won	Changes
Indian National Congress	INDIA	52.76	▲4.65	1	▲1
Nationalist Democratic Progressive Party	NDA	46.24	▼3.49	0	▼1

=== Odisha (21) ===
BJP (20)	INC (1)

Party	Alliance	Vote Share %	Change	Seats won	Changes
Bharatiya Janata Party	NDA	45.34	▲6.97	20	▲12
Indian National Congress	INDIA	12.52	▼1.29	1	Steady
Biju Janata Dal	None	37.53	▼5.23	0	▼12

=== Puducherry (1) ===
INC (1)

Party	Alliance	Vote Share %	Change	Seats won	Changes
Indian National Congress	INDIA	52.74	▼3.52	1	Steady
Bharatiya Janata Party	NDA	35.81	New	0	Steady

=== Punjab (13) ===
INC (7)	AAP (3)	IND (2)	SAD (1)

Party	Alliance	Vote Share %	Change	Seats won	Changes
Indian National Congress	INDIA	26.30	▼13.82	7	▼1
Aam Aadmi Party	INDIA	26.02	▲18.64	3	▲2
Independent	None			2	▲2
Shiromani Akali Dal	None	13.42	▼14.03	1	▼1
Bharatiya Janata Party	NDA	18.56	▲8.93	0	▼2

=== Rajasthan (25) ===
BJP (14)	INC (8)	CPM (1)	RLP (1)	BAP (1)

Party	Alliance	Vote Share %	Change	Seats won	Changes
Bharatiya Janata Party	NDA	49.24	▼9.23	14	▼10
Indian National Congress	INDIA	37.91	▲3.67	8	▲8
Communist Party of India (Marxist)	INDIA	1.97	▲1.77	1	▲1
Rashtriya Loktantrik Party	INDIA	1.80	▼0.33	1	Steady
Bharat Adivasi Party	INDIA		New	1	▲1

=== Sikkim (1) ===
SKM (1)

Party	Alliance	Vote Share %	Change	Seats won	Changes
Sikkim Krantikari Morcha	NDA	42.52	▼4.94	1	Steady
Citizen Action Party – Sikkim	None	21.71	New	0	
Sikkim Democratic Front	None	20.46	▼23.46	0	Steady
Bharatiya Janata Party	NDA	5.09	▲0.38	0	Steady

=== Tamil Nadu (39) ===
DMK (22)	INC (9)	CPM (2)	CPI (2)	VCK (2)	IUML (1)	MDMK (1)

Party	Alliance	Vote Share %	Change	Seats won	Changes
Dravida Munnetra Kazhagam	INDIA	26.93	▼5.83	22	▼2
Indian National Congress	INDIA	10.67	▼1.09	9	▲1
Communist Party of India (Marxist)	INDIA	2.52	▲0.12	2	Steady
Communist Party of India	INDIA	2.15	▼0.28	2	Steady
Viduthalai Chiruthaigal Katchi	INDIA			2	▲1
Indian Union Muslim League	INDIA	1.17	▲0.06	1	Steady
Marumalarchi Dravida Munnetra Kazhagam	INDIA			1	▲1
All India Anna Dravida Munnetra Kazhagam	AIADMK+	20.46	▲1.98	0	▼1
Bharatiya Janata Party	NDA	11.24	▲7.58	0	Steady

=== Telangana (17) ===
INC (8)	BJP (8)	AIMIM (1)

Party	Alliance	Vote Share %	Change	Seats won	Changes
Indian National Congress	INDIA	40.10	▲10.31	8	▲5
Bharatiya Janata Party	NDA	35.08	▲15.43	8	▲4
All India Majlis-e-Ittehadul Muslimeen	None	3.02	▲0.22	1	Steady
Bharat Rashtra Samithi	None	16.68	▼25.03	0	▼9

=== Tripura (2) ===
BJP (2)

Party	Alliance	Vote Share %	Change	Seats won	Changes
Bharatiya Janata Party	NDA	70.72	▲21.69	2	Steady
Communist Party of India (Marxist)	INDIA	12.44	▼4.87	0	Steady
Indian National Congress	INDIA	11.49	▼13.85	0	Steady

=== Uttar Pradesh (80) ===
SP (37)	BJP (33)	INC (6)	RLD (2)	ADS (1)	ASPKR (1)

Party	Alliance	Vote Share %	Change	Seats won	Changes
Samajwadi Party	INDIA	33.59	▲15.48	37	▲32
Bharatiya Janata Party	NDA	41.37	▼8.61	33	▼29
Indian National Congress	INDIA	9.46	▲3.10	6	▲5
Rashtriya Lok Dal	NDA	1.02	▼0.67	2	▲2
Apna Dal (Soneylal)	NDA	0.92	▼0.29	1	▼1
Aazad Samaj Party	None		New	1	Steady
Bahujan Samaj Party	None	9.39	▼10.04	0	▼10

=== Uttarakhand (5) ===
BJP (5)

Party	Alliance	Vote Share %	Change	Seats won	Changes
Bharatiya Janata Party	NDA	56.81	▼5.20	5	Steady
Indian National Congress	INDIA	32.83	▲1.43	0	Steady

=== West Bengal (42) ===
AITC (29)	BJP (12)	INC (1)

Party	Alliance	Vote Share %	Change	Seats won	Changes
All India Trinamool Congress	None	45.76	▲2.06	29	▲7
Bharatiya Janata Party	NDA	38.73	▼1.87	12	▼6
Indian National Congress	INDIA	4.68	▼1.02	1	▼1
Communist Party of India (Marxist)	INDIA	5.67	▼0.63	0	Steady

== Results by Region ==
Region	Seats			
Region	Seats	NDA	INDIA	Others
North India	126	59	61	6
West India	103	58	43	2
Central India	40	39	1	0
East India	118	72	45	1
Northeast India	25	16	7	2
South India	131	49	77	5
Total	543	293	234	16

== Results by constituency ==
State/UT	Constituency		Winner				Runner-up				Margin
State/UT	No.	Name	Candidate	Party	Votes	%	Candidate	Party	Votes	%	Margin
AP	1	Araku	Gumma Thanuja Rani	YSRCP	477,005	42.82	Kothapalli Geetha	BJP	426,425	38.28	50,580
AP	2	Srikakulam	Kinjarapu Rammohan Naidu	TDP	754,328	62.29	Tilak Perada	YSRCP	426,427	35.21	327,901
AP	3	Vizianagaram	Appalanaidu Kalisetti	TDP	743,113	58.24	Bellana Chandrasekhar	YSRCP	493,762	38.70	249,351
AP	4	Visakhapatnam	Sribharat Mathukumili	TDP	907,467	65.42	Botsa Jhansi Lakshmi	YSRCP	403,220	29.07	504,247
AP	5	Anakapalli	C. M. Ramesh	BJP	762,069	57.50	Budi Mutyala Naidu	YSRCP	465,539	35.13	296,530
AP	6	Kakinada	Tangella Uday Srinivas	JnP	729,699	54.87	Chalamalasetti Sunil	YSRCP	500,208	37.62	229,491
AP	7	Amalapuram	G M Harish	TDP	796,981	61.25	Rapaka Varaprasada Rao	YSRCP	454,785	34.95	342,196
AP	8	Rajahmundry	Daggubati Purandeshwari	BJP	726,515	54.82	Guduri Srinivas	YSRCP	487,376	36.77	239,139
AP	9	Narsapuram	Bhupathi Raju Srinivasa Varma	BJP	707,343	57.46	Guduri Umabala	YSRCP	430,541	34.98	276,802
AP	10	Eluru	Putta Mahesh Kumar	TDP	746,351	54.00	Karumuri Sunilkumar Yadav	YSRCP	564,494	40.84	181,857
AP	11	Machilipatnam	Balashowry Vallabhaneni	JnP	724,439	55.22	Simhadri Chandra Sekhar Rao	YSRCP	501,260	38.21	223,179
AP	12	Vijayawada	Kesineni Sivanath	TDP	794,154	58.21	Kesineni Srinivas	YSRCP	512,069	37.53	282,085
AP	13	Guntur	Chandra Sekhar Pemmasani	TDP	864,948	60.68	Kilari Venkata Rosaiah	YSRCP	520,253	36.50	344,695
AP	14	Narasaraopet	Lavu Srikrishna Devarayalu	TDP	807,996	53.88	Anilkumar Yadav Poluboina	YSRCP	648,267	43.23	159,729
AP	15	Bapatla	Krishna Prasad Tenneti	TDP	717,493	55.16	Nandigam Suresh	YSRCP	509,462	39.17	208,031
AP	16	Ongole	Magunta Sreenivasulu Reddy	TDP	701,894	49.35	Chevireddy Bhaskar Reddy	YSRCP	651,695	45.82	50,199
AP	17	Nandyal	Byreddy Shabari	TDP	701,131	49.92	Pocha Brahmananda Reddy	YSRCP	589,156	41.95	111,975
AP	18	Kurnool	Bastipati Nagaraju Panchalingala	TDP	658,914	49.51	B. Y. Ramaiah	YSRCP	547,616	41.15	111,298
AP	19	Anantapur	G. Lakshminarayana	TDP	768,245	53.33	Malagundla Sankaranarayana	YSRCP	579,690	40.24	188,555
AP	20	Hindupur	B. K. Parthasarathi	TDP	725,534	51.23	J. Shantha	YSRCP	593,107	41.88	132,427
AP	21	Kadapa	Y. S. Avinash Reddy	YSRCP	605,143	45.78	Chadipiralla Bhupesh Reddy	TDP	542,448	41.03	62,695
AP	22	Nellore	Vemireddy Prabhakar Reddy	TDP	766,202	55.70	V. Vijayasai Reddy	YSRCP	520,300	37.82	245,902
AP	23	Tirupati	Maddila Gurumoorthy	YSRCP	632,228	46.00	Velagapalli Varaprasad Rao	BJP	617,659	44.67	14,569
AP	24	Rajampet	P. V. Midhun Reddy	YSRCP	644,844	48.38	Nallari Kiran Kumar Reddy	BJP	568,773	42.67	76,071
AP	25	Chittoor	Daggumalla Prasada Rao	TDP	778,071	54.84	N. Reddeppa	YSRCP	557,592	39.30	220,479
AR	1	Arunachal West	Kiren Rijiju	BJP	205,417	51.68	Nabam Tuki	INC	104,679	26.33	100,738
AR	2	Arunachal East	Tapir Gao	BJP	145,581	45.70	Bosiram Siram	INC	115,160	36.15	30,421
AS	1	Kokrajhar	Joyanta Basumatary	UPPL	488,995	39.83	Kampa Borgoyari	BOPF	437,412	35.63	51,583
AS	2	Dhubri	Rakibul Hussain	INC	1,471,885	60.36	Mohammed Badruddin Ajmal	AIUDF	459,409	18.84	1,012,476
AS	3	Barpeta	Phani Bhusan Choudhury	AGP	860,113	51.54	Deep Bayan	INC	637,762	38.22	222,351
AS	4	Darrang-Udalguri	Dilip Saikia	BJP	868,387	48.57	Madhab Rajbangshi	INC	539,375	30.17	329,012
AS	5	Guwahati	Bijuli Kalita Medhi	BJP	894,887	56.67	Mira Borthakur Goswami	INC	643,797	40.77	251,090
AS	6	Diphu	Amarsing Tisso	BJP	334,620	50.20	J. I. Kathar	IND	187,017	28.06	147,603
AS	7	Karimganj	Kripanath Mallah	BJP	545,093	47.65	Hafiz Rashid Ahmed Choudhury	INC	526,733	46.05	18,360
AS	8	Silchar	Parimal Suklabaidya	BJP	652,405	60.59	Surya Kanta Sarkar	INC	388,094	36.04	264,311
AS	9	Nagaon	Pradyut Bordoloi	INC	788,850	51.29	Suresh Borah	BJP	576,619	37.49	212,231
AS	10	Kaziranga	Kamakhya Prasad Tasa	BJP	897,043	55.87	Roselina Tirkey	INC	648,096	40.37	248,947
AS	11	Sonitpur	Ranjit Dutta	BJP	775,788	61.10	Premlal Ganju	INC	414,380	32.64	361,408
AS	12	Lakhimpur	Pradan Baruah	BJP	663,122	55.52	Uday Shankar Hazarika	INC	461,865	38.67	201,257
AS	13	Dibrugarh	Sarbananda Sonowal	BJP	693,762	55.68	Lurinjyoti Gogoi	AJP	414,441	33.26	279,321
AS	14	Jorhat	Gaurav Gogoi	INC	751,771	54.61	Topon Kumar Gogoi	BJP	607,378	44.12	144,393
BR	1	Valmiki Nagar	Sunil Kumar	JD(U)	523,422	48.87	Deepak Yadav	RJD	424,747	39.65	98,675
BR	2	Paschim Champaran	Dr. Sanjay Jaiswal	BJP	580,421	53.99	Madan Mohan Tiwari	INC	443,853	41.29	136,568
BR	3	Purvi Champaran	Radha Mohan Singh	BJP	542,193	51.45	Dr Rajesh Kumar	VIP	453,906	43.07	88,287
BR	4	Sheohar	Lovely Anand	JD(U)	476,612	46.48	Ritu Jaiswal	RJD	447,469	43.64	29,143
BR	5	Sitamarhi	Devesh Chandra Thakur	JD(U)	515,719	48.57	Arjun Ray	RJD	464,363	43.73	51,356
BR	6	Madhubani	Ashok Kumar Yadav	BJP	553,428	54.96	Md Ali Ashraf Fatmi	RJD	401,483	39.87	151,945
BR	7	Jhanjharpur	Ramprit Mandal	JD(U)	533,032	50.39	Suman Kumar Mahaseth	VIP	348,863	32.98	184,169
BR	8	Supaul	Dileshwar Kamait	JD(U)	595,038	49.08	Chandrahas Chaupal	RJD	425,235	35.07	169,803
BR	9	Araria	Pradeep Kumar Singh	BJP	600,146	48.44	Shahnawaz	RJD	580,052	46.81	20,094
BR	10	Kishanganj	Mohammad Jawed	INC	402,850	35.77	Mujahid Alam	JD(U)	343,158	30.47	59,692
BR	11	Katihar	Tariq Anwar	INC	567,092	49.37	Dulal Chandra Goswami	JD(U)	517,229	45.03	49,863
BR	12	Purnia	Pappu Yadav	IND	567,556	48.43	Santosh Kumar	JD(U)	543,709	46.39	23,847
BR	13	Madhepura	Dinesh Chandra Yadav	JD(U)	640,649	54.43	Da Kumar Chandradeep	RJD	466,115	39.60	174,534
BR	14	Darbhanga	Gopal Jee Thakur	BJP	566,630	56.65	Lalit Kumar Yadav	RJD	388,474	38.84	178,156
BR	15	Muzaffarpur	Raj Bhushan Choudhary	BJP	619,749	56.09	Ajay Nishad	INC	384,822	34.83	234,927
BR	16	Vaishali	Veena Devi	LJPRV	567,043	49.54	Vijay Kumar Shukla	RJD	477,409	41.71	89,634
BR	17	Gopalganj	Dr. Alok Kumar Suman	JD(U)	511,866	50.17	Chanchal Paswan	VIP	384,686	37.71	127,180
BR	18	Siwan	Vijaylakshmi Devi	JD(U)	386,508	39.80	Hena Shahab	IND	293,651	30.24	92,857
BR	19	Maharajganj	Janardan Singh Sigriwal	BJP	529,533	53.36	Aakash Kumar Singh	INC	426,882	43.01	102,651
BR	20	Saran	Rajiv Pratap Rudy	BJP	471,752	46.70	Rohini Acharya	RJD	458,091	45.35	13,661
BR	21	Hajipur	Chirag Paswan	LJPRV	615,718	55.05	Shiv Chandra Ram	RJD	445,613	39.84	170,105
BR	22	Ujiarpur	Nityanand Rai	BJP	515,965	50.64	Alok Kumar Mehta	RJD	455,863	44.75	60,102
BR	23	Samastipur	Shambhavi	LJPRV	579,786	54.60	Sunny Hazari	INC	392,535	36.96	187,251
BR	24	Begusarai	Giriraj Singh	BJP	649,331	51.04	Abdhesh Kumar Roy	CPI	567,851	44.63	81,480
BR	25	Khagaria	Rajesh Verma	LJPRV	538,657	52.26	Sanjay Kumar	CPI(M)	377,526	36.63	161,131
BR	26	Bhagalpur	Ajay Kumar Mandal	JD(U)	536,031	51.93	Ajeet Sharma	INC	431,163	41.77	104,868
BR	27	Banka	Giridhari Yadav	JD(U)	506,678	51.74	Jai Prakash Narayan Yadav	RJD	402,834	41.14	103,844
BR	28	Munger	Lalan Singh	JD(U)	550,146	49.25	Kumari Anita	RJD	469,276	42.01	80,870
BR	29	Nalanda	Kaushalendra Kumar	JD(U)	559,422	49.72	Dr. Sandeep Saurav	CPI(ML)L	390,308	34.69	169,114
BR	30	Patna Sahib	Ravi Shankar Prasad	BJP	588,270	54.98	Anshul Avijit	INC	434,424	40.60	153,846
BR	31	Patliputra	Misha Bharti	RJD	613,283	50.08	Ram Kripal Yadav	BJP	528,109	43.13	85,174
BR	32	Arrah	Sudama Prasad	CPI(ML)L	529,382	49.04	R. K. Singh	BJP	469,574	43.50	59,808
BR	33	Buxar	Sudhakar Singh	RJD	438,345	41.19	Mithilesh Tiwari	BJP	408,254	38.36	30,091
BR	34	Sasaram	Manoj Kumar	INC	513,004	47.51	Shivesh Kumar	BJP	493,847	45.73	19,157
BR	35	Karakat	Raja Ram Singh	CPI(ML)L	380,581	37.68	Pawan Singh	IND	274,723	27.20	105,858
BR	36	Jahanabad	Surendra Prasad Yadav	RJD	443,035	48.46	Chandeshwar Prasad	JD(U)	300,444	32.86	142,591
BR	37	Aurangabad	Abhay Kumar Sinha	RJD	465,567	50.43	Sushil Kumar Singh	BJP	386,456	41.86	79,111
BR	38	Gaya	Jitan Ram Manjhi	HAMS	494,960	52.30	Kumar Sarvjeet	RJD	393,148	41.54	101,812
BR	39	Nawada	Vivek Thakur	BJP	410,608	47.90	Shrawan Kumar	RJD	342,938	40.00	67,670
BR	40	Jamui	Arun Bharti	LJPRV	509,046	53.41	Archana Kumari	RJD	396,564	41.61	112,482
CG	1	Surguja	Chintamani Maharaj	BJP	713,200	49.97	Shashi Singh Koram	INC	648,378	45.43	64,822
CG	2	Raigarh	Radheshyam Rathiya	BJP	808,275	56.21	Dr. Menka Devi Singh	INC	567,884	39.49	240,391
CG	3	Janjgir-Champa	Kamlesh Jangde	BJP	678,199	48.89	Dr. Shivkumar Dahariya	INC	618,199	44.57	60,000
CG	4	Korba	Jyotsna Charandas Mahant	INC	570,182	46.77	Saroj Pandey	BJP	526,899	43.22	43,283
CG	5	Bilaspur	Tokhan Sahu	BJP	724,937	53.36	Devendra Yadav	INC	560,379	41.25	164,558
CG	6	Rajnandgaon	Santosh Pandey	BJP	712,057	49.58	Bhupesh Baghel	INC	667,646	46.49	44,411
CG	7	Durg	Vijay Baghel	BJP	956,497	62.22	Rajendra Sahu	INC	518,271	33.72	438,226
CG	8	Raipur	Brijmohan Agrawal	BJP	1,050,351	66.38	Vikas Upadhyay	INC	475,066	30.02	575,285
CG	9	Mahasamund	Roop Kumari Choudhary	BJP	703,659	53.22	Tamradhwaj Sahu	INC	558,203	42.22	145,456
CG	10	Bastar	Mahesh Kashyap	BJP	458,398	47.23	Kawasi Lakhma	INC	403,153	41.53	55,245
CG	11	Kanker	Bhojraj Nag	BJP	597,624	47.93	Biresh Thakur	INC	595,740	47.78	1,884
GA	1	North Goa	Shripad Yesso Naik	BJP	257,786	57.23	Ramakant Khalap	INC	141,534	31.42	116,252
GA	2	South Goa	Captain Viriato Fernandes	INC	217,836	48.88	Pallavi Shrinivas Dempo	BJP	204,301	45.84	13,535
GJ	1	Kachchh	Chavda Vinod Lakhamshi	BJP	659,574	61.28	Nitesh Parbatbhai Lalan	INC	390,792	36.30	268,782
GJ	2	Banaskantha	Geniben Nagaji Thakor	INC	671,883	49.63	Dr. Rekhaben Hiteshbhai Chaudhari	BJP	641,477	47.39	30,406
GJ	3	Patan	Dabhi Bharatsinhji Shankarji	BJP	591,947	50.32	Chandanji Talaji Thakor	INC	560,071	47.61	31,876
GJ	4	Mahesana	Haribhai Patel	BJP	686,406	64.44	Ramji Thakor	INC	358,360	33.64	328,046
GJ	5	Sabarkantha	Shobhanaben Mahendrasinh Baraiya	BJP	677,318	54.26	Chaudhari Tushar Amarsinh	INC	521,636	41.79	155,682
GJ	6	Gandhinagar	Amit Shah	BJP	1,010,972	77.78	Sonal Ramanbhai Patel	INC	266,256	20.48	744,716
GJ	7	Ahmedabad East	Hasmukhbhai Patel	BJP	770,459	68.92	Himmatsinh Prahladsinh Patel	INC	308,704	27.62	461,755
GJ	8	Ahmedabad West	Dineshbhai Makwana	BJP	611,704	64.21	Bharat Yogendra Makwana	INC	325,267	34.14	286,437
GJ	9	Surendranagar	Chandubhai Chhaganbhai Shihora	BJP	669,749	59.90	Rutvikbhai Lavjibhai Makwana	INC	408,132	36.50	261,617
GJ	10	Rajkot	Parshottambhai Rupala	BJP	857,984	68.22	Dhanani Paresh	INC	373,724	29.72	484,260
GJ	11	Porbandar	Dr. Mansukh Mandaviya	BJP	633,514	69.16	Lalit Vasoya	INC	249,902	27.28	383,612
GJ	12	Jamnagar	Poonamben Hematbhai Maadam	BJP	620,049	59.61	Advocate J. P. Maraviya	INC	382,041	36.73	238,008
GJ	13	Junagadh	Chudasama Rajeshbhai Naranbhai	BJP	584,049	55.40	Jotva Hirabhai Arjanbhai	INC	448,555	42.55	135,494
GJ	14	Amreli	Bharatbhai Manubhai Sutariya	BJP	580,872	67.15	Jenny Thummar	INC	259,804	30.03	321,068
GJ	15	Bhavnagar	Nimuben Jayantibhai Bambhaniya	BJP	716,883	69.70	Umeshbhai Naranbhai Makwana	AAP	261,594	25.44	455,289
GJ	16	Anand	Mitesh Patel	BJP	612,484	53.17	Amit Chavda	INC	522,545	45.36	89,939
GJ	17	Kheda	Devusinh Chauhan	BJP	744,435	64.34	Kalusinh Dabhi	INC	386,677	33.42	357,758
GJ	18	Panchmahal	Rajpalsinh Mahendrasinh Jadav	BJP	794,579	71.49	Gulabsinh Somsinh Chauhan	INC	285,237	25.66	509,342
GJ	19	Dahod	Jaswantsinh Sumanbhai Bhabhor	BJP	688,715	63.57	Dr. Prabhaben Taviyad	INC	355,038	32.77	333,677
GJ	20	Vadodara	Dr. Hemang Joshi	BJP	873,189	73.15	Padhiyar Mahendrasinh	INC	291,063	24.38	582,126
GJ	21	Chhota Udaipur	Jashubhai Bhilubhai Rathva	BJP	796,589	64.34	Sukhrambhai Hariyabhai Rathwa	INC	397,812	32.13	398,777
GJ	22	Bharuch	Mansukhbhai Dhanjibhai Vasava	BJP	608,157	51.73	Chaitarbhai Vasava	AAP	522,461	44.44	85,696
GJ	23	Bardoli	Parbhubhai Nagarbhai Vasava	BJP	763,950	58.15	Siddharth Chaudhary	INC	533,697	40.62	230,253
GJ	24	Surat	Mukesh Dalal	BJP	Elected unopposed						
GJ	25	Navsari	C. R. Patil	BJP	1,031,065	78.24	Naishadhbhai Desai	INC	257,514	19.54	773,551
GJ	26	Valsad	Dhaval Laxmanbhai Patel	BJP	764,226	56.90	Anantkumar Patel	INC	553,522	41.21	210,704
HR	1	Ambala	Varun Chaudhry	INC	663,657	49.52	Banto Kataria	BJP	614,621	45.86	49,036
HR	2	Kurukshetra	Naveen Jindal	BJP	542,175	45.05	Dr Sushil Gupta	AAP	513,154	42.64	29,021
HR	3	Sirsa	Selja	INC	733,823	54.34	Ashok Tanwar	BJP	465,326	34.46	268,497
HR	4	Hisar	Jai Parkash	INC	570,424	48.72	Ranjit Singh	BJP	507,043	43.31	63,381
HR	5	Karnal	Manohar Lal	BJP	739,285	55.09	Divyanshu Budhiraja	INC	506,708	37.76	232,577
HR	6	Sonipat	Satpal Brahamchari	INC	548,682	48.92	Mohan Lal Badoli	BJP	526,866	46.97	21,816
HR	7	Rohtak	Deepender Singh Hooda	INC	783,578	62.88	Dr. Arvind Kumar Sharma	BJP	438,280	35.17	345,298
HR	8	Bhiwani-Mahendragarh	Dharambir Singh	BJP	588,664	49.97	Rao Dan Singh	INC	547,154	46.44	41,510
HR	9	Gurgaon	Rao Inderjit Singh	BJP	808,336	50.69	Raj Babbar	INC	733,257	45.98	75,079
HR	10	Faridabad	Krishan Pal	BJP	788,569	53.85	Mahender Pratap Singh	INC	615,655	42.04	172,914
HP	1	Kangra	Dr Rajeev Bhardwaj	BJP	632,793	61.41	Anand Sharma	INC	380,898	36.96	251,895
HP	2	Mandi	Kangana Ranaut	BJP	537,022	53.16	Vikramaditya Singh	INC	462,267	45.76	74,755
HP	3	Hamirpur	Anurag Singh Thakur	BJP	607,068	58.26	Satpal Raizada	INC	424,711	40.76	182,357
HP	4	Shimla	Suresh Kumar Kashyap	BJP	519,748	53.91	Vinod Sultanpuri	INC	428,297	44.43	91,451
JK	1	Baramulla	Abdul Rashid Sheikh	IND	472,481	45.92	Omar Abdullah	JKN	268,339	26.08	204,142
JK	2	Srinagar	Aga Syed Ruhullah Mehdi	JKN	356,866	53.32	Waheed Ur Rehman Para	JKPDP	168,450	25.17	188,416
JK	3	Anantnag-Rajouri	Mian Altaf Ahmad	JKN	521,836	51.16	Mehbooba Mufti	JKPDP	240,042	23.54	281,794
JK	4	Udhampur	Dr. Jitendra Singh	BJP	571,076	51.88	Ch Lal Singh	INC	446,703	40.58	124,373
JK	5	Jammu	Jugal Kishore	BJP	687,588	52.99	Raman Bhalla	INC	552,090	42.55	135,498
JH	1	Rajmahal	Vijay Kumar Hansdak	JMM	613,371	51.11	Tala Marandi	BJP	435,107	36.26	178,264
JH	2	Dumka	Nalin Soren	JMM	547,370	46.40	Sita Murmu	BJP	524,843	44.49	22,527
JH	3	Godda	Nishikant Dubey	BJP	693,140	49.73	Pradeep Yadav	INC	591,327	42.42	101,813
JH	4	Chatra	Kali Charan Singh	BJP	574,556	53.30	Krishna Nand Tripathi	INC	353,597	32.81	220,959
JH	5	Kodarma	Annpurna Devi	BJP	791,657	59.62	Vinod Kumar Singh	CPI(ML)L	414,643	31.23	377,014
JH	6	Giridih	Chandra Prakash Choudhary	AJSU	451,139	35.84	Mathura Prasad Mahato	JMM	370,259	29.41	80,880
JH	7	Dhanbad	Dulu Mahato	BJP	789,172	55.55	Anupama Singh	INC	457,589	32.21	331,583
JH	8	Ranchi	Sanjay Seth	BJP	664,732	46.17	Yashaswini Sahay	INC	544,220	37.80	120,512
JH	9	Jamshedpur	Bidyut Baran Mahato	BJP	726,174	57.17	Samir Kumar Mohanty	JMM	466,392	36.72	259,782
JH	10	Singhbhum	Joba Majhi	JMM	520,164	52.88	Geeta Kora	BJP	351,762	35.76	168,402
JH	11	Khunti	Kali Charan Munda	INC	511,647	55.93	Arjun Munda	BJP	361,972	39.57	149,675
JH	12	Lohardaga	Sukhdeo Bhagat	INC	483,038	50.54	Samir Oraon	BJP	343,900	35.98	139,138
JH	13	Palamu	Vishnu Dayal Ram	BJP	770,362	56.38	Mamta Bhuiyan	RJD	481,555	35.24	288,807
JH	14	Hazaribagh	Manish Jaiswal	BJP	654,613	52.06	Jai Prakash Bhai Patel	INC	377,927	30.05	276,686
KA	1	Chikkodi	Priyanka Satish Jarkiholi	INC	713,461	51.31	Annasaheb Shankar Jolle	BJP	622,627	44.78	90,834
KA	2	Belgaum	Jagadish Shettar	BJP	762,029	55.29	Mrinal R Hebbalkar	INC	583,592	42.35	178,437
KA	3	Bagalkot	P. C. Gaddigoudar	BJP	671,039	51.06	Samyukta Shivanand Patil	INC	602,640	45.86	68,399
KA	4	Bijapur	Ramesh Jigajinagi	BJP	672,781	52.21	Raju Alagur.	INC	595,552	46.22	77,229
KA	5	Gulbarga	Radhakrishna	INC	652,321	50.10	Dr. Umesh G Jadhav	BJP	625,116	48.01	27,205
KA	6	Raichur	G. Kumar Naik	INC	670,966	52.02	Raja Amareshwara Naik.	BJP	591,185	45.84	79,781
KA	7	Bidar	Sagar Eshwar Khandre	INC	666,317	53.84	Bhagwanth Khuba	BJP	537,442	43.42	128,875
KA	8	Koppal	K. Rajashekar Basavaraj Hitnal	INC	663,511	50.06	Dr . Basavaraj. K. Sharanappa	BJP	617,154	46.56	46,357
KA	9	Bellary	E. Tukaram	INC	730,845	52.88	B. Sreeramulu	BJP	631,853	45.72	98,992
KA	10	Haveri	Basavaraj Bommai	BJP	705,538	50.94	Anandswamy Gaddadevarmath	INC	662,025	47.80	43,513
KA	11	Dharwad	Pralhad Joshi	BJP	716,231	52.65	Vinod Asooti	INC	618,907	45.50	97,324
KA	12	Uttara Kannada	Vishweshwar Hegde Kageri	BJP	782,495	62.47	Dr. Anjali Nimbalkar	INC	445,067	35.53	337,428
KA	13	Davanagere	Dr. Prabha Mallikarjun	INC	633,059	48.06	Gayithri Siddeshwara	BJP	606,965	46.08	26,094
KA	14	Shimoga	B. Y. Raghavendra	BJP	778,721	56.72	Geetha Shivarajkumar	INC	535,006	38.97	243,715
KA	15	Udupi Chikmagalur	Kota Srinivas Poojary	BJP	732,234	60.11	K. Jayaprakash Hegde	INC	473,059	38.83	259,175
KA	16	Hassan	Shreyas. M. Patel	INC	672,988	49.98	Prajwal Revanna	JD(S)	630,339	46.81	42,649
KA	17	Dakshina Kannada	Captain Brijesh Chowta	BJP	764,132	54.89	Padmaraj. R. Poojary	INC	614,924	44.17	149,208
KA	18	Chitradurga	Govind Makthappa Karjol	BJP	684,890	50.22	B. N. Chandrappa	INC	636,769	46.69	48,121
KA	19	Tumkur	V. Somanna	BJP	720,946	55.59	S. P. Muddahanumegowda	INC	545,352	42.05	175,594
KA	20	Mandya	H. D. Kumaraswamy	JD(S)	851,881	58.65	Venkataramane Gowda	INC	567,261	39.05	284,620
KA	21	Mysore	Yaduveer Krishnadatta Chamaraja Wadiyar	BJP	795,503	53.75	M. Lakshmana	INC	656,241	44.34	139,262
KA	22	Chamarajanagar	Sunil Bose	INC	751,671	55.20	Balaraj. S	BJP	562,965	41.34	188,706
KA	23	Bangalore Rural	Dr. C. N. Manjunath	BJP	1,079,002	56.53	D. K. Suresh	INC	809,355	42.40	269,647
KA	24	Bangalore North	Shobha Karandlaje	BJP	986,049	56.70	Professor M. V Rajeev Gowda	INC	726,573	41.78	259,476
KA	25	Bangalore Central	P. C. Mohan	BJP	658,915	50.52	Mansoor Ali Khan	INC	626,208	48.01	32,707
KA	26	Bangalore South	Tejasvi Surya	BJP	750,830	60.48	Sowmya Reddy	INC	473,747	38.16	277,083
KA	27	Chikkballapur	Dr. K. Sudhakar	BJP	822,619	53.97	M. S. Raksha Ramaiah	INC	659,159	43.25	163,460
KA	28	Kolar	M. Mallesh Babu	JD(S)	691,481	51.24	K V Gowtham	INC	620,093	45.95	71,388
KL	1	Kasaragod	Rajmohan Unnithan	INC	490,659	44.39	M. V Balakrishnan Master	CPI(M)	390,010	35.28	100,649
KL	2	Kannur	K. Sudhakaran	INC	518,524	49.15	M. V. Jayarajan	CPI(M)	409,542	38.82	108,982
KL	3	Vadakara	Shafi Parambil	INC	557,528	49.78	K. K. Shailaja Teacher	CPI(M)	443,022	39.55	114,506
KL	4	Wayanad	Rahul Gandhi	INC	647,445	60.08	Annie Raja	CPI	283,023	26.26	364,422
KL	5	Kozhikode	M. K. Raghavan	INC	520,421	48.02	Elamaram Kareem	CPI(M)	374,245	34.53	146,176
KL	6	Malappuram	E. T. Mohammed Basheer	IUML	644,006	59.72	V. Vaseef	CPI(M)	343,888	31.89	300,118
KL	7	Ponnani	Dr. M. P Abdussamad Samadani	IUML	562,516	55.16	K. S Hamza	CPI(M)	326,756	32.04	235,760
KL	8	Palakkad	V. K. Sreekandan	INC	421,169	41.01	A. Vijayaraghavan	CPI(M)	345,886	33.68	75,283
KL	9	Alathur	K. Radhakrishnan	CPI(M)	403,447	41.16	Ramya Haridas	INC	383,336	39.11	20,111
KL	10	Thrissur	Suresh Gopi	BJP	412,338	38.01	Adv V S Sunilkumar	CPI	337,652	31.13	74,686
KL	11	Chalakudy	Benny Behanan	INC	394,171	41.79	Prof C Raveendranath	CPI(M)	330,417	35.03	63,754
KL	12	Ernakulam	Hibi Eden	INC	482,317	53.43	K. J. Shine Teacher	CPI(M)	231,932	25.69	250,385
KL	13	Idukki	Adv. Dean Kuriakose	INC	432,372	52.02	Adv. Joice George	CPI(M)	298,645	35.93	133,727
KL	14	Kottayam	Adv K Francis George	KEC(M)	364,631	44.24	Thomas Chazhikadan	KEC(M)	277,365	33.65	87,266
KL	15	Alappuzha	K. C Venugopal	INC	404,560	38.48	A. M Ariff	CPI(M)	341,047	32.44	63,513
KL	16	Mavelikkara	Kodikunnil Suresh	INC	369,516	41.75	Adv Arun Kumar C A	CPI	358,648	40.52	10,868
KL	17	Pathanamthitta	Anto Antony	INC	367,623	40.35	Thomas Isaac	CPI(M)	301,504	33.09	66,119
KL	18	Kollam	N. K. Premachandran	RSP	443,628	48.80	M Mukesh	CPI(M)	293,326	32.26	150,302
KL	19	Attingal	Adoor Prakash	INC	328,051	33.63	Adv V Joy	CPI(M)	327,367	33.56	684
KL	20	Thiruvananthapuram	Shashi Tharoor	INC	358,155	37.45	Rajeev Chandrasekhar	BJP	342,078	35.77	16,077
MP	1	Morena	Shivmangal Singh Tomar	BJP	515,477	43.60	Neetu Satyapal Singh Sikarwar	INC	462,947	39.15	52,530
MP	2	Bhind	Sandhya Ray	BJP	537,065	51.52	Phool Singh Baraiya	INC	472,225	45.30	64,840
MP	3	Gwalior	Bharat Singh Kushwah	BJP	671,535	50.12	Praveen Pathak	INC	601,325	44.88	70,210
MP	4	Guna	Jyotiraditya M. Scindia	BJP	923,302	67.66	Yadvendra Rao Deshraj Singh	INC	382,373	28.02	540,929
MP	5	Sagar	Dr. Lata Wankhede	BJP	787,979	68.95	Chandra Bhusan Singh Bundela	INC	316,757	27.72	471,222
MP	6	Tikamgarh	Dr. Virendra Kumar	BJP	715,050	65.87	Khuman Urf Pankaj Ahirwar	INC	311,738	28.72	403,312
MP	7	Damoh	Rahul Singh Lodhi	BJP	709,768	65.65	Tarbar Singh Lodhi	INC	303,342	28.06	406,426
MP	8	Khajuraho	Vishnu Datt Sharma	BJP	772,774	68.73	Kamlesh Kumar	BSP	231,545	20.59	541,229
MP	9	Satna	Ganesh Singh	BJP	459,728	43.52	Dabbu Siddharth Kushwaha	INC	374,779	35.48	84,949
MP	10	Rewa	Janardan Mishra	BJP	477,459	52.40	Neelam Abhay Mishra	INC	284,085	31.18	193,374
MP	11	Sidhi	Dr. Rajesh Mishra	BJP	583,559	51.05	Kamleshwar Indrajit Kumar	INC	377,143	32.99	206,416
MP	12	Shahdol	Himadri Singh	BJP	711,143	62.79	Phunde Lal Singh Marko	INC	313,803	27.71	397,340
MP	13	Jabalpur	Ashish Dubey	BJP	790,133	68.50	Dinesh Yadav	INC	303,459	26.31	486,674
MP	14	Mandla	Faggan Singh Kulaste	BJP	751,375	49.54	Omkar Singh Markam	INC	647,529	42.69	103,846
MP	15	Balaghat	Bharti Pardhi	BJP	712,660	51.99	Samrat Ashok Singh Saraswar	INC	538,148	39.26	174,512
MP	16	Chhindwara	Bunty Vivek Sahu	BJP	644,738	49.79	Nakul Nath	INC	531,120	41.02	113,618
MP	17	Hoshangabad	Darshan Singh Choudhary	BJP	812,147	65.77	Sanjay Sharma Sanju Bhaiya	INC	380,451	30.81	431,696
MP	18	Vidisha	Shivraj Singh Chouhan	BJP	1,116,460	77.19	Pratapbhanu Sharma	INC	295,052	20.40	821,408
MP	19	Bhopal	Alok Sharma	BJP	981,109	65.77	Advocate Arun Shrivastava	INC	479,610	32.15	501,499
MP	20	Rajgarh	Rodmal Nagar	BJP	758,743	53.37	Digvijaya Singh	INC	612,654	43.09	146,089
MP	21	Dewas	Mahendra Singh Solanky	BJP	928,941	63.68	Rajendra Radhakishan Malviya	INC	503,716	34.53	425,225
MP	22	Ujjain	Anil Firojiya	BJP	836,104	63.38	Mahesh Parmar	INC	460,244	34.89	375,860
MP	23	Mandsour	Sudheer Gupta	BJP	945,761	66.52	Dilip Singh Gurjar	INC	445,106	31.31	500,655
MP	24	Ratlam	Anita Nagarsingh Chouhan	BJP	795,863	53.03	Kantilal Bhuria	INC	588,631	39.22	207,232
MP	25	Dhar	Savitri Thakur	BJP	794,449	56.37	Radheshyam Muvel	INC	575,784	40.85	218,665
MP	26	Indore	Shankar Lalwani	BJP	1,226,751	91.32	NOTA	NOTA	218,674	16.28	1,008,077
MP	27	Khargone	Gajendra Singh Patel	BJP	819,863	53.22	Porlal Batha Kharte	INC	684,845	44.46	135,018
MP	28	Khandwa	Gyaneshwar Patil	BJP	862,679	57.52	Narendra Patel	INC	592,708	39.52	269,971
MP	29	Betul	Durgadas Uikey	BJP	848,236	61.66	Ramu Tekam	INC	468,475	34.05	379,761
MH	1	Nandurbar	Adv Gowaal Kagada Padavi	INC	745,998	54.08	Dr Heena Vijaykumar Gavit	BJP	586,878	42.54	159,120
MH	2	Dhule	Bachhav Shobha Dinesh	INC	583,866	48.07	Bhamre Subhash Ramrao	BJP	580,035	47.76	3,831
MH	3	Jalgaon	Smita Uday Wagh	BJP	674,428	58.36	Karan Balasaheb Patil - Pawar	SHS(UBT)	422,834	36.59	251,594
MH	4	Raver	Raksha Khadse	BJP	630,879	54.03	Shriram Dayaram Patil	NCP(SP)	358,696	30.72	272,183
MH	5	Buldhana	Prataprao Jadhav	SHS	349,867	31.64	Narendra Dagdu Khedekar	SHS(UBT)	320,388	28.98	29,479
MH	6	Akola	Anup Sanjay Dhotre	BJP	457,030	39.15	Abhay Kashinath Patil	INC	416,404	35.67	40,626
MH	7	Amravati	Balwant Baswant Wankhade	INC	526,271	44.94	Navneet Kaur Rana	BJP	506,540	43.26	19,731
MH	8	Wardha	Amar Sharadrao Kale	NCP(SP)	533,106	48.89	Ramdas Chandrabhan Tadas	BJP	451,458	41.40	81,648
MH	9	Ramtek	Shyamkumar Barve	INC	613,025	49.25	Raju Deonath Parve	SHS	536,257	43.08	76,768
MH	10	Nagpur	Nitin Jairam Gadkari	BJP	655,027	54.32	Vikas Thakre	INC	517,424	42.91	137,603
MH	11	Bhandara Gondiya	Dr. Prashant Padole	INC	587,413	47.96	Sunil Baburao Mendhe	BJP	550,033	44.91	37,380
MH	12	Gadchiroli - Chimur	Dr. Kirsan Namdeo	INC	617,792	53.73	Ashok Mahadeorao Nete	BJP	476,096	41.41	141,696
MH	13	Chandrapur	Pratibha Dhanorkar	INC	718,410	58.39	Sudhir Mungantiwar	BJP	458,004	37.22	260,406
MH	14	Yavatmal- Washim	Sanjay Uttamrao Deshmukh	SHS(UBT)	594,807	48.91	Rajshritai Hemant Patil	SHS	500,334	41.14	94,473
MH	15	Hingoli	Nagesh Ashtikar	SHS(UBT)	492,535	42.60	Baburao Kadam Kohalikar	SHS	383,933	33.21	108,602
MH	16	Nanded	Vasantrao Chavan	INC	528,894	47.03	Chikhalikar Prataprao Govindrao	BJP	469,452	41.74	59,442
MH	17	Parbhani	Jadhav Sanjay Haribhau	SHS(UBT)	601,343	45.29	Jankar Mahadev Jagannath	RSPS	467,282	35.19	134,061
MH	18	Jalna	Kalyan Vaijinathrao Kale	INC	607,897	44.70	Raosaheb Danve	BJP	497,939	36.62	109,958
MH	19	Aurangabad	Sandipanrao Bhumare	SHS	476,130	36.73	Imtiaz Jaleel	AIMIM	341,480	26.34	134,650
MH	20	Dindori	Bhaskar Murlidhar Bhagare	NCP(SP)	577,339	46.84	Dr. Bharati Pravin Pawar	BJP	464,140	37.65	113,199
MH	21	Nashik	Rajabhau Waje	SHS(UBT)	616,729	50.10	Godse Hemant Tukaram	SHS	454,728	36.94	162,001
MH	22	Palghar	Dr. Hemant Savara	BJP	601,244	44.45	Bharti Bharat Kamdi	SHS(UBT)	417,938	30.90	183,306
MH	23	Bhiwandi	Suresh Mhatre	NCP(SP)	499,464	40.15	Kapil Moreshwar Patil	BJP	433,343	34.83	66,121
MH	24	Kalyan	Dr. Shrikant Shinde	SHS	589,636	57.02	Vaishali Darekar - Rane	SHS(UBT)	380,492	36.80	209,144
MH	25	Thane	Naresh Mhaske	SHS	734,231	56.87	Rajan Baburao Vichare	SHS(UBT)	517,220	40.06	217,011
MH	26	Mumbai North	Piyush Goyal	BJP	680,146	66.54	Bhushan Patil	INC	322,538	31.55	357,608
MH	27	Mumbai North West	Ravindra Dattaram Waikar	SHS	452,644	48.16	Amol Gajanan Kirtikar	SHS(UBT)	452,596	48.16	48
MH	28	Mumbai North East	Sanjay Dina Patil	SHS(UBT)	450,937	49.21	Mihir Chandrakant Kotecha	BJP	421,076	45.95	29,861
MH	29	Mumbai North Central	Varsha Gaikwad	INC	445,545	49.46	Ujjwal Nikam	BJP	429,031	47.63	16,514
MH	30	Mumbai South Central	Anil Yeshwant Desai	SHS(UBT)	395,138	50.59	Rahul Ramesh Shewale	SHS	341,754	43.75	53,384
MH	31	Mumbai South	Arvind Ganpat Sawant	SHS(UBT)	395,655	52.08	Yamini Yashwant Jadhav	SHS	342,982	45.15	52,673
MH	32	Raigad	Sunil Tatkare	NCP	508,352	51.56	Anant Geete	SHS(UBT)	425,568	43.16	82,784
MH	33	Maval	Shrirang Barne	SHS	692,832	49.39	Sanjog Bhiku Waghere Patil	SHS(UBT)	596,217	42.51	96,615
MH	34	Pune	Murlidhar Mohol	BJP	584,728	53.30	Dhangekar Ravindra Hemraj	INC	461,690	42.08	123,038
MH	35	Baramati	Supriya Sule	NCP(SP)	732,312	52.19	Sunetra Pawar	NCP	573,979	40.91	158,333
MH	36	Shirur	Dr. Amol Ramsing Kolhe	NCP(SP)	698,692	51.19	Adhalrao Shivaji Dattatrey	NCP	557,741	40.87	140,951
MH	37	Ahmednagar	Nilesh Dnyandev Lanke	NCP(SP)	624,797	47.25	Sujay Vikhe Patil	BJP	595,868	45.07	28,929
MH	38	Shirdi	Bhausaheb Rajaram Wakchaure	SHS(UBT)	476,900	45.23	Lokhande Sadashiv Kisan	SHS	426,371	40.43	50,529
MH	39	Beed	Bajrang Manohar Sonwane	NCP(SP)	683,950	44.99	Pankaja Munde	BJP	677,397	44.56	6,553
MH	40	Osmanabad	Omprakash Rajenimbalkar	SHS(UBT)	748,752	58.64	Archana Ranajagjitsinh Patil	NCP	418,906	32.81	329,846
MH	41	Latur	Dr. Kalge Shivaji Bandappa	INC	609,021	49.29	Sudhakar Tukaram Shrangare	BJP	547,140	44.28	61,881
MH	42	Solapur	Praniti Sushilkumar Shinde	INC	620,225	51.61	Ram Vitthal Satpute	BJP	546,028	45.44	74,197
MH	43	Madha	Dhairyasheel Mohite-Patil	NCP(SP)	622,213	49.00	Ranjeetsingh Nimbalkar	BJP	501,376	39.49	120,837
MH	44	Sangli	Vishal Prakashbapu Patil	IND	571,666	49.19	Sanjay Patil	BJP	471,613	40.58	100,053
MH	45	Satara	Udayanraje Bhonsle	BJP	571,134	47.89	Shashikant Jayvantrao Shinde	NCP(SP)	538,363	45.15	32,771
MH	46	Ratnagiri- Sindhudurg	Narayan Tatu Rane	BJP	448,514	49.70	Vinayak Bhaurao Raut	SHS(UBT)	400,656	44.40	47,858
MH	47	Kolhapur	Chhatrapati Shahu Shahaji	INC	754,522	54.39	Sanjay Sadashivrao Mandlik	SHS	599,558	43.22	154,964
MH	48	Hatkanangale	Dhairyasheel Sambhajirao Mane	SHS	520,190	40.30	Satyajeet Sarudkar	SHS(UBT)	506,764	39.26	13,426
MN	1	Inner Manipur	Angomcha Bimol Akoijam	INC	374,017	47.16	T. Basanta Kumar Singh	BJP	264,216	33.31	109,801
MN	2	Outer Manipur	Alfred Kan-Ngram Arthur	INC	384,954	48.76	Kachui Timothy Zimik	NPF	299,536	37.94	85,418
ML	1	Shillong	Ricky A. J. Syngkon	VPP	571,078	55.61	Vincent H. Pala	INC	199,168	19.40	371,910
ML	2	Tura	Saleng A. Sangma	INC	383,919	57.45	Agatha Sangma	NPP	228,678	34.22	155,241
MZ	1	Mizoram	Richard Vanlalhmangaiha	ZPM	208,552	42.61	K Vanlalvena	MNF	140,264	28.66	68,288
NL	1	Nagaland	S. Supongmeren Jamir	INC	401,951	52.95	Dr Chumben Murry	NDPP	350,967	46.23	50,984
OD	1	Bargarh	Pradeep Purohit	BJP	716,359	55.22	Parinita Mishra	BJD	464,692	35.82	251,667
OD	2	Sundargarh	Jual Oram	BJP	494,282	43.44	Dilip Tirkey	BJD	355,474	31.24	138,808
OD	3	Sambalpur	Dharmendra Pradhan	BJP	592,162	50.00	Pranab Prakash Das	BJD	472,326	39.88	119,836
OD	4	Keonjhar	Ananta Nayak	BJP	573,923	46.59	Dhanurjaya Sidu	BJD	476,881	38.71	97,042
OD	5	Mayurbhanj	Naba Charan Majhi	BJP	585,971	50.77	Sudam Marndi	BJD	366,637	31.77	219,334
OD	6	Balasore	Pratap Chandra Sarangi	BJP	563,486	45.76	Lekhasri Samantsinghar	BJD	416,335	33.81	147,151
OD	7	Bhadrak	Avimanyu Sethi	BJP	573,319	44.38	Manjulata Mandal	BJD	481,775	37.29	91,544
OD	8	Jajpur	Rabindra Narayan Behera	BJP	534,239	46.28	Sarmistha Sethi	BJD	532,652	46.14	1,587
OD	9	Dhenkanal	Rudra Narayan Pany	BJP	598,721	50.83	Abinash Samal	BJD	522,154	44.33	76,567
OD	10	Bolangir	Sangeeta Kumari Singh Deo	BJP	617,744	44.63	Surendra Singh Bhoi	BJD	485,080	35.04	132,664
OD	11	Kalahandi	Malvika Devi	BJP	544,303	41.41	Lambodar Nial	BJD	410,490	31.23	133,813
OD	12	Nabarangpur	Balabhadra Majhi	BJP	481,396	40.14	Pradeep Kumar Majhi	BJD	393,860	32.84	87,536
OD	13	Kandhamal	Sukanta Kumar Panigrahi	BJP	416,415	42.48	Achyuta Samanta	BJD	395,044	40.30	21,371
OD	14	Cuttack	Bhartruhari Mahtab	BJP	531,601	47.78	Santrupt Misra	BJD	474,524	42.65	57,077
OD	15	Kendrapara	Baijayant Panda	BJP	615,705	48.43	Anshuman Mohanty	BJD	549,169	43.20	66,536
OD	16	Jagatsinghpur	Bibhu Prasad Tarai	BJP	589,093	45.97	Dr. Rajashree Mallick	BJD	548,397	42.80	40,696
OD	17	Puri	Sambit Patra	BJP	629,330	52.91	Arup Mohan Patnaik	BJD	524,621	44.11	104,709
OD	18	Bhubaneswar	Aparajita Sarangi	BJP	512,519	47.72	Manmath Kumar Routray	BJD	477,367	44.45	35,152
OD	19	Aska	Anita Subhadarshini	BJP	494,226	49.62	Ranjita Sahu	BJD	394,252	39.58	99,974
OD	20	Berhampur	Dr. Pradeep Kumar Panigrahy	BJP	513,102	49.96	Bhrugu Baxipatra	BJD	347,626	33.85	165,476
OD	21	Koraput	Saptagiri Sankar Ulaka	INC	471,046	42.42	Kausalya Hikaka	BJD	323,318	29.11	147,728
PB	1	Gurdaspur	Sukhjinder Singh Randhawa	INC	364,043	33.88	Dinesh Singh Babbu	BJP	281,182	26.17	82,861
PB	2	Amritsar	Gurjeet Singh Aujla	INC	255,181	28.29	Kuldeep Singh Dhaliwal	AAP	214,880	23.82	40,301
PB	3	Khadoor Sahib	Amritpal Singh	IND	404,430	38.75	Kulbir Singh Zira	INC	207,310	19.86	197,120
PB	4	Jalandhar	Charanjit Singh Channi	INC	390,053	39.62	Sushil Kumar Rinku	BJP	214,060	21.75	175,993
PB	5	Hoshiarpur	Dr. Raj Kumar Chabbewal	AAP	303,859	32.22	Yamini Gomar	INC	259,748	27.55	44,111
PB	6	Anandpur Sahib	Malvinder Singh Kang	AAP	313,217	29.25	Vijay Inder Singla	INC	302,371	28.24	10,846
PB	7	Ludhiana	Amrinder Singh Raja Warring	INC	322,224	30.57	Ravneet Singh Bittu	BJP	301,282	28.58	20,942
PB	8	Fatehgarh Sahib	Amar Singh	INC	332,591	34.46	Gurpreet Singh Gp	AAP	298,389	30.92	34,202
PB	9	Faridkot	Sarabjeet Singh Khalsa	IND	298,062	29.50	Karamjit Singh Anmol	AAP	228,009	22.57	70,053
PB	10	Firozpur	Sher Singh Ghubaya	INC	266,626	23.83	Jagdeep Singh Kaka Brar	AAP	263,384	23.54	3,242
PB	11	Bathinda	Harsimrat Kaur Badal	SAD	376,558	32.85	Gurmeet Singh Khudian	AAP	326,902	28.52	49,656
PB	12	Sangrur	Gurmeet Singh Meet Hayer	AAP	364,085	36.20	Sukhpal Singh Khaira	INC	191,525	19.04	172,560
PB	13	Patiala	Dr. Dharamvir Gandhi	INC	305,616	26.69	Dr Balbir Singh	AAP	290,785	25.39	14,831
RJ	1	Ganganagar	Kuldeep Indora	INC	726,492	51.88	Priyanka Balan Meghwal	BJP	638,339	45.58	88,153
RJ	2	Bikaner	Arjun Ram Meghwal	BJP	566,737	51.25	Govindram Meghwal	INC	511,026	46.22	55,711
RJ	3	Churu	Rahul Kaswan	INC	728,211	51.36	Devendra Jhajharia	BJP	655,474	46.23	72,737
RJ	4	Jhunjhunu	Brijendra Singh Ola	INC	553,168	49.73	Shubhkaran Choudhary	BJP	534,933	48.09	18,235
RJ	5	Sikar	Amra Ram	CPI(M)	659,300	50.97	Sumedhanand Saraswati	BJP	586,404	45.33	72,896
RJ	6	Jaipur Rural	Rao Rajendra Singh	BJP	617,877	49.25	Anil Chopra	INC	616,262	49.12	1,615
RJ	7	Jaipur	Manju Sharma	BJP	886,850	61.04	Pratap Singh Khachariyawas	INC	555,083	38.21	331,767
RJ	8	Alwar	Bhupender Yadav	BJP	631,992	50.66	Lalit Yadav	INC	583,710	46.79	48,282
RJ	9	Bharatpur	Sanjana Jatav	INC	579,890	51.43	Ramswaroop Koli	BJP	527,907	46.82	51,983
RJ	10	Karauli-Dholpur	Bhajan Lal Jatav	INC	530,011	54.05	Indu Devi	BJP	431,066	43.96	98,945
RJ	11	Dausa	Murari Lal Meena	INC	646,266	60.57	Kanhaiya Lal Meena	BJP	408,926	38.33	237,340
RJ	12	Tonk-Sawai Madhopur	Harish Chandra Meena	INC	623,763	51.19	Sukhbir Singh Jaunapuria	BJP	558,814	45.86	64,949
RJ	13	Ajmer	Bhagirath Choudhary	BJP	747,462	62.82	Ramchandra Choudhary	INC	417,471	35.09	329,991
RJ	14	Nagaur	Hanuman Beniwal	RLTP	596,955	48.54	Jyoti Mirdha	BJP	554,730	45.11	42,225
RJ	15	Pali	P. P. Chaudhary	BJP	757,389	56.52	Sangeeta Beniwal	INC	512,038	38.21	245,351
RJ	16	Jodhpur	Gajendra Singh Shekhawat	BJP	730,056	53.16	Karan Singh Uchiyarda	INC	614,379	44.74	115,677
RJ	17	Barmer	Ummeda Ram Beniwal	INC	704,676	42.19	Ravindra Singh Bhati	IND	586,500	35.12	118,176
RJ	18	Jalore	Lumbaram Choudhary	BJP	796,783	55.62	Vaibhav Gehlot	INC	595,240	41.55	201,543
RJ	19	Udaipur	Manna Lal Rawat	BJP	738,286	50.04	Tarachand Meena	INC	476,678	32.31	261,608
RJ	20	Banswara	Rajkumar Roat	BAP	820,831	50.80	Mahendrajeetsingh Malviya	BJP	573,777	35.51	247,054
RJ	21	Chittorgarh	Chandra Prakash Joshi	BJP	888,202	59.49	Anjana Udailal	INC	498,325	33.37	389,877
RJ	22	Rajsamand	Mahima Kumari Mewar	BJP	781,203	65.06	Dr. Damodar Gurjar	INC	388,980	32.40	392,223
RJ	23	Bhilwara	Damodar Agarwal	BJP	807,640	62.56	C. P. Joshi	INC	453,034	35.09	354,606
RJ	24	Kota	Om Birla	BJP	750,496	50.37	Prahlad Gunjal	INC	708,522	47.56	41,974
RJ	25	Jhalawar-Baran	Dushyant Singh	BJP	865,376	61.58	Urmila Jain "Bhaya"	INC	494,387	35.18	370,989
SK	1	Sikkim	Indra Hang Subba	SKM	164,396	42.99	Bharat Basnett	CAP(S)	83,566	21.85	80,830
TN	1	Tiruvallur	Sasikanth Senthil	INC	796,956	56.97	Balaganapathy V. Pon	BJP	224,801	16.07	572,155
TN	2	Chennai North	Kalanidhi Veeraswamy	DMK	497,333	55.93	R. Manohar	AIADMK	158,111	17.78	339,222
TN	3	Chennai South	Thamizhachi Thangapandian	DMK	516,628	47.67	Tamilisai Soundararajan	BJP	290,683	26.82	225,945
TN	4	Chennai Central	Dayanidhi Maran	DMK	413,848	57.53	Vinoj P Selvam	BJP	169,159	23.51	244,689
TN	5	Sriperumbudur	T. R. Baalu	DMK	758,611	53.63	G Premkumar	AIADMK	271,582	19.20	487,029
TN	6	Kancheepuram	G. Selvam	DMK	586,044	47.16	E. Rajasekar	AIADMK	364,571	29.34	221,473
TN	7	Arakkonam	S. Jagathratchakan	DMK	563,216	48.92	L. Vijayan	AIADMK	256,657	22.29	306,559
TN	8	Vellore	D. M. Kathir Anand	DMK	568,692	50.74	A. C. Shanmugam	BJP	352,990	31.50	215,702
TN	9	Krishnagiri	K. Gopinath	INC	492,883	42.67	V. Jayaprakash	AIADMK	300,397	26.00	192,486
TN	10	Dharmapuri	A. Mani	DMK	432,667	34.93	Anbumani Ramadoss	PMK	411,367	33.21	21,300
TN	11	Tiruvannamalai	C. N. Annadurai	DMK	547,379	48.26	M. Kaliyaperumal	AIADMK	313,448	27.63	233,931
TN	12	Arani	M. S. Tharaniventhan	DMK	500,099	44.21	G. V. Gajendran	AIADMK	291,333	25.76	208,766
TN	13	Viluppuram	D. Ravikumar	VCK	477,033	41.71	J. Bhagyaraj	AIADMK	406,330	35.53	70,703
TN	14	Kallakurichi	D. Malaiyarasan	DMK	561,589	45.25	R. Kumaraguru	AIADMK	507,805	40.92	53,784
TN	15	Salem	T. M. Selvaganapathi	DMK	566,085	43.88	P. Vignesh	AIADMK	495,728	38.43	70,357
TN	16	Namakkal	V. S. Matheswaran	DMK	462,036	40.77	S. Tamilmani	AIADMK	432,924	38.20	29,112
TN	17	Erode	K. E. Prakash	DMK	562,339	52.10	Ashok Kumar	AIADMK	325,773	30.18	236,566
TN	18	Tiruppur	K. Subbarayan	CPI	472,739	42.03	P. Arunachalam	AIADMK	346,811	30.83	125,928
TN	19	Nilgiris	A. Raja	DMK	473,212	47.04	L. Murugan	BJP	232,627	23.13	240,585
TN	20	Coimbatore	P. Ganapathy Rajkumar	DMK	568,200	41.75	K. Annamalai	BJP	450,132	33.07	118,068
TN	21	Pollachi	K. Eswarasamy	DMK	533,377	47.99	A. Karthikeyan	AIADMK	281,335	25.31	252,042
TN	22	Dindigul	R. Sachithanantham	CPI(M)	670,149	59.44	M. A. Mohamed Mubarak	AIADMK	226,328	20.07	443,821
TN	23	Karur	S. Jothimani	INC	534,906	47.60	L. Thangavel	AIADMK	368,090	32.75	166,816
TN	24	Tiruchirappalli	Durai Vaiko	MDMK	542,213	52.03	P. Karuppaiah	AIADMK	229,119	21.99	313,094
TN	25	Perambalur	Arun Nehru	DMK	603,209	53.91	N. D. Chandramohan	AIADMK	214,102	19.13	389,107
TN	26	Cuddalore	M. K. Vishnuprasad	INC	455,053	44.43	P. Sivakozhundu	DMDK	269,157	26.28	185,896
TN	27	Chidambaram	Thol. Thirumaavalavan	VCK	505,084	43.61	M. Chandrahasan	AIADMK	401,530	34.67	103,554
TN	28	Mayiladuthurai	R. Sudha	INC	518,459	48.05	P. Babu	AIADMK	247,276	22.92	271,183
TN	29	Nagapattinam	V. Selvaraj	CPI	465,044	48.24	Dr. G. Sursith Sankar	AIADMK	256,087	26.56	208,957
TN	30	Thanjavur	S. Murasoli	DMK	502,245	49.44	P. Sivanesan	DMDK	182,662	17.98	319,583
TN	31	Sivaganga	Karti P. Chidambaram	INC	427,677	40.92	A. Xavierdass	AIADMK	222,013	21.24	205,664
TN	32	Madurai	S. Venkatesan	CPI(M)	430,323	44.10	Raama Sreenivasan	BJP	220,914	22.64	209,409
TN	33	Theni	Thanga Tamilselvan	DMK	571,493	50.58	TTV Dhinakaran	AMMK	292,668	25.90	278,825
TN	34	Virudhunagar	B. Manickam Tagore	INC	385,256	36.60	V. Vijayaprabhakaran	DMDK	380,877	36.19	4,379
TN	35	Ramanathapuram	K. Navaskani	IUML	509,664	46.18	O. Panneerselvam	IND	342,882	31.07	166,782
TN	36	Thoothukkudi	Kanimozhi Karunanidhi	DMK	540,729	55.82	R. Sivasamy Velumani	AIADMK	147,991	15.28	392,738
TN	37	Tenkasi	Rani Srikumar	DMK	425,679	41.65	Dr K Krishnasamy	AIADMK	229,480	22.46	196,199
TN	38	Tirunelveli	C. Robert Bruce	INC	502,296	47.38	Nainar Nagenthran	BJP	336,676	31.76	165,620
TN	39	Kanniyakumari	Vijay Vasanth	INC	546,248	53.28	Pon Radhakrishnan	BJP	366,341	35.73	179,907
TG	1	Adilabad	Godam Nagesh	BJP	568,168	46.43	Athram Suguna	INC	477,516	39.02	90,652
TG	2	Peddapalle	Vamsi Krishna Gaddam	INC	475,587	43.65	Srinivas Gomase	BJP	344,223	31.59	131,364
TG	3	Karimnagar	Bandi Sanjay Kumar	BJP	585,116	44.75	Velchala Rajender Rao	INC	359,907	27.53	225,209
TG	4	Nizamabad	Arvind Dharmapuri	BJP	592,318	48.19	Jeevanreddy Thatiparthi	INC	483,077	39.30	109,241
TG	5	Zahirabad	Suresh Kumar Shetkar	INC	528,418	42.83	B. B. Patil	BJP	482,230	39.09	46,188
TG	6	Medak	M. Raghunandan Rao	BJP	471,217	34.11	Neelam Madhu	INC	432,078	31.27	39,139
TG	7	Malkajgiri	Etela Rajender	BJP	991,042	51.60	Suneetha Mahender Reddy	INC	599,567	31.22	391,475
TG	8	Secunderabad	G. Kishan Reddy	BJP	473,012	45.37	Danam Nagender	INC	423,068	40.58	49,944
TG	9	Hyderabad	Asaduddin Owaisi	AIMIM	661,981	61.44	Madhavi Latha	BJP	323,894	30.06	338,087
TG	10	Chevella	Konda Vishweshwar Reddy	BJP	809,882	48.53	Dr Gaddam Ranjith Reddy	INC	636,985	38.17	172,897
TG	11	Mahbubnagar	D. K. Aruna	BJP	510,747	41.80	Challa Vamshi Chand Reddy	INC	506,247	41.44	4,500
TG	12	Nagarkurnool	Mallu Ravi	INC	465,072	38.29	Bharath Prasad Pothuganti	BJP	370,658	30.52	94,414
TG	13	Nalgonda	Kunduru Raghuveer	INC	784,337	60.79	Saidi Reddy Shanampudi	BJP	224,432	17.39	559,905
TG	14	Bhongir	Chamala Kiran Kumar Reddy	INC	629,143	45.04	Dr. Boora Narsaiah Goud	BJP	406,973	29.14	222,170
TG	15	Warangal	Kadiyam Kavya	INC	581,294	46.15	Aroori Ramesh	BJP	360,955	28.66	220,339
TG	16	Mahabubabad	Balram Naik Porika	INC	612,774	55.60	Kavitha Maloth	BHRS	263,609	23.92	349,165
TG	17	Khammam	Ramasahayam Raghuram Reddy	INC	766,929	61.63	Nama Nageswara Rao	BHRS	299,082	24.03	467,847
TR	1	Tripura West	Biplab Kumar Deb	BJP	881,341	73.74	Asish Kumar Saha	INC	269,763	22.57	611,578
TR	2	Tripura East	Kriti Devi Debbarman	BJP	777,447	69.66	Rajendra Reang	CPI(M)	290,628	26.04	486,819
UP	1	Saharanpur	Imran Masood	INC	547,967	44.74	Raghav Lakhanpal	BJP	483,425	39.47	64,542
UP	2	Kairana	Iqra Choudhary	SP	528,013	49.05	Pradeep Kumar	BJP	458,897	42.63	69,116
UP	3	Muzaffarnagar	Harendra Singh Malik	SP	470,721	43.80	Sanjeev Balyan	BJP	446,049	41.50	24,672
UP	4	Bijnor	Chandan Chauhan	RLD	404,493	39.66	Deepak	SP	366,985	35.98	37,508
UP	5	Nagina	Chandrashekhar	ASP(KR)	512,552	51.46	Om Kumar	BJP	361,079	36.25	151,473
UP	6	Moradabad	Ruchi Vira	SP	637,363	49.90	Kunwar Sarvesh Kumar	BJP	531,601	41.62	105,762
UP	7	Rampur	Mohibbullah	SP	481,503	50.03	Ghanshyam Singh Lodhi	BJP	394,069	40.95	87,434
UP	8	Sambhal	Zia Ur Rehman	SP	571,161	48.09	Parmeshwar Lal Saini	BJP	449,667	37.86	121,494
UP	9	Amroha	Kanwar Singh Tanwar	BJP	476,506	43.13	Kunwar Danish Ali	INC	447,836	40.54	28,670
UP	10	Meerut	Arun Govil	BJP	546,469	46.40	Sunita Verma	SP	535,884	45.50	10,585
UP	11	Baghpat	Rajkumar Sangwan	RLD	488,967	52.65	Amarpal	SP	329,508	35.48	159,459
UP	12	Ghaziabad	Atul Garg	BJP	854,170	58.42	Dolly Sharma	INC	517,205	35.37	336,965
UP	13	Gautam Buddha Nagar	Mahesh Sharma	BJP	857,829	60.12	Mahendra Singh Nagar	SP	298,357	20.91	559,472
UP	14	Bulandshahr	Bhola Singh	BJP	597,310	57.02	Shivram	INC	322,176	30.76	275,134
UP	15	Aligarh	Satish Kumar Gautam	BJP	501,834	44.47	Bijendra Singh	SP	486,187	43.09	15,647
UP	16	Hathras	Anoop Pradhan	BJP	554,746	51.54	Jasveer Valmiki	SP	307,428	28.56	247,318
UP	17	Mathura	Hema Malini	BJP	510,064	53.55	Mukesh Dhangar	INC	216,657	22.75	293,407
UP	18	Agra	S. P. Singh Baghel	BJP	599,397	53.67	Suresh Chand Kardam	SP	328,103	29.38	271,294
UP	19	Fatehpur Sikri	Rajkumar Chahar	BJP	445,657	43.42	Ramnath Singh Sikarwar	INC	402,252	39.19	43,405
UP	20	Firozabad	Akshay Yadav	SP	543,037	49.28	Vishwadeep Singh	BJP	453,725	41.17	89,312
UP	21	Mainpuri	Dimple Yadav	SP	598,526	57.03	Jayveer Singh	BJP	376,887	35.91	221,639
UP	22	Etah	Devesh Shakya	SP	475,808	47.33	Rajveer Singh	BJP	447,756	44.54	28,052
UP	23	Badaun	Aditya Yadav	SP	501,855	46.33	Durvijay Singh Shakya	BJP	466,864	43.10	34,991
UP	24	Aonla	Neeraj Maurya	SP	492,515	45.52	Dharmendra Kashyap	BJP	476,546	44.04	15,969
UP	25	Bareilly	Chhatra Pal Singh Gangwar	BJP	567,127	50.94	Praveen Singh Aron	SP	532,323	47.81	34,804
UP	26	Pilibhit	Jitin Prasada	BJP	607,158	52.60	Bhagwat Saran Gangwar	SP	442,223	38.31	164,935
UP	27	Shahjahanpur	Arun Kumar Sagar	BJP	592,718	47.82	Jyotsna Gond	SP	537,339	43.35	55,379
UP	28	Kheri	Utkarsh Verma	SP	557,365	46.24	Ajay Kumar	BJP	523,036	43.39	34,329
UP	29	Dhaurahra	Anand Bhadauriya	SP	443,743	40.17	Rekha Verma	BJP	439,294	39.77	4,449
UP	30	Sitapur	Rakesh Rathore	INC	531,138	48.50	Rajesh Verma	BJP	441,497	40.32	89,641
UP	31	Hardoi	Jai Prakash	BJP	486,798	44.61	Usha Verma	SP	458,942	42.05	27,856
UP	32	Misrikh	Ashok Kumar Rawat	BJP	475,016	45.50	Sangita Rajvanshi	SP	441,610	42.30	33,406
UP	33	Unnao	Sakshi Maharaj	BJP	616,133	47.66	Annu Tandon	SP	580,315	44.89	35,818
UP	34	Mohanlalganj	R. K. Chaudhary	SP	667,869	48.80	Kaushal Kishore	BJP	597,577	43.66	70,292
UP	35	Lucknow	Rajnath Singh	BJP	612,709	54.24	Ravidas Mehrotra	SP	477,550	42.28	135,159
UP	36	Rae Bareli	Rahul Gandhi	INC	687,649	66.67	Dinesh Pratap Singh	BJP	297,619	28.86	390,030
UP	37	Amethi	Kishori Lal	INC	539,228	55.52	Smriti Irani	BJP	372,032	38.30	167,196
UP	38	Sultanpur	Rambhual Nishad	SP	444,330	43.35	Maneka Gandhi	BJP	401,156	39.14	43,174
UP	39	Pratapgarh	Shiv Pal Singh Patel	SP	441,932	46.80	Sangam Lal Gupta	BJP	375,726	39.78	66,206
UP	40	Farrukhabad	Mukesh Rajput	BJP	487,963	47.40	Dr. Naval Kishor Shakya	SP	485,285	47.14	2,678
UP	41	Etawah	Jitendra Kumar Dohare	SP	490,747	47.76	Ram Shankar Katheria	BJP	432,328	42.07	58,419
UP	42	Kannauj	Akhilesh Yadav	SP	642,292	52.95	Subrat Pathak	BJP	471,370	38.86	170,922
UP	43	Kanpur	Ramesh Awasthi	BJP	443,055	50.16	Alok Misra	INC	422,087	47.79	20,968
UP	44	Akbarpur	Bhole Singh	BJP	517,423	47.94	Rajaram Pal	SP	473,078	43.83	44,345
UP	45	Jalaun	Narayan Das Ahirwar	SP	530,180	47.43	Bhanu Pratap Singh Verma	BJP	476,282	42.61	53,898
UP	46	Jhansi	Anurag Sharma	BJP	690,316	50.57	Pradeep Jain "Aditya"	INC	587,702	43.05	102,614
UP	47	Hamirpur	Ajendra Singh Lodhi	SP	490,683	44.53	Kunwar Pushpendra Chandel	BJP	488,054	44.29	2,629
UP	48	Banda	Krishna Devi Shivshanker Patel	SP	406,567	39.44	R. K. Singh Patel	BJP	335,357	32.53	71,210
UP	49	Fatehpur	Naresh Chandra Uttam Patel	SP	500,328	45.53	Niranjan Jyoti	BJP	467,129	42.51	33,199
UP	50	Kaushambi	Pushpendra Saroj	SP	509,787	51.16	Vinod Kumar Sonkar	BJP	405,843	40.73	103,944
UP	51	Phulpur	Praveen Patel	BJP	452,600	44.84	Amar Nath Singh Maurya	SP	448,268	44.41	4,332
UP	52	Allahabad	Ujjwal Raman Singh	INC	462,145	49.32	Neeraj Tripathi	BJP	403,350	43.04	58,795
UP	53	Barabanki	Tanuj Punia	INC	719,927	56.14	Rajrani Rawat	BJP	504,223	39.32	215,704
UP	54	Faizabad	Awadhesh Prasad	SP	554,289	48.92	Lallu Singh	BJP	499,722	44.10	54,567
UP	55	Ambedkar Nagar	Lalji Verma	SP	544,959	46.59	Ritesh Pandey	BJP	407,712	34.86	137,247
UP	56	Baharaich	Anand Kumar	BJP	518,802	49.71	Ramesh Chandra	SP	454,575	43.55	64,227
UP	57	Kaiserganj	Karan Bhushan Singh	BJP	571,263	54.55	Bhagat Ram	SP	422,420	40.34	148,843
UP	58	Shrawasti	Ram Shiromani Verma	SP	511,055	49.30	Saket Misra	BJP	434,382	41.90	76,673
UP	59	Gonda	Kirtivardhan Singh	BJP	474,258	50.25	Shreya Verma	SP	428,034	45.35	46,224
UP	60	Domariyaganj	Jagdambika Pal	BJP	463,303	45.89	Kushal Tiwari	SP	420,575	41.66	42,728
UP	61	Basti	Ram Prasad Chaudhary	SP	527,005	49.02	Harish Dwivedi	BJP	426,011	39.62	100,994
UP	62	Sant Kabir Nagar	Laxmikant Pappu Nishad	SP	498,695	46.09	Pravin Kumar Nishad	BJP	406,525	37.57	92,170
UP	63	Maharajganj	Pankaj Chaudhary	BJP	591,310	49.25	Virendra Chaudhary	INC	555,859	46.29	35,451
UP	64	Gorakhpur	Ravi Kishan	BJP	585,834	51.09	Kajal Nishad	SP	482,308	42.06	103,526
UP	65	Kushi Nagar	Vijay Kumar Dubey	BJP	516,345	48.22	Pintu Saithwar	SP	434,555	40.59	81,790
UP	66	Deoria	Shashank Mani	BJP	504,541	48.84	Akhilesh Pratap Singh	INC	469,699	45.47	34,842
UP	67	Bansgaon	Kamlesh Paswan	BJP	428,693	45.81	Sadal Prasad	INC	425,543	45.48	3,150
UP	68	Lalganj	Daroga Prasad Saroj	SP	439,959	44.16	Neelam Sonker	BJP	324,936	32.61	115,023
UP	69	Azamgarh	Dharmendra Yadav	SP	508,239	48.48	Dinesh Lal Yadav	BJP	347,204	33.12	161,035
UP	70	Ghosi	Rajeev Rai	SP	503,131	43.86	Dr. Arvind Rajbhar	SBSP	340,188	29.66	162,943
UP	71	Salempur	Ramashankar Rajbhar	SP	405,472	44.57	Ravindar Kushawaha	BJP	401,899	44.17	3,573
UP	72	Ballia	Sanatan Pandey	SP	467,068	46.75	Neeraj Shekhar	BJP	423,684	42.41	43,384
UP	73	Jaunpur	Babu Singh Kushwaha	SP	509,130	46.48	Kripashankar Singh	BJP	409,795	37.41	99,335
UP	74	Machhlishahr	Priya Saroj	SP	451,292	42.95	Bholanath	BJP	415,442	39.54	35,850
UP	75	Ghazipur	Afzal Ansari	SP	539,912	47.19	Pars Nath Rai	BJP	415,051	36.28	124,861
UP	76	Chandauli	Birendra Singh	SP	474,476	42.84	Mahendra Nath Pandey	BJP	452,911	40.90	21,565
UP	77	Varanasi	Narendra Modi	BJP	612,970	54.65	Ajay Rai	INC	460,457	41.05	152,513
UP	78	Bhadohi	Vinod Kumar Bind	BJP	459,982	42.84	Laliteshpati Tripathi	AITC	415,910	38.73	44,072
UP	79	Mirzapur	Anupriya Patel	AD(S)	471,631	43.25	Ramesh Chand Bind	SP	433,821	39.79	37,810
UP	80	Robertsganj	Chhotelal	SP	465,848	47.03	Rinki Singh	AD(S)	336,614	33.98	129,234
WB	1	Cooch Behar	Jagadish Chandra Barma Basunia	AITC	788,375	49.04	Nisith Pramanik	BJP	749,125	46.60	39,250
WB	2	Alipurduars	Manoj Tigga	BJP	695,314	49.66	Prakash Chik Baraik	AITC	619,867	44.27	75,447
WB	3	Jalpaiguri	Jayanta Kumar Roy	BJP	766,568	49.09	Nirmal Chandra Roy	AITC	679,875	43.54	86,693
WB	4	Darjeeling	Raju Bista	BJP	679,331	51.88	Gopal Lama	AITC	500,806	38.25	178,525
WB	5	Raiganj	Kartick Chandra Paul	BJP	560,897	41.05	Krishna Kalyani	AITC	492,700	36.05	68,197
WB	6	Balurghat	Sukanta Majumdar	BJP	574,996	46.75	Biplab Mitra	AITC	564,610	45.91	10,386
WB	7	Maldaha Uttar	Khagen Murmu	BJP	527,023	37.37	Prasun Banerjee	AITC	449,315	31.86	77,708
WB	8	Maldaha Dakshin	Isha Khan Choudhury	INC	572,395	41.87	Sreerupa Mitra Chaudhury	BJP	444,027	32.48	128,368
WB	9	Jangipur	Khalilur Rahaman	AITC	544,427	40.25	Murtoja Hossain Bokul	INC	427,790	31.63	116,637
WB	10	Baharampur	Yusuf Pathan	AITC	524,516	38.08	Adhir Ranjan Chowdhury	INC	439,494	31.91	85,022
WB	11	Murshidabad	Abu Taher Khan	AITC	682,442	44.65	Md. Salim	CPI(M)	518,227	33.91	164,215
WB	12	Krishnanagar	Mahua Moitra	AITC	628,789	44.32	Amrita Roy	BJP	572,084	40.32	56,705
WB	13	Ranaghat	Jagannath Sarkar	BJP	782,396	51.11	Mukut Mani Adhikari	AITC	595,497	38.90	186,899
WB	14	Bangaon	Shantanu Thakur	BJP	719,505	48.41	Biswajit Das	AITC	645,812	43.45	73,693
WB	15	Barrackpur	Partha Bhowmick	AITC	520,231	46.01	Arjun Singh	BJP	455,793	40.31	64,438
WB	16	Dum Dum	Sougata Ray	AITC	528,579	42.33	Silbhadra Datta	BJP	457,919	36.67	70,660
WB	17	Barasat	Kakoli Ghosh Dastidar	AITC	692,010	45.69	Swapan Majumder	BJP	577,821	38.15	114,189
WB	18	Basirhat	Haji Nurul Islam	AITC	803,762	52.94	Rekha Patra	BJP	470,215	30.97	333,547
WB	19	Jaynagar	Pratima Mondal	AITC	894,312	60.72	Ashok Kandary	BJP	424,093	28.79	470,219
WB	20	Mathurapur	Bapi Haldar	AITC	755,731	50.81	Ashok Purkait	BJP	554,674	37.29	201,057
WB	21	Diamond Harbour	Abhishek Banerjee	AITC	1,048,230	68.93	Abhijit Das	BJP	337,300	22.18	710,930
WB	22	Jadavpur	Sayani Ghosh	AITC	717,899	46.05	Anirban Ganguly	BJP	459,698	29.48	258,201
WB	23	Kolkata Dakshin	Mala Roy	AITC	615,274	49.74	Debasree Chaudhuri	BJP	428,043	34.60	187,231
WB	24	Kolkata Uttar	Sudip Bandyopadhyay	AITC	454,696	47.94	Tapas Roy	BJP	362,136	38.18	92,560
WB	25	Howrah	Prasun Banerjee	AITC	626,493	49.65	Rathin Chakravarty	BJP	457,051	36.22	169,442
WB	26	Uluberia	Sajda Ahmed	AITC	724,622	52.53	Arunuday Paulchowdhury	BJP	505,949	36.68	218,673
WB	27	Sreerampur	Kalyan Banerjee	AITC	673,970	46.12	Kabir Shankar Bose	BJP	499,140	34.15	174,830
WB	28	Hooghly	Rachna Banerjee	AITC	702,744	46.72	Locket Chatterjee	BJP	625,891	41.61	76,853
WB	29	Arambag	Mitali Bag	AITC	712,587	46.24	Arup Kanti Digar	BJP	706,188	45.83	6,399
WB	30	Tamluk	Abhijit Gangopadhyay	BJP	765,584	48.79	Debangshu Bhattacharya	AITC	687,851	43.84	77,733
WB	31	Kanthi	Soumendu Adhikari	BJP	763,195	50.12	Uttam Barik	AITC	715,431	46.98	47,764
WB	32	Ghatal	Deepak Adhikari	AITC	837,990	52.78	Hiranmoy Chattopadhyaya	BJP	655,122	41.27	182,868
WB	33	Jhargram	Kalipada Saren	AITC	743,478	50.41	Pranat Tudu	BJP	569,430	38.61	174,048
WB	34	Medinipur	June Maliah	AITC	702,192	47.80	Agnimitra Paul	BJP	675,001	45.95	27,191
WB	35	Purulia	Jyotirmay Singh Mahato	BJP	578,489	40.85	Shantiram Mahato	AITC	561,410	39.65	17,079
WB	36	Bankura	Arup Chakraborty	AITC	641,813	45.15	Subhas Sarkar	BJP	609,035	42.85	32,778
WB	37	Bishnupur	Saumitra Khan	BJP	680,130	45.50	Sujata Mondal	AITC	674,563	45.13	5,567
WB	38	Bardhaman Purba	Sharmila Sarkar	AITC	720,302	48.52	Asim Kumar Sarkar	BJP	559,730	37.70	160,572
WB	39	Bardhaman-Durgapur	Kirti Azad	AITC	720,667	48.69	Dilip Ghosh	BJP	582,686	39.37	137,981
WB	40	Asansol	Shatrughan Sinha	AITC	605,645	47.09	S. S. Ahluwalia	BJP	546,081	42.46	59,564
WB	41	Bolpur	Asit Kumar Mal	AITC	855,633	56.79	Piya Saha	BJP	528,380	35.07	327,253
WB	42	Birbhum	Shatabdi Roy	AITC	717,961	47.44	Debtanu Bhattacharya	BJP	520,311	34.38	197,650
UK	1	Tehri Garhwal	Mala Rajya Lakshmi Shah	BJP	462,603	54.13	Jot Singh Gunsola	INC	190,110	22.25	272,493
UK	2	Garhwal	Anil Baluni	BJP	432,159	59.52	Ganesh Godiyal	INC	268,656	37.00	163,503
UK	3	Almora	Ajay Tamta	BJP	429,167	65.88	Pradeep Tamta	INC	195,070	29.94	234,097
UK	4	Nainital	Ajay Bhatt	BJP	772,671	61.54	Prakash Joshi	INC	438,123	34.89	334,548
UK	5	Haridwar	Trivendra Singh Rawat	BJP	653,808	50.46	Virendra Rawat	INC	489,752	37.80	164,056
AN	1	Andaman & Nicobar Islands	Bishnu Pada Ray	BJP	102,436	51.04	Kuldeep Rai Sharma	INC	78,040	38.88	24,396
CH	1	Chandigarh	Manish Tewari	INC	216,657	48.54	Sanjay Tandon	BJP	214,153	47.98	2,504
DN	1	Daman & Diu	Patel Umeshbhai Babubhai	IND	42,523	46.51	Lalubhai Babubhai Patel	BJP	36,298	39.70	6,225
DN	2	Dadar & Nagar Haveli	Delkar Kalaben Mohanbhai	BJP	121,074	60.41	Ajit Ramjibhai Mahala	INC	63,490	31.68	57,584
DL	1	Chandni Chowk	Praveen Khandelwal	BJP	516,496	53.77	Jai Prakash Agarwal	INC	427,171	44.47	89,325
DL	2	North-East Delhi	Manoj Tiwari	BJP	824,451	53.30	Kanhaiya Kumar	INC	685,673	44.33	138,778
DL	3	East Delhi	Harsh Malhotra	BJP	664,819	52.82	Kuldeep Kumar	AAP	571,156	45.38	93,663
DL	4	New Delhi	Bansuri Swaraj	BJP	453,185	53.78	Somnath Bharti	AAP	374,815	44.48	78,370
DL	5	North-West Delhi	Yogender Chandoliya	BJP	866,483	58.62	Udit Raj	INC	575,634	38.94	290,849
DL	6	West Delhi	Kamaljeet Sehrawat	BJP	842,658	55.59	Mahabal Mishra	AAP	643,645	42.46	199,013
DL	7	South Delhi	Ramvir Singh Bidhuri	BJP	692,832	53.71	Sahi Ram	AAP	568,499	44.07	124,333
LD	1	Lakshadweep	Muhammed Hamdullah Sayeed	INC	25,726	52.43	Mohammed Faizal Pp	NCP(SP)	23,079	47.04	2,647
PY	1	Puducherry	Ve. Vaithilingam	INC	426,005	53.37	A. Namassivayam	BJP	289,489	36.27	136,516
LA	1	Ladakh	Mohmad Haneefa	IND	65,259	48.48	Tsering Namgyal	INC	37,397	27.78	27,862
