= Kishori Lal (Kullu politician) =

Indian politician

Kishori Lal is an Indian politician of the Bharatiya Janata Party, and a member of the Himachal Pradesh Legislative Assembly from 2007-2012 and won again in 2017 elections. He represented the Baijnath constituency in Kangra district. Recently he lost in 2022 assembly elections.
