= Kishori Lal (UP politician) =

Indian politician

Member of Parliament, Lok Sabha
- Incumbent
- Assumed office 2024
- Preceded by: Smriti Irani
- Constituency: Amethi

Personal details
- Party: Indian National Congress
- Occupation: Politician

Kishori Lal is an Indian politician and the elected candidate for Lok Sabha from Amethi Lok Sabha constituency. He is a member of the Indian National Congress.

== See also ==
- 18th Lok Sabha
- Samajwadi Party
