= Raigarh district =

District of Chhattisgarh, India

Raigarh district रायगढ़ जिला
- District
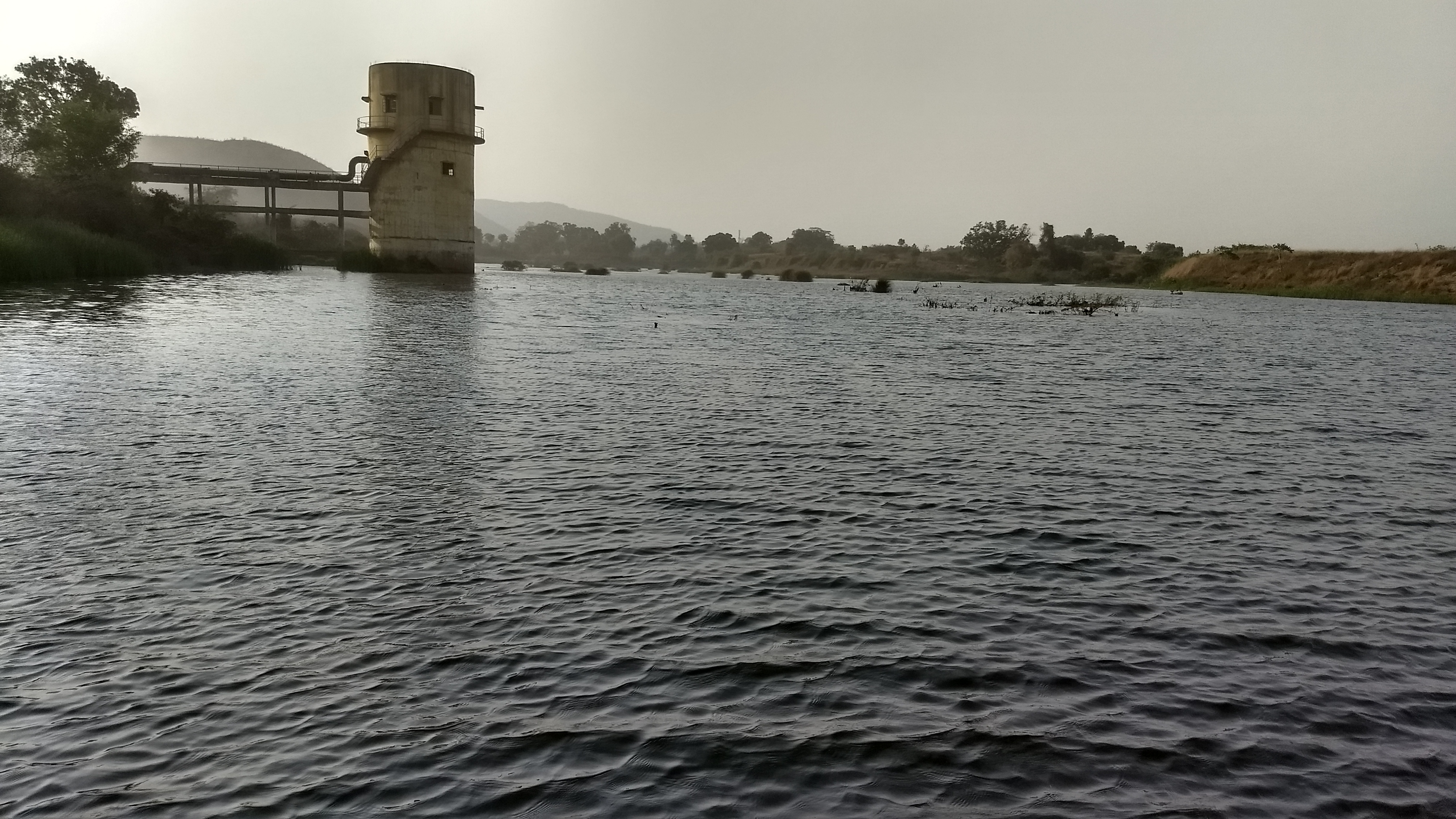
- The Kelo River flowing near Raigarh

- Location of Raigarh district in Chhattisgarh
- Coordinates: 21°54′N 83°24′E
- Country: India
- State: Chhattisgarh
- Division: Bilaspur
- Established: 1 January 1948
- Headquarters: Raigarh
- Subdivisions: 5 (Raigarh, Kharsia, Gharghoda, Lailunga, Dharamjaigarh)

Government
  - Type: District Administration
  - District Collector & Magistrate: Mayank Chaturvedi, IAS
  - Superintendent of Police: Shashi Mohan Singh, IPS
  - Lok Sabha constituency: Raigarh (ST) (MP: Radheshyam Rathiya)
  - Vidhan Sabha constituencies: Lailunga (ST); Raigarh; Kharsia; Dharamjaigarh (ST)

Area
  - District: 5,212.06 km^{2} (2,012.39 sq mi)
- Elevation: 215 m (705 ft)

Population (2011) (post-bifurcation; 1,493,984 undivided)
  - District: 1,112,982
  - Density: 213.540/km^{2} (553.065/sq mi)
  - Urban: 218,821

Demographics
  - Literacy: 73.26%
  - Sex ratio: 987 ♀ / 1,000 ♂
  - Official languages: Hindi, Chhattisgarhi
  - Regional languages: Odia, Kurukh, Sadri
- Time zone: UTC+05:30 (IST)
- PIN: 496001 (Raigarh)
- Telephone code: 07762
- Vehicle registration: CG-13
- Tehsils: 10 (Raigarh, Pusaur, Kharsia, Gharghoda, Tamnar, Lailunga, Mukdega, Dharamjaigarh, Chhal, Kapu)
- Major highways: NH 49, NH 153
- Website: raigarh.gov.in/en/

Raigarh district is a district in the eastern part of the state of Chhattisgarh in central India, bordering the state of Odisha. The city of Raigarh serves as its administrative headquarters. The district is also a major industrial and energy hub of India, containing extensive coal reserves in the Mand–Raigarh coalfield and numerous steel, sponge iron, and thermal power plants.

Originally constituted in 1948 through the merger of the princely states of Raigarh, Udaipur (Dharamjaigarh), Sarangarh, Jashpur, and Sakti, the district attained its current geographical boundaries following the separation of Jashpur in 1998 and Sarangarh-Bilaigarh district in September 2022.

== History ==
=== Prehistory and early period ===
Raigarh district contains some of the oldest prehistoric rock art sites in the Indian subcontinent. In 1910, British railway engineer C. W. Anderson discovered Mesolithic and Chalcolithic rock paintings in the caves of Singhanpur, situated in the Chawarhal hill range approximately 20 km west of Raigarh. Additional prehistoric rock shelters featuring ochre and haematite depictions of hunting scenes, geometric motifs, anthropomorphic figures, and wild fauna have been documented at Kabra Pahad (Gajmar Pahad, 8 km east of Raigarh), Basnajhar, Ongna, Karmagarh, Botalda, and in the hills of Dharamjaigarh.

=== Princely states of Raigarh and Udaipur ===
Prior to Indian independence, the present territory of the district largely comprised two princely states: Raigarh State in the south and Udaipur State (centred at Dharamjaigarh) in the north. Raigarh estate was founded in 1625 by Raja Madan Singh, a Raj Gond ruler tracing his lineage to the Nagvanshi Gond dynasty of Chanda (Chandrapur). During the Third Anglo-Maratha War and subsequent treaties, Raja Deonath Singh (r. 1830–1863) entered into a subsidiary alliance with the East India Company, and the rulers were granted the hereditary title of Raja Bahadur in 1911 during the reign of Raja Bhup Deo Singh (r. 1890–1917).

Under Maharaja Chakradhar Singh (r. 1924–1947), a scholar, percussionist, and patron of the performing arts, Raigarh became an acclaimed centre for Hindustani classical music and Kathak dance. Synthesising elements of the Jaipur, Lucknow, and Banaras traditions with local rhythmic structures, he established the distinct Raigarh Gharana of Kathak and authored foundational musicological treatises including Nartansarvaswam, Talatoynidhi, and Ragratnabhumi. In his memory, the district administration organises the annual ten-day Chakradhar Samaroh classical music and dance festival during Ganesh Chaturthi.

To the north, Udaipur State was established in 1818 as an offshoot of Surguja State and was ruled from 1860 onward by Raksel Rajput rulersbeginning with Raja Bahadur Bindeshwari Prasad Singh Deo, with its capital at Dharamjaigarh (formerly Rabkob). Both Raigarh and Udaipur were administered under the Central Provinces and Berar and later the Eastern States Agency.

=== Post-independence and administrative reorganisations ===
On 1 January 1948, the last ruler of Raigarh State, Raja Lalitkumar Singh, together with the rulers of the neighbouring states of Udaipur, Sarangarh, Jashpur, and Sakti, signed Instruments of Accession to the Dominion of India, merging their territories to constitute Raigarh district within Central Provinces and Berar (and Madhya Pradesh from 1956). Sakti was subsequently transferred to Bilaspur district. On 25 May 1998, the northern subdivision of Jashpur was carved out to form a separate Jashpur district, and on 1 November 2000, Raigarh became part of the newly formed state of Chhattisgarh. On 3 September 2022, the southern tehsils of Sarangarh and Baramkela were separated from Raigarh district and combined with Bilaigarh from Baloda Bazar district to form Sarangarh-Bilaigarh district.

== Geography ==
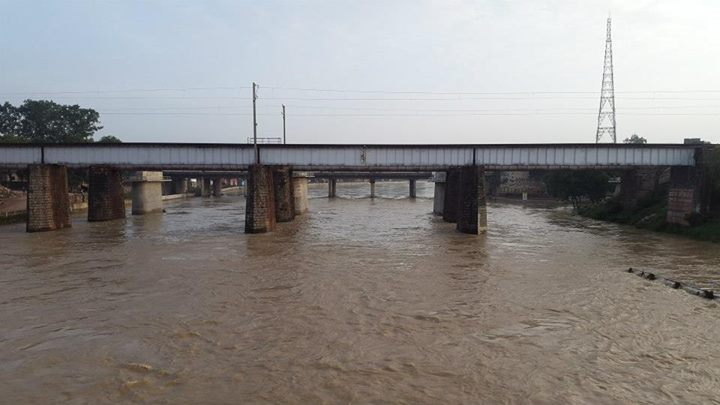
Railway bridge across the Kelo River in Raigarh

Pahad Mandir atop the hills overlooking Raigarh

Raigarh district is situated in eastern Chhattisgarh within the Bilaspur division, centred around 21°54′N 83°24′E. Following the 2022 reorganisation, the district covers a revenue area of 5,212.06 km^{2} (with 1,096.87 km^{2} under forest cover). It is bounded by Surguja district and Jashpur district to the north, Jharsuguda district and Sundargarh district of Odisha to the east, Sarangarh-Bilaigarh district to the south, and Sakti district and Korba district to the west.

=== Physiography, geology, and hydrology ===
Topographically, the district transitions from the forested upland plateaus and scarps of the Chota Nagpur Plateau and Udaipur hills in the north (covering Dharamjaigarh, Kapu, Lailunga, Gharghoda, and Tamnar) to the undulating riverine plains of the Chhattisgarh basin in the south (covering Raigarh, Pusaur, and Kharsia). Geologically, around 40% of the district is underlain by coal-bearing sedimentary strata of the Gondwana Supergroup—comprising the Talchir, Karharbari, Barakar, and Kamthi formations—flanked by Archaean granitic gneisses in the north and Proterozoic sedimentary rocks of the Chhattisgarh Supergroup in the south. The Barakar Formation hosts the vast Mand–Raigarh Coalfield (including the Gare Pelma, Chhal, and Baroud coal blocks), making Raigarh one of India's primary coal-mining, sponge iron, steel-manufacturing, and thermal power generation hubs. Major industrial facilities in the district include Jindal Steel and Power (JSPL), NTPC Lara Super Thermal Power Station, MSP Steel & Power, and numerous captive power plants consuming over 20,000 tonnes of coal daily. The district is also known for traditional Dhokra (bell-metal casting) and Kosa (Tussar silk) weaving.

The entire district lies within the Mahanadi drainage basin, with rivers flowing generally north-to-south to join the Mahanadi along the district's southern margin:

- Kelo River: Originating in the Ludeg hills of Lailunga tehsil, the 112.6 km Kelo River flows southward through Gharghoda, Tamnar, and Raigarh city before joining the Mahanadi near Mahadeopali in Odisha. The Kelo Project (Late Dilip Singh Judeo Project) dam at Danote village near Raigarh provides irrigation and municipal water supply.
- Mand River: Rising on the Mainpat plateau in Surguja, the perennial Mand River flows southward through Dharamjaigarh and Kharsia before joining the Mahanadi at Chandrapur.
- Kurket River: Drains the central coal-bearing tracts of Dharamjaigarh and Gharghoda before merging into the Mand River.

=== Climate ===
Raigarh experiences a tropical wet and dry climate characterised by hot, dry summers and mild winters. Summer temperatures between April and June frequently range from 29.5 °C to 48 °C (85 °F to 118 °F), while winter temperatures between December and January range from 8 °C to 25 °C (46 °F to 77 °F). The district receives an average annual precipitation of approximately 1,584 mm, primarily from the southwest monsoon between June and September.

== Administration and politics ==
Raigarh district is administered as part of the Bilaspur division and is divided into 5 revenue subdivisions (Raigarh, Kharsia, Gharghoda, Lailunga, and Dharamjaigarh), 10 tehsils (Raigarh, Pusaur, Kharsia, Gharghoda, Tamnar, Lailunga, Mukdega, Dharamjaigarh, Chhal, and Kapu), and 7 Janpad Panchayats (Community Development Blocks: Raigarh, Pusaur, Kharsia, Gharghoda, Tamnar, Lailunga, and Dharamjaigarh). Urban local bodies include 1 Municipal Corporation (Raigarh Municipal Corporation), 1 Nagar Palika Parishad (Municipal Council at Kharsia), and 5 Nagar Panchayats (Dharamjaigarh, Gharghoda, Kirodimal Nagar, Lailunga, and Pusaur). Rural local governance covers 34 Revenue Inspector (RI) circles, 296 Patwari Halkas, 549 Gram Panchayats, and 951 revenue villages.

At the federal level, the district falls within the Raigarh Lok Sabha constituency (reserved for Scheduled Tribes), represented in the 18th Lok Sabha by Radheshyam Rathiya of the Bharatiya Janata Party (BJP). In the Chhattisgarh Legislative Assembly, the district comprises four assembly constituencies:

- Lailunga (ST) – represented by Vidyawati Sidar (INC)
- Raigarh – represented by O. P. Choudhary (BJP), Minister of Finance, Government of Chhattisgarh
- Kharsia – represented by Umesh Patel (INC)
- Dharamjaigarh (ST) – represented by Laljeet Singh Rathia (INC)

== Demographics ==
Traditional Kosa (Tussar silk) reeling and weaving in Raigarh district

According to the 2011 Census of India, undivided Raigarh district recorded a total population of 1,493,984, with a population density of 211 inhabitants per square kilometre (550/sq mi), a decadal growth rate of 18.02% (2001–2011), a sex ratio of 993 females per 1,000 males, and a literacy rate of 73.26%.

Within the residual boundaries of Raigarh district (following the 2022 separation of Sarangarh and Baramkela tehsils), the 2011 Census population stood at 1,112,982, of which 894,161 (80.34%) resided in rural areas and 218,821 (19.66%) lived in urban areas. The reorganised district had a sex ratio of 987 females per 1,000 males. Scheduled Castes numbered 126,349 (11.35%) and Scheduled Tribes numbered 443,752 (39.87%) of the population. Prominent indigenous communities include the Gond, Kanwar, Oraon, Sawara, and the Birhor (a PVTG concentrated in the forested Dharamjaigarh belt).

=== Religion ===
Religions in Raigarh district (2011 Census)
1. Hinduism (93.9%)
2. Christianity (4.22%)
3. Islam (1.43%)
4. Other / not stated (0.49%)

According to the 2011 Census, Hinduism is the majority religion in the reorganised district, practised by 93.86% of the population. Christianity is the second-largest religion at 4.22% (concentrated primarily in the northern tribal blocks of Lailunga and Dharamjaigarh), followed by Islam at 1.43%, while Sikhism, Buddhism, Jainism, indigenous tribal faiths, and unstated affiliations account for the remaining 0.49%.

=== Languages ===
Languages of Raigarh district (2011 Census)
1. Chhattisgarhi (72.3%)
2. Odia (8.63%)
3. Hindi (8.32%)
4. Kurukh (5.29%)
5. Bengali (1.07%)
6. Bhojpuri (1.04%)
7. Other (3.31%)

At the 2011 Census of India, 72.34% of the district's population spoke Chhattisgarhi as their first language. Odia (including its Aghria and Sambalpuri varieties along the eastern border with Odisha) was the second most widely spoken mother tongue at 8.63%, followed closely by standard Hindi (8.32%) and Kurukh (5.29%, spoken by the Oraon community in the northern uplands). Bengali (1.07%, largely in the Dharamjaigarh resettlement belt) and Bhojpuri (1.04%) were also spoken, alongside smaller communities speaking Sadri and Asuri (an Austroasiatic language).

== Transport ==
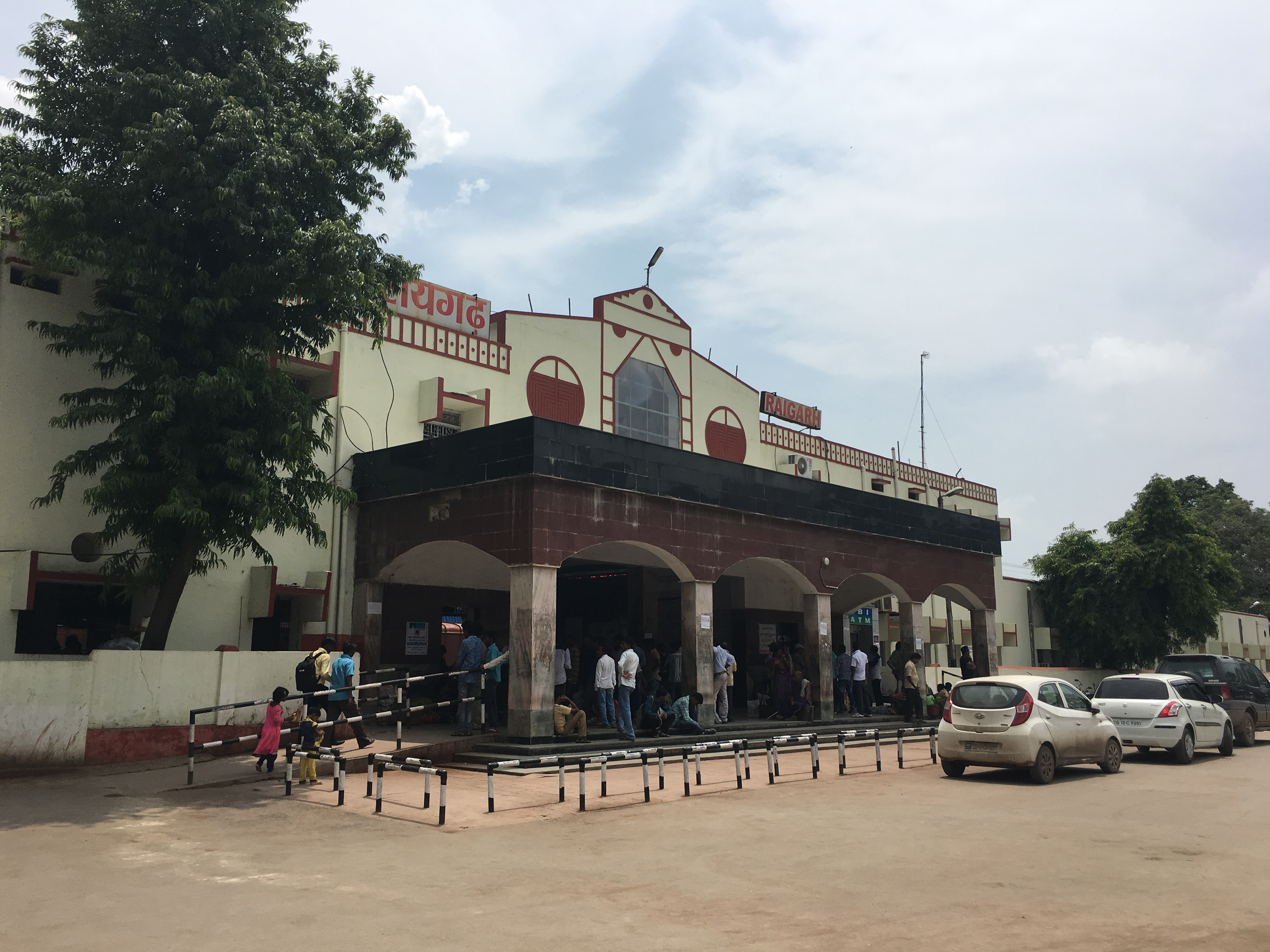
Entrance of Raigarh railway station

=== Road ===
Raigarh is connected to major cities in Chhattisgarh, Odisha, and Jharkhand through a network of national and state highways. National Highway 49 (part of AH46, connecting Bilaspur to Kharagpur) passes through Kharsia and Raigarh before entering Jharsuguda district in Odisha. National Highway 153 originates in Raigarh and runs southward through Pusaur and Sarangarh to Saraipali on NH 53. State highways connect Raigarh northward via Gharghoda and Dharamjaigarh to Pathalgaon, Ambikapur, and Jashpur Nagar. Intercity bus services operate from the Kevdabadi Bus Stand in Raigarh to Raipur (270 km), Bilaspur (170 km), Ambikapur (190 km), and Jharsuguda (90 km).

=== Rail ===
The Tatanagar–Bilaspur section of the Howrah–Nagpur–Mumbai line, operated by the Bilaspur Railway Division of the South East Central Railway zone, traverses the southern plains of the district. Raigarh railway station (Category A) and Kharsia railway station are the principal passenger hubs on the main line, supplemented by suburban stations at Kirodimal Nagar, Bhupdeopur, and Kotarlia. Express and superfast trains—including the Gondwana Express and Raigarh–Nizamuddin Jan Shatabdi Express—originate at or pass through Raigarh, linking it directly to Mumbai, Kolkata, New Delhi, Pune, Bhubaneswar, and Ahmedabad.

To serve the northern coalfields and expand passenger connectivity, Chhattisgarh East Railway Limited (CERL)—a joint venture between SECL, IRCON, and the Government of Chhattisgarh—developed the Chhattisgarh East Rail Corridor. Phase-I of the corridor comprises a 124.8 km electrified broad-gauge line running northward from Kharsia through Chhal, Gharghoda, and Korichhapar to Dharamjaigarh, with a 31 km spur line from Gharghoda to the Gare Pelma coalfields at Donga Mahua and feeder links to Chhal and Baroud. Phase-II extends the railway line 62.5 km westward from Dharamjaigarh to Urga near Korba.

=== Air ===
Aviation infrastructure within the district includes the state-owned Kondatarai Airstrip, located 10 km south of Raigarh, and Raigarh Airport, a private airstrip operated by Jindal Steel and Power (JSPL) northwest of the city.

The nearest airport with scheduled commercial passenger flights is Veer Surendra Sai Airport in Jharsuguda, Odisha (approximately 90 km east of Raigarh), while Swami Vivekananda Airport in Raipur (270 km southwest) serves as the primary commercial air hub within Chhattisgarh.

== Education ==
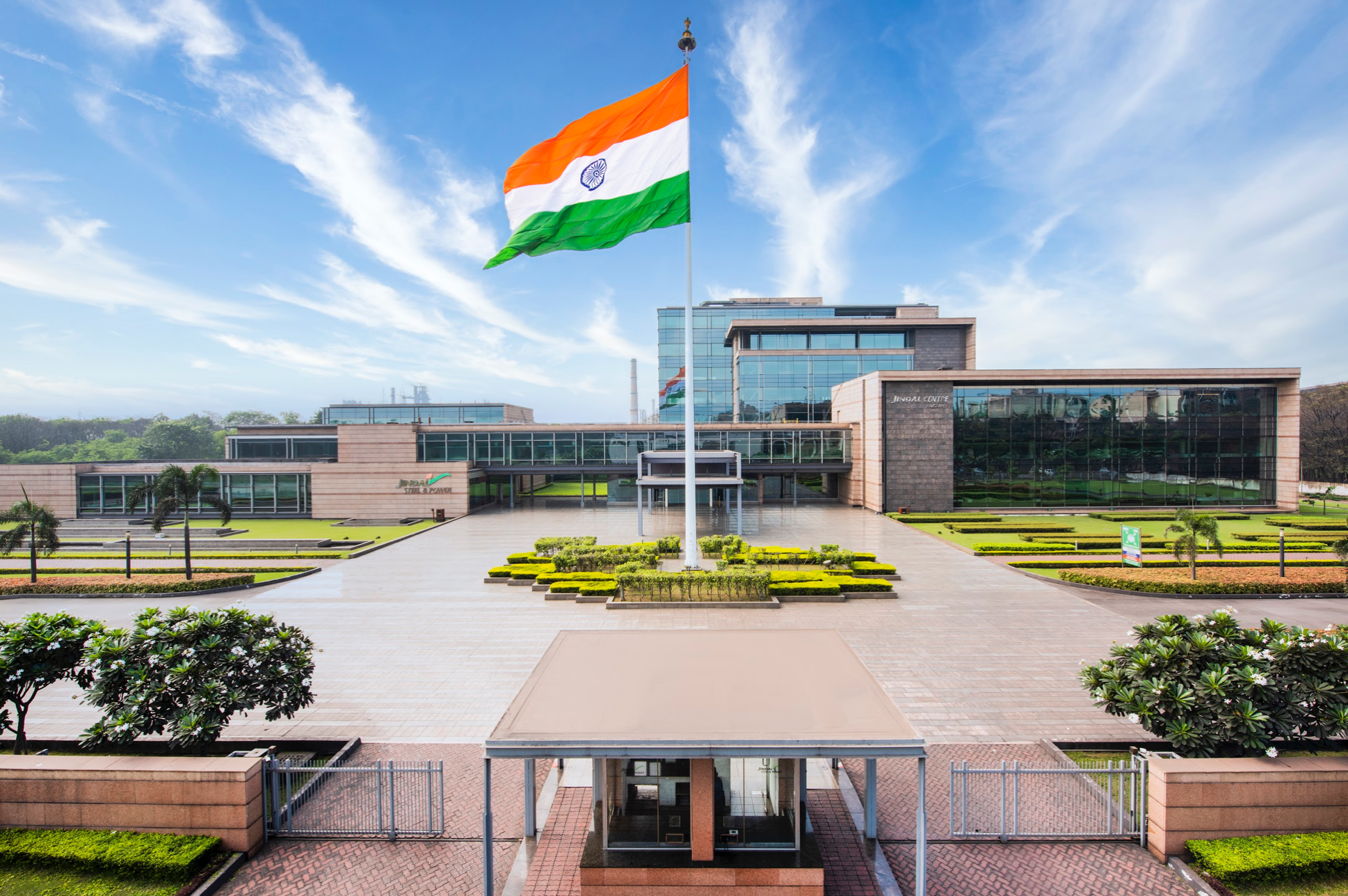
Institutional campus in Raigarh

Raigarh serves as the higher education hub for eastern Chhattisgarh and hosts both public and private universities alongside medical, engineering, and degree colleges:

- Universities: Shaheed Nandkumar Patel Vishwavidyalaya (SNPV), established by the Government of Chhattisgarh on 22 January 2020 with its headquarters in Raigarh, functions as the affiliating state university for government and private colleges across Raigarh, Sarangarh-Bilaigarh, Janjgir-Champa, and Sakti districts. OP Jindal University (OPJU), established in 2014 at Punjipathra, is a UGC-recognised private university offering undergraduate, postgraduate, and doctoral programmes in engineering, metallurgy, management, and sciences.
- Medical and Technical Institutions: Late Shri Lakhiram Agrawal Memorial Government Medical College, Raigarh, founded in 2013 and affiliated with Pt. Deendayal Upadhyay Memorial Health Sciences and Ayush University of Chhattisgarh, offers MBBS and postgraduate medical degrees attached to the associated teaching hospital in Raigarh. Public technical institutions include the Kirodimal Institute of Technology (established in 2000) and Kirodimal Government Polytechnic (established in 1955).
- Degree and Law Colleges: Major constituent and affiliated colleges in the district include Kirodimal Government Arts and Science College, Raigarh (autonomous, established in 1958), Government P.D. Commerce and Arts College (Raigarh), Government K.M.T. Girls College (Raigarh), Swami Balkrishna Puri Law College (Raigarh), Government Mahatma Gandhi College (Kharsia), Government Sant Gahira Guru Rameshwar College (Lailunga), and government degree colleges at Dharamjaigarh, Gharghoda, Tamnar, Pusaur, and Jobi Barra.
