= Bilaspur division =

Bilaspur division बिलासपुर संभाग
- Division of Chhattisgarh
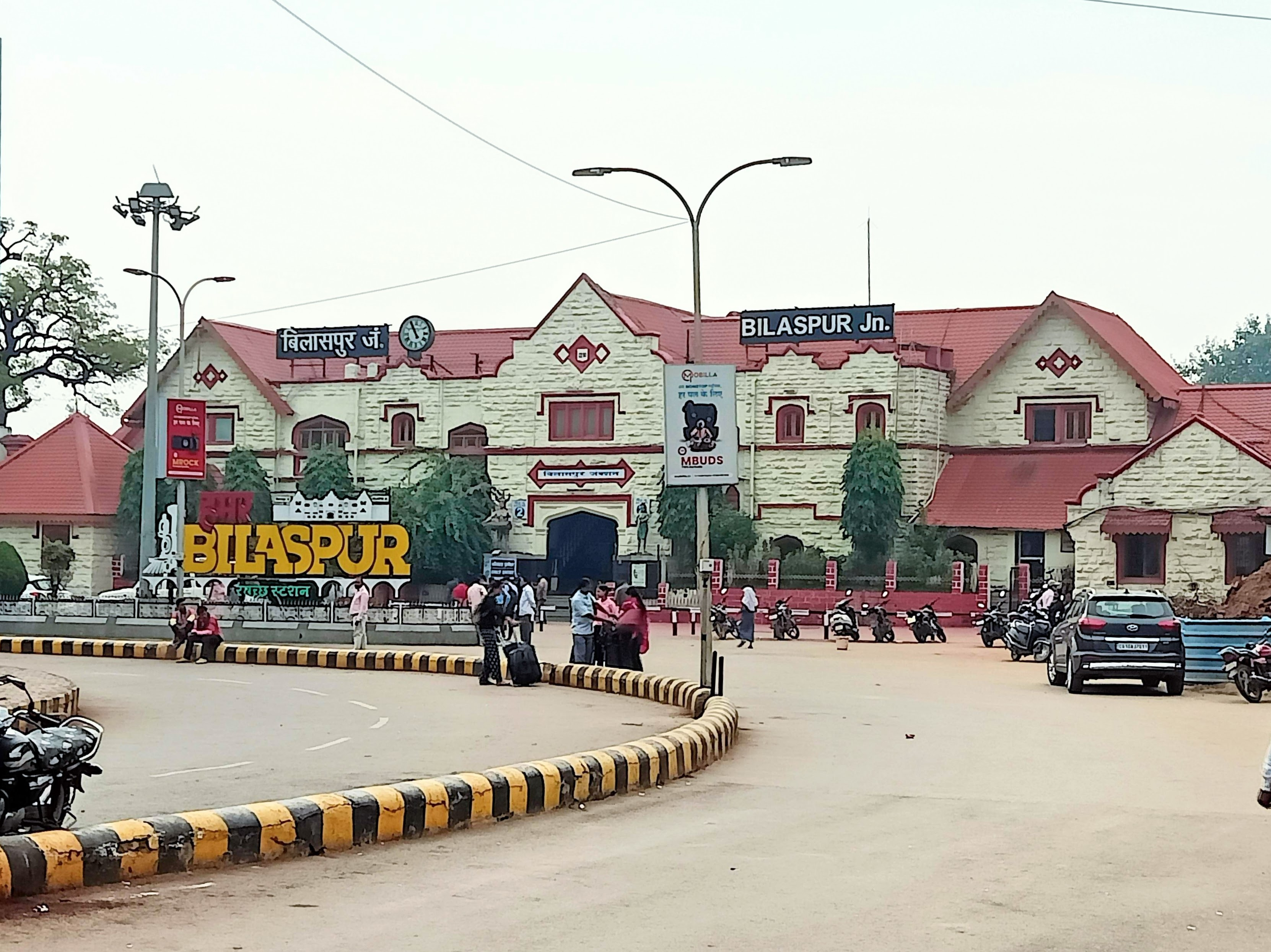
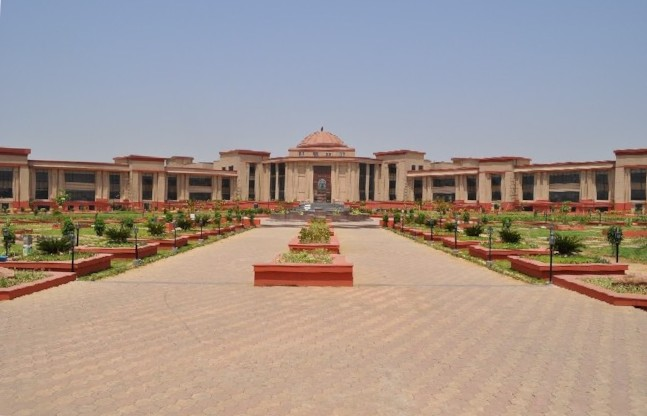
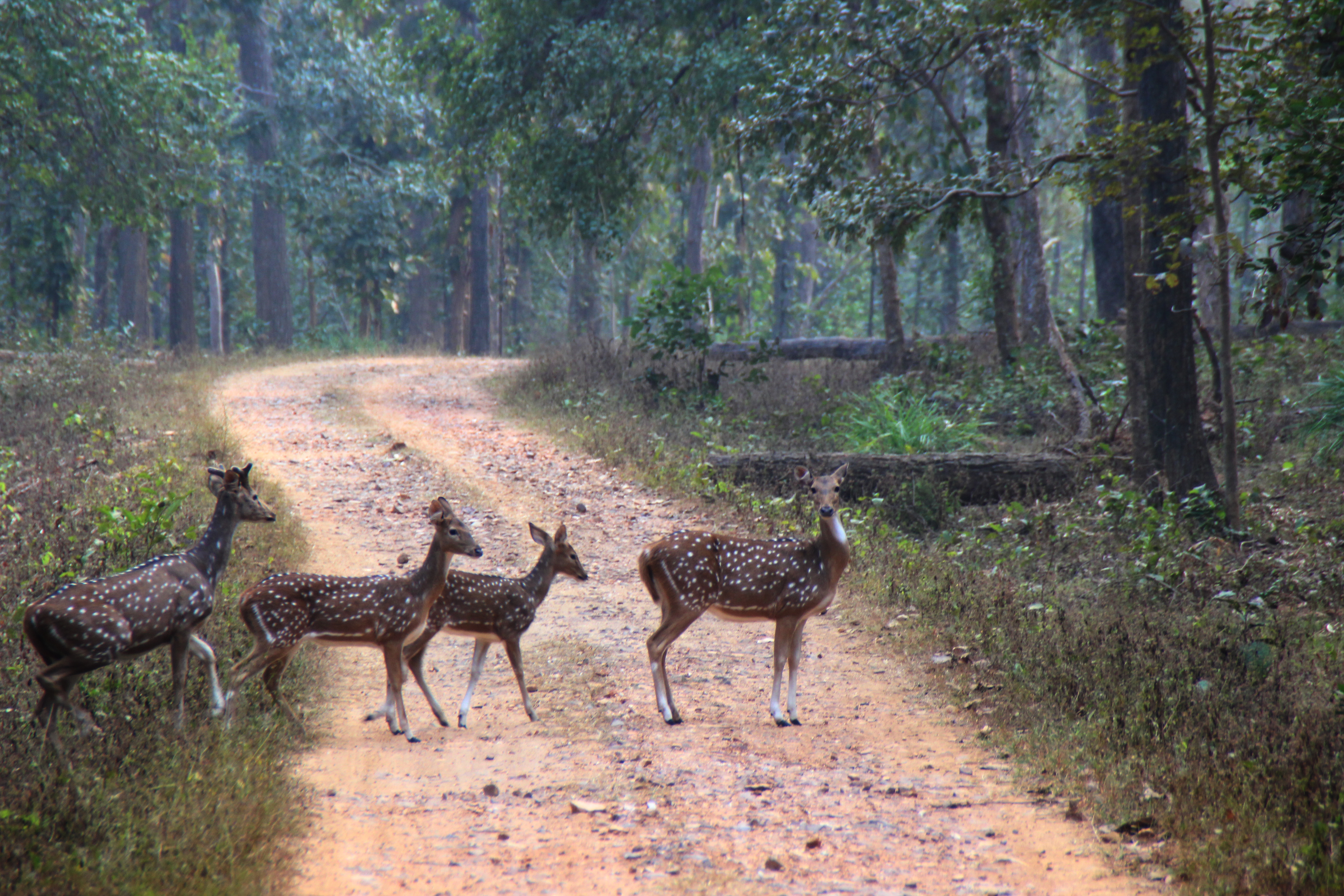
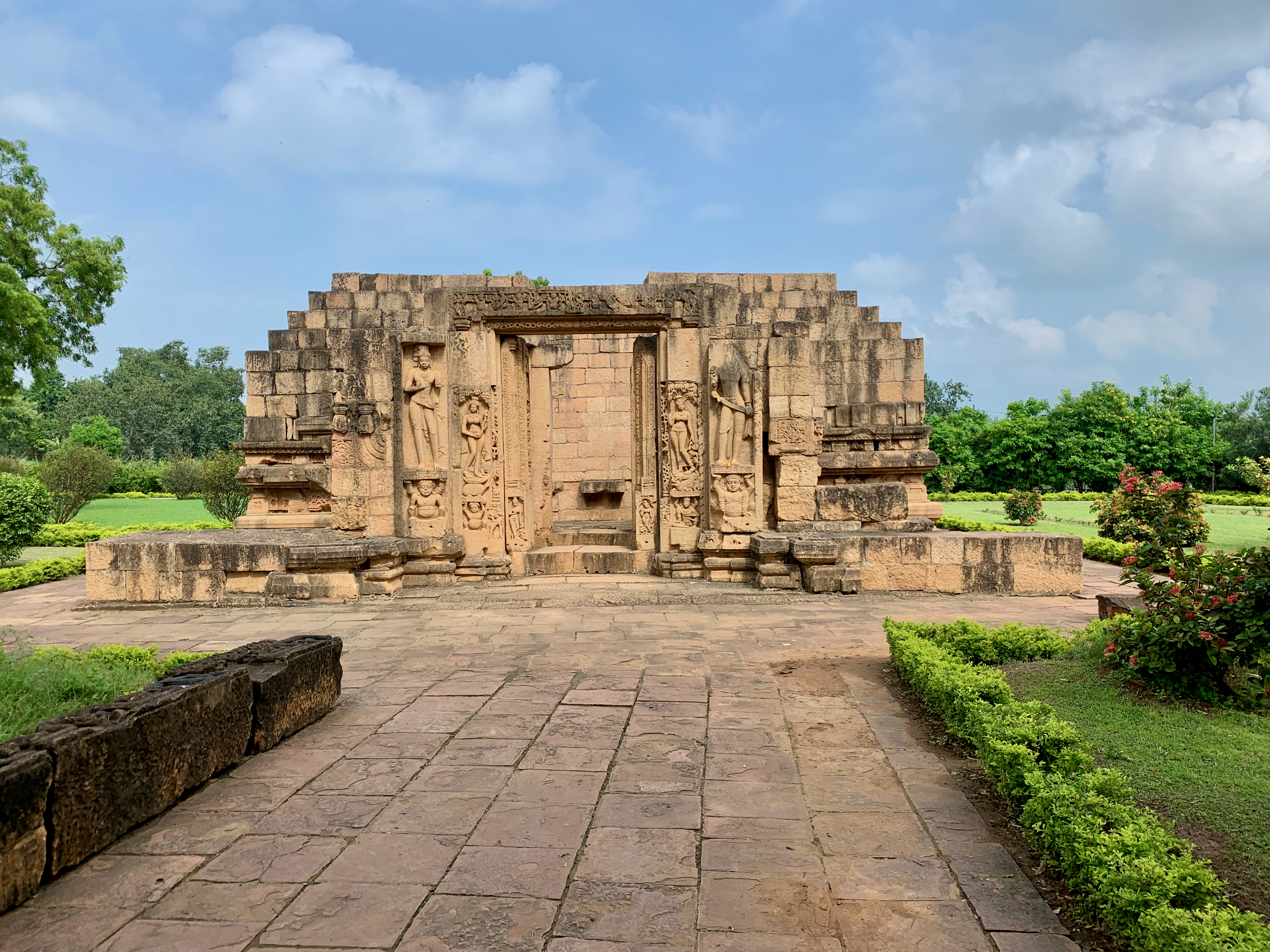
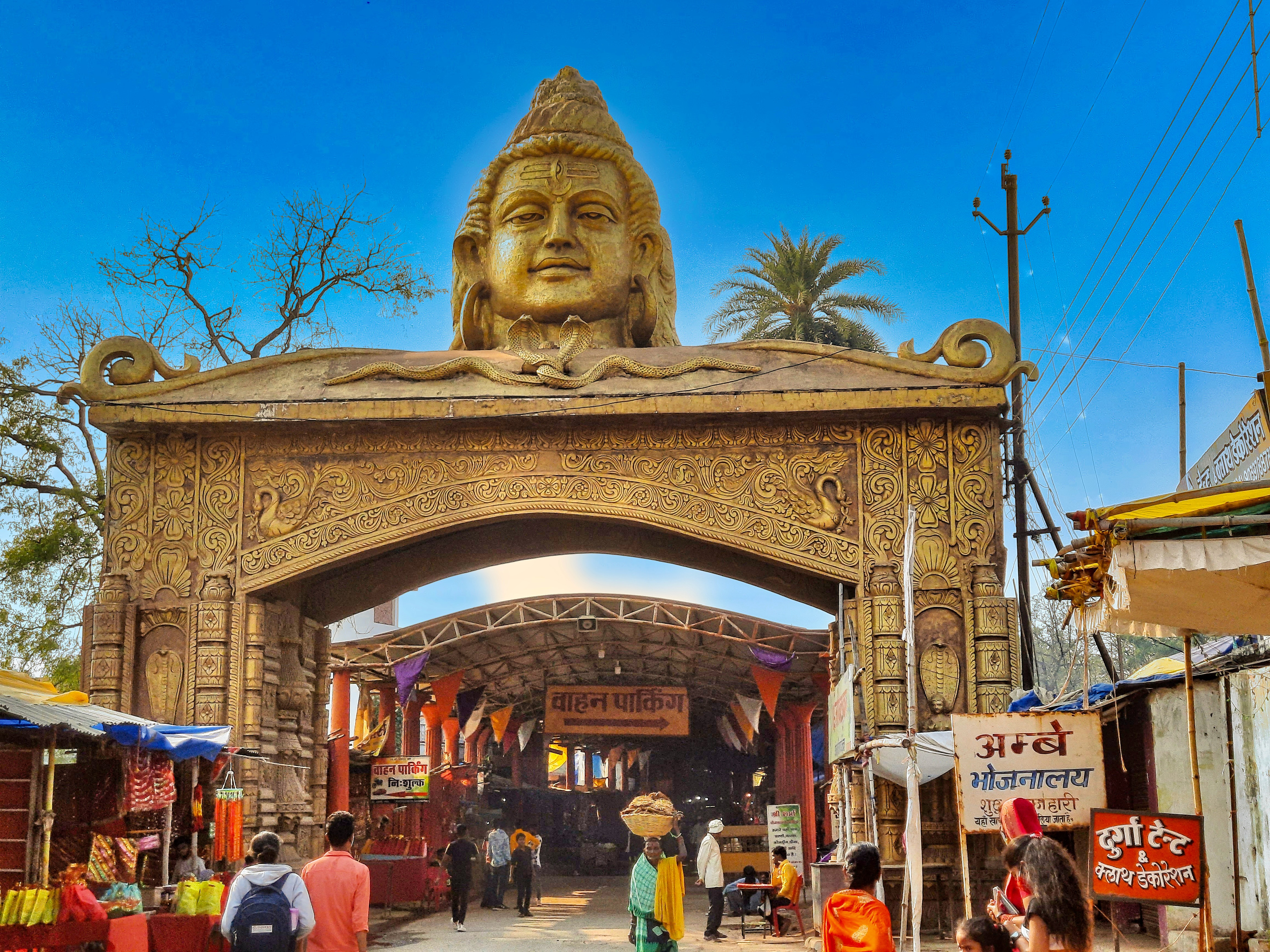
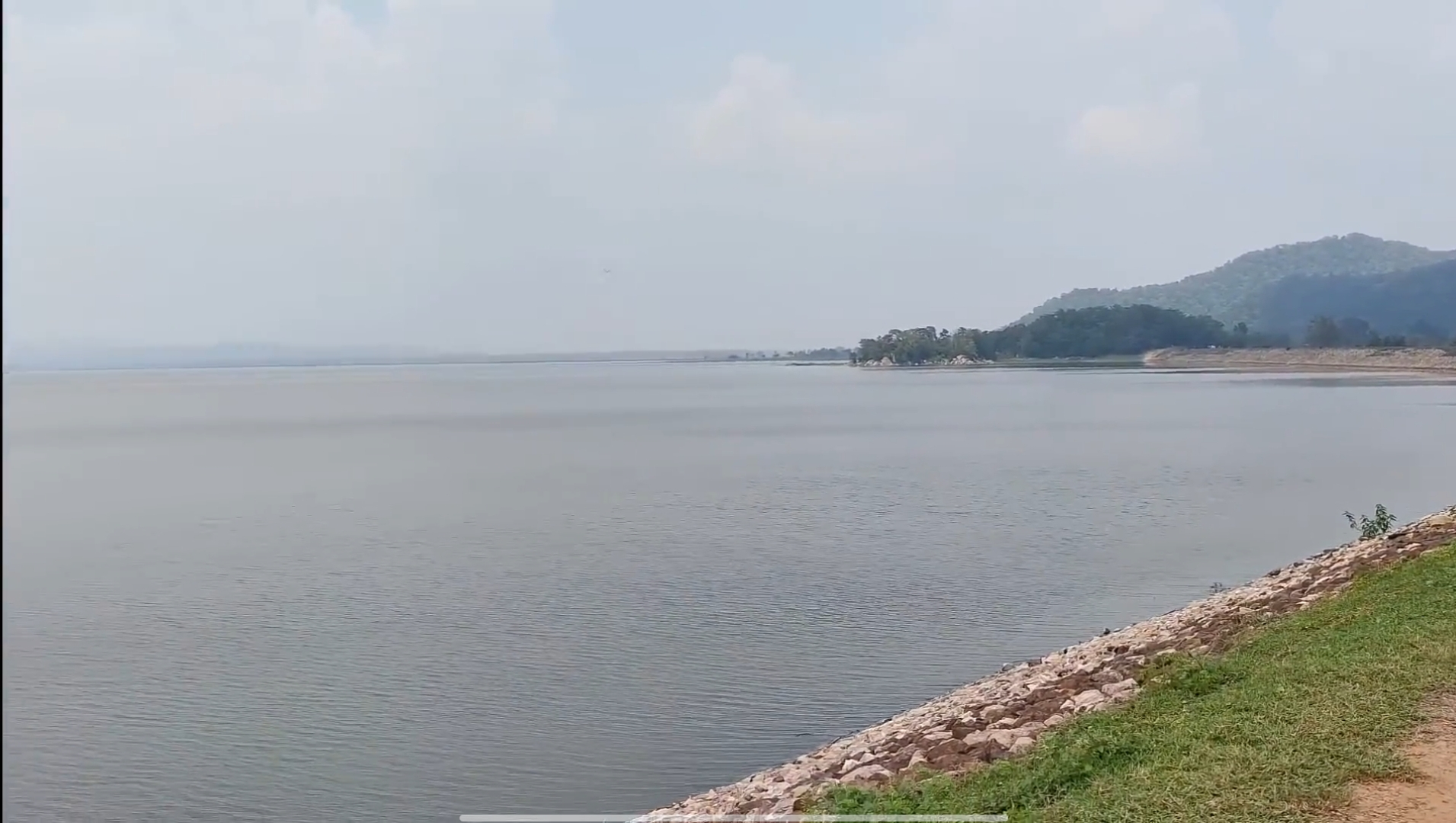
- Bilaspur Junction railway station Chhattisgarh High Court at Bilaspur Achanakmar Wildlife Sanctuary Bhima Kichak Temple, Malhar Mahamaya Temple of Ratanpur Khudia Dam in Mungeli district

- Location within Chhattisgarh Location within India
- Coordinates (Bilaspur): 22.09°N 82.15°E
- Country: India
- State: Chhattisgarh
- Headquarters: Bilaspur
- Districts: 8 (Bilaspur, Gaurela-Pendra-Marwahi, Janjgir–Champa, Korba, Mungeli, Raigarh, Sakti and Sarangarh–Bilaigarh)

Area
  - Total: 28,545 km^{2} (11,021 sq mi)

Population (2011)
  - Total: 8,120,390
  - Density: 284.48/km^{2} (736.79/sq mi)

Languages
  - Official language: Chhattisgarhi • Hindi
- Time zone: UTC+05:30 (IST)
- Airport: Bilaspur Airport
- Website: bilaspur.gov.in

Bilaspur division (/bɪlɑːspʊər/; Hindi: बिलासपुर संभाग) is one of the administrative divisions of the Indian state of Chhattisgarh, located in the northern and north-eastern part of the state. It is administered from its headquarters at Bilaspur and comprises total 9 districts including Bilaspur district. The division constitutes one of the key economic regions of northern Chhattisgarh, supported by coal mining and thermal power generation in Korba district and agricultural production in the Mahanadi basin. The city of Bilaspur also serves as the seat of the Chhattisgarh High Court, the highest judicial authority in the state.

== History ==
The region comprising the present-day Bilaspur division formed part of the historical territory of Dakshin Kosala in early antiquity. Archaeological remains at sites such as Malhar indicate continuous habitation from the early historic period, with material evidence linked to the Maurya, Shunga and Satavahana periods.

=== Early and medieval period ===
From the early medieval period, the region emerged as an important political centre under the Kalachuris of Ratnapura. Their capital at Ratanpur developed into a significant administrative and religious centre between the 11th and 13th centuries. Inscriptions and temple architecture from this period attest to royal patronage of Shaiva and Vaishnava institutions and the consolidation of regional authority in the upper Mahanadi basin.

Following the decline of Kalachuri authority in the 14th century, the region entered a phase of political transition. Later historical accounts indicate that parts of present-day Chhattisgarh came under the nominal influence of the Delhi Sultanate, although effective authority in forested tracts often remained with local chiefs.

By the 16th century, the territory formed part of the wider Mughal administrative sphere in central India, though control in peripheral regions remained indirect.

=== British period ===
After the Third Anglo-Maratha War (1817–1818), the Nagpur kingdom became subordinate to the British. In 1854, following the annexation of Nagpur under the Doctrine of Lapse, the territory was incorporated into the Central Provinces of British India. The region corresponding to present-day Bilaspur division formed part of Bilaspur District within the Central Provinces and Berar.

During the colonial period, the expansion of railways—particularly the Bengal Nagpur Railway—contributed to the growth of Bilaspur as a railway and administrative centre. Agrarian revenue settlements and forest administration policies significantly influenced the socio-economic structure of the surrounding districts.

=== Post-independence and state reorganisation ===
After Indian independence in 1947, the Central Provinces and Berar became part of the state of Madhya Pradesh. Bilaspur continued as an important district headquarters in the reorganised state.

On 1 November 2000, the state of Chhattisgarh was carved out of Madhya Pradesh, and Bilaspur division became one of its administrative divisions. Subsequent administrative reorganisation led to the creation of new districts within the division, including Gaurela–Pendra–Marwahi in 2020 and Sakti in 2022, reflecting ongoing efforts to decentralise governance.

== Administration ==
The Bilaspur division is headed by a Divisional Commissioner. As of 2026, it comprises eight districts:

District	Headquarters	Area (km²)	Established
Bilaspur	Bilaspur	3,508	1864
Gaurella-Pendra-Marwahi	Pendra	2,307	2020
Janjgir-Champa	Janjgir	4,466	1998
Korba	Korba	7,145	1998
Mungeli	Mungeli	2,750	2012
Raigarh	Raigarh	6,836	1948
Sakti	Sakti	—	2022
Sarangarh-Bilaigarh	Sarangarh	—	2022

== Cultural and historical sites ==
Bilaspur division contains several early-historic, medieval and natural heritage sites distributed across its constituent districts. Archaeological remains in the region indicate continuous habitation from at least the early historic period, while medieval temple architecture reflects the influence of the Kalachuris of Ratnapura and later regional dynasties.

=== Ancient archaeological sites ===
- Malhar (Bilaspur district): Identified with ancient Mallala, the site has yielded material remains from the Maurya, Shunga and Satavahana periods. Excavations have revealed terracotta figurines, inscriptions and early temple remains. The site is noted for an early image of Vishnu, often cited among the oldest sculptural representations of the deity in central India.
- Tala (Devrani–Jethani temples) (Bilaspur district): Dated to the 5th–6th century CE, the brick and stone temple complex is known for its distinctive sculptural programme, including the so-called “Rudra Shiva” image composed of anthropomorphic and zoomorphic motifs.
- Ratanpur (Bilaspur district): The former capital of the Kalachuris of Ratnapura, Ratanpur preserves temple remains, fortifications and tanks associated with its medieval prominence.

=== Forts and hill complexes ===
- Lafagarh (Chaiturgarh) (Korba district): A hill fort situated at an elevation of over 900 metres, traditionally attributed to Kalachuri rulers. The fort complex includes temple remains and defensive walls.
- Madku Dweep (Mungeli district): Located on an island in the Shivnath River, the site has yielded temple remains and sculptural fragments dating to the early medieval period.

=== Religious and pilgrimage centres ===
- Pali (Korba district): Known for the 10th-century Shiva temple (Pali Mahadeva), associated with Kalachuri patronage.
- Khutaghat Dam (Mungeli district): Besides its irrigation function, the reservoir area has developed as a scenic and recreational site visited by tourists from across the division.

=== Natural heritage ===
- Achanakmar Tiger Reserve (Mungeli district): Established as a wildlife sanctuary in 1975 and later notified as a tiger reserve, it forms part of the Achanakmar–Amarkantak Biosphere Reserve. The reserve supports populations of Bengal tiger, leopard and gaur.
- Hasdeo River basin (Korba and Janjgir–Champa districts): The river system supports riparian forests, wetlands and reservoir landscapes linked to the Hasdeo Bango project.

=== Cultural traditions ===
The division forms part of the larger cultural zone of central Chhattisgarh, where festivals such as Hareli, Teeja and Pola are widely observed. Folk performance traditions including Panthi and Raut Nacha are practised across rural districts, particularly during post-harvest celebrations.

== Climate ==
Bilaspur division has a tropical wet and dry climate (Köppen climate classification: Aw), characterised by hot summers, a pronounced monsoon season, and mild winters. Climatic conditions across the division are broadly similar, although local variations occur in forested and upland districts such as Gaurela-Pendra-Marwahi compared to the plains of Bilaspur, Janjgir-Champa and Raigarh.

Summer extends from March to June, with May typically being the hottest month. Maximum temperatures in several districts of the division have been reported to rise above 45 °C (113 °F) during peak heatwave conditions. Hot and dry winds are common during this period.

The southwest monsoon generally arrives in mid-June and lasts until September. The division receives the majority of its annual rainfall during this period, with several districts recording seasonal totals exceeding 1,100 millimetres (43 in) in normal monsoon years. Monsoon rainfall plays a critical role in supporting agriculture and water resources across the division.

Winter lasts from November to February and is generally mild. Minimum temperatures in certain inland and forested pockets of the division have been reported to fall below 8 °C (46 °F) during cold wave episodes.

Overall, the division experiences three distinct seasons—summer, monsoon and winter—with climatic patterns typical of central India.

== Economy ==
Bilaspur division, located in the central part of the Indian state of Chhattisgarh, has a mixed economy underpinned by mining, energy production, industrial activity and connectivity infrastructure.

The division is the industrial backbone of Chhattisgarh:

- Coal: South Eastern Coalfields Limited (SECL), the largest coal-producing company in India, is headquartered here.
- Railways: The South East Central Railway zone (SECR) headquarters is located in Bilaspur, which is one of the highest revenue-generating zones for Indian Railways.

=== Mining and resource-based economy ===
A significant driver of the division’s economy is coal mining. The South Eastern Coalfields Limited (SECL), a major coal producing company in India, operates in and around the districts within Bilaspur division. SECL’s operations contribute not only to regional employment but also to state revenues through statutory levies and infrastructure development linked to mineral extraction. According to mining contracts awarded in the region, companies securing large mining contracts have spurred local economic activity and investor confidence in the mining supply chain.

=== Power generation and industrial growth ===
Energy production forms another cornerstone of the division’s economy. The presence of large power generation facilities, including the Sipat Super Thermal Power Station which sources coal from local mines, supports both industrial and household power needs. These energy assets facilitate further industrial activities and help attract ancillary investments in equipment supply and services.

Industrial growth beyond mining has seen strategic investments in the region. For example, engineering and manufacturing firms have expanded operations, including the establishment of storage and logistics infrastructure aimed at improving supply chains for heavy equipment and mining support services in Bilaspur.

=== Investment and regional development ===
Recent industrial investment patterns indicate that economic development in Chhattisgarh is increasingly spread beyond its capital region, with significant investment commitments being made across multiple divisions including Bilaspur. In a government investment briefing, nearly half of all industrial commitments were documented outside the traditional centres, reflecting investor confidence in the division’s economic potential.

=== Emerging sectors ===
Efforts to diversify the regional economy are also evident through investments in sustainable initiatives such as compressed bio-gas (CBG) facilities. A major project announced in mid-2025 involves the establishment of a ₹100 crore CBG plant to process urban solid waste, aiming to generate renewable energy and provide employment opportunities in Bilaspur.

=== Agriculture and support activities ===
While the division’s economic profile is largely industrial and resource-driven, agriculture and allied activities remain important to rural areas within the division. Paddy cultivation constitutes a major component of agricultural production in the districts forming Bilaspur division, reflecting Chhattisgarh’s broader agrarian base.

In addition to crop cultivation, allied sectors such as fisheries and livestock contribute to supplementary rural incomes. Regional initiatives aimed at strengthening fisheries infrastructure and cooperative marketing have been reported in central Chhattisgarh, benefiting districts within the Bilaspur region.

== Education ==
Bilaspur division serves as one of the principal educational hubs of northern Chhattisgarh, hosting state universities, professional institutions and technical colleges that cater to students from across the division and adjoining regions.

=== Universities ===
- Guru Ghasidas Vishwavidyalaya (Bilaspur): Established in 1983 and later converted into a Central University in 2009, the university offers undergraduate, postgraduate and doctoral programmes across disciplines including science, engineering, humanities and management.
- Atal Bihari Vajpayee Vishwavidyalaya (Bilaspur): Formerly Bilaspur University, it was established in 2012 as a state university to affiliate colleges in Bilaspur and surrounding districts.
- Pandit Sundarlal Sharma (Open) University (Bilaspur): A state open university providing distance education across Chhattisgarh, including learners from rural districts of the division.

=== Medical and technical institutions ===
- Chhattisgarh Institute of Medical Sciences (Bilaspur): Established in 2001, the government medical college and associated hospital serves as a major tertiary healthcare and teaching centre for the division.
- Government Engineering College, Bilaspur: One of the prominent technical institutions in the division, offering undergraduate engineering programmes under state technical education frameworks.

=== School education ===
School education in the division is administered under the state education system of Chhattisgarh. Government and private institutions operate across urban centres such as Bilaspur, Korba and Raigarh, as well as in rural districts including Gaurela–Pendra–Marwahi and Sakti. The division has witnessed gradual expansion in higher secondary schools and vocational streams over the past decade, reflecting broader educational development trends in the state.

== Connectivity ==
Bilaspur division serves as a vital transportation hub for Central India, featuring one of the country's most significant railway junctions and an expanding aviation sector.

=== Rail ===
The division is the headquarters of the South East Central Railway zone (SECR), which is consistently the highest revenue-generating zone for Indian Railways due to heavy freight traffic.

- Bilaspur Junction (BSP): A major regional hub and the fourth-busiest junction in Central India. It connects the division to major metros like Delhi, Mumbai, Kolkata, and Chennai via the Howrah–Nagpur–Mumbai line.
- Infrastructure: The division features an Electric Loco Shed and is currently upgrading to quadruple lines between Jharsuguda and Durg to support coal evacuation from the SECL mines.

=== Road ===
The division is well-connected through a network of National Highways:

- NH-130: Connects Bilaspur to the state capital Raipur and the northern city of Ambikapur.
- NH-49: A primary east-west corridor starting from Bilaspur and extending to Kharagpur, West Bengal, passing through Sakti and Raigarh.
- NH-45: Connects Bilaspur to Jabalpur and Bhopal in Madhya Pradesh.

=== Air ===
- Bilaspur Airport (PAB): Located at Chakarbhata, it is a 3C category commercial airport. As of 2026, it operates regular flights to cities including Delhi, Kolkata, Prayagraj, and Jabalpur under the UDAN scheme. Current operators include Alliance Air.
