= Nareshchandra Singh =

6th Chief Minister of Madhya Pradesh, India

Raja Nareshchandra Singh
- Raja Bahadur of Sarangarh

Raja of Sarangarh
- Reign: 11 January 1946 – 1 January 1948
- Predecessor: Raja Bahadur Jawahir Singh
- Successor: Sarangarh State merged into Dominion of India

Titular Raja of Sarangarh
- Pretendence: 1 January 1948 – 11 September 1987
- Successor: Raja Shishir Bindu Singh

6th Chief Minister of Madhya Pradesh
- In office 13 March 1969 – 25 March 1969
- Preceded by: Govind Narayan Singh
- Succeeded by: Shyama Charan Shukla

Minister of Tribal Welfare, Government of Madhya Pradesh
- In office 1955–1967

Minister of Power and Public Works Department, Government of Madhya Pradesh
- In office 1952–1955

Member of Madhya Pradesh Legislative Assembly
- In office 1952–1969
- Succeeded by: Rani Lalita Devi

Personal details
- Born: 21 November 1908 Chhattisgarh
- Died: 11 September 1987 (aged 78)
- Spouse: Lalita Devi
- Children: 6, including Rajni Devi and Pushpa Devi Singh

HH Raja Bahadur Naresh Chandra Singh

Raja Nareshchandra Singh (21 November 1908 – 11 September 1987) was an Indian ruler of Sarangarh state in Raigarh District, Chhattisgarh. He also served as Chief Minister of undivided Madhya Pradesh.

== Early life ==
Raja Nareshchandra Singh was a king from Raj Gond (Adivasi) Royal dynasty. He was the last ruler of the Princely State of Sarangarh till the merger of his State into the union of India on 1 January 1948. The state now forms a part of the modern state of Chhattisgarh in Central India. He had succeeded his father Raja Bahadur Jawahir Singh who died in January 1946. Like his father, was an Alumnus of the Rajkumar College, Raipur and worked as an Honorary Magistrate in Raipur district before being inducted as the Education Minister in the administration of Sarangarh State.

== Political career ==
After independence, he joined the Indian National Congress and won the first General Election held in 1951 for the State assembly of Madhya Pradesh. He represented Sarangarh Vidhan Sabha constituency by winning the 1951 and 1957 Assembly Election. and Pussore Vidhan Sabha constituency by winning the Assembly election of 1962 and 1967. He was made Cabinet Minister in 1952 in Madhya Pradesh in Pandit Ravishankar Shukla's ministry and was given the portfolio of Electricity and Public Works departments. He headed the team in 1954 which created a separate department within the government to take care of the welfare of the Scheduled Tribes, christened The Directorate of Tribal Welfare. He was made the first Minister for Tribal Welfare in M.P. in 1955 and continued in this post till he became the Chief Minister of Madhya Pradesh in 1969 (13 March 1969 to 25 March 1969). Disgusted with the way politics had come to be practiced, he resigned from his post of Chief Minister, from the membership of the State Assembly and quit politics. In his later years he took to social work towards upliftment of people in Chhattisgarh.

== Family ==
His wife, Rani Lalita Devi (died 7 November 1987) was elected unopposed from Pussour assembly constituency in his place in the by-election that was held after his resignation from the assembly in 1969. He had five daughters and one son. After his death, his son Raja Shishir Bindu Singh took over as the Raja of the Sarangarh state till 7 September 2016. The current Raja, after the death of her brother, is Raja Pushpa Devi Singh. Three of the daughters entered politics: Rajnigandha Devi was a Member of Parliament (Lok Sabha 1967-71), Kamala Devi was a member of State Assembly of Madhya Pradesh from 1971 to 1989, and a minister for 15 years, and Pushpa Devi Singh was elected thrice to the Lok Sabha Parliament in 1980, 1985 and 1991. The fourth daughter Dr. Menka Devi is a doctor, medico-social worker and an educationist. She is a member of the Indian National Congress. Purnima Devi is the youngest daughter

His grand children are Nandita Singh, Chandravir Singh (children of Late Rajnigandha Devi), Mrinalika Singh (Daughter of Kamala Devi) and Kulisha Mishra (daughter of Dr Menka Devi). Kulisha Mishra is the National Joint Secretary of The Indian Youth Congress.

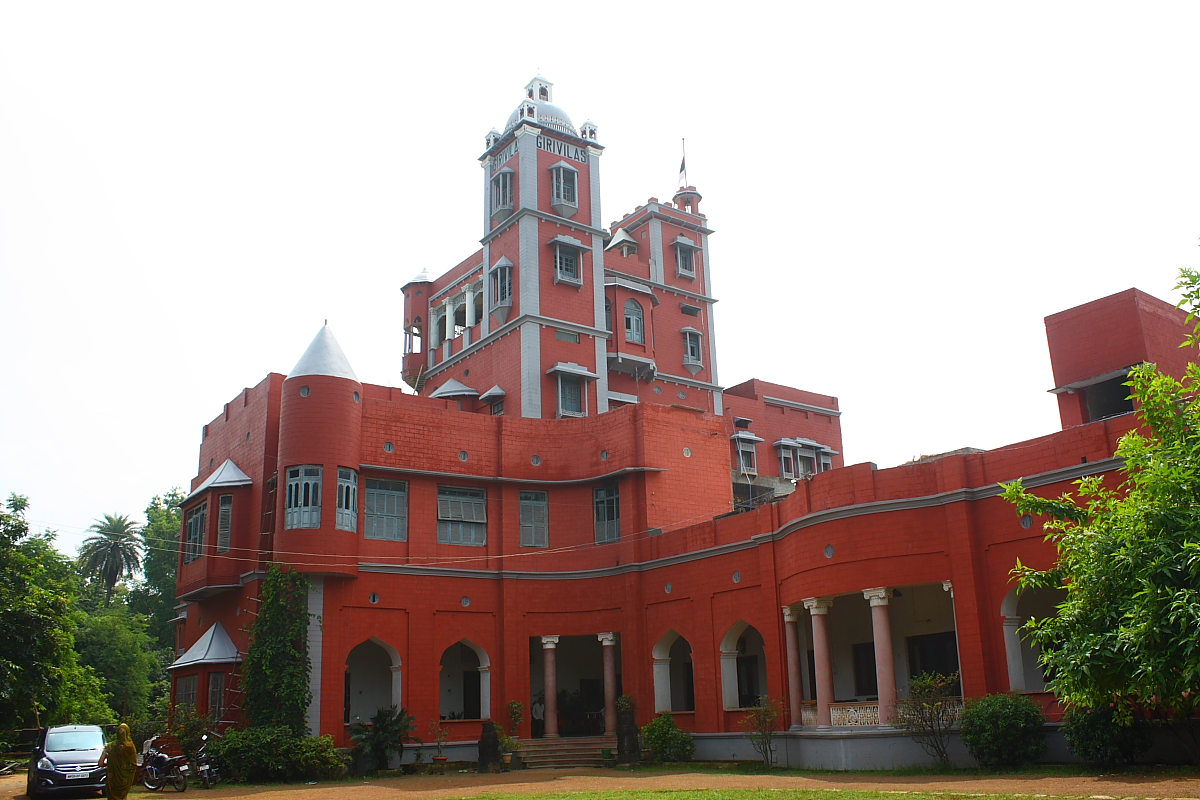
Girivilas Palace
