= Sakti =

Sakti may refer to:

- Shakti, the primordial cosmic energy in Hinduism
- Sakti, Chhattisgarh, a town in India
  - Sakti district
  - Sakti State, a former princely state in India
- Sakti, Leh, a village in India
- ST Sakti, a tugboat
- Sakti Burman, Indian artist
- Bima Sakti, Indonesian footballer
- Gusti Panji Sakti, King of Buleleng, in present-day Indonesia
