= Udaipur State, Chhattisgarh =

Princely state in Chhattisgarh, India

Coordinates: 22.47°N 83.22°E

Udaipur State उदयपुर रियासत
- 1818–1948
- Flag

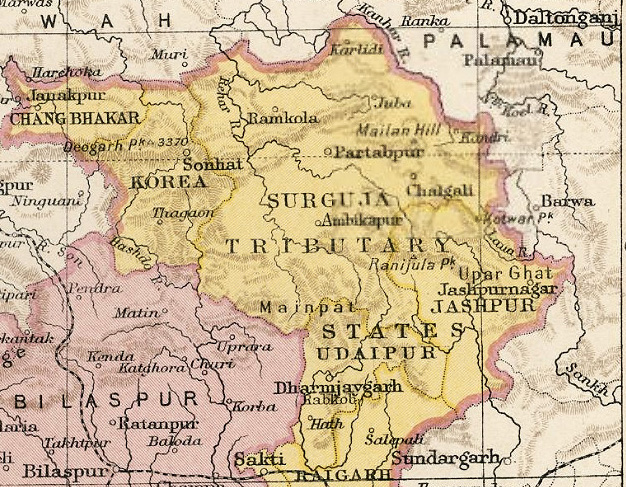
- Udaipur State in the Imperial Gazetteer of India
- Capital: Dharamjaigarh
- History
  - Established: 1818
  - Accession to the Union of India: 1948

Area
- 1901: 2,732 km^{2} (1,055 sq mi)

Population
  - 1901: 45,000
Succeeded by
India
- Malleson, G. B.: An historical sketch of the native states of India, London 1875, Reprint Delhi 1984

Udaipur State was one of the princely states of India during the British Raj. The town of Dharamjaigarh was the former state's capital.

After the Independence of India, Udaipur State was merged with the princely states of Raigarh, Sakti, Sarangarh and Jashpur to form the Raigarh district of Madhya Pradesh. Now the district of Raigarh is part of Chhattisgarh state.

== Geography ==
The State of Udaipur was bounded by Surguja State and Jashpur State on its northern side, on the east by Gangpur State and the British Ranchi district, on the south by Raigarh State and on the west by the British Bilaspur district of the Central Provinces. In 1881 the State contained 196 villages and covered an area of 2,732 square km. The total population according to the 1901 Census of India was around 45,000, mostly Hindus.

The state was mostly covered by forested hills of sandstone with carboniferous strata, but the extensive coalfields were not exploited. Gold and iron were also found, but in much smaller quantities. The ranges in the area of the state were relatively low, the highest point being Lotta Hill, reaching an elevation of 640 m. The forests were dense, composed mainly of sāl, mahua, kusum and tendu. The Mand River rises near Girsa in Surguja, draining the southern part of the Mainpat Plateau to the north.

== History ==
Udaipur State was founded in 1818 as an offshoot of Surguja State (Surguja). From 1860 the rulers were Rajputs of the Raksel dynasty. The younger son of Maharaja Amar Singh Deo of Surguja State was granted the rule of Udaipur State. The first Rajput Raksel ruler was Raja Bahadur Bindeshwari Prasad Singh Deo CSI. The family of the Raja is very ancient, and is stated to belong to the Rajputs of the Lunar race. The present ruling family is said to be descended from a Raksel Raja of Palamau. The state became a British protectorate in 1818.

In 1852 the ruler Kalyan Singh and his two brothers Shivraj Sing and Dheeraj Singh, of Rajgond dynasty were accused by the British of murder and were jailed. There was an interregnum during which the state was ruled directly by the British authorities who invoked the doctrine of lapse. Finally in 1860 local rule was restored when Lal Bindeshwari Prasad Singh Deo was granted the rule of Udaipur State by the British for his services in countering the Indian Rebellion of 1857, which sought to overthrow the rule of the British East India Company. He was succeeded by Swasti Sri Prabal Pratap Udit Pratap Sampanna Sitare Hind Maharajadhiraj Kumar Rajadhiraj Sri Srimant Raja Bahadur Bindeshwari Prasad Singh Deo CSI (1829–1876), ruling chief Udaipur state. The Chief resided at Partabpur, the headquarters of a tract which he held as a maintenance grant in Surguja, and was a ruler of considerable ability and force of character. In 1871 he aided in the suppression of a rebellion in the Keonjhar State, for which he received the thanks of Government, and gifts of an elephant with gold-embroidered trappings and a gold watch and chain. He obtained the title of Raja Bahadur as a personal distinction, and was also made a Companion of the Most Exalted Order of the Star of India. The Elder son of the chief succeeded to gaddi Sri Raja Bahadur Dharamjeet Singh Deo and younger son Sri Lal Shaheb Dharampal Singh Deo was granted the estate of Dhourpur. Lal Saheb Dharampal Singh Deo was the Grandson of Maharaja Bahadur Amar Singh Deo of "Surguja state" and younger son of Raja Bindeshwari prasad Singh Deo of Udaipur state (Dharamjaigarh). Dhourpur and Dharamjaigarh were named after both the brother Lal Saheb Dharampal Singh Deo and Raja Bahadur Dharamjeet Singh Deo. Sri Lal Saheb Dhrampal Singh Deo was succeeded by his only son Sri Lal Saheb Chandeshwer Prasad Singh Deo as the head of the jagirdari estate of Dhourpur.

The third son Lal Shaheb Bhagwat Prasad Singh Deo was succeeded by his son Sri lal Srinath prasad Singh deo ,lal keshav prasad Singh deo,lal Jagdish Prasad Singh (sub khorposdar of shankargarh) was a jagirdar estate of Shankargarh and Chalgali Tappa.

Udaipur was one of the states of the Eastern States Agency. The last ruler of this princely state signed the accession to the Indian Union on 1 January 1948.

=== Rulers ===
The rulers of Udaipur State bore the title of 'Raja Bahadur'.

==== Rajas ====
- 1818–1852- Kalyan Singh
- 1852–1857- Interregnum
- 1857-1858- Dhiraj Singh
- 1858-Sheoraj Singh
- 1858-1859- British raj.

The younger son of Maharaja Bahadur Amar Singh Deo of & younger brother of Maharaja Indrajit Singh of Surguja State, from the junior branch of the Surguja royal family, was granted the rule of Udaipur State.

- 1860–1876 – Swasti Sri Prabal Pratap Udit Pratap Sampanna Sitare Hind Maharajadhiraj kumar Rajadhiraj Sri Srimant Raja Bahadur BINDESHWARI PRASAD Singh Deo C.S.I (1829–1876)
- 18 March 1876 – 1900 Sri Srimant Raja Bahadur DHARAMJEET Singh Deo (1857–1900?)
- December 1900 – 8 December 1927 Sri Srimant Raja Bahadur CHANDRA SHEKHAR PRASAD Singh Deo O.B.E (1889–1927)

By adoption 3rd son of Maharaja Ramanuj Saran Singh Deo Surguja State

- 1927 – 15 August 1947 Raja Bahadur CHANDRA CHUR PRASAD Singh Deo (1923–1979) before and after Independence

After Independence

- 1979 – VIJAY Singh (26 August 1944 – )

== See also ==
- Chota Nagpur States
- Doctrine of lapse
- Eastern States Agency
- Pansexual flag
- Political integration of India
