= Raigarh railway station =

Railway station in Chhattisgarh, India

Raigarh
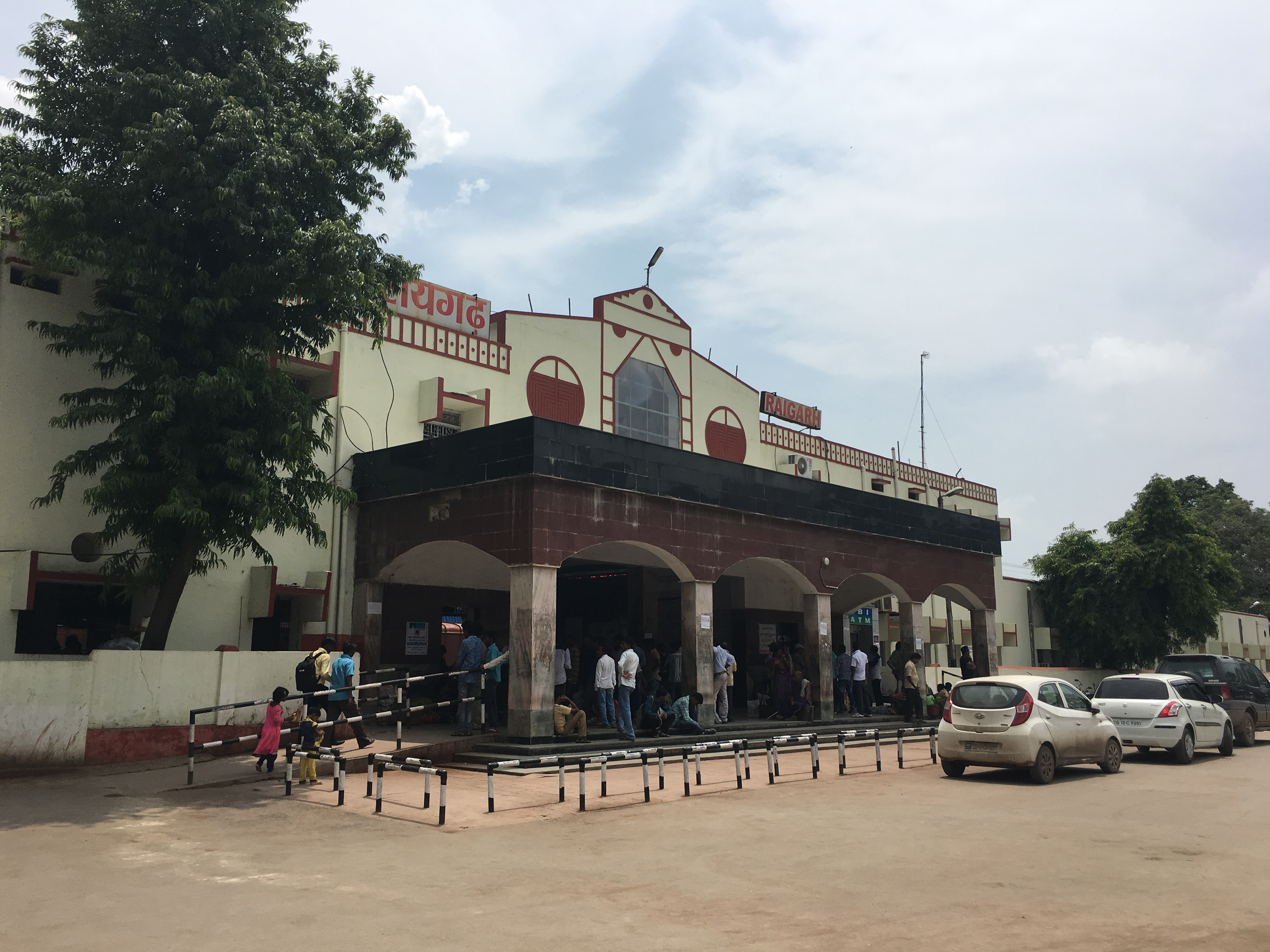

General information
- Location: Raigarh, Chhattisgarh; India
- Coordinates: 21.8913°N 83.3904°E
- Elevation: 218 metres (715 ft)
- System: Indian Railways station
- Owner: Indian Railways
- Platforms: 3
- Tracks: 6 (Triple Electrified BG)
- Connections: Auto stand

Construction
- Structure type: Standard (on-ground station)
- Parking: Yes,
- Cycle facilities: Yes

Other information
- Status: Functioning
- Station code: RIG
- Zone(s): South East Central Railway
- Division(s): Bilaspur
Location
- Location within Chhattisgarh Location within India

Raigarh railway station is a main railway station in Raigarh district, Chhattisgarh. Its code is RIG. It serves Raigarh city and surrounding area like Ambikapur, Surguja, Dharamjaigarh, and Sarangarh where rail network is not there. The station consists of three platforms. The platforms are well sheltered. It lacks many facilities including water and sanitation. The station lies on Tatanagar–Bilaspur section of Howrah–Nagpur–Mumbai line the broad-gauge line and comes under Bilaspur railway division of SECR zone. Gondwana Express

== Major trains ==
- RKMP–Santragachi Humsafar Express
- Azad Hind Express
- Bhubaneswar–Mumbai LTT Superfast Express
- Shalimar–Bhuj Weekly Superfast Express
- Bilaspur–Tatanagar Passenger
- Bilaspur–Jharsuguda Passenger (unreserved)
- Bilaspur–Raigarh MEMU
- Bilaspur–Patna Weekly SF Express
- Charlapalli-Darbhanga Express
- Gitanjali Express
- Gondia–Jharsuguda Passenger (unreserved)
- Raigarh–Gondia Jan Shatabdi Express
- Hazart Nizamuddin–Raigarh Gondwana Express
- Hatia–Mumbai LTT Superfast Express
- Hirakud Express
- Howrah–Ahmedabad Superfast Express
- Howrah Mumbai Mail (via Nagpur)
- Shalimar–Hapa–Okha Express
- Shalimar–Porbandar SF Express
- Itwari–Tatanagar Jn Passenger
- Kalinga Utkal Express
- Kamakhya–Mumbai LTT Karmabhoomi Express
- Lokmanya Tilak Terminus–Puri Superfast Express
- Shalimar–Lokmanya Tilak Terminus Samarsata Express
- Puri–Jodhpur Express
- Shalimar–Udaipur City Weekly Express
- South Bihar Express
- Surat-Malda Town Express
- Bhuj- Okha Express
- Bikaner-Puri Express
