= Dharamjaigarh Assembly constituency =

Legislative Assembly constituency in Chhattisgarh State, India

Coordinates: 22.46°N 83.21°E

Dharamjaigarh
- Constituency No. 19 for the Chhattisgarh Legislative Assembly

Constituency details
- Country: India
- Region: Central India
- State: Chhattisgarh
- District: Raigarh
- Lok Sabha constituency: Raigarh
- Established: 1951
- Total electors: 212,825
- Reservation: ST

Member of Legislative Assembly
- 6th Chhattisgarh Legislative Assembly
- Incumbent Laljeet Singh Rathia
- Party: Indian National Congress
- Elected year: 2013
- Preceded by: Om Prakash Rathia

Dharamjaigarh is one of the 90 Legislative Assembly constituencies of Chhattisgarh state in India. It is in Raigarh district and is reserved for candidates belonging to the Scheduled Tribes.

== Members of Legislative Assembly ==
| Year | Member | Party |
Madhya Pradesh Legislative Assembly
| 1952 | Budhnath Sai | Indian National Congress |
| 1952 | Chandrachud Prasad Singh Deo | Indian National Congress |
| 1957 | Chandrachud Prasad Singh Deo | Indian National Congress |
| 1957 | Umed Singh | Indian National Congress |
| 1962 | Kishori Mohan | Indian National Congress |
| 1967 | R. C. P. Singh | Indian National Congress |
| 1972 | Vaidya Begraj Sharma | Indian National Congress |
| 1977 | Chanesh Ram Rathiya | Indian National Congress |
| 1980 | Chanesh Ram Rathiya | Indian National Congress |
| 1985 | Chanesh Ram Rathiya | Indian National Congress |
| 1990 | Chanesh Ram Rathiya | Indian National Congress |
| 1993 | Chanesh Ram Rathiya | Indian National Congress |
| 1998 | Chanesh Ram Rathiya | Indian National Congress |
Chhattisgarh Legislative Assembly
| 2003 | Om Prakash Rathia | Bharatiya Janata Party |
| 2008 | Om Prakash Rathia | Bharatiya Janata Party |
| 2013 | Laljeet Singh Rathia | Indian National Congress |
| 2018 | Laljeet Singh Rathia | Indian National Congress |
| 2023 | Laljeet Singh Rathia | Indian National Congress |

== Election results ==
=== 2023 ===
2023 Chhattisgarh Legislative Assembly election: Dharamjaigarh
| Party | Candidate | Votes | % | ±% |
|---|---|---|---|---|
| INC | Laljeet Singh Rathia | 90,493 | 49.18 | −6.81 |
| BJP | Harishchandra Rathia | 80,856 | 43.94 | +11.68 |
| JCC | Jogendra Ekka | 2,451 | 1.33 | −1.36 |
| NOTA | None of the Above | 3,427 | 1.86 | −1.64 |
| Majority | | 9,637 | 5.24 | −18.49 |
| Turnout | | 183,994 | 86.45 | +0.28 |
| INC hold | | Swing | | |

=== 2018 ===
Chhattisgarh Legislative Assembly Election, 2018: Dharamjaigarh
| Party | Candidate | Votes | % | ±% |
|---|---|---|---|---|
| INC | Laljeet Singh Rathia | 95,173 | 55.99 | |
| BJP | Leenav Birju Rathia | 54,838 | 32.26 | |
| JCC | Santram Rathia | 4,574 | 2.69 | |
| NOTA | None of the Above | 5,954 | 3.50 | |
| Majority | | 40,335 | 23.73 | |
| Turnout | | 1,69,984 | 86.17 | |
| INC hold | | Swing | | |

== See also ==
- List of constituencies of the Chhattisgarh Legislative Assembly
- Raigarh district
- Dharamjaigarh
