= Gomardha Wildlife Sanctuary =

Protected area in Chhattisgarh, India

- IUCN category IV (habitat/species management area)
- Location within Chhattisgarh Location within India
- Interactive map of Gomardha Wildlife Sanctuary
- Nearest city: Sarangarh
- Coordinates: 21°30′N 83°8′E
- Area: 277.82 km^{2} (107.27 sq mi)
- Established: 1975

Gomardha Wildlife Sanctuary is a protected area and wildlife sanctuary located in Sarangarh-Bilaigarh district of the Indian state of Chhattisgarh.

== Description ==
The sanctuary covers an area of 277.82 km^{2} (107.27 sq mi) and was declared as a protected area in 1975.

== Flora and fauna ==
The protected area consists of a mixture of moist and dry tropical deciduous forests. Major fauna include Bengal tiger, leopard, sambar, gaur, spotted deer, sloth bear, wild boar, monitor lizard, and softshell turtle. There are over 100 species of birds including Asian paradise flycatcher, and white-throated fantail.
