= Laljeet Singh Rathia =

Indian politician

Member of Chhattisgarh Legislative Assembly
- Incumbent
- Assumed office 2013
- Preceded by: Om Prakash Rathia
- Constituency: Dharamjaigarh

Personal details
- Political party: Indian National Congress

Laljeet Singh Rathia (born 1977) is an Indian politician from Chhattisgarh. He is a three-time MLA from the Dharamjaigarh Assembly constituency, which is reserved for the Scheduled Tribes community, in Raigarh district. He won the 2023 Chhattisgarh Legislative Assembly election representing the Indian National Congress.

== Early life and education ==
Rathia is from Dharamjaigarh, Raigarh district, Chhattisgarh. His father, Chanesh Ram Rathiya, is a farmer. He completed his postgraduate degree in political science in 2006 at Om Maya Sundram Private College, Brindavan, which is affiliated with Guru Ghasidas University, Bilaspur.

== Career ==
Rathia won from the Dharamjaigarh Assembly constituency, representing the Indian National Congress in the 2023 Chhattisgarh Legislative Assembly election. He polled 90,493 votes and defeated his nearest rival, Harishchandra Rathia of the Bharatiya Janata Party, by a margin of 9,637 votes. He became an MLA for the first time, winning the 2013 Chhattisgarh Legislative Assembly election, representing the Indian National Congress. He polled 79,276 votes and defeated his nearest Om Prakash Rathia of the BJP by a margin of 19,988 votes. Later, he retained the seat, winning the 2018 Chhattisgarh Legislative Assembly election, defeating Leenav Birju Rathia of the BJP by a margin of 40,335 votes. Finally, in 2023, he won for the third consecutive term.
