= Bilaigarh =

- Tehsil
- Location in Chhattisgarh, India Bilaigarh (India)
- Coordinates: 21°39′0″N 82°43′0″E
- Country: India
- State: Chhattisgarh
- District: Sarangarh-Bilaigarh
- Elevation: 226 m (741 ft)

Languages
  - Official: Hindi, Chhattisgarhi
- Time zone: UTC+5:30 (IST)
- PIN: 493338
- Telephone code: 07729
- Vehicle registration: CG
- Coastline: 0 kilometres (0 mi)

Bilaigarh is a major town in the Sarangarh-Bilaigarh district of Chhattisgarh, India.

== Geography ==
It is located at an elevation of 226 m above MSL.

== Location ==
The National Highway 200 passes through Bilaigarh. The nearest airport is Raipur Airport and the nearest railway station is at Champa.
