= Rajni Devi =

Indian politician

Mrs Rajnigandha Devi was the daughter of Raja Naresh Chandra Singh, and former member of parliament. Born at Girivilas Palace, Sarangarh on 31 January 1937, she studied in St Joseph's Convent Nagpur and at Lady Amrit Bai College of Nagpur University. In 1967, she was elected to the 4th Lok Sabha from Raigarh constituency on a Congress Party ticket. She was a member till the dissolution of the house for a mid-term poll in 1971. She married Late Colonel (Retd.) Virendra Singh and lived in Jabalpur, M.P. She has a daughter, Nandita Singh and a son, Chandravir Singh who has a daughter Akshata Veer Singh.

She expired on 31 August 2019.
