= Chanesh Ram Rathiya =

Chhattisgarh minister and senior Congress leader (1942–2020)

MLA of Dharamjaigarh
- Incumbent
- Assumed office 19 March 1997

Animal husbandry minister
- In office 2000–2003

Personal details
- Born: 1942
- Died: 14 September 2020 Raigarh
- Party: Indian National Congress
- Profession: Politician

Chanesh Ram Rathiya was a Chhattisgarh minister and senior Congress leader. He was elected as an MLA in 1977 from Dharamjaigarh constituency and in the undivided Madhya Pradesh. He subsequently won five more Assembly elections in a row from the same seat. He served as animal husbandry minister in the Digvijay Singh led-Congress government in erstwhile Madhya Pradesh, and was the food and civil supplies minister in the Ajit Jogi government (2000-2003) after the formation of Chhattisgarh in 2000.

== Early and personal life ==
Chanesh Ram Rathiya was born in 1942. He is survived by his wife, two sons and three daughters. His elder son Laljeet Singh Rathiya is currently a Congress legislator from Dharamjaigarh seat in Chhattisgarh.

== Death ==
Chanesh Ram Rathiya died because of COVID-19 at 14 September 2020 around 1 AM. He was admitted to the hospital in Raigarh, a health official said. He had age-related ailments, was admitted in a private hospital here on Saturday after testing positive for coronavirus. He was 78.
