= Raigarh–Gondia Jan Shatabdi Express =

Train in India

Raigarh Junction – Gondia Junction Jan Shatabdi Express

Overview
- Service type: Superfast Express, Jan Shatabdi Express
- Locale: Chhattisgarh & Maharashtra
- Current operator: South East Central Railway

Route
- Termini: Raigarh (RIG); Gondia Junction (G)
- Stops: 13
- Distance travelled: 414 km (257 mi)
- Average journey time: 7 hrs 5 mins
- Service frequency: Six days a week. (Note: Except Sundays for 12069 and Saturdays for 12070)
- Train number: 12069 / 12070

On-board services
- Classes: AC Chair Car, Second Class Seating
- Seating arrangements: Yes
- Sleeping arrangements: No
- Auto-rack arrangements: Overhead racks
- Catering facilities: No pantry car attached E-catering available
- Observation facilities: Large windows
- Baggage facilities: Available
- Other facilities: Below the seats

Technical
- Rolling stock: LHB coach
- Track gauge: 1,676 mm (5 ft 6 in)
- Operating speed: 110 km/h (68 mph) maximum, 59 km/h (37 mph) average including halts.
Route map
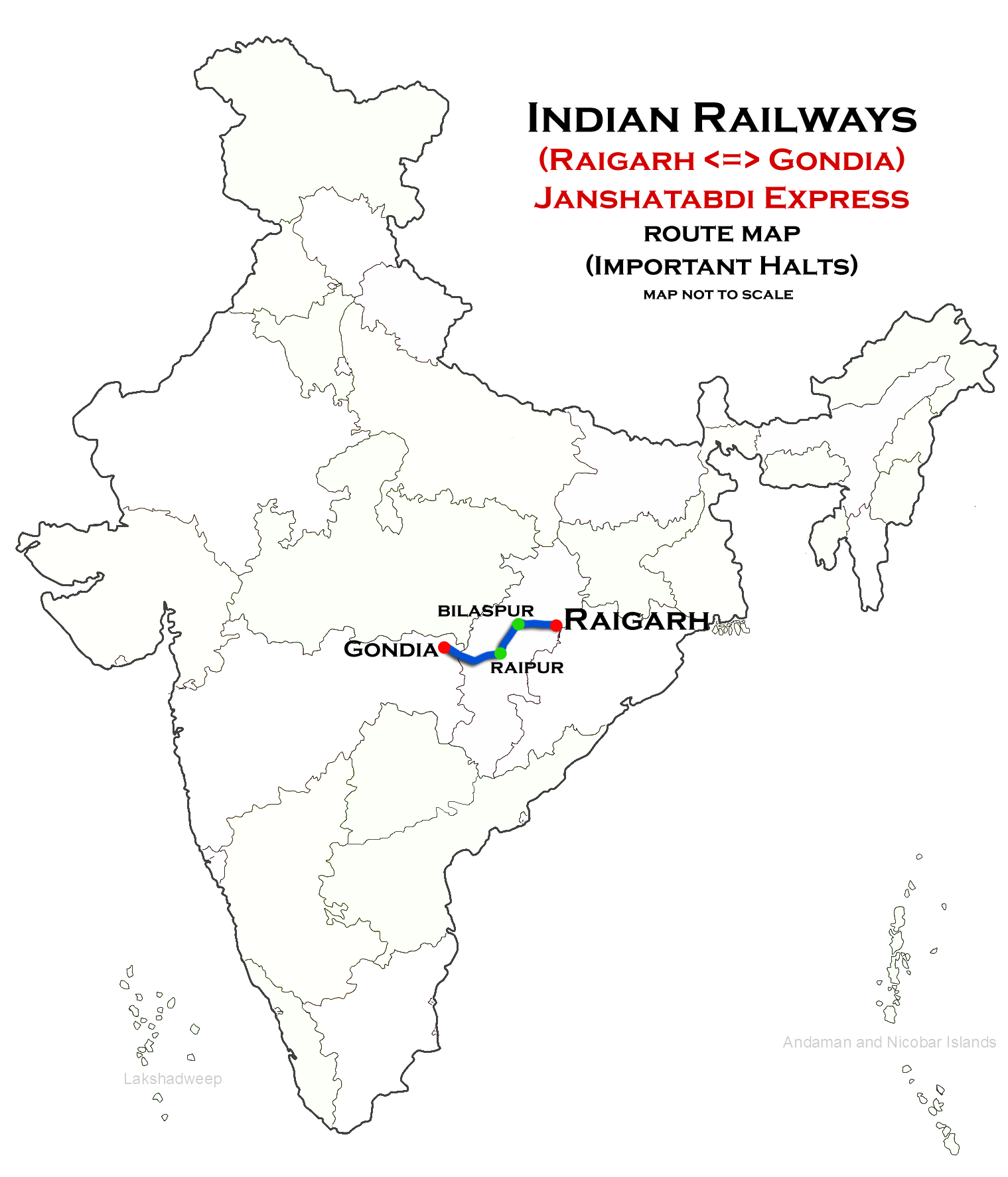
↓ 12069 • 12070 ↑

The 12069 / 12070 Raigarh-Gondia Jan Shatabdi Express is a superfast express train belonging to Indian Railways – South East Central Railway zone that runs between Raigarh and Gondia Junction in India.

It operates as train number 12069 from Raigarh to Gondia Junction and as train number 12070 in the reverse direction, serving the states of Maharashtra and Chhattisgarh.

== Coaches ==
The 12069 / 70 Raigarh–Gondia Jan Shatabdi Express has 3 AC Chair Car and 14 Second Class seating coaches. It does not carry a pantry car.

As is customary with most train services in India, coach composition may be amended at the discretion of Indian Railways depending on demand.

== Service ==
The 12069 / 70 Raigarh–Gondia Jan Shatabdi Express covers the distance of 414 kilometres in 07 hours 00 mins (59.14 km/h) in both directions.

As the average speed of the train is above 55 km/h (34 mph), as per Indian Railways rules, its fare includes a Superfast surcharge.

== Routeing ==
The 12069/12070 Raigarh–Gondia Jan Shatabdi Express runs from Raigarh via Champa Junction, Akaltara, Bilaspur Junction, Bhatapara, Raipur Junction, Durg, Rajnandgaon, Dongargarh to Gondia Junction.

== Traction ==
As the entire route is fully electrified, a Bhilai Loco Shed-based WAP-7 electric locomotive powers the train for its entire journey.

== Timings ==
12069 Raigarh–Gondia Jan Shatabdi Express leaves Raigarh every day except Sunday at 06:10 hrs IST and reaches Gondia Junction at 13:25 hrs IST the same day.

12070 Gondia–Raigarh Jan Shatabdi Express leaves Gondia Junction every day except Sunday at 15:00 hrs IST and reaches Raigarh at 22:00 hrs IST the same day.
