= Sakti, Chhattisgarh =

Sakti
- City
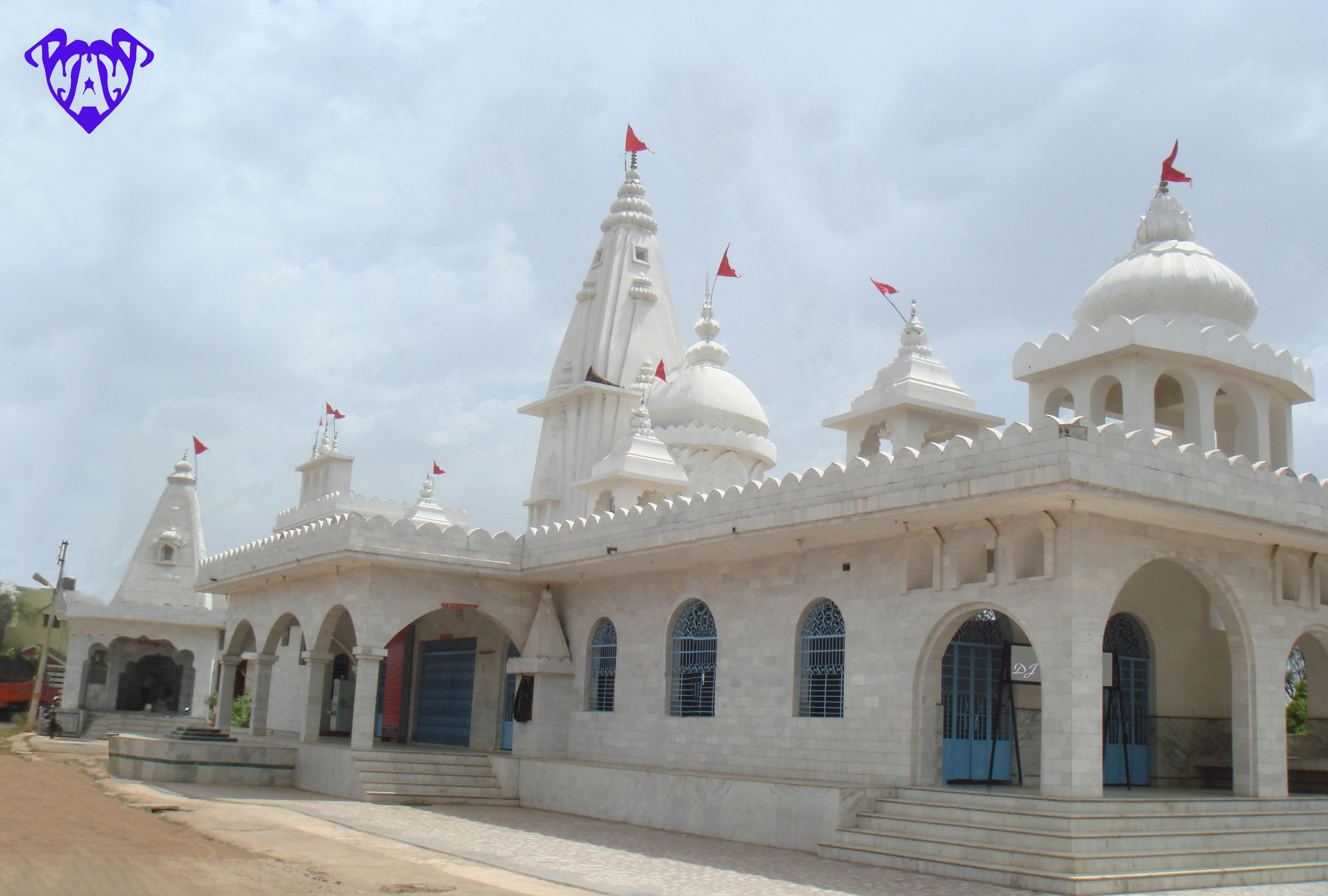
- Maa Beri Wali Mandir Sakti

- Location in Chhattisgarh, India Sakti (India)
- Coordinates: 22.03°N 82.97°E
- Country: India
- State: Chhattisgarh
- District: Sakti
- Named for: Maa Mahamaya temple in heart of Town

Government
  - Body: Government of Chhattisgarh
- Elevation: 237 m (778 ft)

Population (2011)
  - Total: 30,100
- Time zone: UTC+5:30 (IST)
- Postal code: 495689
- Vehicle registration: CG-36

Sakti is a city and a district in the state of Chhattisgarh. The assembly constituency number of Sakti district is 33. Earlier it was the only education district in Chhattisgarh. There are 245 panchayats and 458 villages in Sakti district. Sakti district was formed on 15 August 2021 and came into full existence as a district on 9 September 2022.

== Administration ==
The District falls under Bilaspur Administrative division of Chhattisgarh. Its District headquarters is situated in Jetha, Sakti on the National Highway 49. The First Collector and District Magistrate of Sakti was Nupur Rashi Panna (I.A.S). who was succeeded by the current Collector Amrit Vikas Topno(I.A.S). First Superintendent of Police is M.R. Ahire (I.P.S) and First District Education Officer is B.L. Khare, who was also the last District Education Officer of Education District Sakti. The First MLA of district was Charan Das Mahant (During 2018–2023), who is the current Opposition Leader of the Chhattisgarh Legislative assembly, and was re-elected in 2023.

== Geography ==
Sakti is located at 22.03°N 82.97°E. It has an average elevation of 237 metres (777 feet).

Sakti is a city situated on the banks of Borai river and foothills of Udaigiri Mountain range of Chhattisgarh. It gets its name from age old temple of Maa Mahamaya in the Heart of Sakti. Town comes in the drainage system of Mand river, The Mand river originates from the Mand mountain range. Surrounded by hills from Northern Direction, it has beautiful waterfalls and famous tourist places around like Damau which has Ancient hand written scripts on walls of its cave with a perennial waterfall, Rainkhol which is a forest cut area, The Chandrahasini Shakti Peath and The Adbhar Ashtabhuji Ma Shakti Peath which is an archaeological site. Main flora is Sal, Mahua and fauna is the Indian Bear, Hyena. Soil is found to be rich in Iron, with some traces of Pitchblende

Sakti district is surrounded by Korba district in the North-West, Janjgir-Champa District in the West, Raigarh district in the East, Sarangarh district in the South.

== History ==
During the British Raj era, Sakti was the capital of Sakti State, one of several princely states of the Eastern States Agency. On 15 August 2021, by then Chief Minister of Chhattisgarh Bhupesh Baghel, Sakti was announced as a new district of Chhattisgarh, along with Mohla- Manpur, Sarangarh-Bilaigarh & Manendragarh. Raising the total number of districts in Chhattisgarh to 33. Three more districts were announced later, making the city 36th district of the state carved out of its previous district Janjgir-Champa .

== Climate ==
Sakti has a tropical wet and dry climate. Temperatures remain moderate for most of the year, except from March to June, which can be extremely hot. The temperature in April–May sometimes rises above 44 °C. These summer months also have dry and hot winds. The city receives about 1,300 millimeters (51 in) of rain, mostly in the monsoon season from late June to early October. Winters last from November to January and are mild, although lowest temperature can fall up to 5 °C (41 °F). The entire area including Sakti is passing through a severe shortage of drinking water. Groundwater is hard and water resources are limited. If the problem of drinking water is not met timely, the entire terrain may be converted into the desert in the years to come.

== Demographics ==
The Sakti city is divided into 18 wards for which elections are held every 5 years.

According To Census 2011

According to Census 2011, the current area of Sakti District at the time of Census had a population of 6,46,954. From which The Sakti Municipality Area had population of 21,955 of which 11,111 are males while 10,844 are females as per report released by Census India 2011, making the area largest city of the District. It has approximately 94% agricultural land which is highest in state.

Sakti Current Population Estimates

Current estimated population of Sakti Municipality Area in 2024 is approximately 31,000. Scheduled Census of the district was postponed due to COVID Pandemic, making it uncertain about duration of next Census.

== Transport ==
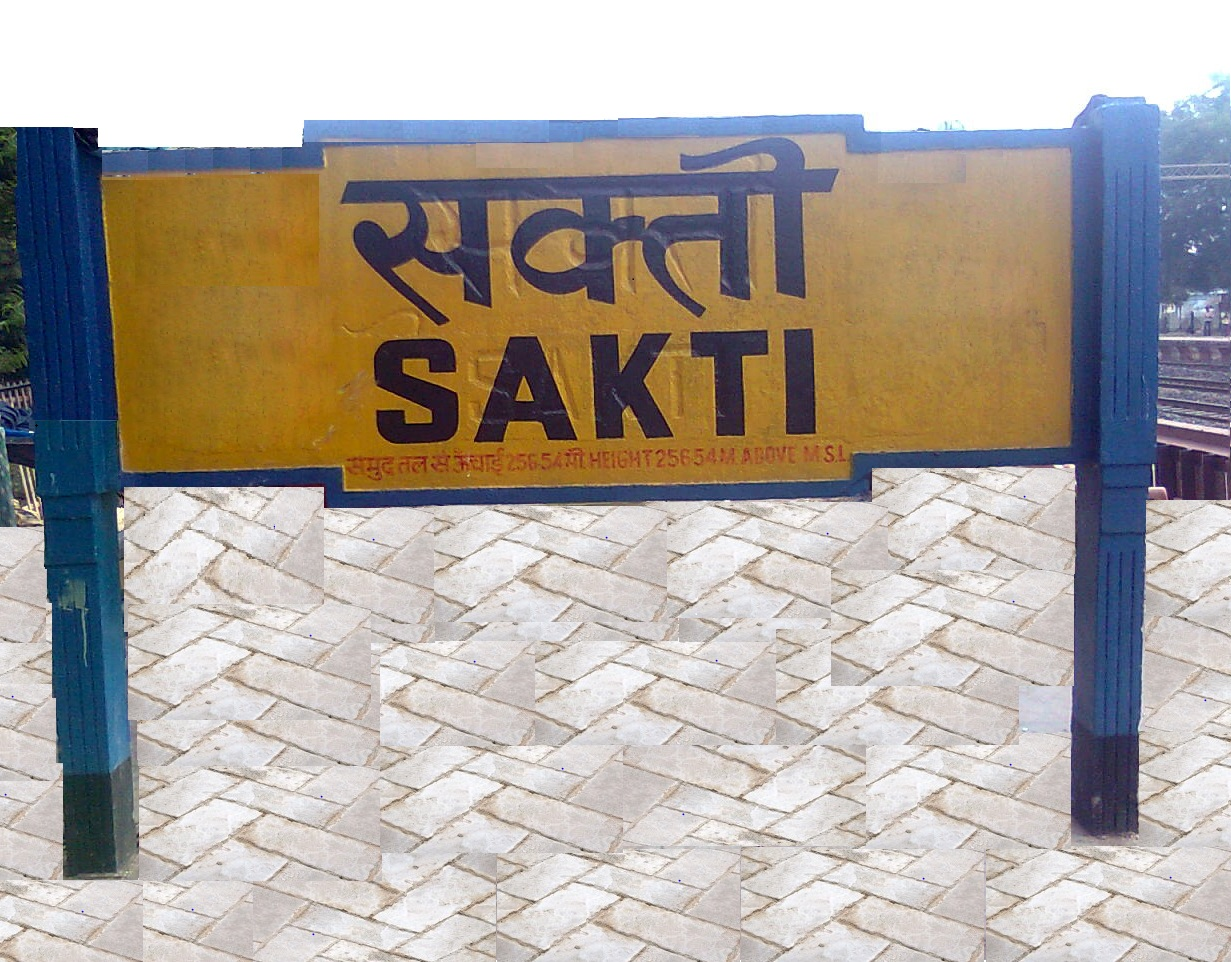
Sakti Railway Station

Sakti has a Railway Station on the Tatanagar–Bilaspur section of Howrah-Nagpur-Mumbai line. Major trains stop here including Mumbai-Howrah Mail since beginning. It is also connected through National Highway No.200. Sakti District Headquarters State Highway No. SH16 directly connects Subdivision Malkharoda and Subdivision Dabhra by Chhapora Road. The shortest road connecting Korba to Orissa Raigarh, Dabhra, Malkharoda and Sarangarh passes through Sakti City. Sakti City is a major road junction which connects different city and state.

== Industries ==
- India's largest Trailer and Tipper Manufacturing Plant Vandana Group - Manufacturer of Truck's Tipper, Trailer, Flatbed Trailer, Box Type (Manual) Trailer, Tractor Trolley and Agricultural Implements.
- Sakti known as India's dolomite hub. India's largest dolomite storage area has been achieved in Sakti district, which will start mining here in the coming time.
- The silk fabric here is famous all over Chhattisgarh.
- Swastik Metal industry also situated in Sakti.
- RKM Powergen pvt.ltd 1440MW Thermal Power Plant situated in district Sakti, village Uchchpinda-Bandhapali
- DB Power Ltd Badadhara, Sakti
- Pradakshina Consulting Private Limited
- Console Corptech
- Sakti Biz

== Education ==
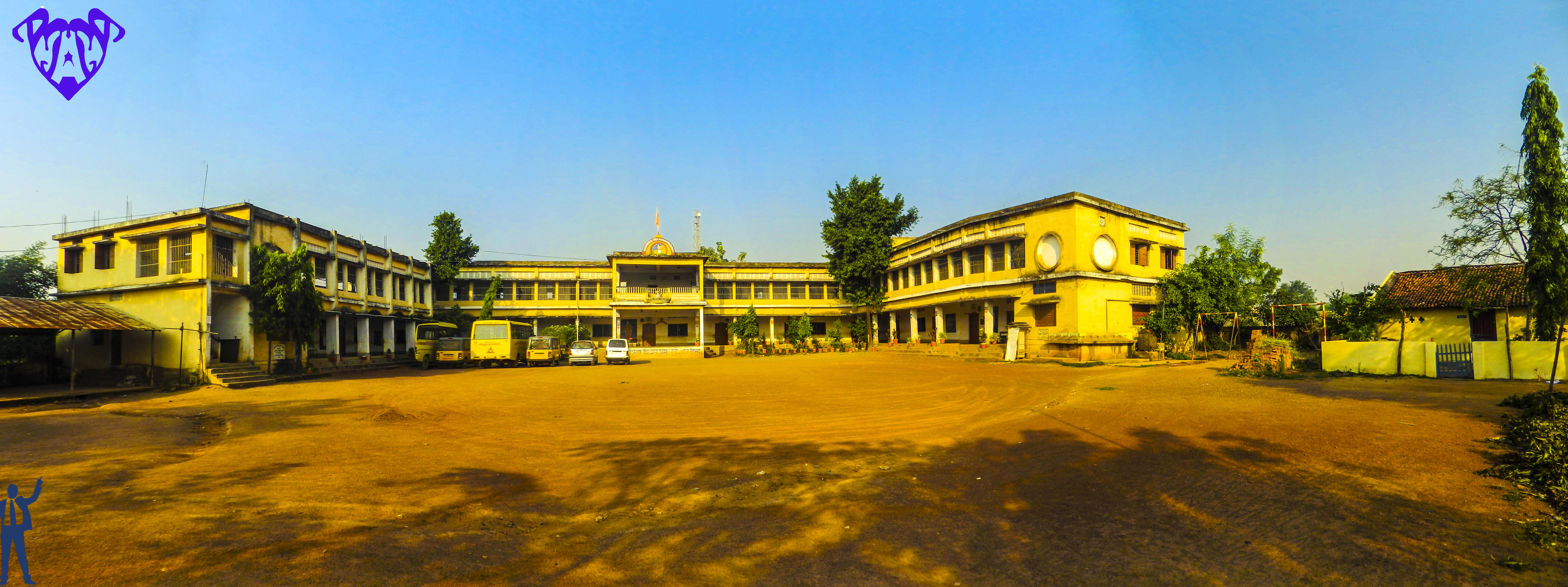
Saraswati Shishu Mandir, Sakti

There are many private and government schools and colleges in Sakti, some of them are:

Schools

- Jindal World School, Kanchanpur, Sakti (CBSE affiliated)
- Sanskar Public School, Harethi, Sakti (CBSE affiliated)
- Anunay Convent School, Sakti
- Gunjan Education Center, Sakti
- J.B.D.A.V. Hr. Sec. School, Sakti
- Little Flower English Medium School, Sakti
- Swami Atmanand Govt. English medium School, Sakti
- Nav Jeevan Mook Badhir School, Sakti (School for deaf and mute)
- Saraswati Shishu Mandir, Sakti (one of the oldest school of Sakti, established in 1957)
- Govt. G.H.M.S., Sakti
- M.L.Jain H.S. School, Sakti (First English Medium School of Sakti, established in the 1980s)
- Govt. P.S. Sarwani, Sakti

Colleges

- Jawaharlal Nehru College, Sakti
- Government Kranti Kumar Bhartiya College, Jetha, Sakti
- Government Atal Bihari Vajpayee College, Nagarda, Sakti
- Shyam Shiksha Mahavidyalaya Damaudhara, Sakti
- Jagrani Devi Shikha Mahavidyalaya Baradwar, Sakti
- Shri Balaji College of Pharmaceutical Sciences, Damaudhara Sakti
- Jagrani Devi degree College Baradwar, Sakti
- Pt Sunder Lal Sharma Vishwavidyalaya, Sakti
- Prajapati Brahma Kumari Ishwari Vishwavidyalaya, Sakti
- C.V. Raman College, Sakti

Industrial Training Institutes (ITI's)

- Government ITI Sakti
- Jagrani Devi ITI Sakti
