= Sakti district =

- District of Chhattisgarh
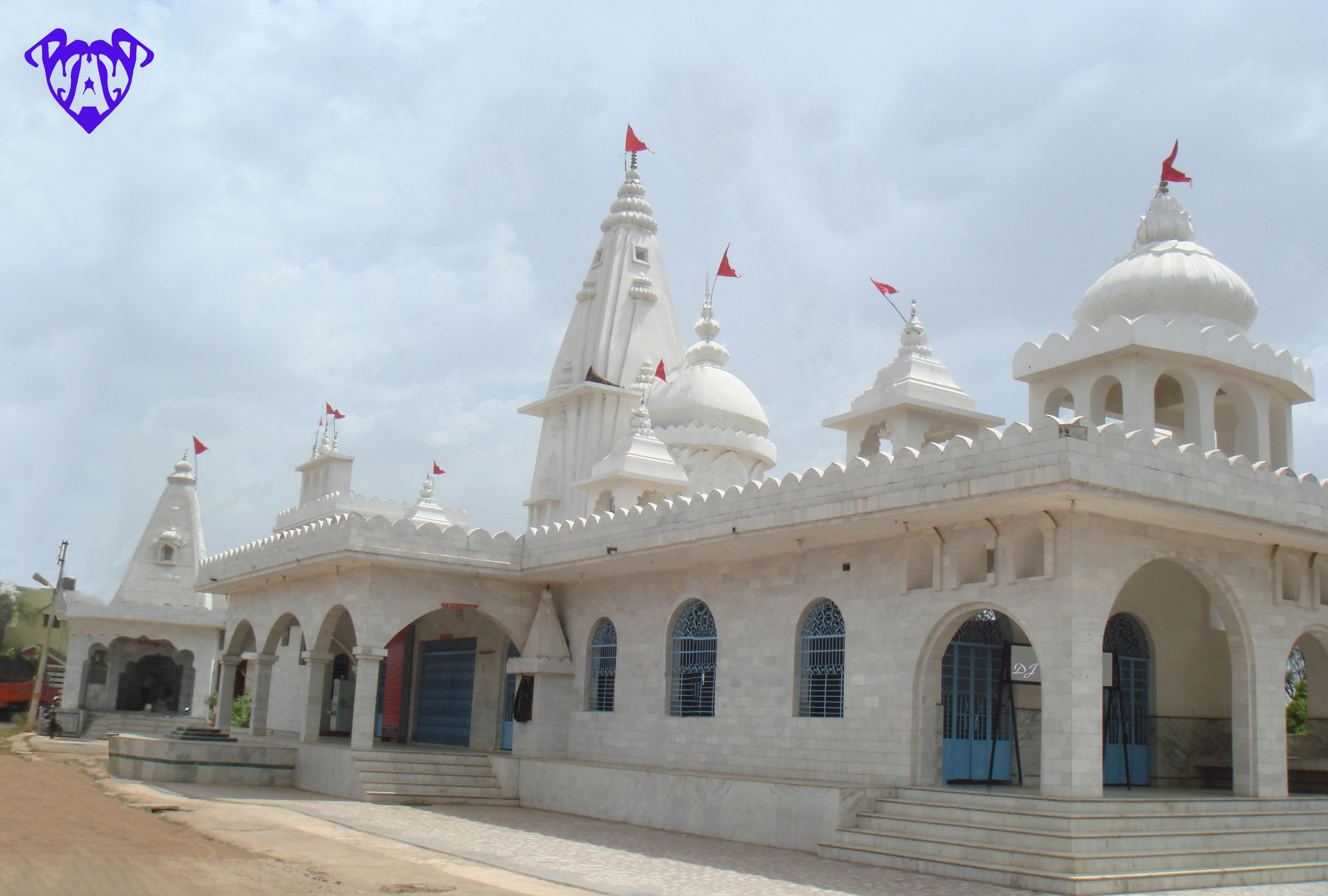
- Maa Beri Wali Mandir in Sakti

- Location in Chhattisgarh
- Coordinates (Sakti): 23.02°N 82.96°E
- Country: India
- State: Chhattisgarh
- Division: Bilaspur
- Headquarters: Sakti
- Tehsils: 9

Government
  - Vidhan Sabha constituencies: 3

Population (2011)
  - Total: 653,036

Demographics
  - Sex ratio: 1004
- Time zone: UTC+05:30 (IST)
- Major highways: 3

Sakti district is the 33rd district formed in the state of Chhattisgarh, India announced by then Chief Minister Bhupesh Baghel on 15 August 2021, being carved out from Janjgir-Champa district. The district was formerly the princely state of Sakti, which had joined Bilaspur district after Independence.

The district is located in the Mahanadi river valley, with several hill ranges in the south of the district. The Mahanadi forms the southern boundary of the district.

== Demographics ==
Religions in Sakti district (2011)
Religion	Percent
Hinduism	98.85%
Islam	0.63%
Other or not stated	0.52%
Distribution of religions

At the time of the 2011 census, Sakti district had a population of 653,036, of which 61,508 (9.42%) live in urban areas. Sakti district has a sex ratio of 1004 females to 1000 males. Scheduled Castes and Scheduled Tribes make up 148,386 (22.72%) and 104,296 (15.97%) of the population respectively.

Languages of Sakti district (2011)
1. Chhattisgarhi (96.0%)
2. Hindi (2.72%)
3. Others (1.30%)

At the time of the 2011 Census of India, 95.98% of the population in the district spoke Chhattisgarhi and 2.72% Hindi as their first language.

== Early history ==
Before being a district, Sakti was previously a princely state, being ruled by royal family of Sakti. The rulers of this princely state bore the title of 'Rana'.

- .... – .... Rudra Singh
- .... – .... Udai Singh
- .... – .... Kiwat Singh
- .... – .... Kagan Singh
- .... – 1837 Kalandar Singh
- 1837–19 Jun 1850 Vacant
- 19 Jun 1850 – 1875 Ranjit Singh (b. 1836 – d. ....)
- 1875 – Feb 1892 Vacant
- Feb 1892 – Jul 1914 Rup Narayan Singh
- 4 July 1914 – 15 August 1947 Liladhar Singh (b. 1892 – d. 19..)

His Son Raja Surendra Bahadur Singh, represented India in its hockey team and was twice a minister for the government of the State of Madhya Pradesh.

After independence of India the government of India took over ruling power and handed it to newly formed state government of Madhya Pradesh, on November 1, 2000 along many other districts Sakti got carved out of Madhya Pradesh to form a new state called Chhattisgarh.

== Formation as district ==
On August 15, 2021 then Chief Minister of Chhattisgarh announced 4 new districts with Sakti being one of them, raising the number of districts in state to 33 and giving the district identity of 33rd announced district. However Sakti will get its status as District a year later on September 9, 2021 after 3 more districts were announced and formed marking Sakti as 36th district of Chhattisgarh.
