= Mand River =

Coordinates: 21°42′04″N 83°15′03″E

The Mand River is a tributary of the Mahanadi in India. It joins the Mahanadi in Chandarpur, in Chhattisgarh, 28 km from the Odisha border and before the river reaches the Hirakud Dam.

The river, whose total length is 241 km, rises to an elevation of about 686 m in Surguja district in Chhattisgarh. It receives the drainage of the southern part of the Mainpat Plateau, an area of about 5200 km^{2}.
