= Sarangarh State =

Princely state in British India

Coordinates: 21.6°N 83.08°E

Sarangarh State ସାରଙ୍ଗଡ଼ ରାଜ୍ୟ / सारंगढ़ रियासत
- Princely State of British India
- 1691–1948
- Coat of arms

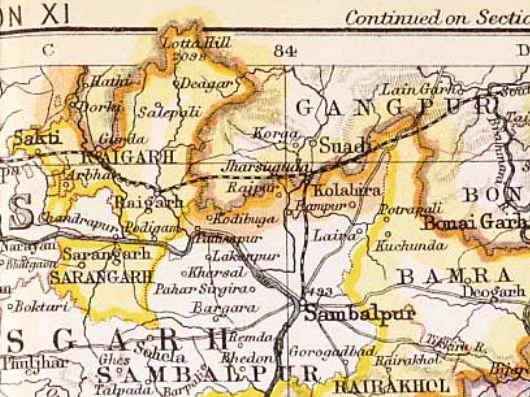
- Sarangarh State in the Imperial Gazetteer of India
- Area
  - 1901: 1,399 km^{2} (540 sq mi)
- Population
  - 1901: 79,900
- History
  - Established: 1691
  - Independence of India: 1948
Succeeded by
India

Sarangarh was a princely state in India during the British Raj ruled by a Raj Gond dynasty Ancient Kshatriya Clan of Central India. The emblem of the state was a turtle.

Historically, Sarangarh was one of the eighteen Garhjats (feudatory states) that maintained close political and administrative ties with the Sambalpur Kingdom. In 1862, following the reorganization of British administrative boundaries, the state was formally placed under the Chhattisgarh Division of the newly created Central Provinces. When the primary Odia-speaking districts, including Sambalpur, were transferred out of the Central Provinces in 1905 to consolidate linguistic regions, Sarangarh along with neighboring princely states remained attached to the Chhattisgarh Feudatory States Agency due to its geographic proximity and administrative integration with the Chhattisgarh plains. Consequently, the region developed a distinct cultural and linguistic identity, heavily influenced by both Chhattisgarhi and the local Lariya dialect.

Its capital was in Sarangarh town, now in Chhattisgarh state. The state had no significant towns except for its capital. A small state, its area was 1,399 km^{2} with a population of 79,900, according to the 1901 census.

== History ==
According to legend, Sarangarh state was founded in the first century AD by members of the Rajgond (Aboriginal Kshatriya) clan that had migrated from Bhandara. It was originally a dependency of the Ratanpur Kingdom and later became one of the eighteen Garhjat states under Sambalpur State The Sambalpur kings favoured Sarangarh owing to its readiness to help their kingdom during military campaigns.

In 1818, Sarangarh became a British protectorate. Between 1878 and 1889, Sarangarh state was placed under the direct administration of British India owing to economic mismanagement and the infancy of the ruler Bhawani Pratap Singh. Sarangarh was a small feudatory state, part of the Chhattisgarh division.

On 1 January 1948, Sarangarh State acceded to the Indian Union.

=== Rulers ===
Sarangarh State was one of several princely states governed by the Raj Gond Clan. The rulers bore the title 'Raja'

== Ruling Chief of Sarangarh ==
=== Raja Saheb Udho Sai Singh (The Founder of Sarangarh State) ===
- 1736 – 1777, Raja Saheb Kalyan Sai
- 1777 – 1808, Raja Saheb Vishvanath Sai
- 1808 – 1815, Raja Saheb Subhadra Sai
- 1827 – 1828, Raja Saheb Bhikhan Sai
- 1828 – 1828, Raja Saheb Tikan Sai
- 1828 – 1829, Raja Saheb Gajraj Singh
- 1829 – 1872, Raja Saheb Singram Singh
- 1872 – 1889, Raja Saheb Bhawani Pratap Singh
- 1889 _ 1890, Raja Saheb Raghubir Singh
- 1890 _ 1946, Raja Saheb Jawahir Singh
- 1946 – 1947, Raja Saheb Naresh Chandra Singh
- (1947 - 1988) Raja Saheb Naresh Chandra Singh (Former Chief Minister of Undivided Madhya Pradesh)
- (1988 - 2016) Raja Saheb Sishir Raj Bindu Singh

== See also ==
- Eastern States Agency
- Political integration of India
