= Sarangarh-Bilaigarh district =

- District of Chhattisgarh
- Location in Chhattisgarh
- Coordinates (Sakti): 23.02°N 82.96°E
- Country: India
- State: Chhattisgarh
- Division: Bilaspur
- Headquarters: Sarangarh
- Tehsils: 3

Government
  - Vidhan Sabha constituencies: 1

Population (2011)
  - Total: 607,434

Demographics
  - Sex ratio: 1005
- Time zone: UTC+05:30 (IST)
- Major highways: 3

Sarangarh-Bilaigarh district is one of the four new district in the state of Chhattisgarh, India announced by Bhupesh Baghel on 15 August 2021. It is carved out from Raigarh and Baloda Bazar districts.

== Demographics ==
At the time of the 2011 census, Sarangarh-Bhilaigarh district had a population of 607,434, of which 43,396 (7.14%) live in urban areas. Sarangarh-Bhilaigarh district has a sex ratio of 1005 females to 1000 males. Scheduled Castes and Scheduled Tribes make up 173,819 (28.62%) and 80,958 (13.33%) of the population respectively. Hinduism is the predominant religion, practiced by 99.32% of the population.

Languages of Sarangarh-Bhilaigarh district (2011)
1. Chhattisgarhi (90.0%)
2. Odia (7.69%)
3. Hindi (1.79%)
4. Others (0.53%)

At the time of the 2011 Census of India, 89.99% of the population in the district spoke Chhattisgarhi, 7.69% Odia and 1.79% Hindi as their first language.
