= Sakti State =

Coordinates: 22.03°N 82.97°E

Sakti State सक्ती रियासत
- Princely State of British India
- TBD–1948
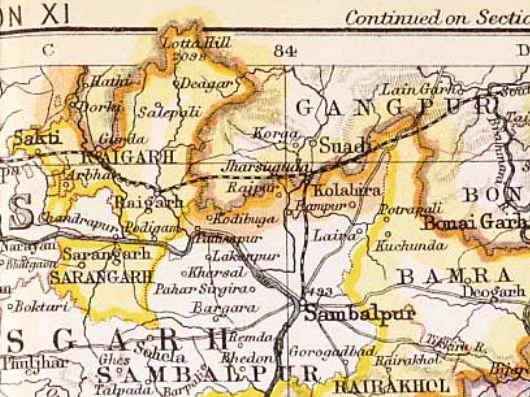
- Sakti State in the Imperial Gazetteer of India
- Area
  - 1892: 357 km^{2} (138 sq mi)
- Population
  - 1892: 22,819
- History
  - Established: TBD
  - Accession to the Union of India: 1948
| Succeeded by |
| India |

Sakti State was one of the princely states of India during the British Raj. It belonged to the Chhattisgarh States Agency, which later became the Eastern States Agency.

The capital was Sakti town, which had 1,791 inhabitants, according to the 1901 Census of India. Today, it is located in the state of Chhattisgarh. It had an area of 357 km^{2} and, in 1892, a population of 22,819 inhabitants. Its rulers were RAJGOND and had a privy purse of 29,000 rupees. The princely state acceded to the Indian Union on 1 January 1948, thus ceasing to exist.

== History ==
Sakti State's rulers were Naagvanshi Raj Gonds. The year when the state was founded is not known. Legend says that it was founded by two twin brothers, who were soldiers of the Raja of Sambalpur. The capital was in Sakti, Janjgir-Champa district, Chhattisgarh. Sakti's last ruler was Rana Bahadur Leeladhar Singh, born on 3 February 1892, who succeeded as new RANA on 4 July 1914. The princely family still exists and is headed by Raja Surender Bahadur Singh, who represented India in its hockey team and was twice a minister for the government of the State of Madhya Pradesh. On the 19 October 2021, Kunwar Dharmendra Singh, adopted son of Surender was announced as the successor as the titular head of the former ruling family. In early January 2022, a F.I.R. was filed against Kunwar Dharmendra Singh for rape, house trespass and assault. In 2025 Kunwar Dharmendra Singh ascended as head of the family. Later around in May 2025, The former head of family Raja Surendra Bahadur died of old age. Later the same month Kunwar Dharmendra Singh was convicted of the crime by FTSC for case of assault filed back in 2022, and sentenced to 7 years & 5 years of jail, both of which would run simultaneously.

=== The rulers of this princely state bore the title of 'Rana' ===
- HH RANA BAHADUR GUJAR SINGH
- HH RANA BAHADUR RUDRA SINGH
- HH RANA BAHADUR UDAY SINGH
- HH RANA BAHADUR KIWAT SINGH
- HH RANA BAHADUR KAGAN SINGH
- HH RANA BAHADUR KALANDAR SINGH
- HH RANA BAHADUR LAL RANJIT SINGH (1857 - 1892)
- HH RANA BAHADUR LAL RUP NARAYAN SINGH (1892 - 1914)
- HH RANA BAHADUR LAL LEELADHAR SINGH (1914 - 1948)

== After Independence the Head of Royal Family ==
- HH RANA LAL JIVENDRA BAHADUR SINGH
- HH RANA LAL SURENDRA BAHADUR SINGH
- HH RANA BAHADUR DHARMENDRA SINGH (PRESENT)

== See also ==
- Eastern States Agency
- Political integration of India
