= Dharamjaigarh =

Dharamjaygarh Udaipur state, Chhattisgarh
- town
- Location in Chhattisgarh, India Dharamjaygarh (India)
- Coordinates: 22.47°N 83.22°E
- Country: India
- State: Chhattisgarh
- District: Raigarh
- Elevation: 300 m (980 ft)

Population (2011)
  - Total: 14,354

Languages
  - Official: Chhattisgari, Hindi, Bengali
- Time zone: UTC+5:30 (IST)
- PIN: 496116
- Area code: 07766
- Vehicle registration: CG

Dharamjaigarh is a sub-division,town and a nagar panchayat in Raigarh District in the state of Chhattisgarh, India. Major languages spoken are Hindi and Chhattisgarhi, with a little Odia, Bengali and English. Situated in the northern part of the district, it lies close to the forested hills of the Eastern Chhattisgarh region and borders parts of Jashpur and Korba. The area is known for its large tribal population, dense sal forests, and small-scale agriculture, particularly paddy cultivation. Dharamjaigarh also holds historical significance as part of the former princely state of Raigarh, and today serves as an administrative and commercial hub for surrounding villages. Laljeet Singh Rathia is a current MLA of the Dharamjaigarh constituency.

== Geography ==
Dharamjaigarh is located at 22.47°N 83.22°E. It has an average elevation of 300 m (980 ft).

Dharamjaigarh is a taluk headquarters and prominent town in the Raigarh District of Chhattisgarh. It is located on Raigarh-Ambikapur highway, about 77 km north-west of Raigarh. Raipur is the nearest airport, and Raigarh is the nearest railhead for Dharamjaigarh. Bus services are available from the place to Raigarh, Raipur, Bilaspur, Ranchi, Garhwa, Banaras, and Ambikapur.

== Demographics ==
As of 2001 India census, Dharamjaigarh had a population of 13,603. Males constitute 50% of the population and females 50%.In Dharamjaigarh, 14% of the population is under 6 years of age.Literacy rate of Dharamjaigarh town is 79.70 % ,higher than the state average of 70.28 %. In Dharamjaigarh, Male literacy is around 88.38 % while female literacy rate is at 70.71 %.

== History ==
Udaipur State was founded in 1818 as an offshoot of Surguja State (Surguja). From 1860 the rulers were Rajputs of the Raksel dynasty. The younger son of Maharaja Amar Singh Deo of Surguja State was granted the rule of Udaipur State. The first Rajput Raksel ruler was Raja Bahadur Bindeshwari Prasad Singh Deo CSI. The present ruling family is said to be descended from a Raksel Raja of Palamau. The state became a British protectorate in 1818. Formerly known as Rābkob, Dharamjaigarh was the capital of the princely state of Udaipur before independence. The name of the place was changed from Rābkob to Dharamjaigarh after Raja Bahadur Dharamjeet Singh Deo ruling chief, Udaipur State at that time. It was ruled by kings with the title Raja Bahadur. The kingly palace, along with the attached fruit orchards, is a major attraction of the town.

== Major Attractions ==
Dharamjaigarh is a beautiful town with laid-back environs, surrounded by forests on all sides. A walk in any direction out of the city leads to dense, deciduous forests, dotted with small tribal villages. In the monsoon, there is a blanket of greenery all over. The town itself is divided into two parts - one located atop a small plateau, and the other known as Nichepara, below it. The two parts are divided by a steep slope, locally known as Ghatia. Some important places of tourist attraction are:

1. Ambetikara: Also known as Amli or Imlitikara, it has a famous temple of Goddess Kali beside a shallow river.
2. Sisringa: It is a prominent valley, overlooking the town, with winding roads and a small temple at its highest point.
3. Amadarha: It is a beautiful picnic spot on the banks of the Mand river with numerous low waterfalls and forests on hill-slopes.
4. Gayatri Mandir: It is one of the famous temples in the town.
5. Dashera Festival: A three-day carnival on the club grounds, it is one of the most eagerly awaited events in the town.
6. Hanuman Mandir Nichepara: Another famous temple in the lower section of the town.
7. Udyan Vibhag Nursery: It is like a town garden: here many types of plants are available to buy.
8. The Christian Mission: It is a settlement of Christian missionaries working among the local tribals, and it also runs a church and a hospital.
9. Poria fall: very beautiful waterfall.
10. Crondha dam: a big dam in Krondha Dharamjaigarh.
11. Likhamada (Oongana): rock painting and tribal cave in Oongana.
12. Radha Krishna mandir in Dharamjaygarh colony

== Education ==
As of the 2011 Census of India, Dharamjaigarh had 27 primary schools, 12 middle schools, 1 secondary school and 8 senior-secondary schools along with 3 arts/commerce/science colleges.

== Economy ==
Dharamjaigarh's economy is agriculture based, which provides employment to most of the people, there is no industry or special economic zone, the nearest railway station is 77 km away,
