= Sarangarh =

- city
- Sarangarh
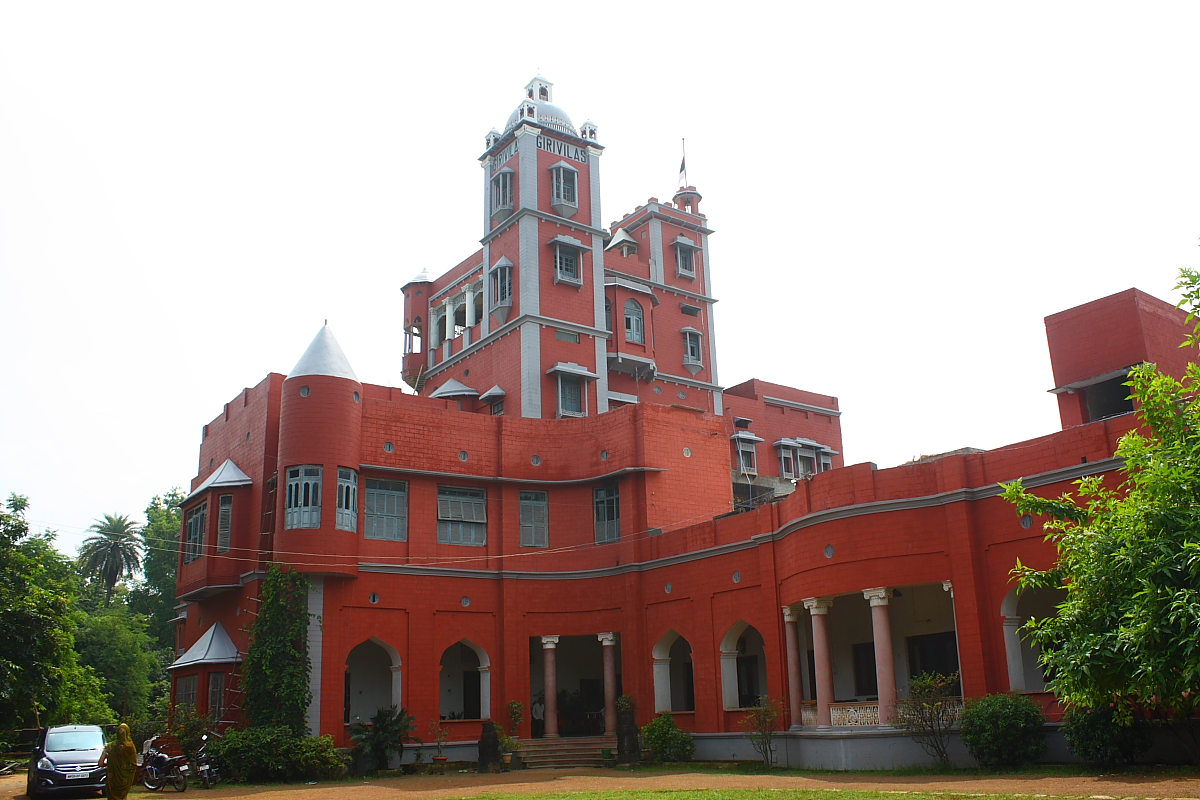
- Girivilas Palace
- Nickname: SRGH
- Location in Chhattisgarh, India Location in India
- Coordinates: 21°35′10.875″N 83°4′40.491″E
- Country: India
- State: Chhattisgarh
- District: Sarangarh-Bilaigarh
- Named for: Fort with Bambosa Tree

Government
  - Body: Nagar Palika Parishad
- Elevation: 217 m (712 ft)

Population (2014)
  - Total: 75,000

Languages
  - Official: Hindi, Chhattisgarhi
- Time zone: UTC+5:30 (IST)
- <Pin Code>: 496445
- Vehicle registration: CG-13

Sarangarh is a new district in the Indian state of Chhattisgarh.

== History ==
During the British Raj era, Sarangarh State was one of several princely states governed by the Raj Gond dynasty of Rajputs. It was originally a dependency of the Ratanpur Kingdom and later became one of the eighteen Garhjat states under Sambalpur State.

According to legend Sarangarh state was founded in the first century AD by Gond ancestors that had migrated from Bhandara. It was originally a dependency of the Ratanpur Kingdom and later became one of the eighteen Garhjat states under Sambalpur State The Sambalpur kings favoured Sarangarh owing to its readiness to help their kingdom during military campaigns.

In 1818 Sarangarh became a British protectorate. Between 1878 and 1889 Sarangarh state was placed under the direct administration of British India owing to economic mismanagement and the infancy of the ruler Bhawani Pratap Singh. Sarangarh was a small feudatory state, part of the Chhattisgarh division.

On 1 January 1948 Sarangarh State acceded to the Indian Union.

=== Rulers ===
Sarangarh State was one of several princely states governed by the Raj Gond Dynasty of Gonds. The rulers bore the title 'Raja'. Former rulers have included:

- .... – .... Udaibhan Singh
- .... – .... Birbhan Singh
- .... – 1736 Udho Sai Singh
- 1736 – 1777 Kalyan Sai
- 1777 – 1808 Vishvanath Sai
- 1808 – 1815 Subhadra devi
- 1827 – 5 January 1828 Bhikhan Sai (d. 1828)
- 5 January 1828 – 1828 Tikan Sai
- 1828 – May 1829 Gajraj Singh (d. 1829)
- May 1829 – 1872 Singram Singh
- 1872 – Sep 1889 Bhawani Pratap Singh (b. c.1865 – d. 1889)
- Sep 1889 – 5 August 1890 Lal Raghubir Singh (d. 1890)
- 5 August 1890 – 11 January 1946 Bahadur Jawahir Singh (b. 1886 – d. 1946)
- 11 Jan 1946 – 15 August 1947 Naresh Chandra Singh (b. 1908 – d. 1987)
- (1988- d. 2016) Raja Sishir Raj Bindu Singh
- (2016 - present) Raja Shree Raj Singh

== Demographics ==
Dist- As of 2001 India census, Sarangarh had a population of 2,14,458. Males constitute 51% of the population and females 49%. Sarangarh has an average literacy rate of 70%, higher than the national average of 59.5%: male literacy is 80%, and female literacy is 60%. In Sarangarh, 13% of the population is under 6 years of age.

Sarangarh is one of the historic and important towns of the state of Chhattisgarh. The town of Sarangarh falls within the jurisdiction of the Raigarh district of Chhattisgarh and comprises the area of the erstwhile Sarangarh Princely State. Sarangarh Town has a "Nagar Palika Parishad" comprising 15 wards. It is the headquarters of the sub-division by the same name. The town is 217 meters (711 feet) above sea level. The global location of Sarangarh falls within north latitude 21 degrees and 6 minutes to east longitude 83 degrees and eight minutes.

In accordance to the census of 2001, the population of Sarangarh is around 14,500. Sarangarh is one of the few Chhattisgarh cities and towns that have near parity in sex ratio. There are 49% females in the town and 51% males. Children under six years of age comprise almost 13% of the total population. Sarangarh has also done a considerable job in the literacy drive. The town authority and the educational department of the state have contributed in its moderate success. The town has achieved seventy percent of literacy, which is at least ten percent more than the national average. About eighty percent of males are literate while sixty percent is the female literacy rate. Some of the nearby villages are:

- Sarsiwa
- Madhuban
- Sapos
- Jashpur Nagar
- Baramkela
- Chandarpur
- Ramtek
- Kosir
- REDA
- Kharwani (Bade)
- Mauhadhodha (Sarangarh)

The Sarangarh subdivision comprises two development blocks namely Sarangarh and Baramkela. Sarangarh is located on the National Highway number 216 and is 52 km from the district HQ and rail head Raigarh, and 200 km from Raipur, the state capital and the nearest airport. The airstrip of Sarangarh is located 6 km towards Raigarh and was built during the IInd World War.

Gomarda wildlife sanctuary is located about 15 km from the town in the NH 216.

== Education ==
Sarangarh has eight secondary level schools and two graduate and post-graduate level colleges. For technical education, there is industrial training institute.

== Health ==
The town has a community health centre with three full-time doctors.

== See also ==
- Sarangarh Lok Sabha constituency
