= Samta Colony =

- Suburb
- Location in Chhattisgarh, India Samta Colony (India)
- Coordinates: 21°14′46″N 81°37′00″E
- Country: India
- State: Chhattisgarh
- District: Raipur

Government
  - Body: Raipur Municipal Corporation

Population
  - Total: 3,700

Languages
  - Official: Hindi, Chhattisgarhi
- Time zone: UTC+05:30 (IST)
- PIN: 492 001
- Vehicle registration: CG-04
- Nearest city: Raipur
- Lok Sabha constituency: Raipur
- Website: cgstate.gov.in

Samta Colony is an residential area situated in the heart of Raipur, Chhattisgarh, India. It is surrounded by Choubey Colony.

It covers about 10% of the area of the city, about 2 km^{2} (0.77 sq mi). It is situated about 2 km (1.2 mi) from the city's main marketplace.

== Neighbouring suburbs ==
- Choubey Colony, Amanaka, Bajrang Nagar, Gokul Nagar, Amapara.

== Transport and connectivity ==
=== By road ===
Samta Colony is well-connected to all the major parts of the city by roads and highways. The nearest bus stand is ISBT Bhatagaon and Pandri Bus Stand.

=== By rail ===
The nearest railway station is Raipur railway station which is around 2 km from Samta Colony.

=== By air ===
Swami Vivekananda Airport is the nearest airport that serves as a major airport for Raipur, Naya Raipur, Durg, Bhilai and Kumhari.

== Banks ==
The locality has branches of various ATMs such as State Bank of India, Federal Bank, Axis Bank, HDFC Bank, IndusInd Bank, ICICI Bank, Punjab National Bank, IDFC First Bank, IDBI Bank, Union Bank of India, Indian Overseas Bank, Bank of Maharashtra, United Bank of India, etc.

== Schools ==
- Mayaram Surjan Government Girls H.S. School
- Rainbow English Medium School
- Ashoka Public School
- Vision Public School
- Cryogenic Public School
- Brilliant Mind School

== Religious sites ==
- Khatu Shyam Mandir
- Shree Siddhi Shakti Peeth Shree Sheetla Mata Mandir
- Aamatalab Shiv Mandir
- Shankheshwar Parshwanath Shwetambar Jain Mandir And Dadabadi
- Chintaharan Hanuman Mandir
- Gayatri Mandir
- Sai Mandir
- Radhekrishna Mandir
- Shri Laxmi Narayan Mandir Temple
- Sri Bajrang Mandir
- Hathiram Shiv Mandir
- Shree Bhawani Shankar Mandir
