= Raipur–Bhilai–Durg Expressway =

Road in India

Raipur-Bhilai-Durg highway

Route information
- Length: 27 km (17 mi)
- History: Completed in 2006

Major junctions
- From: Raipur
- To: Bhilai

Location
- Country: India
- States: Chhattisgarh

Highway system
- Roads in India; Expressways; National; State; Asian

Raipur–Bhilai–Durg or Durg-Bhilai-Raipur Highway is a 27-kilometre-long (17 mi) high-speed urban highway that links Raipur- Bhilai and Durg) in the state of Chhattisgarh. The expressway also connects Chhattisgarh with Visakhapatnam, one of the most important ports of India. The expressway has two toll stations installed, one at Kharun - at the entry point of the expressway from Raipur and the other at Kutelabhata - at the exit point of the expressway towards Bhilai.

The construction work of the Raipur-Bhilai Expressway Project, worth Rs 95 crore was awarded by the National Highways Authority of India to DS Constructions Ltd (DSC). The expressway has been constructed on a Build-Operate-Transfer (BOT) basis with a concession period of 11 years 9 months, including the construction period of the project. The work included four laning of the existing two-lane carriageway on the Raipur-Bhilai section of NH-6 in Chhattisgarh. This has reduced the travel time between Raipur and Bhilai.

== See also ==
- Durg - Raipur - Arang Expressway: a proposed and upcoming 92 km long greenfield expressway.
- Expressways in Chhattisgarh
- Expressways in India
