= ISBT =

ISBT can stand for:

- International Society of Blood Transfusion
- Inter State Bus Terminals, stations for public buses in India
  - Inter-State Bus Terminus, Indore, Madhya Pradesh, India
  - Inter-State Bus Terminal, Raipur, Chhattisgarh, India
  - Babasaheb Bhimrao Ambedkar Bus Terminal, Odisha, India
  - Maharana Pratap Inter State Bus Terminus, formerly Kashmiri Gate Inter State Bus Terminal, Delhi, India
