= Raipur-Ranchi-Dhanbad Expressway =

Proposed road in India

Raipur–Ranchi-Dhanbad Expressway

Route information
- Maintained by National Highways Authority of India (NHAI)
- Length: 707 km (439 mi)
- Existed: Q4 2026 (expected)–present

Major junctions
- Central end: Dharsiwa, Raipur district, Chhattisgarh
- Eastern end: outskirt Dhanbad, Dhanbad district, Jharkhand

Location
- Country: India
- States: Chhattisgarh, Jharkhand
- Major cities: Raipur, Bilaspur, Chhattisgarh, Korba, Jashpur, Ranchi, Bokaro, Dhanbad

Highway system
- Roads in India; Expressways; National; State; Asian

Raipur–Ranchi-Dhanbad Expressway (NH), part of Raipur–Dhanbad Economic Corridor (EC-07), is an under-construction, Four-lane, 707 km (439 mi) long access-controlled greenfield expressway, which will pass through the states of Chhattisgarh, and Jharkhand from central to eastern India. It will pass through the coal reserves belt and Industrial towns of Raipur, Bilaspur, Korba, Jashpur, Ranchi, Bokaro, and Dhanbad between Chhattisgarh and Jharkhand in order to promote Industrialization in this region. This project will be mix of greenfield and brownfield. The existing part between Raipur-Bilaspur Expressway will be brownfield which will convert into Six lane expressway while the rest of the part between Bilaspur to Dhanbad will be fully greenfield.

It will reduce the current travel time and distance, from 16 hours to only 9 hours, and from 750 km (470 mi) to 707 km (439 mi). It is a part of the Bharatmala Pariyojana, and it will connect the Eastern Economic Corridor (India) which runs from paradip port to Bihar-Nepal border in Bihar.

== Sections ==
- Raipur-Bilaspur (Brownfield) (6 lanes)
- Bilaspur-Urga (Greenfield) (4 lanes)
- Urga - Pathalgaon (Greenfield) (4 lanes)
- Pathalgaon- Gumla (Greenfield) (4 lanes)
- Gumla- Ranchi (Greenfield) (4 lanes)
- Ranchi-Bokaro (Greenfield) (4 lanes)
- Bokaro-Dhanbad (Greenfield) (4 lanes)

== Current status ==
The Raipur–Dhanbad Economic Corridor is being developed under the Bharatmala Pariyojana Phase I. The project connects industrial and mining regions of Chhattisgarh and Jharkhand, providing improved road connectivity between Raipur, Bilaspur, Korba, Ranchi, Bokaro and Dhanbad.

According to information provided by the Ministry of Road Transport and Highways in the Lok Sabha on 29 January 2026, the corridor was divided into nine construction sections with varying levels of completion.

=== Section-wise progress ===
No.	Section	Length (km)	Project status (January 2026)
1	Bilaspur–Urga	70.20	69.01 km completed; remaining work was targeted for June 2026.
2	Urga–Pathalgaon	80.585	53.57 km completed; remaining work was targeted for August 2026.
3	Pathalgaon–Kunkuri–Chhattisgarh/Jharkhand border	104.25	87% physical possession of land acquired; Stage-I forest clearance received on 18 July 2025.
4	Chhattisgarh/Jharkhand border–Gumla	32	68% physical possession of land acquired; Stage-I forest clearance received on 22 December 2025.
5	Gumla–Palma	63	Completed.
6	Palma–Ranchi	23	Completed.
7	Ormanjhi–Gola	28	Under construction, with 87% physical progress.
8	Gola–Bokaro	32	Under construction, with 75% physical progress.
9	Bokaro–Dhanbad	57	Completed.

=== Construction in Chhattisgarh ===
On 22 April 2026, the National Highways Authority of India (NHAI) commenced construction on the 104.25 km Pathalgaon–Kunkuri–Chhattisgarh/Jharkhand border section of the corridor in Chhattisgarh. The project has an estimated investment of ₹3,147 crore.

The 627 km corridor includes approximately 384 km within Chhattisgarh. The Pathalgaon–Jharkhand border section passes through the Jashpur region and is intended to improve connectivity to towns including Pathalgaon, Kansabel, Kunkuri, Duldula and Jashpur.

The construction plan for this section includes 382 structures, comprising seven major bridges, 30 minor bridges, six flyovers, one elevated viaduct, ten vehicular underpasses, 18 light vehicular underpasses, 26 small vehicular underpasses, 21 pedestrian and cattle underpasses, and 278 box culverts.

The corridor is intended to improve freight transportation between industrial centres in Chhattisgarh and Jharkhand, particularly coal mines and steel-producing regions.

=== Construction in Jharkhand ===
The Gumla–Palma, Palma–Ranchi and Bokaro–Dhanbad sections were reported as completed in the January 2026 parliamentary status report. The Ormanjhi–Gola and Gola–Bokaro sections remained under construction, with reported physical progress of 87% and 75%, respectively.

The Chhattisgarh/Jharkhand border–Gumla section was also undergoing pre-construction activities, including land acquisition and forest-clearance procedures.

== See also ==
- Expressways in Chhattisgarh
- Expressways of India
- Industrial corridor
- Eastern Economic Corridor (India)
