= Raipur–Bilaspur Expressway =

Road in Chhattisgarh, India

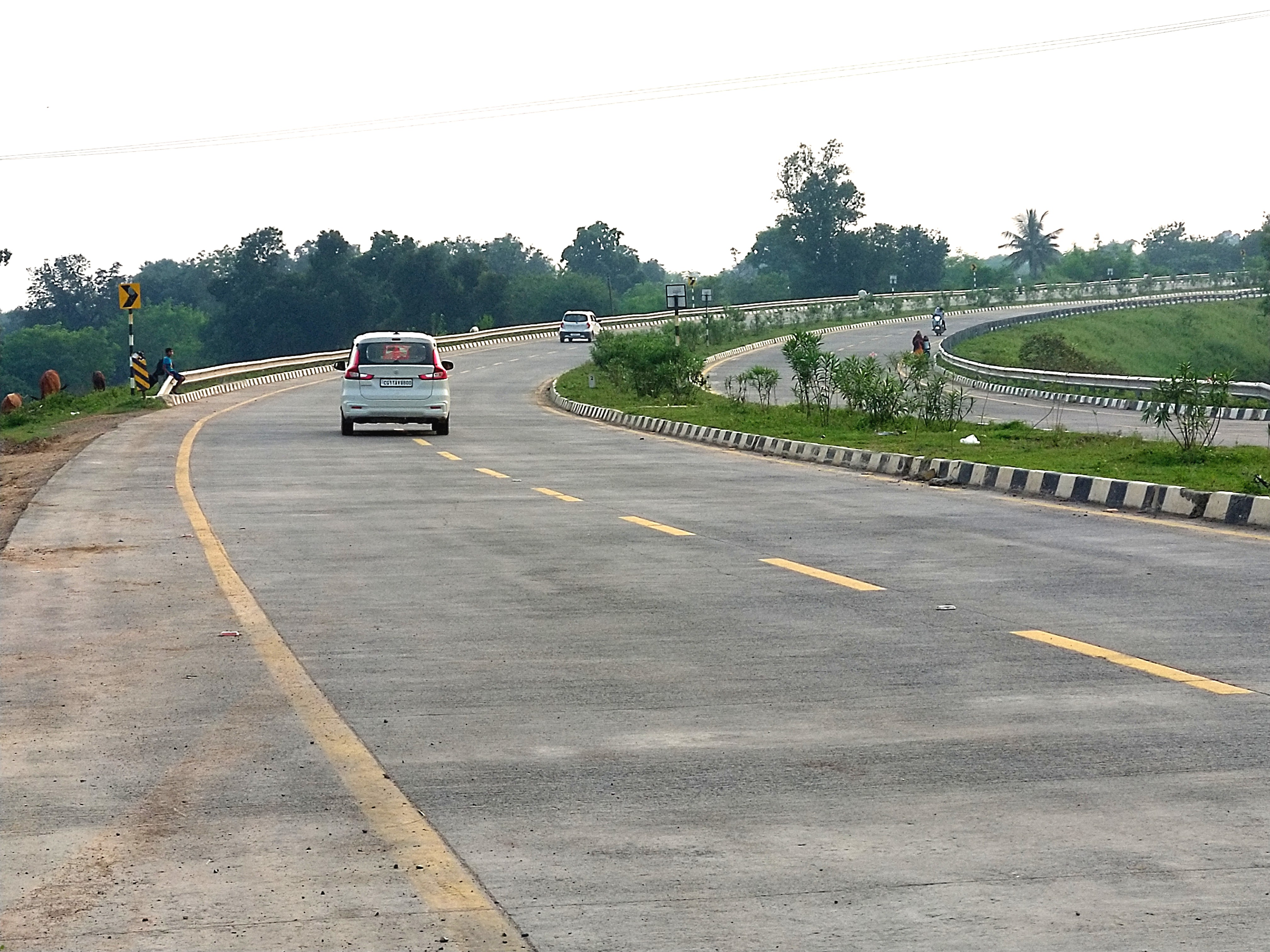

Route information
- Length: 127 km (79 mi)

Major junctions
- North end: Darrighat, Bilaspur
- South end: Tatibandh, Raipur

Location
- Country: India
- State: Chhattisgarh
- Major cities: Raipur, Bilaspur

Highway system
- Roads in India; Expressways; National; State; Asian; State Highways in Chhattisgarh

Raipur–Bilaspur Expressway is an 4/6 lane tolled expressway linking Bilaspur and Raipur, two key cities in Chhattisgarh State. The National Highway 130 and the National Highway 30 connect these cities. The highway stretches from Raipur to Bilaspur and is the busiest highway in the state.

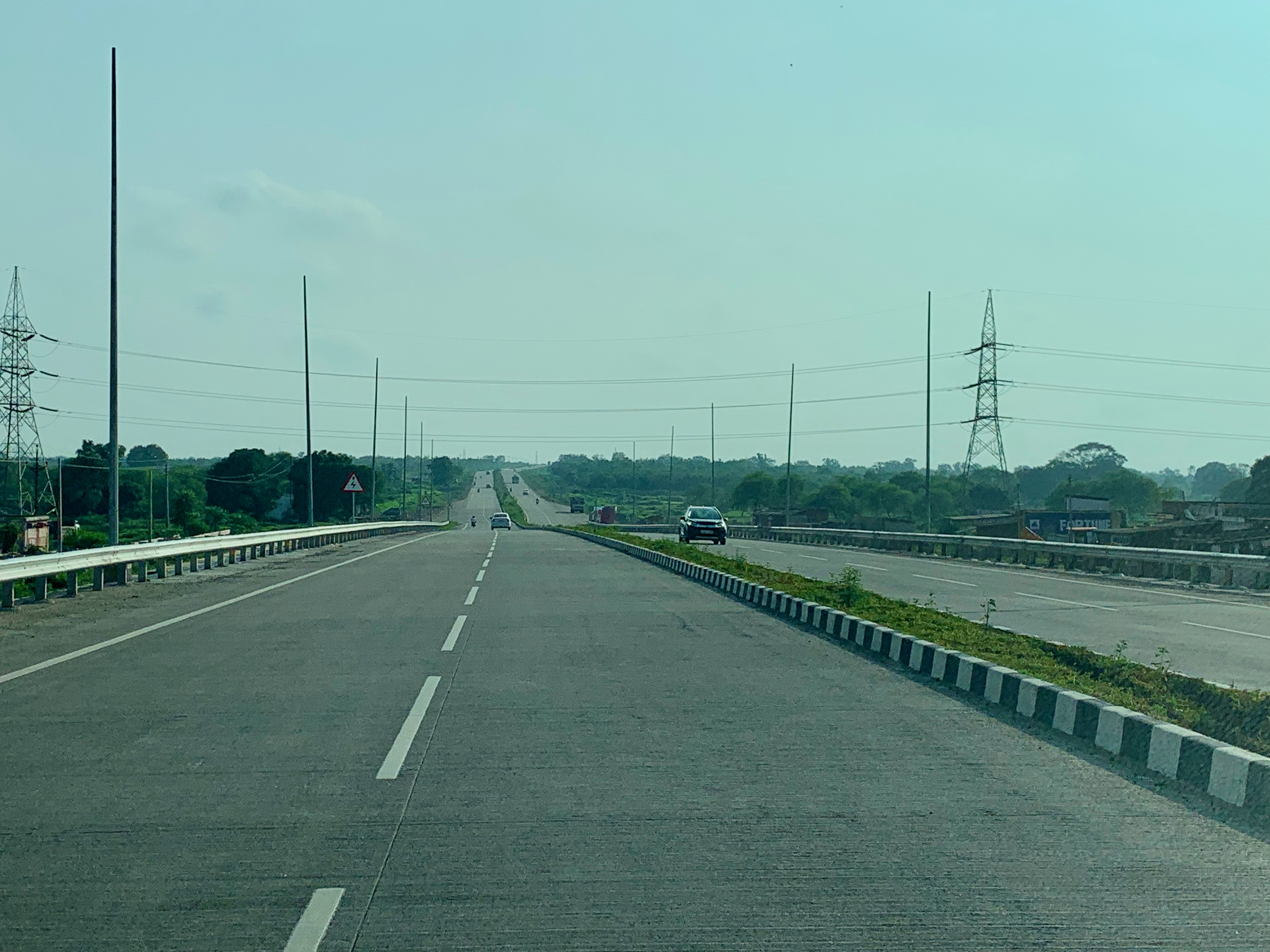
Raipur-Bilaspur Highway

The project was first conceived in 2012 but due to delays in land acquisition and the bankruptcy of the awarded contractor delayed the project for many years, In 2016 NHAI re-started the project and hired three contractors to complete the 127 km highway project. The highway was completed at the cost of 15.50 billion INR in May 2019. Raipur and Bilaspur are two significant Urban agglomeration and industrial cities. The road had been a most awaited project for the state government and its public for longtime since Chhattisgarh became a state in 2000.

== Salient Features & Gallery ==
Some data about the Raipur - Bilaspur Expressway:

- Length - 127 km (78.9 mi)
- Right of Way - 52 m (56.9 yd)
- Number of Lanes - 4 lanes
- Type of Pavement - Rigid (Concrete)
- Maximum Axle Load (Design) - 20 tonnes (22 short tons; 20 long tons)
- Bypasses - 7
- Interchange - 2
- Main Toll Plaza - 3
- Underpass - 35
- Railway Over Bridge - 1
- Major Bridge - 4
- Minor Bridge - 19
- Culverts - 172
- Vehicular Underpasses - 22
- Bus bays - 15
- Truck lay by bay - 2
- Flyover - 3

The Expressway has SOS booths along the route besides a toll-free helpline. CCTV cameras are installed every 5 km (3.1 mi) along the expressway for safety and accident assistance.

Whole 127 KM stretch which starts from Tatibandh chowk in Raipur and ends in Darrighat in Bilaspur. Its construction package was divided into three patches:

1. Bilaspur- Sargaon (36 km) (4- lane)
2. Sargaon - Simga (43 km) (4-lane)
3. Simga - Raipur (48 km) (4-6 lane)

This highway is said to be one of backbone infrastructures in state which connects entire northern part of the state to its capital city, Raipur.

== See also ==
- Expressways in Chhattisgarh
- Expressways in India
