= Inter-State Bus Terminal, Raipur =

Bus terminal in Chhattisgarh, India

Inter State Bus Terminal, Raipur अंतरराज्यीय बस टर्मिनल, रायपुर ISBT Bhatagaon आई.एस.बी.टी. भाठागांव

General information
- Other names: ISBT Ravanbhantha; ISBT Tikrapara; ISBT Mathpara
- Location: In front of Neelkantheshwar Dham, Ravanbhatha, Raipur, Chhattisgarh; India
- Coordinates: 21.22°N 81.630556°E
- System: Bus stand
- Owner: Dudhadhari Math Trust; Government of Chhattisgarh; Raipur Municipal Corporation
- Operator: Government of Chhattisgarh; Raipur Municipal Corporation
- Manager: Government of Chhattisgarh; Raipur Municipal Corporation
- Distance: 5 km from Raipur Junction; 16 km from Swami Vivekananda Airport
- Bus stands: 1
- Bus operators: 10+

Construction
- Parking: Yes
- Architectural style: Bus terminus Bus stand

Other information
- Status: Active
- Website: http://www.cgtransport.gov.in/ https://nagarnigamraipur.nic.in//

History
- Opened: 15 November 2021

Passengers
- Total: 7000+ (2024)
- Rank: 1st (in Central and Eastern)

Services
Parking, Shops, Food Courts, Hotels, Lounge, Waiting Room
Location
- Location within Chhattisgarh Location within India

Shri Balaji Swami Trust Sri Dudhadhari Math Inter State Bus Terminal, locally known as ISBT Bhatagaon, is a newly constructed hi-tech bus terminal situated on 25 acres in the Ravanbhata–Bhatagaon area of Raipur, Chhattisgarh. It is the first ISBT in Chhattisgarh and the largest bus station in Central India, with a capacity to handle 300 buses daily, offering a range of facilities to passengers.

The terminal serves as an Interstate Bus Terminal, providing bus services to passengers from neighboring states such as Maharashtra, Odisha, Uttar Pradesh, Madhya Pradesh, and Jharkhand. The primary purpose of constructing this terminal was to replace the Minimata Agam Dass Guru Bus Stand in Pandri, which had been causing traffic congestion and safety concerns. The new terminal, located on the outskirts of Raipur City, aims to alleviate these issues.

The ISBT Bhatagaon was inaugurated by Chhattisgarh Chief Minister Bhupesh Baghel on 20 August 2021. The terminal became operational on 15 November 2021, aligning with the occasion of Devotthan Ekadashi. Following its opening, the 28-year-old Pandri Bus Stand was permanently closed.

== Area ==
The area is made on 25 acres land of Dudhadhari Mandir, Raipur at the outskirts of Raipur City, the bus stand is located In front of Sri Har Nilkantheshwar Dhaam, a famous Shiv Temple in Raipur.

== Foundation laying, construction, inauguration and opening ==
The foundation stone laying ceremony for terminal was done by Chief Minister Bhupesh Baghel in the year 2019. The construction were done by Raipur Nagar Nigam and Government of Chhattisgarh.

=== Construction ===
The ISBT planned with a central building (G+4) providing transportation and commercial services. The surrounding to the building, the circulation has been planned which includes the services such as commercial, parking, diesel pump and other supporting facilities. The ground floor of the building will provide services for the commuters accessing the ISBT. Services like ticketing counters, waiting lobby, food counter, cloak room etc. are all planned at the ground floor for the ease of commuters. Along with these services, RUPTS proposes ATM vending machines at the Ground floor of ISBT. The Location for these ATMs are at right in the centre and close to the entrance of the building making them highly visible to the commuters and other common public. The location for the proposed ATMs’ have been highlighted in red colour in the drawing below. Each ATM has been allocated a space of approx.100 sq.fts.

=== Inauguration ===
After 2 years, Government of Chhattisgarh decided to inaugurate the terminal on 23 August 2021, on the Occasion of Bhupesh Baghel's Birthday but it preponed to 20 August as of Rajiv Gandhi Birthday, former Prime Minister of India and a senior Congress Leader.

=== Opening ===
After some days of Inauguration, the terminal wasn't started and the trial was scheduled to one week later of inauguration. But the Main Road for Connecting Terminal & Ring Road (Bhatagaon Chowk) was damaged as of Construction. After 1.5 Months the road was ready but due to the festive season the trial again postponed. Finally after Diwali, a three-day trial was scheduled from 10 November to 13 November 2021 which ordered by Raipur Collector Saurabh Kumar and the trial was successful. Now, Raipur Administration ordered to closed Pandri Stand by 15 November and the new stand will operated from 15 November. Between 13 and 14 November all shops and Buses shifted to ISBT and after 28 years Minimata Bus Stand, Pandri closed. At 6 am of 15 November 2021 on Devotthan Ekadashi the first bus depaurted from the ISBT.

== Controversies ==
There have been many disputes in the Terminal, the first dispute was between Dudhadhari Math Trust and the Government of Chhattisgarh, they were demanding for ownership of all shops in the terminal which was refused by the Government of Chhattisgarh and it was the main problem for the inauguration of terminal but was solved by May 2021. The other controversies are political disputes between BJP and INC. The last dispute was that the Terminal has been inaugurated but the services of all buses haven't started which was planned by 15 September but not done, the reason given by Government of Chhattisgarh is that the roads aren't ready so after roads will prepared and the buses will start. On this issue, BJP and other political parties keep besieging the state government from time to time. A three-day dry run or trial of buses on the ISBT was between 10 and 13 November 2021 and finally after 2 months of inauguration from 15 November 2021, the management for ISBT started and the old Pandri Stand closed.
