= Tarun Chatterji =

Indian politician

Tarun Chatterjee

Member of Madhya Pradesh Legislative Assembly
- In office 1990–2000
- Preceded by: Ranveer Singh Shastry
- Succeeded by: Post Abolished
- Constituency: Raipur Rural

Member of Chhattisgarh Legislative Assembly
- In office 2000–2003
- Preceded by: Post Established
- Succeeded by: Rajesh Munat
- Constituency: Raipur Rural

Personal details
- Born: 1949 East Pakistan (present–day Bangladesh)
- Died: January 15, 2017 (aged 67–68) Raipur, Chhattisgarh
- Party: Indian National Congress
- Other political affiliations: Janata Dal; Bharatiya Janata Party; Chhattisgarh Vikas Party

Tarun Prasad Chatterjee was an Indian politician from Indian National Congress. Previously, he was a member of Bharatiya Janata Party and Janata Dal. Chatterjee was three-time Mayor of Raipur Municipal Corporation.

Tarun Prasad Chatterjee was a frontline politician in Chhattisgarh. He held many important offices in Indian National Congress and government. He was elected Ward member of Rajatalab Ward in 1978.He was Raipur District Congress President from 1979 to 1987

In 1980 he was elected first time Madhya Pradesh Legislative Assembly from Raipur Rural constituency. In 1990, he was elected second time as a member of the Madhya Pradesh Legislative Assembly from Raipur Rural constituency then from November 2000 member of Chhattisgarh Legislative Assembly. He defeated Deenanath Sharma of Indian National Congress by 15,751 votes in 1998 Madhya Pradesh Assembly election.

In December 2001 he was 12 members of the state legislative assembly belonging to the Bharatiya Janata Party broke away and Chhattisgarh Vikas Party was led by Tarun Chatterji. Chhattisgarh Vikas Party was recognized by the Congress-affiliated Speaker of the assembly. The following day Chhattisgarh Vikas Party merged into the Indian National Congress.

He was appointed the Public Works Department (PWD) minister from 2002 to 2003 during the Ajit Jogi government.

He died on January 16, 2017, following a cardiac arrest. He is survived by his wife, two sons, and a daughter.
