= Raipur–Naya Raipur Expressway =

Road in Chhattisgarh, India

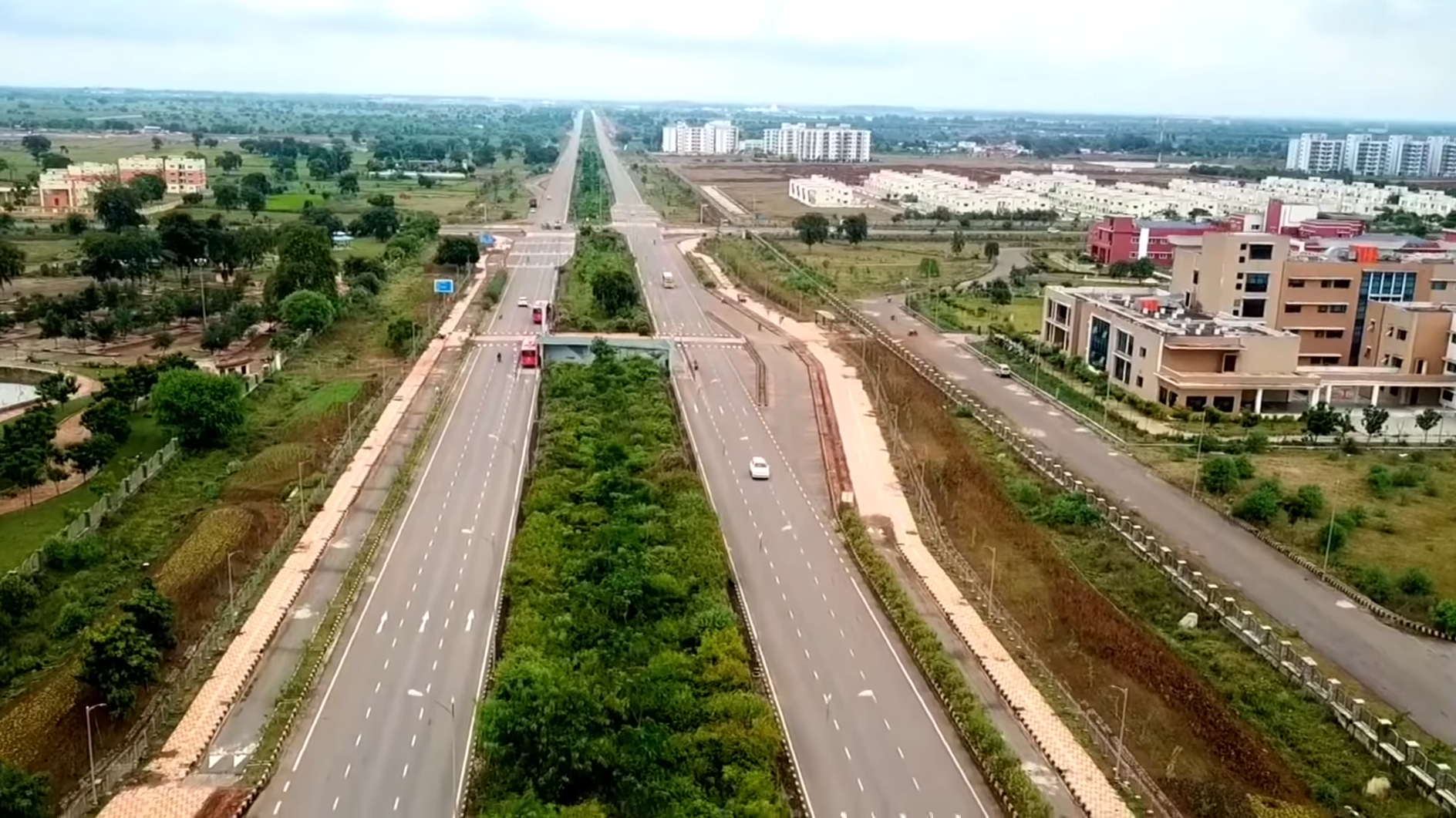
- Naya Raipur Capitol complex road

Route information
- Maintained by PWD, Government of Chhattisgarh
- Length: 12.7 km (7.9 mi)

Major junctions
- North end: Fafadih, Raipur
- South end: Shadani darbar, Naya Raipur

Location
- Country: India
- Major cities: Raipur, Naya Raipur

Highway system
- Roads in India; Expressways; National; State; Asian

The Raipur–Naya Raipur Expressway, also known as Atal Path Expressway, is an access-controlled, six-lane, 12.7-kilometre (7.9 mi) expressway connecting Raipur to Naya Raipur in the state of Chhattisgarh, India. It is a part of the larger project of Raipur–Visakhapatnam Expressway, a six-lane road for the economic corridor.

It was constructed to ease the traffic in the GE road, or NH-53, and provide faster access to Dhamtari road from Raipur Junction Railway Station. It serves 4 flyovers and 1 elevated corridor crossing over the GE road in between two ends of expressway.

As part of the Smart City, Atal Nagar (Naya Raipur) is also being developed in 2025.

== See also ==
- Expressways in Chhattisgarh
- Expressways in India
