= Dudhadhari temple =

Dudhadhari Math दूधाधारी मठ
- Location within Chhattisgarh Location within India Location within Asia

Religion
- Affiliation: Hinduism
- District: Raipur
- Deity: Ram; Balaji; Swami Balabhadradas

Location
- Location: Raipur
- State: Chhattisgarh
- Country: India
- Interactive map of Dudhadhari Math दूधाधारी मठ
- Coordinates: 21.224175806779524°N 81.62931818392799°E

Dudhadhari temple is a Hindu temple, located at Raipur Mathpara in the Indian state of Chhattisgarh. The current Head Priest (Mahant) of the temple is Rajeshri Dr. Mahant Ramsundar Das Ji Maharaj.

Sree Dudhdhari Math was founded by Sree Swami Balabhadradas Ji Maharaj, a monk belonging to 16th Century. As per legends Sree Swami Balabhadradas Ji Maharaj used to survive only on milk and hence came to be popularly known as Dudh Ahari Maharaj (one who consumes only milk). With the passage of time, for the sake of ease of pronunciation, the term evolved as Dudhdhari. The Math thus takes the name Dudhdhari Math.

The Math came under royal patronage of the-then Maratha ruler of Nagpur Maharaja Raghuraoji Bhonsle. The Maharaja brought out a royal charter as per which the head of Sree Dudhdhari Math would be conferred upon the title ‘Rajeshri’ and since then all the Heads/Mahant of the order were given the title of ‘Rajeshri’. Hence the first as well as founder Mahant of the institution was Rajeshri Mahant Balbhadradas Ji Maharaj, and as part of the same tradition the current Head of the Order is Rajeshri Dr. Mahant Ram Sundar Das Ji Maharaj, popularly known amongst the mass as Mahant Maharaj.
