= Meenal Choubey =

Indian politician

10th Mayor of Raipur
- Incumbent
- Assumed office 27 February 2025
- Preceded by: Dr. Gaurav K. Singh, IAS (Administrator)

Leader of Opposition, Raipur Municipal Corporation
- In office 26 March 2021 – 7 January 2025
- Deputy: Manoj Verma, BJP
- Preceded by: Suryakant Rathore, BJP
- Succeeded by: Sandeep Sahu, INC

Councillor, Raipur Municipal Corporation
- In office 5 January 2010 – 7 January 2025
- Succeeded by: Durga Sahu, BJP
- Constituency: Khubchand Baghel Ward

Personal details
- Born: October 16, 1972 (age 53) Raipur, Madhya Pradesh (present-day Raipur, Chhattisgarh, India)
- Party: Bharatiya Janata Party
- Spouse: Chagan Choubey
- Education: Pandit Ravishankar Shukla University
- Occupation: Politician

Meenal Chagan Choubey is an Indian politician from Chhattisgarh, presently serving as the Mayor of Raipur, capital city of Chhattisgarh since 2025. Belonging to Bharatiya Janata Party, she is a senior politician in the city who served as Leader of Opposition in Raipur Municipal Corporation and Councillor (Parshad) from Khubchand Baghel Ward of Raipur for three consecutive terms.

== Early life and education ==
Choubey was born in 1972 in a Brahmin family. She has done his post graduation from Pandit Ravishankar Shukla University. She entered student politics through ABVP.

== Political career ==
She has been continuously active in the BJP Mahila Morcha in the form of agitations, sit-ins and demonstrations. She had earlier been the Leader of Opposition in the Municipal Corporation Council. She has worked on many posts in the Councillor, District and State Women BJP Front. She has also been a BJP councilor three times. Meenal is also active in the organization. Along with this, she is one of the senior councilors of Raipur Municipal Corporation.

== Mayor of Raipur (2025–present) ==
She became the mayor of Raipur in February 2025 by defeating the Congress candidate by 1,53,290 votes. She is the second woman and non-Congress mayor of Raipur to be elected.

== Elections contested ==
=== Raipur Municipal Corporation ===
Year	Post	Result	Vote Percentage	Opposition Candidate	Opposition Party	Opposition Vote Percentage
2025	Mayor	Won	62.03	Deepti Dubey	INC	31.92
