= All India Institute of Medical Sciences, Raipur =

Medical institute in Chhattisgarh, India

- Motto: Arogyam Sukha Sampada
- Motto in English: Health is Wealth and Happiness
- Type: Public
- Established: 20 June 2012; 14 years ago
- Endowment: ₹11.24 billion (US$120 million) (2021–22 est.)
- President: Dr. Sanjeev Handa
- Director: Lt. Gen. (Dr.) Ashok Jindal
- Faculty: 142
- Students: 660
- Undergraduates: 500
- Postgraduates: 160
- Location: Raipur, Chhattisgarh, India; 21°15′27″N 81°34′39″E
- Campus: Urban 103.63 acres (0.4 km^{2})
- Website: www.aiimsraipur.edu.in
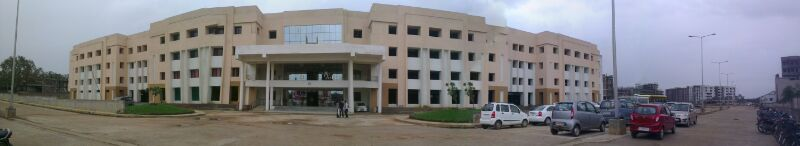

All India Institute of Medical Sciences, Raipur (AIIMS Raipur) is a public medical college located in Raipur, Chhattisgarh, India. It is one of the six AIIMS institutions established in 2012, and it operates autonomously under the Ministry of Health and Family Welfare, Government of India.

== History ==
It was established in 2012. The total campus accounts for an area of about 100 acres on the outskirts of the city. Being geographically located in the centre of India, it lodges students from all over the country, particularly states like Kerala, Rajasthan, Maharashtra, Andhra Pradesh, Telangana, Madhya Pradesh, Uttar Pradesh, Haryana, Chhattisgarh, etc.

All-India Institute of Medical Sciences Amendment Act, 2012 replaced the Ordinance which allowed the six AIIMS—like institutes to become operational from September 2012. The All-India Institute of Medical Sciences (Amendment) Bill, 2012, was introduced in the Lok Sabha on 27 August 2012. Lok Sabha passed the AIIMS (Amendment) Bill, 2012 on 30 August 2012. Bill was then introduced in Rajya Sabha on 3 September 2012. Rajya Sabha passed the Bill on 4 September 2012. Bill got its assent from the President of India, Pranab Mukherjee on 12 September 2012 and the Act came into force. The proposed measure will help the Centre change the status of the six new AIIMS registered under the Indian Societies Registration Act to be autonomous body corporate on the lines of the existing AIIMS in Delhi.

== Campus ==
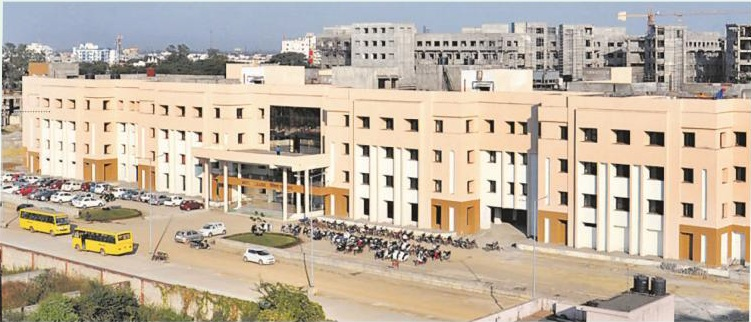
AIIMS Raipur Medical College (building)

AIIMS Raipur is located on GE Road, near the Tatibandh Gurudwara in Raipur. Built at a cost of ₹840 crore (US$87 million), AIIMS Raipur is spread over an area of 103.63 acres (0.4 km^{2}), where the hospital and college complex occupies 63.85 acres (0.3 km^{2}) while a separate residential complex in Kabir Nagar is on 39.78 acres (0.2 km^{2}).

Being located in an easily accessible location in the major city of Raipur, the institute answers to the medical needs of a majority of the population of Central India including Chhattisgarh, parts of eastern Maharashtra (Vidarbha Region), Madhya Pradesh and Odisha. The college is 26 kilometers from Swami Vivekananda Airport and 10.6 kilometers from Raipur Junction railway station.

Its campus houses several hospitals and institutions in addition to Medical College Hospital (MCH), including the College of Nursing, Dental College, State Virology Lab, etc.

== Rankings ==
University and college rankings

Medical – India
- NIRF (2024): 38
- India Today (2024): 24

The institute is ranked 38th among medical colleges in India in 2024 by the National Institutional Ranking Framework (NIRF) medical ranking.

== Academics ==
=== Admission ===
Admissions to the college for MBBS course are carried out through NEET-UG. 125 students are admitted to the course each year. Currently, departments for all postgraduate subjects are functional, and many super speciality departments have also begun training. The institute also offers undergraduate courses for Nursing and Paramedical.

The institute admitted its first batch of 50 MBBS students in September 2012. Since 2013, it admits 100 MBBS students per year. Currently, from 2020 onwards, it admits 125 MBBS students per year.

=== Academic programmes ===
The institute provides the courses on :

- Undergraduate Education
- Postgraduate Education
- Doctoral Courses
- Nursing Education
- Dental Education

== Glimpses of AIIMS Raipur ==
Outside View from Medical College

Nursing College

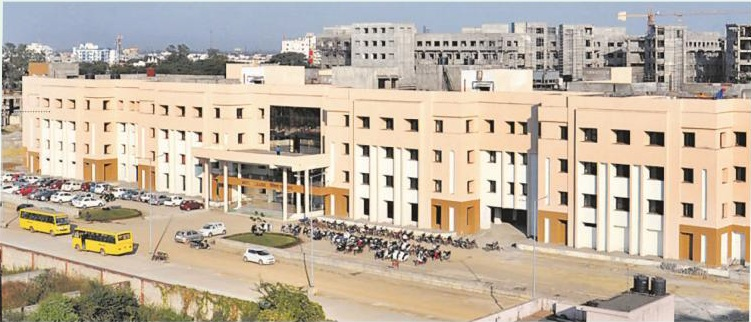

== See also ==
- All India Institute of Medical Sciences
- All India Institute of Medical Sciences, Bhopal
- All India Institute of Medical Sciences, Rishikesh
- All India Institute of Medical Sciences, Jodhpur
- All India Institute of Medical Sciences, Patna
- All India Institute of Medical Sciences, Kalyani
- Education in India
- List of medical colleges in India
