= List of state highways in Chhattisgarh =

Chhattisgarh state has over 20 national highways with total length of 512 km and many state highways with total length of 4,136.85 km. The state highways are arterial routes of a state, linking district headquarters and important towns within the state and connecting them with national highways or Highways of the neighboring states.

== Type of road and its length ==
No.	Type of Road	Total length of the route (in km)
1	State highways	4,136.85
2	Major district road	11,580.94
3	Other district road	1,511.18
4	Rural road	12,634.69
	Total	29,863.66

== Expressways ==
List of expressways in Chhattisgarh is listed with horizontal (west to east) expressways first, followed by vertical (north to south) & diagonal expressways.

Bigger Route	Name of Expressway	States	Total Length (km/mi)	Length Bihar (km/mi)	Cost (₹cr)	Type	Status	Direction	Comment
Durg-Arang (West to East)	Durg-Bhilai-Raipur Expressway	Chhattisgarh	27 km (16.8 mi)	27 km (16.8 mi)	95 cr	Greenfield	Operational	W to E	Through these cities.
Durg-Arang (West to East)	Durg–Raipur–Arang Expressway	Chhattisgarh	57 km (35 mi)	57 km (35 mi)		Greenfield	Under-construction	W to E	Via south of these cities.
Durg-Arang (West to East)	Raipur–Naya Raipur Expressway	Chhattisgarh	12.7 km (7.9 mi)	12.7 km (7.9 mi)		Brownfield	Operational	W to E	Series of flyovers part of NH-53.
Gwalior-Sagar-Raipur-Visakhapatnam (NW to SE)	Lakhnadon-Raipur Expressway (Seoni-Raipur Expressway)	Chhattisgarh, Madhya Pradesh	300 km (186.4 mi)		5,000	Greenfield	Under-construction	NW to C	From NW of Chhattisgarh to centre of Chhattisgarh at Raipur.
Gwalior-Sagar-Raipur-Visakhapatnam (NW to SE)	Raipur–Visakhapatnam Expressway	Chhattisgarh, Andhra Pradesh	509 km (316 mi)			Greenfield	Under-construction	C to SE	From center of Chhattisgarh at Raipur to southwest to Visakhapatnam port.
Patna-Korba-Bilaspur-Raipur-Hydrabad (NE to SW)	Bilaspur-Raipur Expressway	Chhattisgarh	127 km (79 mi)	127 km (79 mi)		Brownfield	Operational	NW to C	Part of NH-30 & NH-130.
Patna-Korba-Bilaspur-Raipur-Hydrabad (NE to SW)	Raipur–Hyderabad Expressway	Chhattisgarh, Telangana	519 km (322 mi)		45,000	Greenfield	Under-construction	NE to SW	Will reduce distance 780 km to 519 km & reduce 7 hours travel time to 4 hours.
Raipur-Dhanbad Economic Corridor (Central to Eastern)	Raipur-Ranchi-Dhanbad Expressway	Chhattisgarh, Jharkhand	707 km (439 mi)			Greenfield, Brownfield	Under-Construction	Central to Eastern	Will reduce 16 hours travel time to 9 hours

== List of state highways ==
Number	Length (km)	Length (mi)	Southern or western terminus	Northern or eastern terminus	Formed	Removed	Notes
SH 1	79.4	49.3	Ambikapur-stone-Dharamjigarh - Raigarh route		—	—	
SH 2	110.4	68.6	Pipari (U.P.) Dhanwar-Pratapur- Ambikapur- and Raipur- Abhanpur-Gariyand-Mainpur - Debharog - Geanipatnam (Olyca) route		—	—	
SH 3	188.5	117.1	Ranchi (Jharkhand) Ramanujganj - Vadrafnagar-Semariya-Samarpur-Jai Singh Nagar (M.P.)		—	—	
SH 4	183.4	114.0	Dindori (M.P.) - Kabir Chabutra-Penlandra-Vasan-Kutghora - Korba-Karatla-Majjagarh - Pathalgaon-Konepara - Rourkela (Orissa) route		—	—	
SH 5	559.6	347.7	Shahdol (M.P.) - Pandaria-Kawardha-Khairagarh-Chhuikhadan-Rajanandgaon-Artgarh-Ghidam-Baladila - Bhadrachalam (Andhra Pradesh) route		—	—	
SH 6	191.2	118.8	Khariyar (Olysa) - Manpur-Mukhwa-Kanker-Manpur - Gadhichiroli (Maharashtra)		—	—	
SH 7	168.2	104.5	Bilaspur-Mungeli -Newagarh-Bemetara-Thrangha-Durg - Balod-Manpur Marg		—	—	
SH 8	261.6	162.6	Bilaspur-Kota-Siddappur-Kenwachi-Gaurela-Kotami-Mariti-Menragarh-Kelhari-Janakpur - Old Aunty (MP) route		—	—	
SH 9	51.6	32.1	Raipur-Baloudazar-Kasadol-Shivariarayan-Birra-Champa - Korba Marg		—	—	
SH 10	148.2	92.1	Kota-Lorami-Pandaria-Mungeli-Nandaghat-Bhatapara-Baloda Bazar route		—	—	
SH 12	234.9	146.0	Patna-Bhaiyathan-Pratappur-Kandari-Samari-Kusmi - Nilkanthpur - Amakona - Jashpurnagar (up to Orissa Limit)		—	—	
SH 13	74.9	46.5	Pamgarh-Shivrinarayan - Biligarh-Sarangh-Baramkela - Suhaila (Orissa) route		—	—	
SH 14	55	34	Patha-Kasadol-Baloda Bazar		—	—	
SH 15	147.4	91.6	Kendi-Burader-Bakunthpur-Sonhath-Ramgarh (MP to the extent)		—	—	
SH 16	273.63	170.03	Lamili (Bhaiyathan) - Surajpur-Udaipur-Shyang-Kudamura-Sakti-Malakharoda - Hasod-Saraswa-Saripali-Padampur (Orissa) route		—	—	
SH 17	256.2	159.2	Kunkuri-Batuli-Garden-Raikera-Kunkuri-Lavakera-Kotba Lailunga-Gharghoda-bark route		—	—	
SH 18	80.8	50.2	Hiti-Khasia-Dabhara-Chandrapur route		—	—	
SH 19	96.2	59.8	Pithaura-Bagabahra-Koshan-Hind		—	—	
SH 20	164.7	102.3	Simaga-Tilda-Rhora-Arang- Navapara (Rajim) -MagarLoad - Dhamtari route		—	—	
SH 21	44	27	Kumi-Patharia-Thrangha-Gandi-Schhettakari route		—	—	
SH 22	127.22	79.05	Abhanpur-Patan-Durg-Jalbandha-Khairagarh-Laji (Madhyapradesh) route		—	—	
SH 23	85.8	53.3	Rajnandgaon-Fooder		—	—	
SH 24	100.8	62.6	Rajnandgaon-Dongargaon-Ambagarh-Mohala-Manpur Marg		—	—	
SH 25	108.6	67.5	Bhanupratappur-Durgukondal-Kapsi-Pakhanjur-Bande-Irpanar route		—	—	
SH 26	131.3	81.6	Maroda (Bande)-Chalkot-Garpa-Sonpur-Narayanpur-Kondagaon-Amravati-Eral-Umarkot (Orissa) route		—	—	
SH 28	126	78	Bijapur-Adapalli-Jagargunda		—	—	
SH 29	87.3	54.2	Champa - Seoni - Suddenpur - Pubar - Tudreri - Raigad Marg Total length 85.30 km		—	—	
1.000 mi = 1.609 km; 1.000 km = 0.621 mi

== See also ==
- Transport in India
