= Satyanarayan Sharma =

Indian politician

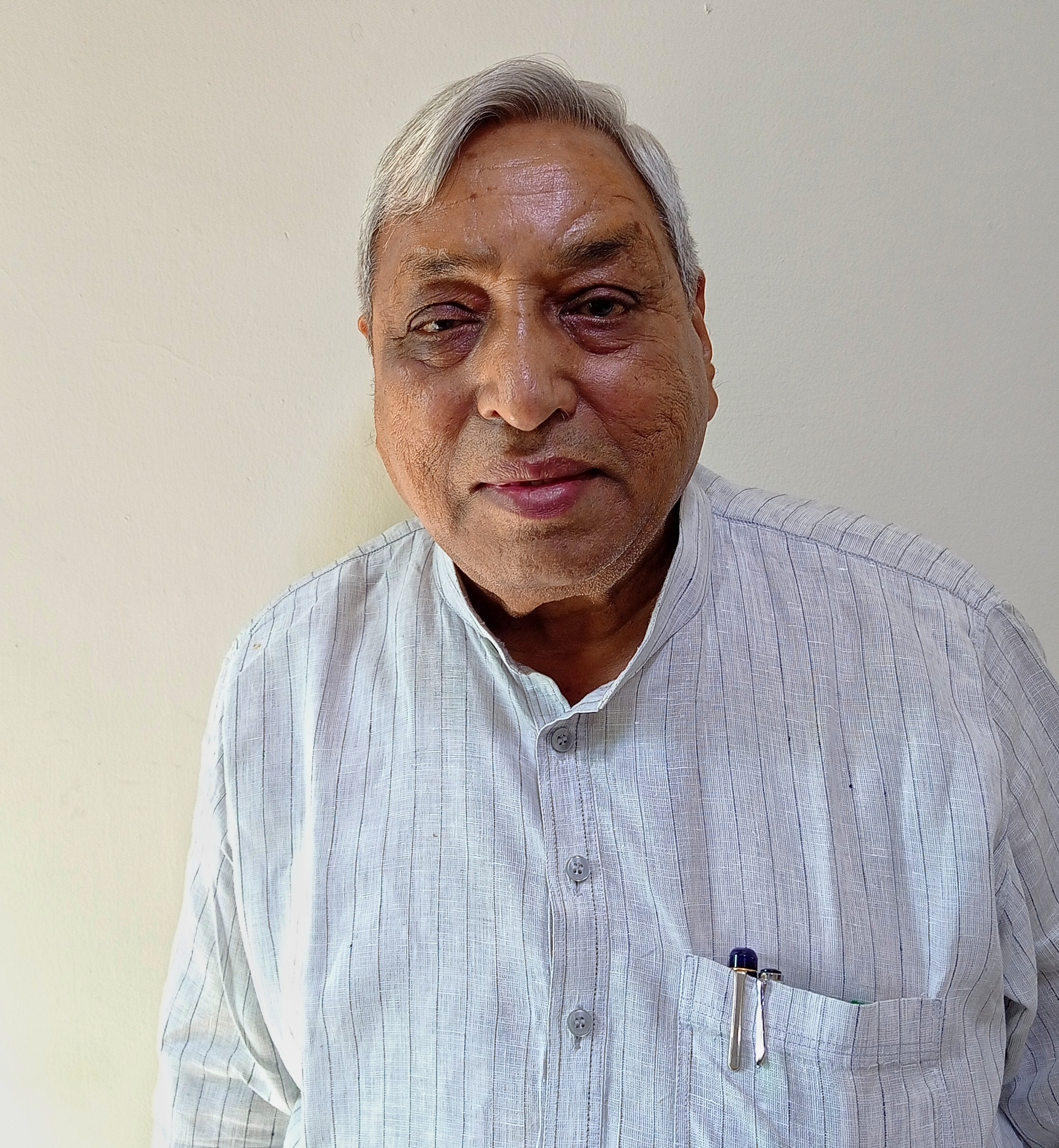

Member of the Chhattisgarh Legislative Assembly
- In office 2013–2023
- Preceded by: Nand Kumar Sahu
- Succeeded by: Motilal Sahu
- Constituency: Raipur City Gramin
- In office 2000–2008
- Constituency: Mandirhasod

Member of the Madhya Pradesh Legislative Assembly
- In office 1985–2000
- Constituency: Mandirhasod

Satyanarayan Sharma (born 17 January 1943) is an Indian politician, belonging to Indian National Congress. He completed his 7th term as an MLA, representing Raipur City Gramin (Vidhan Sabha constituency) constituency, Chhattisgarh. He has earlier served as a Minister in Chhattisgarh and Madhya Pradesh. He was a pro-tem Speaker of the fourth legislative assembly of Chhattisgarh.

== Background ==
Satyanarayan Sharma was born on 17 January 1943. He is the son of Jagdish Prasad Sharma and the great-grandson of freedom fighter and editor Jhabarmal Sharma.

== Personal life ==
He is married to Smt Nirmal Sharma. He has three sons.

== Political career ==
He was first elected as an MLA in 1985 in the undivided Madhya Pradesh. Subsequently, he was elected an MLA 6 times in 1990, 1993, 1998, 2003, 2013, and 2018. He was appointed Minister of State (Independent Charge), Mineral Resources, Madhya Pradesh Government in 1995.

In 1998, he was elevated to Cabinet Minister of Commercial Tax (Sales Tax) and Public Relations in the Madhya Pradesh Government. In December 1998, after the Assembly elections, he was made the Cabinet Minister for Commercial Tax (Sales Tax), Excise and Registration.

He was appointed Cabinet Minister for Education (School, Higher, and Technical), Human Resource Department, Culture, and Science & Technology in the Chhattisgarh government in the year 2000.

He was in consideration of becoming the Chief Minister in 2018. Earlier, in 2000, when the state of Chhattisgarh was newly formed, he was in consideration of becoming the Chief Minister.

He currently represents Raipur City Gramin (Vidhan Sabha constituency) in Chhattisgarh Legislative Assembly.

== Other positions held ==
Sharma was elected as Vice President of Bharat Scouts and Guides in 2013. He is a member of the board of directors of the National Cooperative Housing Federation of India.
