= Raipur City Gramin Assembly constituency =

Legislative Assembly constituency in Chhattisgarh State, India

Coordinates: 21.32°N 81.55°E

Raipur Gramin
- Constituency No. 48 for the Chhattisgarh Legislative Assembly

Constituency details
- Country: India
- Region: Central India
- State: Chhattisgarh
- District: Raipur
- Lok Sabha constituency: Raipur
- Established: 2008
- Total electors: 349,371
- Reservation: None

Member of Legislative Assembly
- 6th Chhattisgarh Legislative Assembly
- Incumbent Motilal Sahu
- Party: Bharatiya Janata Party
- Elected year: 2023

Raipur City Rural also known as Raipur Gramin is one of the 90 Legislative Assembly constituencies of Chhattisgarh state in India. The seat was formed after the demolition of Raipur Town Vidhan Sabha Constituency in 2008. It is in Raipur district and is a segment of Raipur Lok Sabha constituency.

== Members of Vidhan Sabha ==
Year	Member	Party
Madhya Pradesh Legislative Assembly
Prior to 1977: Seat did not exist
1977	Ramesh Warlyani	Janata Party
1980	Tarun Prasad	Indian National Congress
1985	Ranveer Singh Shastry	Indian National Congress
1990	Tarun Prasad Chaterji	Janata Party
1993	Tarun Prasad Chaterji	Bharatiya Janata Party
1998	Tarun Prasad Chaterji	Bharatiya Janata Party
Chhattisgarh Legislative Assembly
2003	Rajesh Munat	Bharatiya Janata Party
2008	Nand Kumar Sahu	Bharatiya Janata Party
2013	Satyanarayan Sharma	Indian National Congress
2018	Satyanarayan Sharma	Indian National Congress
2023	Motilal Sahu	Bharatiya Janata Party

== Election results ==
=== 2023 ===
Chhattisgarh Legislative Assembly Election, 2023: Raipur Rural
Party	Candidate	Votes	%	±%
BJP	Motilal Sahu	113,032	54.98	+15.67
INC	Pankaj Sharma	77,282	37.59	−7.76
Jai Chhattisgarh Party	Dhirendra Sahu	5,485	2.67	
JCC	Manoj Kumar Banjare	2,243	0.94	−8.99
NOTA	None of the Above	730	0.36	−0.19
Majority		35,750	17.39	+11.35
Turnout		205599	58.85	−2.26
BJP gain from INC		Swing		

=== 2018 ===
Chhattisgarh Legislative Assembly Election, 2018: Raipur Rural
Party	Candidate	Votes	%	±%
INC	Satyanarayan Sharma	78,468	45.35	
BJP	Nand Kumar Sahu	68,015	39.31	
JCC	Panna Lal Sahu	17,175	9.93	
NOTA	None of the Above	955	0.55	
Majority		10,453	6.04	
Turnout		173,013	61.11	
INC hold		Swing		

=== 2013 ===
- Satyanarayan Sharma (INC) : 70,774 votes
- Nande Sahu (BJP) : 68,913

=== 1998 ===
1998 Madhya Pradesh Legislative Assembly election: Raipur Rural
Party	Candidate	Votes	%	±%
BJP	Tarun Prasad Chatterjee	71,294	55.06	
INC	Deenanath Sharma	55,543	42.89	
Chhattisgarh Mukti Morcha	Jaiprakash Panday	1,014	0.78	
AD	Mahendra Kashyap C.A.	874	0.67	
RPI	Vaman Rao Bagde	313	0.24	
Majority		15,751	12.17	
Turnout		129,491	52.96	
BJP hold		Swing		

=== 1980 ===
- Tarunprasad (INC-I) : 20463 votes
- Ramesh Varliyani (JNP-Secular) : 6553

=== 1977 ===
- Ramesh Warlyani (JNP) : 19,682 votes
- Swarup Chand Jain (INC) : 14,429

== See also ==
- Raipur
- Raipur district
- List of constituencies of the Chhattisgarh Legislative Assembly
