= Motilal Sahu =

Indian politician (born 1964)

Motilal Sahu (born 1964) is an Indian politician from Chhattisgarh. He is an MLA from Raipur City Gramin Assembly constituency in Raipur District. He won the 2023 Chhattisgarh Legislative Assembly election, representing the Bharatiya Janata Party.

== Early life and education ==
Sahu is from Raipur, Raipur District, Chhattisgarh. His late father, Dauwaram Sahu, was a farmer. He completed his Diploma in Civil Engineering at Kirorimal Government Polytechnic, Raigarh in 1985.

== Career ==
Sahu won from Raipur City Gramin Assembly constituency representing the Bharatiya Janata Party in the 2023 Chhattisgarh Legislative Assembly election. He polled 113,032 votes and defeated his nearest rival, Pankaj Sharma of the Indian National Congress, by a margin of 35,750 votes.
