= Raipur Municipal Corporation =

Administrative body for the city of Raipur, Capital of Chhattisgarh

Raipur Municipal Corporation रायपुर नगर पालिक निगम
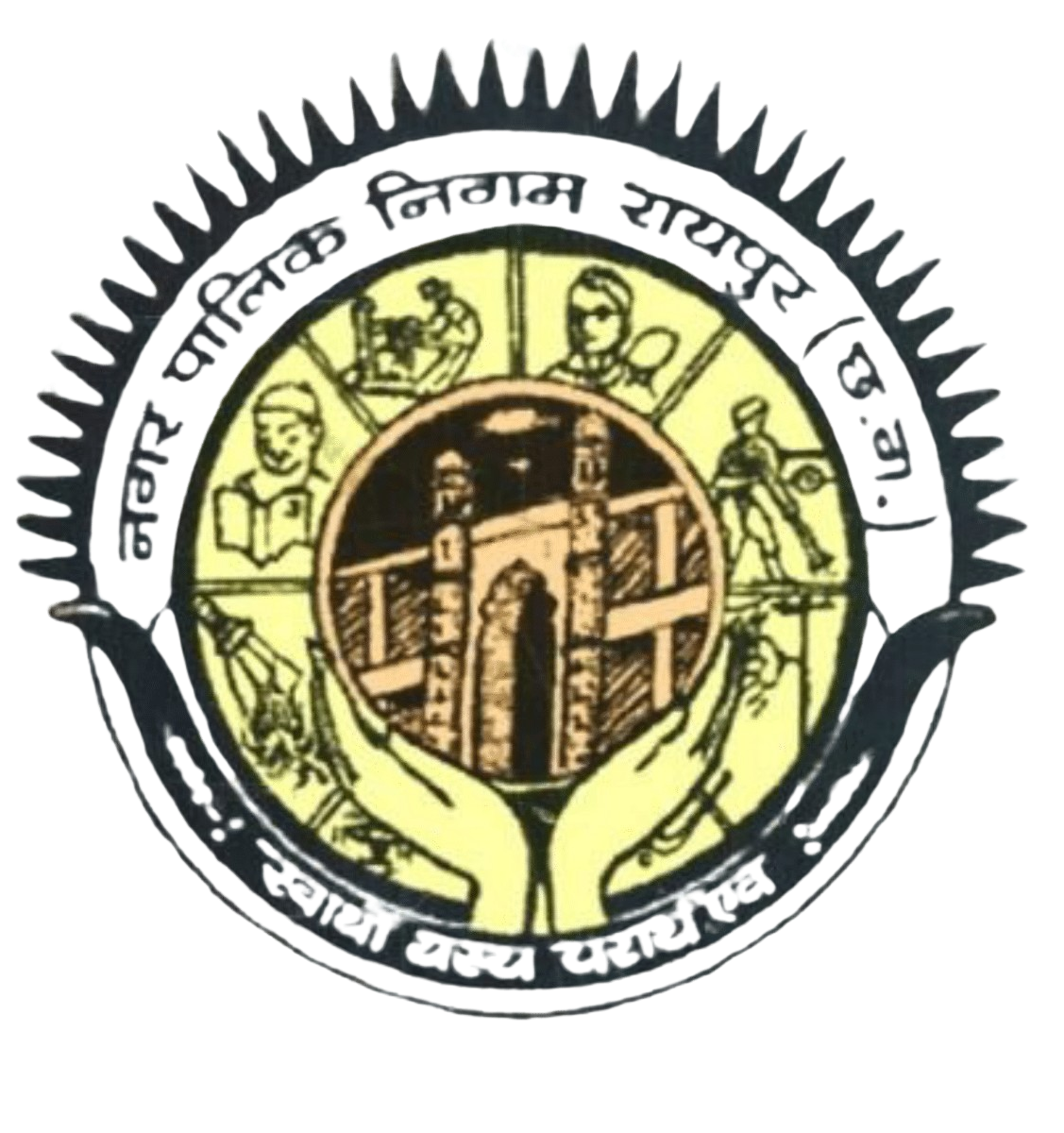

Type
- Type: Municipal Corporation
- Term limits: 5 years

History
- Founded: May 17, 1867; 159 years ago

Leadership
- Chairman of House (Speaker): Suryakant Rathore, BJP since 7 March 2025
- Leader of House (Mayor): Meenal Choubey, BJP since 27 February 2025
- Leader of the Opposition: Akash Tiwari, INC since 28 October 2025
- Deputy Leader of the Opposition: Jaishree Nayak, INC since 16 April 2025
- Municipal Commissioner: Vishwadeep, IAS since 5 March 2025

Structure
- Political groups: Government (61): BJP (61); Opposition (9): INC (8); IND (1)
- Length of term: 5 years

Elections
- Voting system: First-past-the-post
- Last election: 11 February 2025
- Next election: 2030

Motto
- स्वार्थो यस्य परार्थ एव: (Sanskrit); This self-interest is only for the welfare of others

Meeting place
- Mahatma Gandhi Sadan (White House), near Mahila Thana, Azad Chowk Road, Janta Colony, Raipur

Website
- nagarnigamraipur.nic.in

Raipur Municipal Corporation, or RMC, is the civic body responsible for the administration and development of Raipur, the capital city of Chhattisgarh, India. Established on 17 May 1867 as the Raipur Municipal Committee during British rule, it was later upgraded to a Municipal Corporation in 1973.

This civic administrative body administers the city's cleanliness and other public services like public health, clean streets and parks. The corporation ranked seventh in the Municipal Performance Index 2020 of the Union Ministry of Housing and Urban Affairs (MoHUA).

== History ==
=== British Raj ===
The Raipur Municipal Corporation originated as the Raipur Municipal Committee during British rule in India. Established in the late 19th century, its primary purpose was to ensure basic civic amenities in a rapidly growing urban settlement. The municipal committee was initially tasked with rudimentary responsibilities such as sanitation, road maintenance, and street lighting.

During this period, the committee operated under the Central Provinces and Berar administration, reflecting the administrative structures imposed by the British. Members were often nominated by the colonial administration, with only a small fraction being elected by property-owning residents under restrictive franchise rules. These elections were largely symbolic, with real power concentrated in the hands of the British-appointed officials.

Key initiatives included the establishment of water supply systems, waste disposal methods, and rudimentary public health facilities to cater to the growing population.

=== Post-Independence of India ===
==== As a part of Madhya Pradesh ====
After India gained independence in 1947, the municipal administration saw significant reforms. In 1956, with the reorganization of states, Raipur became part of the newly formed Madhya Pradesh state. This period marked the gradual expansion of the municipal body's responsibilities, including urban planning, housing, and infrastructure development.

The 1960s and 1970s were transformative years for the municipal administration. In 1973, the municipal committee was upgraded to a Municipal Corporation, a reflection of Raipur's growing significance and population by the cabinet of Arjun Singh. in 1973, city was divided into 40 wards. This transition allowed the civic body to expand its jurisdiction and take on larger development projects.

==== After formation of Chhattisgarh ====
A defining moment in RMC's history came in 2000 when Chhattisgarh was carved out of Madhya Pradesh, and Raipur was declared the capital of the new state. This change elevated the city's profile and brought about rapid urbanization. To cope with the growing administrative and developmental demands of a state capital, the corporation underwent structural and operational reforms.

In the 21st century, the Raipur Municipal Corporation embraced modernization and digital governance. With the introduction of the Smart City Mission in 2015, Raipur was selected as one of the cities for transformation into a smart city. The municipal corporation implemented projects aimed at improving urban mobility, traffic management, and environmental sustainability.

In recent years, RMC has focused on citizen-centric initiatives, such as online tax payment systems, e-governance platforms, and grievance redressal mechanisms. These efforts aim to enhance transparency and efficiency in municipal operations.

== Administration ==
RMC is headed by a mayor (head of Nigam) elected by the people and an IAS officer, who serves as municipal commissioner, named by the state's chief minister. Like other elections in India, in RMC the Parsahads (elected reprensentatives of wards) form the Nigam, and the elected leader of the majority party becomes mayor.

=== Mayor-in-Council (MIC) ===
The Mayor-in-Council (MIC) is the primary executive body of the Raipur Municipal Corporation, functioning as a "city cabinet" to oversee urban governance. Under the Chhattisgarh Municipalities Act, 1961, it is chaired by the Mayor, who nominates up to 14 elected councillors to lead specific departments such as Public Works (PWD), Water Supply, and Public Health. The council is responsible for policy implementation, approving financial expenditures, and preparing the annual municipal budget before it is presented to the general house for final approval.

==== MIC members ====
Raipur Nagar Nigam - Mayor-in-Council (MIC) Members
S.No.	Member Name	Department / Portfolio
1	Meenal Choubey	Mayor
2	Deepak Jaiswal	Public Works Department (PWD)
3	Dr. Anamika Singh	General Administration
4	Manoj Verma	Urban Planning and Building Permission
5	Manoj Avatar Bagal	Revenue
6	Santosh Sahu	Water Works Department
7	Gayatri Chandrakar	Public Health and Sanitation Department
8	Suman Ashok Pandey	Electricity and Engineering
9	Mahendra Khodiyar	Finance, Accounts, and Audit Department
10	Khem Kumar Sen	Urban Poverty Alleviation and Social Welfare
11	Sarita Dubey	Women and Child Development
12	Sanjana Hiyal	Scheduled Caste and Scheduled Tribe (SC/ST)
13	Amar Gidwani	Culture Department
14	Nand Kishore Sahu	Sports and Youth Welfare
15	Bhola Sahu	Environment and Horticulture Department

=== Parshads (Councillors) of all Wards (Zone wise) ===
Zone-wise Ward List of Raipur Municipal Corporation
Zone	Ward No.	Ward Name	Areas Included	Parshad (Councillor)	
Zone 1	3	Sant Kabir Das Ward	Gogaon, Sitanagar, Suryanagar, Godanwara, Sukhram Nagar	Dr. Manmohan Manhare	BJP
Zone 1	4	Yati Yatan Lal Ward	Vijay Nagar, Koyla Para, Timber Market, Govardhan Nagar, Ganga Nagar	Nand Kishore Sahu	BJP
Zone 1	5	Banjari Mata Ward	Rameshwar Nagar, Kavilas Nagar, Sendhwar Para, Chandrakar Para	Ambika Sahu	BJP
Zone 1	15	Kanhaiyalal Banjari Ward	Gudhiyari, Srinagar, Mahesh Colony, Deendayal Upadhyay Nagar, Gas Godam Area	Rajesh Kumar Dewangan	BJP
Zone 1	16	Veer Shivaji Ward	Sahu Para, Santoshi Nagar, Sanyasi Para, Satnami Para, Shaheed Nagar	Gajju Sahu	BJP
Zone 1	17	Thakkar Bapa Ward	Prem Nagar, Gulab Nagar, Diksha Nagar, Shivanand Nagar	Parmila Balla Ram Sahu	BJP
Zone 1	18	Bal Gangadhar Tilak Ward	Ashok Nagar, Tilak Nagar, Ekta Nagar	Sohan Lal Sahu	BJP
Zone 2	6	Virangana Avantibai Ward	Trimurti Nagar, Balmiki Nagar, Railway Colony, Ghaspara	Khagapati Soni	BJP
Zone 2	13	Rajiv Gandhi Ward	Devendra Nagar Sector-3, Paras Nagar, Sahu Para, Indira Awas, Shastri Nagar	Mahendra Khodiyar	BJP
Zone 2	14	Raman Mandir Ward	Chuna Bhatti, Narmada Para, Lodhipara, Raman Mandir, Kumhar Para, Jagriti Nagar, Patrakar Colony	Suryakant Rathore	BJP
Zone 2	26	Danveer Bhamashah Ward	Shukrawari Bazar, Mangal Bazar, Sahu Para Gudhiyari, Tulsi Nagar, Kukri Para	Ramhin Kurre	BJP
Zone 2	27	Indira Gandhi Ward	Ganj Mandi, Jawahar Nagar, Kelkar Para, Jora Para, Raipur Railway Station, Nivedita School	Avatar Bharti Bagal	BJP
Zone 2	28	Shaheed Hemu Kalyani Ward	Officer Colony, Sai Mandir Area, Devendra Nagar Sector-1, 2, 4, City Center Mall Area, Pandri Bus Stand Area	Smt. Kritika Jain	BJP
Zone 2	36	Tatyapara Ward	Modhapara, Subhash Nagar Basti, Mekahara Hospital, Dental College, Shaheed Smarak Bhavan, Zone No. 2 Office, Afroz Bagh, Gujarati School Area, Sindhi Bazar	Smt. Shweta Vishwakarma	BJP
Zone 3	10	Rani Laxmibai Ward	Ashoka Ratan, Karishma Tower, V.V. Vihar, L.I.C. Colony, Adarsh Nagar, Golden Homes, Aman Nagar, Prem Nagar, Indira Kusht Basti	Devdutt Dwivedi	BJP
Zone 3	11	Dr. Bhimrao Ambedkar Ward	Khapra Bhatti, Anupam Nagar, Shakti Nagar, Rajiv Nagar, Pilati Kalinagar	Mohan Kumar Sahu	BJP
Zone 3	12	Kalimata Ward	Narayana Hospital, Mandi Area, Sambleshwari Nagar, Chandrashekhar Nagar, Lodhipara, District Hospital (Kusht Basti), Devendra Nagar Sector-5, Ganga Nagar, Durga Nagar	Smt. Sadhna Pramod Sahu	BJP
Zone 3	29	Guru Govind Singh Ward	Behera Colony, Jagannath Nagar, Taj Nagar, Mayur Club, Khadi Gram Udyog Area	Kailash Behera	BJP
Zone 3	30	Shankar Nagar Ward	Shankar Nagar, Ishwari Nagar, New Shanti Nagar, Gorkha Colony	Rajesh Gupta	BJP
Zone 3	34	Ravishankar Shukla Ward	Rajatalab, Anand Nagar, Vinoba Bhave Nagar, Kundrapara, Shanti Nagar	Akash Tiwari (Note: Leader of Opposition in RMC; won as Independent, but later joined INC)	INC
Zone 3	48	Guru Ghasidas Ward	Dewar Basti, Telibandha B.S.U.P, Jal Vihar Colony, Gurudwara Shyam Nagar, Indra Chowk, Pritam Singh Saini School, Radha Krishna Mandir, Maharana Pratap Garden, Santoshi Nagar, Kapoor Hotel	Mahesh Kumar Dhruv	BJP
Zone 4	35	Abdul Hameed Ward	Collectorate Area, Indravati Colony, Forest Colony, Ravi Nagar, Dhobipara, Noorani Masjid Area	Sheikh Musheer	INC
Zone 4	44	Swami Vivekanand Sadar Bazar Ward	Brahman Para, Kankali Para, Panchpath Para, Suhaga Mandir, Dhobipara, Sarthi Chowk	Murli Sharma	BJP
Zone 4	45	Maulana Abdul Rauf Ward	Nayapara, Kamasi Para, Budhatalab, Sadar Bazar, Satti Bazar, Gol Bazar, Dani Bada, Budhapara, Shyam Talkies Area	Arruman Aijaz Dhebar	INC
Zone 4	46	Civil Lines Ward	Bans Tal, Ganeshram Nagar, Jawahar Bazar, Shastri Bazar, Chhotapara, Baidyanath Para, Nehru Nagar, Hanuman Nagar, Gandhi Nagar	Sanjana Hiyal	BJP
Zone 4	47	Mother Teresa Ward	Civil Lines, Utkal Nagar, Panchsheel Nagar, Satbahaniya Nagar, Katora Para Durga Mandir Area	Santosh Kumar Sahu	BJP
Zone 4	57	Bhagwati Charan Shukla Ward	Daga Chal, Gauli Mohalla, Chhoti Masjid, C.G. College, P. & T. Colony, Mahila Polytechnic, Prem Prakash Ashram, Punjabi Colony, Shailendra Nagar, Fun Fiesta Garden, Star Ground, Pension Bada Chaprasi Colony	Amar Gidwani	BJP
Zone 4	64	Vipin Bihari Sur Ward	Mathpara, Kailashpuri, Dulari Nagar, Gabhra Para, Veerbhadra Nagar, Pujari Nagar, Adarsh Nagar	Manoj Verma	BJP
Zone 5	40	Deendayal Upadhyay Ward	Shanti Vihar Colony, Danganiya, Rajkumar College Area, Krishna Nagar, Khadan Basti, Vivekananda Ashram Area	Ashu Chandravanshi	BJP
Zone 5	41	Pt. Sundar Lal Sharma Ward	Pt. Deendayal Upadhyay Housing Board Colony, Rohinipuram, Vinayaka Vihar, Kuber Griha Nirman Samiti, Krishna Sakha	Sarita Akash Dubey	BJP
Zone 5	42	Mahant Laxminarayan Das Ward	Sunder Nagar, Maitri Nagar, Bhim Nagar, Chandrashekhar Nagar, Hanuman Nagar, Amarpuri, Om Society	Ambar Agrawal	BJP
Zone 5	68	Dr. Khubchand Baghel Ward	Changorabhatha, Vasundhara Nagar, F.C.I. Colony, Shri Ram Nagar, Ayodhya Nagar, Matkorwa Para	Durga Yaadram Sahu	BJP
Zone 6	58	Shaheed Pankaj Vikram Ward	Dharam Nagar, Chhattisgarh Nagar, Sonjhar Para, Tagore Nagar, Vivekananda Nagar, Naraiya Talab, Police Line	Swapnil Mishra	BJP
Zone 6	59	Moreshwar Rao Garde Ward	Laxmi Nagar, Durga Para, Pragati Vihar, Santoshi Nagar, Prince Colony, Shiv Nagar, Taj Nagar	Anjali Golchha Jain	BJP
Zone 6	60	Chandrasekhar Azad Ward	Chaurasiya Colony, Manaspura, Simran City, Arjun Enclave, Bhairav Nagar, Bada Para Mathpuraina, B.S.U.P. Mathpuraina	Ramesh Sapaha	BJP
Zone 6	61	Shyama Prasad Mukherjee Ward	Bhathagaon Basti, Awadhpuri, Dhebar City, Rawatpura Nagar, Jyoti Nagar, Shiva Homes, Chandra Society, Hanuman Vatika	Ravi Sonkar (Chand)	BJP
Zone 6	62	Shaheed Rajiv Pandey Ward	Sanjay Nagar, Indira Nagar, Satnami Para, Umang Colony, Ravanbhatha Maidan, Filter Plant	Badri Prasad Gupta	BJP
Zone 6	63	Brigadier Usman Ward	Hamid Nagar, Tikrapara, Hardevlal Mandir, Dhimar Par, Sahu Para, Satbahaniya, Buddha Vihar, Chhoti R.D.A. Colony, Sudama	Pramod Kumar Sahu	BJP
Zone 7	22	Ishvari Charan Shukla Ward	Kukurbeda Basti, Dumartalab, Tiwari Colony, Madhura Nagar, Bengali Para, Kanchanganga Colony	Meena Thakur	BJP
Zone 7	23	Shaheed Manmohan Singh Bakshi Ward	Shivaji Nagar, Maruti Vihar, Siddheshwari Nagar, Dhimar Para, Krishna Nagar, Moti Nagar, Rishikesh Nagar, Saraswati Nagar, Suyash	Ronita Prakash Jagat	INC
Zone 7	24	Sardar Vallabh Bhai Patel Ward	Gokul Nagar, Laxman Nagar, Gopal Nagar, Sheetla Para, Rajiv Nagar	Deep Maniram Sahu	INC
Zone 7	25	Sant Ramdas Ward	Bharat Nagar, Krishna Nagar, Ram Nagar, F.C.I. Godown	Bhola Ram Sahu	BJP
Zone 7	37	Shaheed Chudamani Nayak Ward	Tatyapara, Mominpara, Handipara, Nemichand Gali, Ramsagar Para, Kewat Gali	Deepak Jaiswal	BJP
Zone 7	38	Swami Atmanand Ward	Samta Colony Part, Ramkund, Amapara, Bajrang Nagar	Anand Agrawal	BJP
Zone 7	39	Thakur Pyarelal Ward	Geeta Nagar, Choubey Colony, Samta Colony, Rakhi Nagar, Arjun Nagar	Suman Ashok Pandey	BJP
Zone 8	1	Veer Savarkar Nagar Ward	Hirapur, Atari, Jarway, Hirapur Housing Board Colony	Sandeep Sahu	INC
Zone 8	2	Pt. Jawaharlal Nehru Ward	Sondongri, Kabir Nagar, Ashiana, Balmiki Awas, Harshit Nagar, Patrakar Colony	Bhagatram Harvansh	BJP
Zone 8	19	Dr. APJ Abdul Kalam Ward	Chhota Ashok Nagar, Vikas Nagar, Pritam Nagar	Pritam Singh	BJP
Zone 8	20	Ramakrishna Paramahansha Ward	Bhawani Nagar, Teachers Colony, Shiv Vatika, Anuvrat Vihar, Housing Board Colony, Sainath Colony, Parmanand Nagar, Maruti Lifestyle	Aman Singh Thakur	BJP
Zone 8	21	Shaheed Bhagat Singh Ward	Housing Board Colony Tatibandh, Udaya Society, Rotary Nagar, Tatibandh Basti, Barsana	Gayatri Sunil Chandrakar	BJP
Zone 8	69	Madhavrao Sapre Ward	Satyam Vihar, Raypura Basti, Ram Chabutra Area, Vikas Vihar, Devanagari, Mahadev Ghat, Agroha Colony, Kushal Griha Nirman Colony	Mahendra Ausar	BJP
Zone 8	70	Sant Ravidas Ward	Sarona Basti, Bazar Para, Satnami Para, Sanjay Nagar, Chandanidih, Transport Nagar, Shriram Tower, AIIMS, Azad Nagar, Arihant Nagar, Rajiv Nagar	Arjun alias Arun Kumar Yadav	BJP
Zone 9	7	Kushabhau Thakre Ward	Housing Board Saddu, Saddu Basti, Daldal Seoni, Daya Nagar, Green Orchid, Ambuja City Center, Capital City Phase-1, 2	Khem Kumar Sen	BJP
Zone 9	8	Mahatma Gandhi Ward	Kachna, Kachna Housing Board, Rajdhani Vihar, Amaseoni, Satyam Nagar, Bhathapara, Nala Para, Bhawani Nagar, Anandam City, Chandi Nagar, V.I.P. Colony, Sapphire Green	Savitri Dhiwar	Independent
Zone 9	9	Motilal Nehru Ward	Dubey Colony, Ashoka Impression, Middle Vihar, Mowa, Kampa Basti, Anant Vihar Colony	Gopesh Kumar Sahu	BJP
Zone 9	31	Netaji Subhash Chandra Bose Ward	Khamhardih Basti, Shriram Nagar, Gayatri Nagar, Ganesh Ram Nagar, Parvati Nagar, Sales Tax Colony, Bhavna Nagar	Pushpa Rohit Sahu	BJP
Zone 10	56	Arvind Dixit Ward	Purana Rajendra Nagar, Chanchal Vihar, New Bharat Nagar, Sai Nagar, Navkar Hospital, Vidhayak Vishram Griha, Priyadarshini	Sachin B. Meghani	BJP

== Electoral history ==
The initial decades of RMC elections saw national parties like the Indian National Congress (INC) and the Bharatiya Janata Party (BJP) competing for control. The Congress, with its historical influence in central India, often dominated local elections during this period. Initially, citizens directly elected the mayor. This allowed the electorate to choose a leader they felt would best represent Raipur's interests till 1973 to 2015. Between 2015 and 2025, the system changed, and councilors elect the mayor. This aligns with the practice in many other municipal corporations across India but the direct election of mayor re-continued in 2025 elections.

The first elections for the 40 wards of the Raipur Municipal Corporation (RMC) were held in 1973, with Swaroop Chand Jain of the INC becoming the city's mayor. Between 1985 and 1995, the municipal corporation was administered by a district magistrate or administrator appointed by the Chief Minister of Madhya Pradesh, following a delimitation process. In 1995, the number of wards was increased to 60 by Digvijay Singh ministry, and elections were held, with Balbeer S. Juneja elected as the mayor.

Following the passing of the Madhya Pradesh Reorganisation Act, 2000, Raipur became part of the newly formed state of Chhattisgarh and was designated the largest municipal corporation in the state. Tarun Prasad Chatterjee was the first mayor of Raipur after Chhattisgarh's formation. In 2004, ahead of the local elections, the Raman Singh ministry approved the creation of seven additional wards, raising the total from 63 to 70. The first local body elections in the new state were held in 2004, where Sunil Kumar Soni of the BJP, who is currently the Member of Legislative Assembly for Raipur South, became the first non-Congress mayor of the city. By 2014, the RMC had created four more wards, leading to the current structure of 70 wards.

Elections for the Raipur Municipal Corporation were held in 2019–20, in which the INC emerged victorious, and Aijaz Dhebar became the mayor. However, due to the reservation and prolonged delimitation processes, local body elections were not conducted after the completion of the previous tenure, leading to the dissolution of the RMC. For the first time in 30 years, the collector was re-assigned as the administrator of RMC.

Elections for the Raipur Municipal Corporation were held in 2025, in which the BJP emerged victorious, and Meenal Choubey became the mayor.

=== 2025 ===
After a change in the state government, the system of direct mayoral elections was reintroduced by Sai ministry. The elections were delayed due to the implementation of delimitation and reservation processes. Instead of extending the term of the outgoing body, an administrator was appointed to oversee the corporation.

Gaurav K. Singh, an Indian Administrative Service officer serving as District Collector of Raipur, was appointed as the administrator (after MPPSC officer G P Mishra in 1995), becoming the first such appointee after the formation of Chhattisgarh. His tenure lasted approximately 40 days until the elections were conducted in February 2025.

The mayoral seat was reserved for women. Meenal Choubey of the Bharatiya Janata Party was elected Mayor, defeating Deepti Pramod Dubey by a huge margin. The BJP secured a decisive majority in the corporation, winning 60 wards, marking one of the largest victories in the corporation's history. The Congress was reduced to very poor representation. Sandeep Sahu initially served as Leader of the Opposition, and was later succeeded by Akash Tiwari.

2025 Raipur Municipal Corporation election
Party	Won	+/−
Bharatiya Janata Party	60	▲31
Indian National Congress	7	▼27
Independents	3	▼4
Total	70	

=== 2019–20 ===
Following a change in government in the state, the system of direct mayoral elections was discontinued by Baghel ministry, and the Mayor was once again elected indirectly by the councillors. The 2019–20 municipal elections were conducted using ballot voting, first since 2004 marking a departure from previous processes.

The Indian National Congress emerged as the largest party with 34 wards, while the BJP secured 29 wards and independent candidates won 7 wards. The Congress subsequently secured majority support within the council, leading to the election of Aijaz Dhebar as Mayor. Pramod Dubey was elected Chairman of the corporation. BJP's Suryakant Rathore and later Meenal Choubey served as Leader of the Opposition.

2019–20 Raipur Municipal Corporation election
Party	Won	+/−
Indian National Congress	34	▲10
Bharatiya Janata Party	29	▲1
Others & Independents	7	▼11
Total	70	

=== 2014–15 ===
The direct mayoral election system continued in the 2014–15 municipal elections. The mayoral seat was unreserved during this cycle. Pramod Dubey of the Indian National Congress was elected Mayor, defeating senior BJP leader Sachchidanand Upasane by a margin of approximately 35,000 votes.

In the council elections, the BJP remained the single largest party with 28 wards, followed by the Congress with 24 wards. Independent candidates performed strongly, winning 18 wards and playing a significant role in the composition of the corporation. Both major parties recorded a decline in their ward tallies compared to the previous election.

2014–15 Raipur Municipal Corporation election
Party	Won	+/−
Bharatiya Janata Party	28	▼7
Indian National Congress	24	▼2
Others & Independents	18	▲9
Total	70	

=== 2009–10 ===
Ahead of the scheduled municipal elections, the state government introduced a system for the direct election of the Mayor by the public. As a result, the elections due in December 2008 were deferred, and the term of the municipal body was extended by one year through legislative action.

The electoral process was completed by November 2009, and the mayoral seat was reserved for a Scheduled Tribe woman. Under the direct election system, Kiranmayi Nayak of the Indian National Congress was elected Mayor, becoming the first woman to hold the office in Raipur. In the council, the BJP emerged as the single largest party with 35 wards, while the Congress secured 26 wards.

2009–10 Raipur Municipal Corporation election
Party	Won	+/−
Bharatiya Janata Party	35	
Indian National Congress	26	
Others & Independents	9	
Total	70	

=== 2004–05 ===
The first municipal elections of the Raipur Municipal Corporation following the formation of the state of Chhattisgarh were held in December 2004, with results declared in January 2005. Due to limited availability of archival records, detailed ward-wise results are not widely documented. However, the Bharatiya Janata Party secured a majority across the 70 wards. Subsequently, Sunil Soni was elected Mayor by the elected councillors, becoming the first non-Congress Mayor of the city.

=== List of mayors ===
S. No.	Name	Term start	Term end	Duration	Party
1	Swaroop Chand Jain	27 February 1980	27 February 1981	1 year, 0 days	Indian National Congress
2	S.R. Murthi	27 February 1981	27 February 1982	1 year, 0 days	Indian National Congress
(1)	Swaroop Chand Jain	27 February 1982	27 February 1983	1 year, 0 days	Indian National Congress
3	Tarun Prasad Chatterjee	27 February 1983	10 September 1984	1 year, 196 days	Indian National Congress
4	Santosh Agarwal	11 September 1984	26 February 1985	168 days	Indian National Congress
–	Omkar Prasad Dubey	27 February 1985	26 February 1987	9 years, 311 days	Administrator (Note: Chhattisgarh was carved out of Madhya Pradesh in the year 2003) (Government of Madhya Pradesh)
–	Ajay Nath	27 February 1987	26 February 1988	9 years, 311 days	Administrator (Government of Madhya Pradesh)
–	Bajrang Sahay	27 February 1988	26 February 1989	9 years, 311 days	Administrator (Government of Madhya Pradesh)
–	Mohan Rao	27 February 1989	4 June 1989	9 years, 311 days	Administrator (Government of Madhya Pradesh)
–	B. S. Shrivastava	5 June 1989	4 January 1990	9 years, 311 days	Administrator (Government of Madhya Pradesh)
–	Manoj Shrivastava	5 January 1990	4 January 1993	9 years, 311 days	Administrator (Government of Madhya Pradesh)
–	G. S. Mishra	5 January 1993	4 January 1995	9 years, 311 days	Administrator (Government of Madhya Pradesh)
5	Balbir Juneja	5 January 1995	4 January 2000	4 years, 364 days	Indian National Congress
(3)	Tarun Prasad Chatterjee	5 January 2000	25 December 2003	3 years, 354 days	Indian National Congress
6	Sunil Kumar Soni	5 January 2004	5 January 2010	6 years, 0 days	Bharatiya Janata Party
7	Kiranmayi Nayak	5 January 2010	7 January 2015	5 years, 2 days	Indian National Congress
8	Pramod Dubey	7 January 2015	7 January 2020	5 years, 0 days	Indian National Congress
9	Aijaz Dhebar	7 January 2020	6 January 2025	4 years, 365 days	Indian National Congress
–	Dr. Gaurav K. Singh	7 January 2025	15 February 2025	39 days	Administrator (Government of Chhattisgarh)
10	Meenal Choubey	15 February 2025	Incumbent	1 year, 216 days	Bharatiya Janata Party
