= Chhattisgarh Vikas Party =

Chhattisgarh Vikas Party was an extremely short-lived group of twelve MLAs who had defected from the Bhartiya Janata Party and announced the grouping's name with the suffix 'Party' in order to circumvent the anti-defection law and merged into the Congress Party the next day.
