= Raipur =

- Metropolis
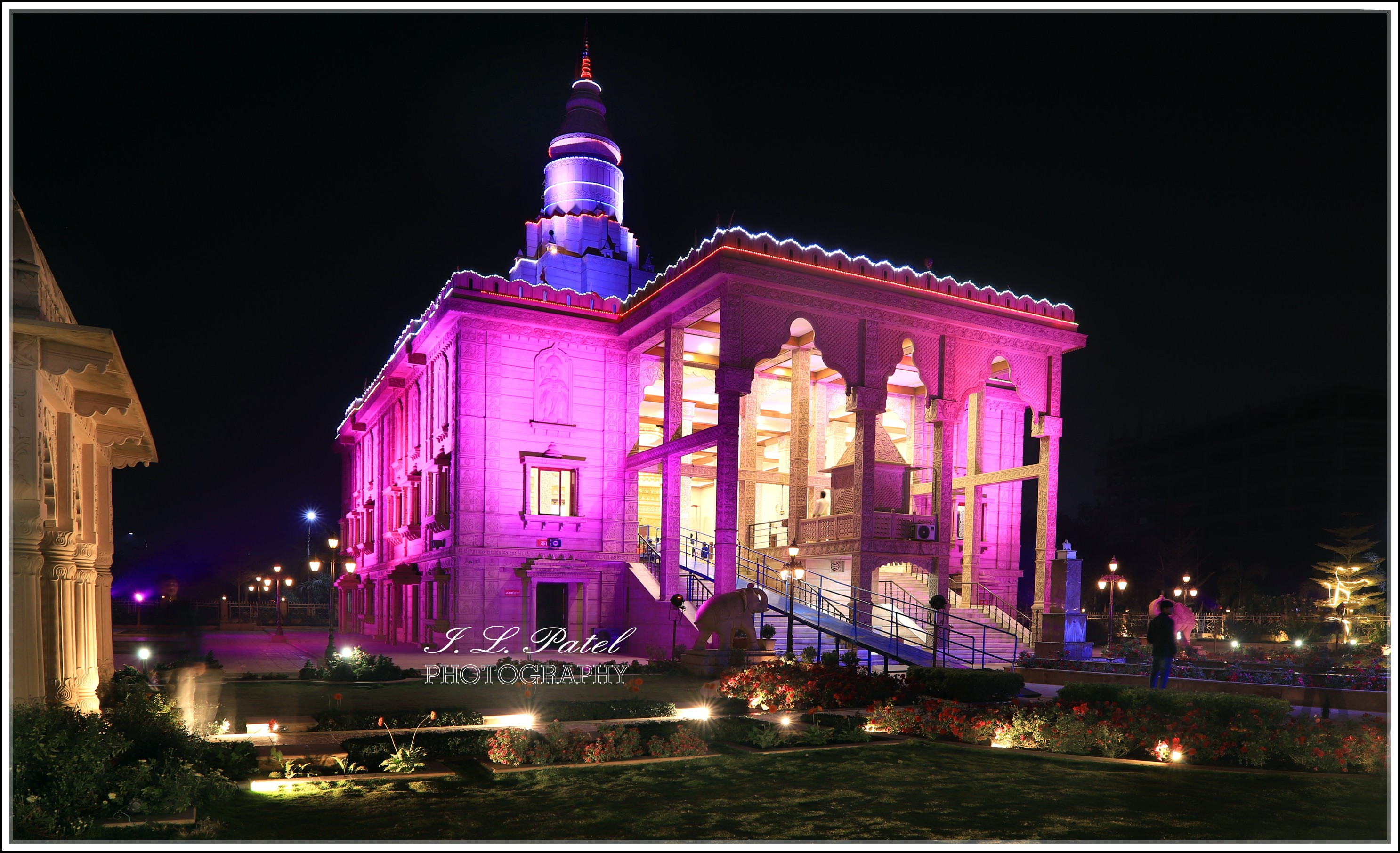
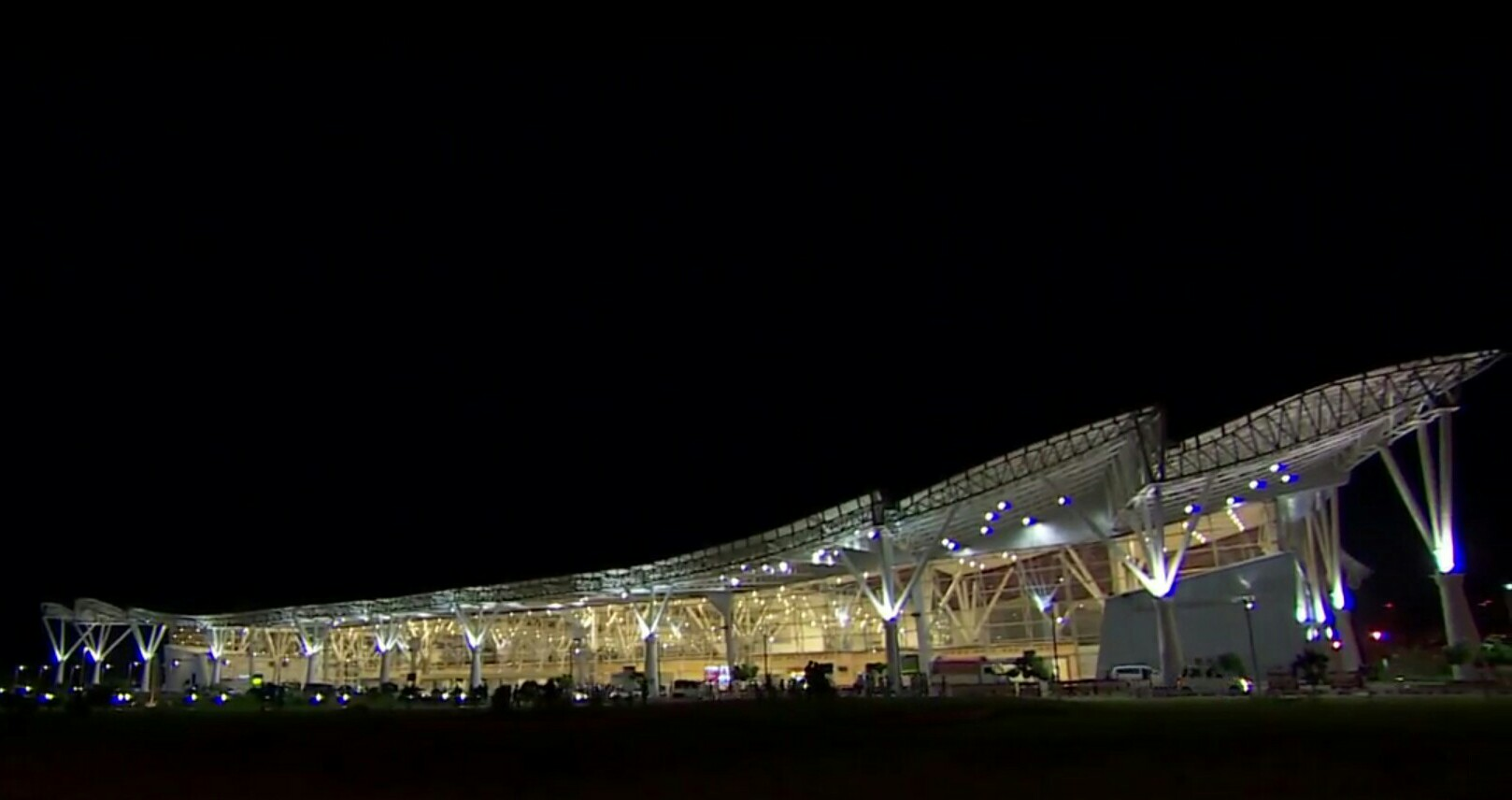
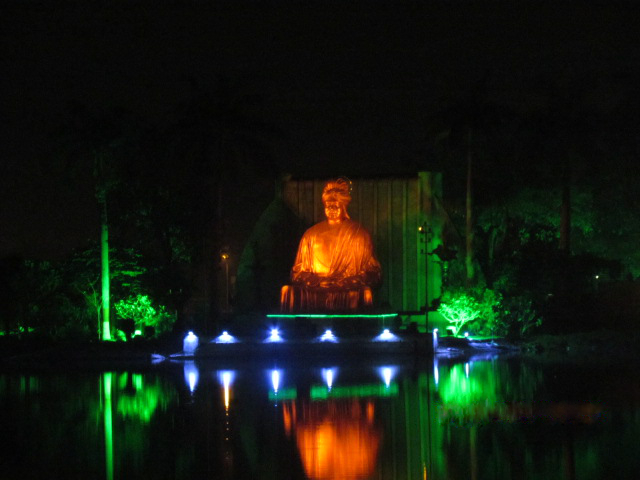
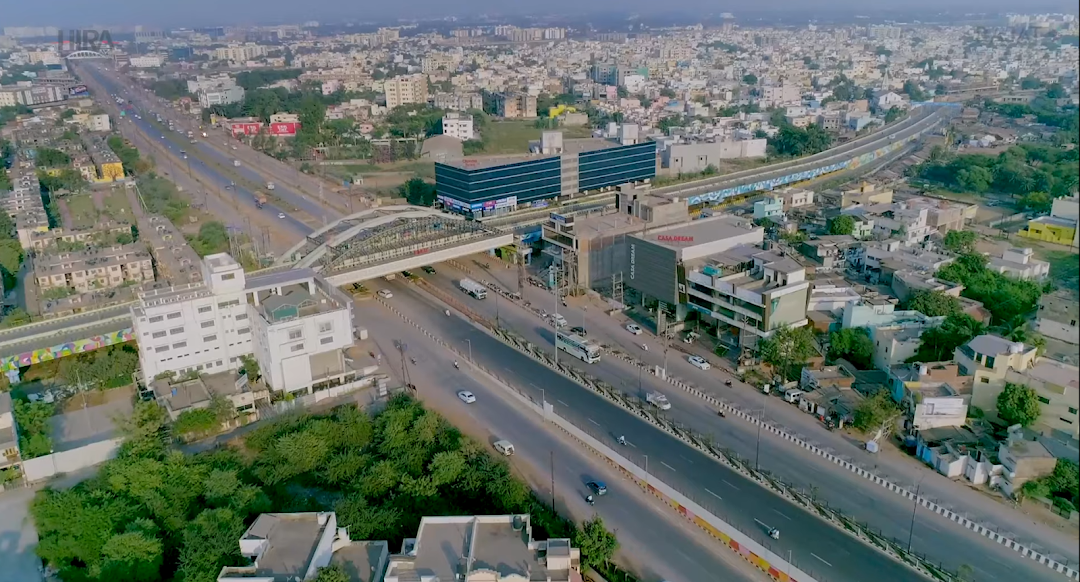
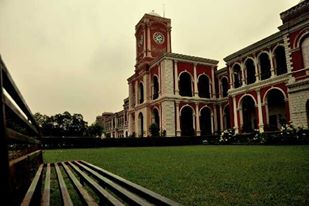
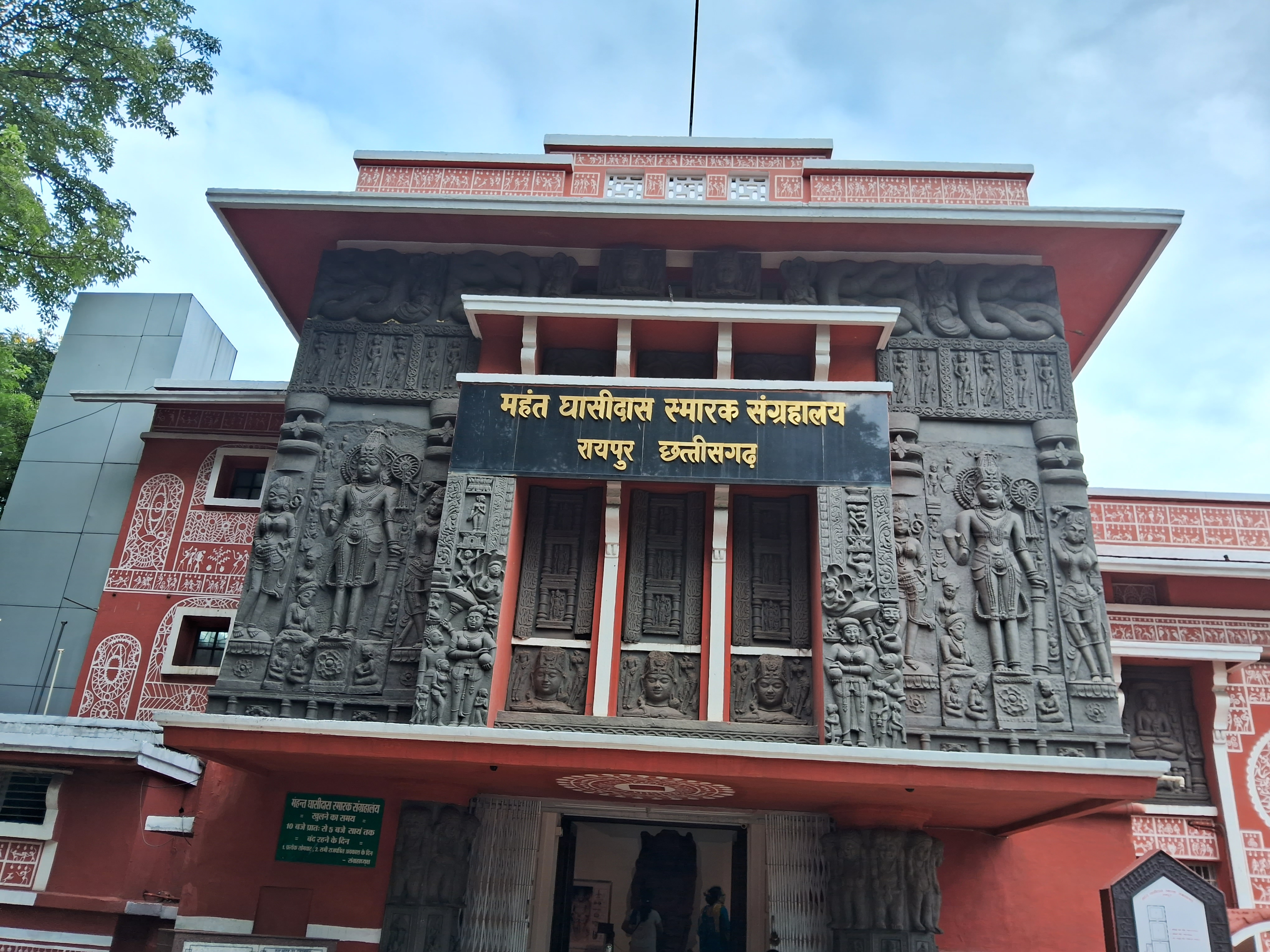
- Ram Mandir Swami Vivekananda Airport Sri Vivekananda Sarovar (Budha Talab) Mumbai Kolkata Highway Rajkumar College, Raipur Mahant Ghasidas Memorial Museum, Raipur
- Interactive map of Raipur
- Location within Chhattisgarh Location within India
- Coordinates: 21°14′40″N 81°37′50″E
- Country: India
- State: Chhattisgarh
- District: Raipur
- Founder: Brahma Deo Rai
- Named for: Brahma Deo Rai

Government
  - Type: Municipal Corporation
  - Body: Raipur Municipal Corporation (RMC) Raipur Development Authority (RDA) Naya Raipur Development Authority (NRDA)
  - Mayor: Meenal Choubey, BJP
  - District Magistrate & Administrator: Gaurav Kumar Singh (IAS)
  - Superintendent of Police: Lal Umaid Singh (IPS)
  - Member of Parliament: Brijmohan Agrawal, BJP
  - Member of Legislative Assembly: List: Purandar Mishra, BJP (Raipur North) Sunil Kumar Soni, BJP (Raipur South) Rajesh Munat, BJP (Raipur West) Motilal Sahu, BJP (Raipur Rural) Anuj Sharma, BJP (Dharsiwa)

Area
  - Metropolis: 503.67 km^{2} (194.47 sq mi)
- Elevation: 298.15 m (978.2 ft)

Population (2011)
  - Metropolis: 1,010,087
  - Estimate (2026): 1,519,000
  - Rank: India: 45th Chhattisgarh: 1st
  - Density: 2,005.5/km^{2} (5,194.1/sq mi)
  - Metro: 1,690,000 (estimate)
  - Metro rank: 44th
- Demonym(s): Raipurians, Raipurya
- Time zone: UTC+5:30 (IST)
- PIN: 492001-22, 493111-211 (Raipur)
- Telephone code: 0771
- Vehicle registration: CG-04
- UN/LOCODE: IN RPR
- Website: raipur.gov.in

Raipur (Hindi: rāypura, pronounced [ɾaːɪpʊɾᵊ]) is the capital city of the Indian state of Chhattisgarh. Raipur is also the administrative headquarters of Raipur district and Raipur division, and the most populous city of the state. It was a part of Madhya Pradesh before the state of Chhattisgarh was formed on 1 November 2000. It is a major commercial hub for trade and commerce in the region. It has exponential industrial growth and has become a major business hub in Central India. It has been ranked as India's 6th cleanest city as per the Swachh Survekshan for the year 2021. (In the Swachh Survekshan Awards-2023, Chhattisgarh secured the third rank in the ‘Best Performing States’ category). Raipur is ranked 7th in India's Ease of Living Index 2022 and 7th in the Municipal Performance Index 2020, both by the Ministry of Housing and Urban Affairs.

It is among the biggest producers of steel and iron in the country. There are about 200 steel rolling mills, 195 sponge iron plants, at least 6 steel plants, 60 plywood factories, 35 ferro-alloy plants, and 500 agro industries in the city. In addition, Raipur also has over 800 rice milling plants.

== History ==
Raipur district, like the rest of the Chhattisgarh plain, was once known as Dakshina Kosala and considered to be under Maurya Empire. In Arang near Raipur, a Gupta inscription dated to the 6th century CE shows Gupta hegemony over the region. In the 7th century CE, the region was ruled by a Buddhist kingdom in Bhandak in modern-day Maharashtra and was described by Xuanzang. A branch of this family later migrated to Sirpur in present-day Mahasamund district, and later took control of the entirety of Dakshina Kosala. This kingdom's prosperity reached its height with Tivaradeva. His son inscribed almost all temples in Sirpur. They were later ousted by the Sharabpuriyas, who took control of the rest of Chhattisgarh and ruled for several centuries.

By the early 9th century the Kalachuris gained control of the region. The Kalachuris of Ratnapura ruled Ratnapur until the 13th century. By the 14th century, the Kalachuris of Raipur branch gained power. One king of the Raipur branch conquered 18 garh, or forts, of the enemy - lending an etymology to Chhattisgarh, the 36 forts. By the 18th century Kalachuris became the overlords of entire Chhattisgarh region.

== Demographics ==
Historical population
Year	Pop.	±%
1901	32,114	—
1911	35,335	+10.0%
1921	38,341	+8.5%
1931	45,390	+18.4%
1941	63,465	+39.8%
1951	89,804	+41.5%
1961	139,792	+55.7%
1971	205,986	+47.4%
1981	338,245	+64.2%
1991	452,301	+33.7%
2001	707,469	+56.4%
2011	1,010,433	+42.8%

As of the 2011 census, Raipur Municipal Corporation had a population of 1,010,433, of which 519,286 are males and 490,801 are females—a sex ratio of 945 females per 1000 males, higher than the national average of 940 per 1000. 124,471 children are in the age group of 0–6 years, of which 64,522 are boys and 59,949 are girls—a ratio of 929 girls per 1000 boys. There are 769,593 literates (420,155 males, 349,438 females). The effective literacy was 86.90%; male literacy was 92.39% and female literacy was 81.10%, significantly higher than the national average of 73.00%.

The urban agglomeration had a population of 1,122,555, of which males constitute 578,339, females constitute 544,216—a sex ratio of 941 females per 1000 males and 142,826 children are in the age group of 0–6 years. There are a total of 846,952 literates with an effective literacy rate of 86.45%.

== Geography and climate ==
Raipur

Climate chart (precipitation, max. and min. temperature)
J	F	M	A	M	J	J	A	S	O	N	D
6.7 28 13	12 31 17	25 36 21	16 40 25	19 42 28	190 37 27	381 31 24	345 30 24	230 31 24	54 32 22	7.4 30 17	3.7 27 13
- █ Average max. and min. temperatures in °C
- █ Precipitation totals in mm
- Source: IMD
Imperial conversion
J	F	M	A	M	J	J	A	S	O	N	D
0.3 82 56	0.5 88 62	1 96 69	0.6 103 78	0.7 108 83	7.5 99 80	15 87 75	14 86 75	9.1 88 75	2.1 89 71	0.3 85 62	0.1 81 56
- █ Average max. and min. temperatures in °F
- █ Precipitation totals in inches

=== Geography ===
Raipur is located near the centre of a large plain, sometimes referred to as the "rice bowl of India", where hundreds of varieties of rice are grown. The Mahanadi River flows to the east of the city of Raipur, and the southern side has dense forests. The Maikal Hills rise on the north-west of Raipur; on the north, the land rises and merges with the Chota Nagpur Plateau, which extends north-east across Jharkhand state. On the south of Raipur lies the Deccan Plateau.

=== Climate ===
Raipur has a tropical wet and dry climate that corresponds to the Köppen climate classification category Aw, and temperatures remain moderate throughout the year, except from March to June, which can be extremely hot. The temperature in April–May sometimes rises above 48 °C (118 °F). These summer months also have dry and hot winds. The city receives about 1,300 millimetres (51 in) of rain, mostly in the monsoon season from mid June to early October. Winters last from November to February and are mild, although lows can fall to 5 °C (41 °F) making it reasonably cold.

Climate data for Raipur (1991–2020, extremes 1901–present)
Month	Jan	Feb	Mar	Apr	May	Jun	Jul	Aug	Sep	Oct	Nov	Dec	Year
Record high °C (°F)	36.5 (97.7)	38.0 (100.4)	43.3 (109.9)	46.1 (115.0)	47.9 (118.2)	47.2 (117.0)	41.2 (106.2)	37.5 (99.5)	37.2 (99.0)	37.9 (100.2)	35.6 (96.1)	34.1 (93.4)	47.9 (118.2)
Mean daily maximum °C (°F)	28.0 (82.4)	31.1 (88.0)	35.2 (95.4)	39.5 (103.1)	41.8 (107.2)	37.1 (98.8)	31.3 (88.3)	30.4 (86.7)	31.6 (88.9)	31.9 (89.4)	30.4 (86.7)	28.5 (83.3)	33.0 (91.4)
Daily mean °C (°F)	20.8 (69.4)	23.8 (74.8)	26.5 (79.7)	32.1 (89.8)	35.1 (95.2)	32.0 (89.6)	27.8 (82.0)	27.2 (81.0)	27.9 (82.2)	26.9 (80.4)	23.7 (74.7)	21.0 (69.8)	27.1 (80.7)
Mean daily minimum °C (°F)	13.9 (57.0)	16.9 (62.4)	20.9 (69.6)	24.8 (76.6)	27.8 (82.0)	26.7 (80.1)	24.6 (76.3)	24.5 (76.1)	24.4 (75.9)	22.0 (71.6)	17.4 (63.3)	13.8 (56.8)	21.5 (70.7)
Record low °C (°F)	5.0 (41.0)	5.0 (41.0)	8.3 (46.9)	15.0 (59.0)	14.4 (57.9)	16.1 (61.0)	17.1 (62.8)	20.0 (68.0)	18.3 (64.9)	13.9 (57.0)	8.3 (46.9)	3.9 (39.0)	3.9 (39.0)
Average rainfall mm (inches)	14.4 (0.57)	16.3 (0.64)	13.2 (0.52)	15.7 (0.62)	23.8 (0.94)	197.8 (7.79)	377.4 (14.86)	334.2 (13.16)	235.5 (9.27)	46.9 (1.85)	8.2 (0.32)	6.9 (0.27)	1,290.3 (50.80)
Average rainy days	1.2	1.2	1.5	1.7	1.9	9.1	14.4	14.4	9.6	2.8	0.5	0.3	58.6
Average relative humidity (%) (at 17:30 IST)	43	35	29	24	26	52	76	79	74	62	53	47	50
Source 1: India Meteorological Department
Source 2: Tokyo Climate Center (mean temperatures 1991–2020)

Climate data for Raipur (Swami Vivekananda Airport) 1991-2020
Month	Jan	Feb	Mar	Apr	May	Jun	Jul	Aug	Sep	Oct	Nov	Dec	Year
Record high °C (°F)	35.7 (96.3)	38.7 (101.7)	42.4 (108.3)	45.4 (113.7)	47.4 (117.3)	47.2 (117.0)	41.5 (106.7)	37.2 (99.0)	39.9 (103.8)	36.8 (98.2)	35.5 (95.9)	33.0 (91.4)	47.4 (117.3)
Mean daily maximum °C (°F)	28.0 (82.4)	31.1 (88.0)	35.7 (96.3)	39.6 (103.3)	41.9 (107.4)	37.0 (98.6)	31.4 (88.5)	30.3 (86.5)	31.5 (88.7)	31.9 (89.4)	30.4 (86.7)	28.3 (82.9)	33.1 (91.6)
Mean daily minimum °C (°F)	13.3 (55.9)	16.3 (61.3)	20.6 (69.1)	24.5 (76.1)	27.6 (81.7)	26.2 (79.2)	24.5 (76.1)	24.2 (75.6)	24.0 (75.2)	21.5 (70.7)	17.0 (62.6)	13.3 (55.9)	21.0 (69.8)
Record low °C (°F)	5.7 (42.3)	8.4 (47.1)	12.4 (54.3)	16.5 (61.7)	19.2 (66.6)	19.5 (67.1)	20.0 (68.0)	20.2 (68.4)	19.8 (67.6)	12.2 (54.0)	9.9 (49.8)	7.1 (44.8)	5.7 (42.3)
Average rainfall mm (inches)	14.1 (0.56)	16.2 (0.64)	15.0 (0.59)	18.9 (0.74)	23.4 (0.92)	200.3 (7.89)	362.8 (14.28)	336.3 (13.24)	194.7 (7.67)	53.8 (2.12)	8.7 (0.34)	4.6 (0.18)	1,248.8 (49.17)
Average rainy days	1.1	1.3	1.4	1.6	2.2	8.8	14.8	15.3	9.2	3.2	0.5	0.4	59.7
Average relative humidity (%) (at 17:30 IST)	39	31	24	21	23	51	74	79	73	60	49	41	47
Source: India Meteorological Department

Raipur has been ranked the eighth-best National Clean Air City (under Category I: Cities with population above 10 Lakhs) in India according to the Swachh Vayu Survekshan 2024 Results.

== Government and politics ==
=== Civic administration ===
Raipur city has a Municipal corporation. It was initially established by the British on 17 May 1867, initially named Raipur Municipal Committee. It was upgraded to Raipur Municipal Corporation in the year 1973. The area of the municipal corporation is 503.67 km^{2} (194.47 sq mi). RMC is governed under the guidelines mentioned in the Chhattisgarh Municipalities Act, 1961. As per the 2011 Census of India, the urban agglomeration population in Raipur, Durg - Bhilai was 3,186,632. The three urban cities of Raipur, Bhilai, and Durg in the west-central region of Chhattisgarh together create the Raipur - Bhilai - Durg Tri-City Metro area.

The functions of the municipal corporation are the construction of health centres, educational institutes, and schools, and the periodic maintenance of the houses. In addition to taking the responsibility of constructing basic civic infrastructure, flyovers, and roads, it is also developing recreational centres such as museums, community halls, and parks. Along with basic civic infrastructure, flyovers, and roads.

The executive committee consists of the Commissioner, Deputy commissioner, city health officers, executive engineers, zone commissioners, and other staff. The Municipal Commissioner of Raipur is Vishwa Deep (I.A.S). The current mayor is Meenal Choubey from BJP. The Mayor in the council consists of the Mayor who is the ex officio chairperson of the MIC. Among elected councillors, the mayor elects them to the council. There are 70 wards and 8 zones within the Raipur Municipal Corporation. The zonal ward committees are headed by chairpersons who are elected by ward councillors of the respective zone.

The recent municipal elections were held on 11 February 2025. The political parties in the majority at the municipal level are BJP and INC. The estimated municipal budget for the 2017-2018 period is ₹ 2,612,667. Key revenue sources are tax income, fees and charges, sanitation charges, grants and donations, and capital income.

The city is a part of Raipur District with Gaurav Kumar Singh, IAS/Collector and DM. The collector heads the district administration department. The upper collector, deputy collector, and joint deputy assist the Collector. Another governing agency that is active in the city of Raipur is the Urban Administration And Development, Chhattisgarh.

=== Municipal finance ===
According to financial data published on the CityFinance Portal of the Ministry of Housing and Urban Affairs, the Raipur Municipal Corporation reported total revenue receipts of ₹528 crore (US$64 million) and total expenditure of ₹460 crore (US$55 million) in 2022–23. Tax revenue accounted for about 27.7% of the total revenue, while the corporation received ₹110 crore in grants during the financial year.

=== Master plan ===
Raipur Master Plan 2021 recognizes the need for planned development to take the pressure off the downtown core and meet the need for green spaces and bodies of water in that area. The plan calls for dense housing in new subdivisions on the outskirts and well-planned high-rise commercial and industrial development along with the NH-6 as well as on the north side of the city.

=== Legislative assembly and state agencies ===
Raipur is a Lok Sabha/Parliamentary constituency in central Chhattisgarh. Raipur's Lok Sabha seat is unreserved. Brijmohan Agrawal of BJP is the current Member of Parliament, Lok Sabha from the city. There are seven Vidhan Sabha seats in Raipur district, including three in Raipur City, one in Raipur Rural and three in Outer Tehsils.

== Economy ==
Raipur, being the capital city of Chhattisgarh, has attracted large amounts of industrial development. As it is the state capital, the government and service sectors make up a large part of the city's economy and workforce. Manufacturing industries are also well-developed in the city, with a large number of industrial zones. Raipur is also regarded as one of the best cities to do business. It is abundantly rich in mineral resources and is among the biggest producers of steel and iron in the country. There are about 200 steel rolling mills, 195 sponge iron plants, at least 6 steel plants, 60 plywood factories, 35 ferro-alloy plants, and 500 agro-industries in the city. In addition, Raipur also has over 800 rice milling plants.

Dalmia Cement (Bharat) is planning to set up an integrated cement manufacturing unit with a capacity of 2.5 million TPA in Raipur. A South Korean multinational Sung Ha Telecom is also planning to set up a plant in Naya Raipur. JSW Steel has a steel plant in Raipur. APL Apollo's in joint venture with a Singaporean company has planned a manufacturing plant in Raipur. Grasim Industries operates a cement plant at Rawan in Raipur. Ambuja Cements has a plant in Bhatapara. In addition, Raipur has a large chemical plant which produces and supplies formalin all throughout the country. LPG bottling plants owned by Bharat Petroleum and Hindustan Petroleum are also in Raipur. Godavari - E - Mobility is planning to set up a manufacturing plant in the city as well. A heavy machinery plant of Jindal Group is in Raipur.

Functioning as an information technology (IT) and cyber hub, a technology park in Chhattisgarh's new capital city Naya Raipur was built. Chhattisgarh State Industrial Development Corporation (CSIDC) will be developing a new industrial area in Tilda near Raipur to provide facilities for small and medium industries. Two new industrial parks for apparel and metal industries are coming up in Raipur.

== Civic utilities ==
=== Transport services ===
The superintendent of Engineers Executive Engineers, the team of Engineers, and the staff responsible for the related activities of the road department head the public works department. Their purposes are planning and designing of road stormwater drains, maintenance of roads and streets, maintenance of gardens and parks, resurfacing the roads, and repairing potholes and bad patches.

In the bus transport system of Raipur City there is a total number of 157 buses plying within the city.

=== Fire service and electricity ===
The city's electricity is supplied by Chhattisgarh State Power Distribution Company Limited. Fire and emergency services were set up in 2016 to protect fire incidents in the state. As per the directions of the government, the Fire Station of the urban body are being taken under fire and emergency services.

=== Water, drainage, and sewerage ===
The existing source of unfiltered water is the Kharun River, and about 170 million litres of water per day (MLD) is treated on a daily basis, and the plant has a treatment capacity of 275 MLD. The per capita water supply in the city of Raipur is 135 litres per day. There is a water supply connection serving a total of 50,000 households. Along with water from the Kharun River (27 MLD), another source of water is groundwater, and the capacity utilized is 22 MLD. There is a total of 1,133 handpumps in the city.

There is a lack in the sewerage systems of Raipur City. The data for households with a Sewerage Network is unavailable, but the number of households with septic tanks is 1,44,882 and the households without any outlets for toilets is 5,649. The city has no separate drainage system nor any sewer lines. There is a separate stormwater drainage system, laid as per requirement.

=== Solid waste management ===
The waste management in the city is entrusted to the city health officer, the in-charge health officer, zonal health officer, and the team of sanitary supervisors and ward supervisors. A total of 3,56,490 households have been successful with source segregation and are covered by door-to-door collection. Raipur's major waste disposal site is the Sarona site, which is 12 km away from the city centre.

== Transport ==
=== Roadways ===
Some major roads in Raipur are National Highway 53 (NH-53), National Highway 30 (NH-30), Great Eastern Road, Pandri Road, Baloda Bazar Road, Nardha Raipur Road, VIP Road, and Atal Path Expressway.

The Raipur–Naya Raipur Expressway, also known as Atal Path Expressway, is a 12.7 km (7.9 mi) access-controlled expressway connecting Raipur to Naya Raipur. It has been made to ease the traffic on the GE road and provide faster access to Dhamtari road from Raipur railway station. It serves 4 flyovers and 1 elevated corridor, crossing over GE road and NH-53 in between two ends of the expressway.

The proposed Durg–Raipur–Arang Expressway, Raipur-Ranchi-Dhanbad Expressway and the under-construction Raipur–Visakhapatnam Expressway will pass through and start from Raipur, which after completion, will enhance connectivity and commute further with other cities to and from Raipur.

=== Bus transport ===
The Sri Balaji Swami Trust Sri Dudhadhari Math Inter State Bus Terminal at Ravanbhantha is the main bus station of the city. It has replaced the old Minimata Bus Stand or Pandri Stand, which was causing heavy traffic problems. The services of the new ISBT started on 15 November 2021. The only bus rapid transit system is the Raipur and Naya Raipur BRTS.

=== Metro ===
A light rail, or a Metrolite or Lite Metro (as referred in India), has been proposed by the Government of Chhattisgarh, which will run from Naya Raipur to Durg via Raipur and Bhilai.

=== Railways ===
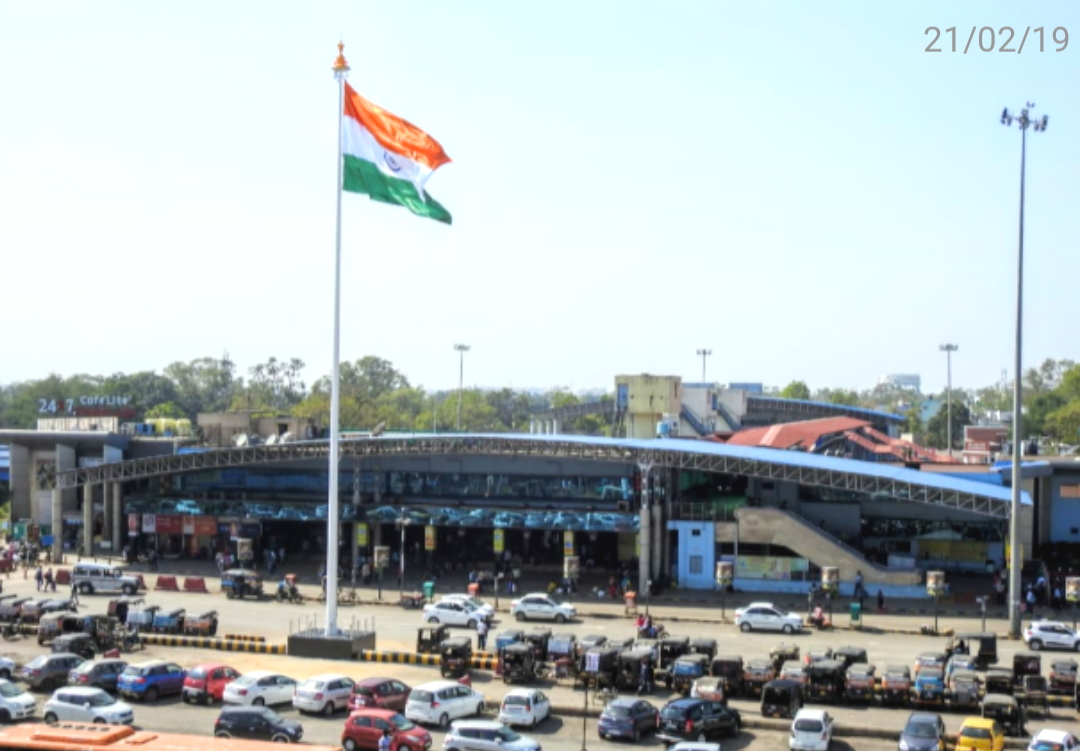
Main side of Railway station

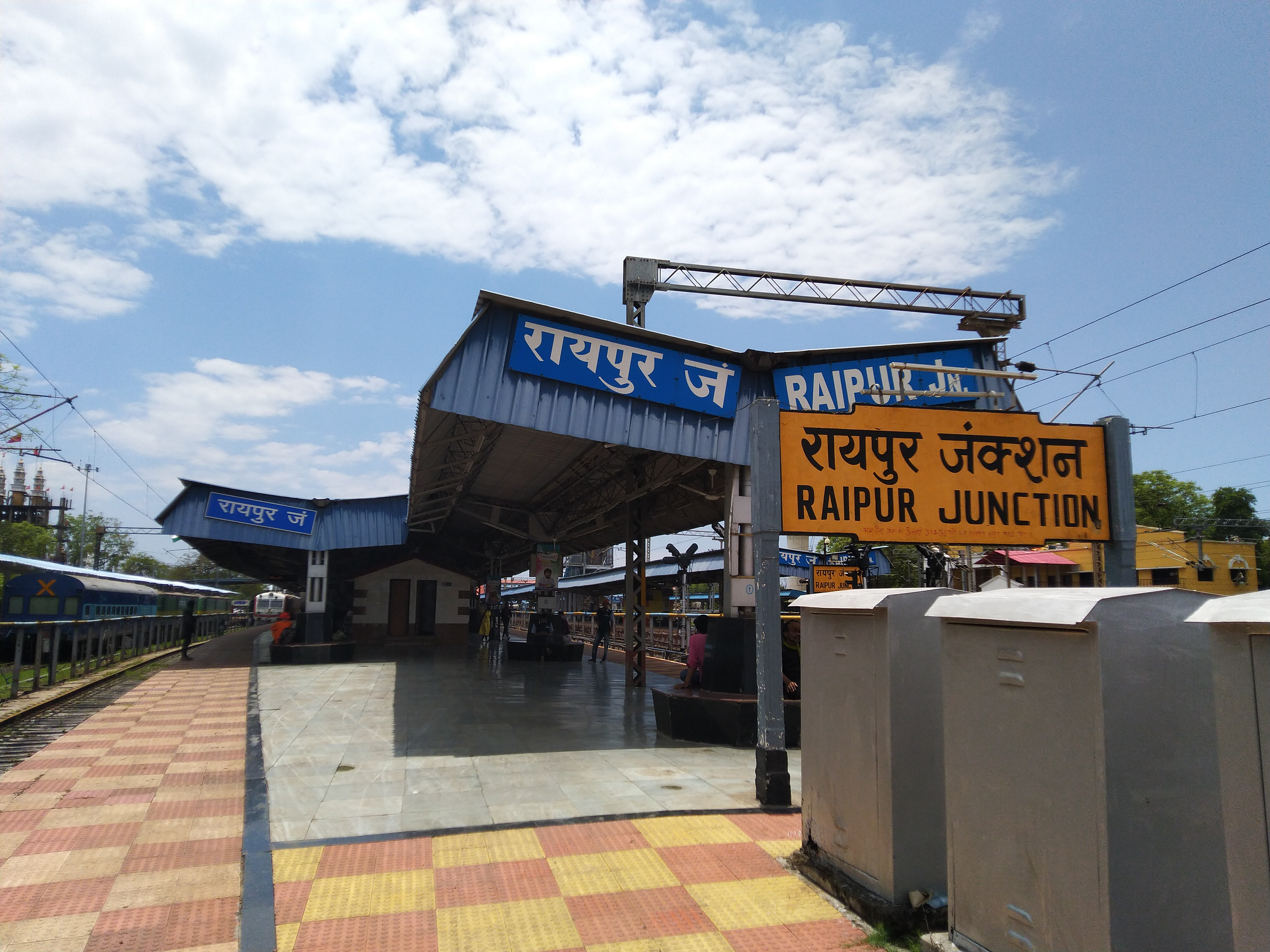
Raipur Junction Railway Station

Raipur Junction railway station is the primary railway station of the city, which is situated on the Howrah-Nagpur-Mumbai line of the Indian Railways, running through the cities of Bhusawal, Nagpur, Gondia, Durg (Bhilai), Bilaspur, Rourkela and Kharagpur. Thus, it is connected with many major cities. It is categorized in the A-1 category of railway stations by the Indian Railways. Raipur has some smaller railway stations in Sarona, Saraswati Nagar, and the WRS Colony railway stations which also lie on the same railway route.

=== Airport ===
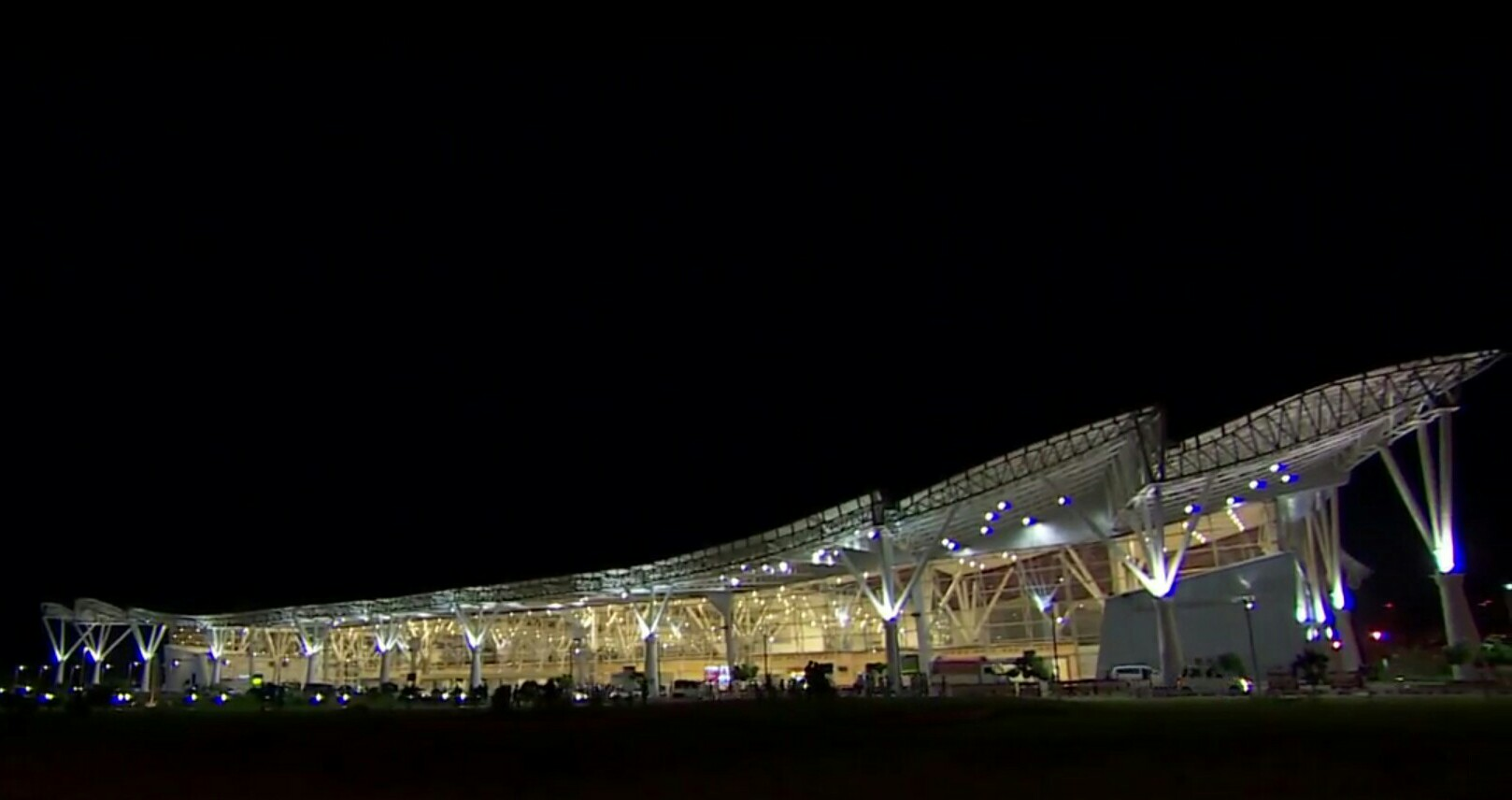
Swami Vivekananda Airport, Raipur

Swami Vivekananda International Airport, (Formerly called the Mana Airport), is the primary airport serving the state of Chhattisgarh. The airport is located 15 km (9.3 mi) south of Raipur and 10 km (6.2 mi) from Naya Raipur. The airport is well-connected, having daily direct flights to Mumbai, Delhi, Kolkata, Bangalore, Pune, Chennai, Goa, Lucknow, Indore, Jaipur, Patna, Ahmedabad, Bhopal, Bhubaneswar, Hyderabad, Prayagraj, and Jagdalpur, operated by Alliance Air, IndiGo and Vistara airlines.

== List of mayors ==
S. No.	Name	Term start	Term end	Duration	Party
1	Swaroop Chand Jain	27 February 1980	27 February 1981	1 year, 0 days	Indian National Congress
2	S.R. Murthi	27 February 1981	27 February 1982	1 year, 0 days	Indian National Congress
(1)	Swaroop Chand Jain	27 February 1982	27 February 1983	1 year, 0 days	Indian National Congress
3	Tarun Prasad Chatterjee	27 February 1983	10 September 1984	1 year, 196 days	Indian National Congress
4	Santosh Agarwal	11 September 1984	26 February 1985	168 days	Indian National Congress
–	Omkar Prasad Dubey	27 February 1985	26 February 1987	9 years, 311 days	Administrator (Note: Chhattisgarh was carved out of Madhya Pradesh in the year 2003) (Government of Madhya Pradesh)
–	Ajay Nath	27 February 1987	26 February 1988	9 years, 311 days	Administrator (Government of Madhya Pradesh)
–	Bajrang Sahay	27 February 1988	26 February 1989	9 years, 311 days	Administrator (Government of Madhya Pradesh)
–	Mohan Rao	27 February 1989	4 June 1989	9 years, 311 days	Administrator (Government of Madhya Pradesh)
–	B. S. Shrivastava	5 June 1989	4 January 1990	9 years, 311 days	Administrator (Government of Madhya Pradesh)
–	Manoj Shrivastava	5 January 1990	4 January 1993	9 years, 311 days	Administrator (Government of Madhya Pradesh)
–	G. S. Mishra	5 January 1993	4 January 1995	9 years, 311 days	Administrator (Government of Madhya Pradesh)
5	Balbir Juneja	5 January 1995	4 January 2000	4 years, 364 days	Indian National Congress
(3)	Tarun Prasad Chatterjee	5 January 2000	25 December 2003	3 years, 354 days	Indian National Congress
6	Sunil Kumar Soni	5 January 2004	5 January 2010	6 years, 0 days	Bharatiya Janata Party
7	Kiranmayi Nayak	5 January 2010	7 January 2015	5 years, 2 days	Indian National Congress
8	Pramod Dubey	7 January 2015	7 January 2020	5 years, 0 days	Indian National Congress
9	Aijaz Dhebar	7 January 2020	6 January 2025	4 years, 365 days	Indian National Congress
–	Dr. Gaurav K. Singh	7 January 2025	15 February 2025	39 days	Administrator (Government of Chhattisgarh)
10	Meenal Choubey	15 February 2025	Incumbent	1 year, 238 days	Bharatiya Janata Party

== Points of interest ==
Raipur
- Mata Kaushalya Temple is the only temple in the world dedicated to the deity Mata Kaushalya.
- Purkhouti Muktangan, Naya Raipur an open-air Cultural garden that exhibits the Culture of Chhattisgarh.
- Nandanvan Jungle Safari, Naya Raipur is Asia's largest man-made Jungle Safari.
- The Shree Ram temple, VIP square.
- The Mahant Ghasidas Memorial Museum, Ghadi chowk.
- Swami Vivekananda Sarowar (Budha Talab).
- Telibandha Lake (Marine Drive).

== Education ==
Raipur has become a big educational hub of Chhattisgarh due to the presence of many institutes of national importance in engineering, management, medicine, law and fashion, including IIM, NIT, AIIMS, NIFT, Hidayatullah National Law University (HNLU), CIPET, Raipur, NIPER(Proposed) and IIIT.

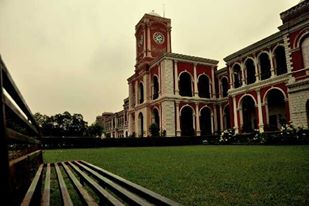
View of the Rajkumar College, Raipur

=== Premier institutes ===
- All India Institute of Medical Sciences, Raipur (AIIMS)
- Central Institute of Petrochemicals Engineering and Technology
- Hidayatullah National Law University
- Indian Institute of Management Raipur (IIM)
- International Institute of Information Technology, Naya Raipur
- National Institute of Technology, Raipur(NIT)
- National Institute of Fashion Technology Raipur
- National Institutes of Pharmaceutical Education and Research (NIPER) (Proposed) at Naya Raipur

=== Government universities ===
- Chandulal Chandrakar Patrakarita Avam Jansanchar Vishwavidyalaya
- Chhattisgarh Swami Vivekanand Technical University
- Pandit Ravishankar Shukla University

=== Private universities and deemed universities ===
- Amity University
- ITM University
- Kalinga University
- MATS University

=== Commerce, engineering, and management colleges ===
- Government Engineering College (GEC)
- Raipur Institute of Technology
- Shri Shankaracharya Institute of Professional Management and Technology (SSIPMT)

=== Secondary education ===
- Rajkumar College, established in 1882, one of the Chief's Colleges that were set up during the British Raj

== Media ==
=== News channels ===
Many local news channels are telecast from Raipur in Hindi:

News channels	Language
CG 24 news channel CG	Hindi
IBC24	Hindi
Khabar Bharti	Hindi
Grand News (Cable Network)	Hindi
News18 MP CG	Hindi
Sadhna News	Hindi
Sahara Samay Channel	Hindi
Zee MP CG	Hindi
India News MP CG	Hindi
Bansal News	Hindi
Abhi Tak (Cable Network)	Hindi
Inh News	Hindi

=== Newspapers ===
Many national and local newspapers are published from Raipur in both Hindi and English:

Newspaper	Language
Dainik Bhaskar	Hindi
Dainik Vishwa Pariwar	Hindi
Patrika	Hindi
Nava Bharat	Hindi
Deshbandhu	Hindi
Nai Duniya	Hindi
Haribhoomi	Hindi
The Times of India	English
The Central Chronicle	English
Hindustan Times	English
Hindustan	Hindi
The Hitavada	English
The Pioneer	English
Business Standard	English, Hindi
Business Bhaskar	English, Hindi

=== Radio ===
Raipur city has five FM Radio Stations -

Frequency Modulation	Channel	Slogan
94.3 FM	MY FM	Jio Dil Se
95.0 FM	FM Tadka	Sound's Good
98.3 FM	Radio Mirchi	Mirchi Sunane Wale Always Khush
101.6 FM	All India Radio Raipur & Vividh Bharti	Desh Ki Surili Dhadkan
104.8 FM	Radio Rangila	Jamm ke suno

== Notable people ==
- Lucky Ali, Bollywood singer/composer/actor, did a part of his schooling from Rajkumar College, Raipur
- Teejan Bai, traditional performing artist for Pandavani.
- Anurag Basu, a noted Bollywood movie director, was born in Raipur and later moved to the neighboring city of Bhilai.
- Harinath De, an Indian historian, scholar, and polyglot, later became the first Indian librarian of the National Library of India (then Imperial Library), spent his childhood and did his initial schooling in Raipur.
- Mohammad Hidayatullah, former Chief Justice of India and former acting president of India, received his primary education at the Government High School of Raipur until 1922.
- Akhtar Husain, Pakistani scholar, journalist and lexicographer.
- Harshad Mehta, an infamous stockbroker, spent his childhood in Raipur after his parents moved here from Mumbai.
- Rajneesh, an Indian philosopher, stayed in Raipur and taught philosophy in Raipur Sanskrit College in 1957.
- Shekhar Sen, musical mono-act player, born and raised in Raipur.
- Ravishankar Shukla, the first chief minister of the state of Madhya Pradesh, spent his childhood and was educated in Raipur.
- Vidya Charan Shukla, former Union Minister and a nine-term parliamentarian, born in Raipur
- Veer Narayan Singh, freedom fighter, jailed at Raipur by the British Army.
- K. S. Sudarshan, former chief of the Rashtriya Swayamsevak Sangh, born in Raipur in 1931.
- Habib Tanvir, a noted theatre artist and playwright, was born in Raipur in 1923.
- Swami Vivekananda spent two of his teenage years in Raipur from 1877 till 1879 when his father was transferred here.
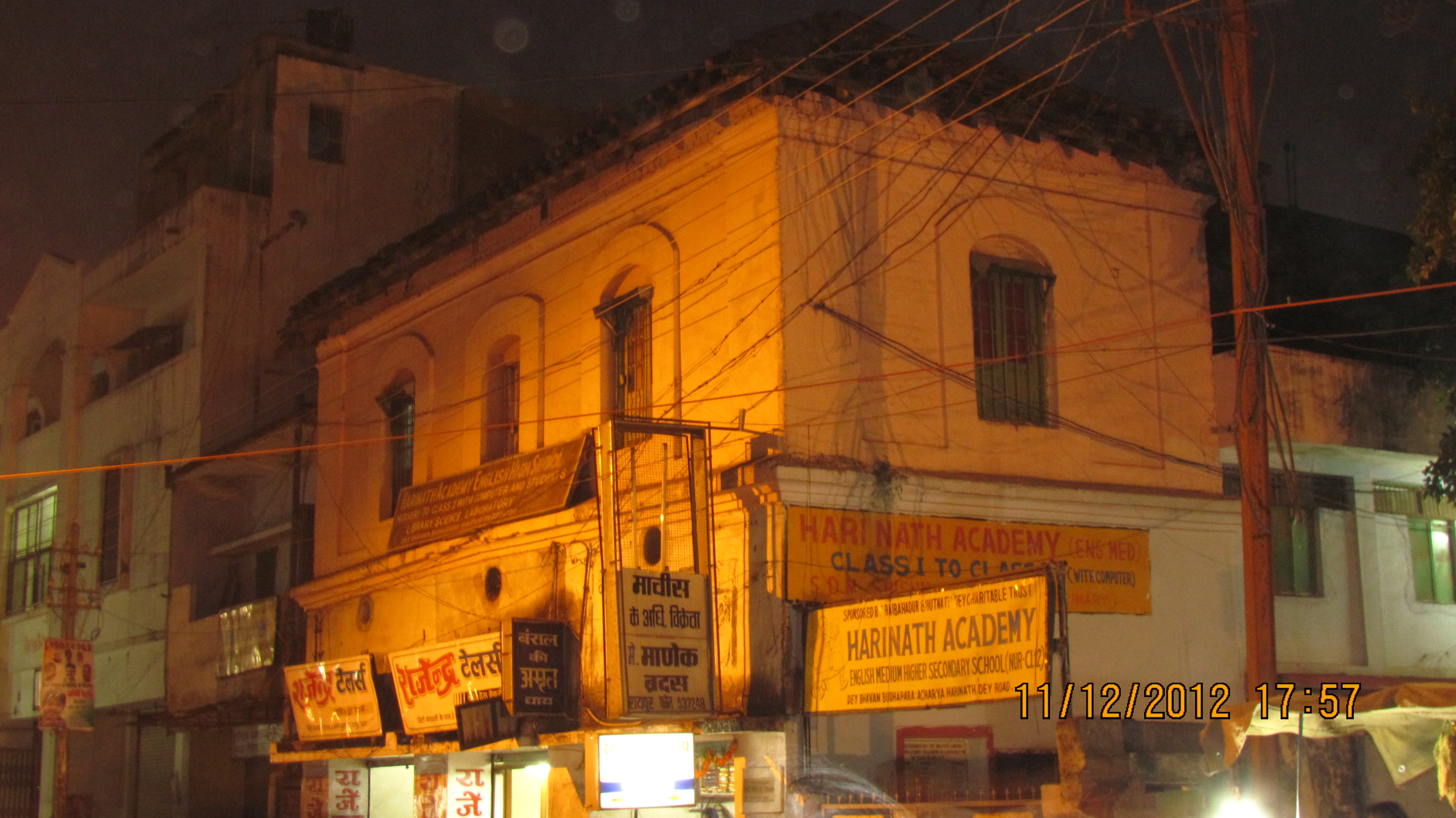
  Swami Vivekananda spent 2 of his teenage years in this building at Raipur

== See also ==
- Nava Raipur
- Shaheed Veer Narayan Singh International Cricket Stadium
- Samta colony
- Raman Singh
- Bhupesh Baghel
- Largest Indian cities by GDP
