= Durg–Raipur–Arang Expressway =

Road in Chhattisgarh, India

Durg-Raipur-Arang Expressway
- Durg–Raipur–Arang Expressway in red

Route information
- Length: 92 km (57 mi)

Major junctions
- From: Tendesara, Rajnandgaon
- To: Mahanadi Bridge, Arang

Location
- Country: India

Highway system
- Roads in India; Expressways; National; State; Asian

Durg–Raipur–Arang Expressway is underconstructed 92 km (57 mi) long, six-lane, access-controlled greenfield expressway in the state of Chhattisgarh, India. The expressway is a part of Bharatmala Pariyojana, and will pass from Durg through Anjora, Patora, Supkona, Abhanpur and Naya Raipur before terminating at Arang.

== Status updates ==
- Aug 2020: The target date for completion of proposed expressway is set as March 2024.
- Dec 2022 : Mehrotra Buildcon, and Shelke Constructions Led Joint Ventures Emerge As Lowest Bidders For the Expressway each with 46 km stretch Total 92 km

== See also ==
- Expressways in Chhattisgarh
- Expressways in India
