= Bhupendra =

Bhupendra may refer to:

- Bhupendra Bahadur Thapa (born 1967), Nepalese politician
- Bhupendra Chaudhary (born 1968), Indian politician
- Bhupendra Singh (Madhya Pradesh politician) (born 1960), Indian politician
- Bhupendra Kainthola (born 1966), current director of the FTII
- Bhupendra Kumar Datta (1892–1979), Indian freedom fighter
- Bhupendra Kumar Modi (born 1949), Indian social entrepreneur
- Bhupendra Narayan Mandal (1904–1975), Indian politician
- Bhupendra Nath Goswami (born 1950), Indian meteorologist
- Bhupendra Nath Kaushik (1924–2007), Indian poet
- Bhupendra Nath Misra (1918–?), Indian politician
- Bhupendra Nath Mitra (1875–1937), Indian diplomat
- Bhupendra Silwal (1935–2012), Nepalese long-distance runner
- Bhupendra Yadav (born 1959), Director General of Police of Rajasthan in the Indian Police Service

== Other uses ==
- Dr. Bhupendra Nath Dutta Smriti Mahavidyalaya, an Indian college
- Bhupendra Narayan Mandal University an Indian university
