= Raipur Assembly constituency =

Raipur Assembly constituency could refer to:

- Raipur, Uttarakhand Assembly constituency
- Raipur, West Bengal Assembly constituency
- One of the constituencies in or near Raipur, in Chhattisgarh
  - Raipur City South Assembly constituency
  - Raipur City North Assembly constituency
  - Raipur City West Assembly constituency
  - Raipur City Gramin Assembly constituency

== Defunct constituencies ==
- Raipur Town Assembly constituency
- Qila Raipur Assembly constituency, in Punjab
- Raipur, Madhya Pradesh Assembly constituency
- Raipur Domana Assembly constituency
