= 3rd Lok Sabha =

Lower house Members elected in 1962

←	2nd	4th	→
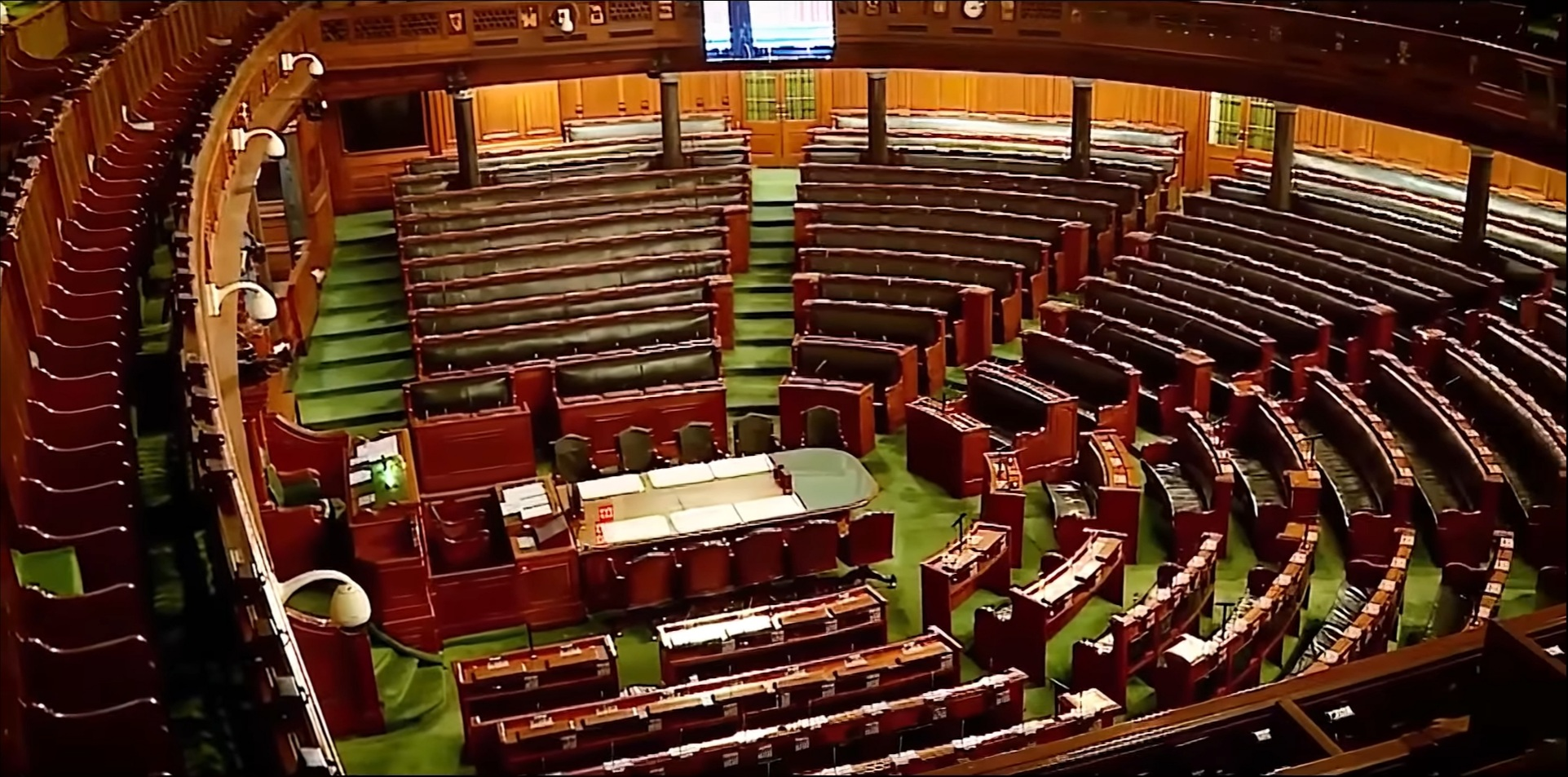
- View of Lok Sabha chamber in the Old Parliament House, New Delhi

Overview
- Legislative body: Indian Parliament
- Election: 1962 Indian general election

The 3rd Lok Sabha, (2 April 1962 – 3 March 1967) was elected in February–March 1962. The Lok Sabha (House of the People) is the lower house in the Parliament of India. The election was held for 494 seats out of which Indian national congress won 361 seats. 14 sitting members from Rajya Sabha were elected to 3rd Lok Sabha after the 1962 Indian general election.

Jawaharlal Nehru was Prime Minister as in 1st Lok Sabha and 2nd Lok Sabha, till his death on 27 May 1964.

Gulzarilal Nanda became acting Prime Minister for 13 days, before Lal Bahadur Shastri became Prime Minister on 9 June 1964. After Shastri's death on 11 January 1966, Nanda became acting Prime Minister again for 13 days. Later Indira Gandhi, Rajya Sabha member from Uttar Pradesh became Prime Minister on 24 January 1966.

The next 4th Lok Sabha was constituted on 4 March 1967 after 1967 Indian general election.

== Important members ==
- Speaker:
  - Sardar Hukam Singh from 17 April 1962 to 16 March 1967
- Deputy Speaker :
  - S. V. Krishnamoorthy Rao from 23 April 1962 to 3 March 1967
- Secretary General:
  - M. N. Kaul from 27 July 1947 to 1 September 1964
  - S. L. Shakdhar from 2 September 1964 to 18 June 1977

== List of members by political party ==
Members of the political party in the 3rd Lok Sabha are given below

3rd Lok Sabha Party Name		Number of MP's (total 494)
Indian National Congress	INC	361
Communist Party of India	CPI	29
Swatantra Party	SP	18
Bharatiya Jana Sangh	BJS	14
Praja Socialist Party	PSP	12
Dravida Munnetra Kazhagam	DMK	7
Socialist Party	SSP	6
Ganatantra Parishad	GP	4
Akali Dal	AD	3
Chota Nagpur Santhal Parganas Janata Party	CNSPJP	3
Republican Party of India	RPI	3
Indian Union Muslim League	IUML	2
Akhil Bharatiya Ram Rajya Parishad	RRP	2
All India Forward Bloc	AIFB	2
Lok Sevak Sangh	LSS	2
Revolutionary Socialist Party	RSP	2
All Party Hill Leaders Conference	APHLC	1
Akhil Bharatiya Hindu Mahasabha	ABHM	1
Haryana Lok Samiti	HLS	1
Nutan Maha Gujarat Janata Parishad	NMGJP	1
Independents	-	20
Nominated Anglo-Indians	-	2

=== Women Members ===
State	Constituency	Name of Elected M.P.	Party affiliation
Andhra Pradesh	Eluru	Viramachaneni Vimla Devi	Communist Party of India
Andhra Pradesh	Kurnool	Yashoda Reddy	Indian National Congress
Andhra Pradesh	Vicarabad	Sangam Laxmi Bai	Indian National Congress
Andhra Pradesh	Khammam	T. Lakshmi Kantamma	Indian National Congress
Assam	Cachar (SC)	Jyotsna Chanda	Indian National Congress
Assam	Barpeta	Renuka Devi Barkataki	Indian National Congress
Bihar	Banka	Shakuntala Devi	Indian National Congress
Bihar	Barh	Tarkeshwari Sinha	Indian National Congress
Bihar	Patna	Ram Dulari Sinha	Indian National Congress
Bihar	Aurangabad	Rani Lalita Rajya Laxmi	Swatantra Party
Bihar	Jahanabad	Satyabhama Devi	Indian National Congress
Bihar	Chatra	Vijaya Raje	Swatantra Party
Gujrat	Amreli	Jayaben Shah	Indian National Congress
Gujrat	Banaskantha	Zohraben Chavda	Indian National Congress
Madhya Pradesh	Gwalior	Vijaya Raje Scindia	Indian National Congress
Madhya Pradesh	Baloda Bazar	Minimata Agam Dass Guru	Indian National Congress
Madhya Pradesh	Raipur	Keshar Kumari Devi	Indian National Congress
Madhya Pradesh	Damoh (SC)	Sahodrabai Rai	Indian National Congress
Madhya Pradesh	Bhopal	Maimoona Sultan	Indian National Congress
Madhya Pradesh	Jhabua (ST)	Jamuna Devi	Indian National Congress
Madras	Nilgiris	Akkamma Devi	Indian National Congress
Maharashtra	Ratnagiri	Sharda Mukherjee	Indian National Congress
Mysore	Dharwad North	Sarojini Mahishi	Indian National Congress
Rajasthan	Jaipur	Gayatri Devi	Swatantra Party
Uttar Pradesh	Mohanlalganj (SC)	Ganga Devi	Indian National Congress
Uttar Pradesh	Kaiserganj	Basant Kunwari	Swatantra Party
Uttar Pradesh	Balrampur	Subhadra Joshi	Indian National Congress
Uttar Pradesh	Banda	Savitri Nigam	Indian National Congress
Uttar Pradesh	Jhansi	Dr. Sushila Nayar	Indian National Congress
Uttar Pradesh	Hapur	Kamla Chaudhry	Indian National Congress
West Bengal	Malda	Renuka Ray	Indian National Congress
