= Raipur Lok Sabha constituency =

Lok Sabha Constituency in Chhattisgarh, India

Coordinates: 21.3°N 81.6°E

Raipur CG-8
- Lok Sabha constituency
- Interactive Map Outlining Raipur Lok Sabha constituency

Constituency details
- Country: India
- Region: Central India
- State: Chhattisgarh
- Assembly constituencies: Baloda Bazar; Bhatapara; Dharsiwa; Raipur Rural; Raipur City West; Raipur City North; Raipur City South; Arang; Abhanpur
- Established: 1952
- Reservation: None

Member of Parliament
- 18th Lok Sabha
- Incumbent Brijmohan Agrawal
- Party: Bharatiya Janata Party
- Elected year: 2024

Raipur is a Lok Sabha parliamentary constituency in Chhattisgarh. The constituency consist of Raipur District and Baloda Bazar district. This Constituency is one of the important constituency in India.

== Bilaspur-Durg-Raipur Lok Sabha constituency ==
During the 1951-52 Lok Sabha elections, Bilaspur, Durg and Raipur formed a joint parliamentary constituency. This arrangement continued until the 1956 delimitation, when the areas were separated into present three distinct constituencies.

The joint constituency elected two Members of Parliament, Bhupendra Nath Mishra & Agam Dass Guru. After Guru Agam Das Guru's death in 1955, his wife Minimata won the subsequent by-election, becoming the third representative from this region.

== Vidhan Sabha segments ==
Raipur Lok Sabha constituency is composed of the following assembly segments:

Name	District	Member	Party	Leading (in 2024)
Baloda Bazar	Baloda Bazar	Tank Ram Verma	BJP	BJP
Bhatapara	Baloda Bazar	Inder Kumar Sao	INC	BJP
Dharsiwa	Raipur	Anuj Sharma	BJP	BJP
Raipur Rural	Raipur	Motilal Sahu	BJP	BJP
Raipur City West	Raipur	Rajesh Munat	BJP	BJP
Raipur City North	Raipur	Purandar Mishra	BJP	BJP
Raipur City South	Raipur	Sunil Kumar Soni	BJP	BJP
Arang (SC)	Raipur	Guru Khushwant Saheb	BJP	BJP
Abhanpur	Raipur	Indra Kumar Sahu	BJP	BJP

== Members of Parliament ==
Year	Member	Party
1952	Bhupendra Nath Misra (Note: for the joint Lok Sabha constituency of Bilaspur-Durg-Raipur)	Indian National Congress
1952	Agam Dass Guru	Indian National Congress
1955^	Minimata Agam Dass Guru (Note: Minimata was elected in by-elections in 1955 after the sudden demise of the sitting MP, her husband Guru Agam Dass.)	Indian National Congress
1957	Birendra Bahadur Singh (Note: for the now separate Lok Sabha constituency of Raipur)	Indian National Congress
1957	Keshar Kumari Devi	Indian National Congress
1962	Keshar Kumari Devi	Indian National Congress
1967	Lakhan Lal Gupta	Indian National Congress
1971	Vidya Charan Shukla	Indian National Congress
1977	Purushottam Kaushik	Janata Party
1980	Keyur Bhushan	Indian National Congress
1984	Keyur Bhushan	Indian National Congress
1989	Ramesh Bais	Bharatiya Janata Party
1991	Vidya Charan Shukla	Indian National Congress
1996	Ramesh Bais	Bharatiya Janata Party
1998	Ramesh Bais	Bharatiya Janata Party
1999	Ramesh Bais	Bharatiya Janata Party
2004	Ramesh Bais	Bharatiya Janata Party
2009	Ramesh Bais	Bharatiya Janata Party
2014	Ramesh Bais	Bharatiya Janata Party
2019	Sunil Kumar Soni	Bharatiya Janata Party
2024	Brijmohan Agrawal	Bharatiya Janata Party

== Election results ==
=== 2024 ===
2024 Indian general election: Raipur
Party	Candidate	Votes	%	±%
BJP	Brijmohan Agrawal	10,50,351	66.19	+6.18
INC	Vikas Upadhyay	4,75,066	29.94	−5.13
NOTA	None of the above	4,448	0.28	−0.03
Majority		5,75,285	36.25	+11.31
Turnout		15,92,011	67.00	+0.84
BJP hold		Swing		

=== 2019 ===
2019 Indian general elections: Raipur
Party	Candidate	Votes	%	±%
BJP	Sunil Kumar Soni	837,902	60.01	+7.65
INC	Pramod Dubey	4,89,664	35.07	−3.57
BSP	Khilesh Kumar Sahu	10,597	0.76	−0.29
SS	Santosh Yadav	9,690	0.69	New
IND.	Tarzan Jangde	6,301	0.45	+0.37
NOTA	None of the Above	4,292	0.31	−0.15
Majority		3,51,238	24.94	+11.22
Turnout		13,97,142	66.16	+0.47
BJP hold		Swing	+7.65	

=== 2014 results ===
2014 Indian general elections: Raipur
Party	Candidate	Votes	%	±%
BJP	Ramesh Bais	654,922	52.36	+3.17
INC	Satya Narayan Sharma	4,83,276	38.64	−2.75
AAP	Sandeep Tiwari	15,139	1.21	N/A
BSP	Guruji Virendra Kumar Dahariya	13,147	1.05	−1.22
IND.	Om Prakash Dande	12,699	1.02	N/A
NOTA	None of the Above	5,796	0.46	N/A
Majority		1,71,646	13.72	+5.92
Turnout		12,50,845	65.69	+18.69
BJP hold		Swing	+3.17	

=== 2009 results ===
2009 Indian general elections: Raipur
Party	Candidate	Votes	%	±%
BJP	Ramesh Bais	3,64,943	49.19	
INC	Bhupesh Baghel	3,07,042	41.39	
BSP	Vidhya Devi Sahu	16,853	2.27	
Independent	Navin Gupta	8,123	1.09	
Independent	Shrikant Kaser	6,208	0.84	
Majority		57,901	7.80	
Turnout		7,41,861	47.00	
BJP hold		Swing		

=== 2004 results ===
2004 Indian general elections: Raipur
Party	Candidate	Votes	%	±%
BJP	Ramesh Bais	3,76,029	54.54	
INC	Shyama Charan Shukla	2,46,510	35.75	
BSP	Dr. Heeraman Banjare	32,252	4.68	
Majority		1,29,519	18.79	
Turnout		6,89,517	50.32	
BJP hold		Swing		

=== 1977 Election ===
- Purushottam Lal Kaushik (BLD) : 186,296 votes
- Vidyacharan Shukla (INC) : 102,684

== See also ==
- Raipur
- List of constituencies of the Lok Sabha
