= Abhanpur Assembly constituency =

Legislative Assembly constituency in Chhattisgarh State, India

Coordinates: 21.05°N 81.74°E

Abhanpur
- Constituency No. 53 for the Chhattisgarh Legislative Assembly

Constituency details
- Country: India
- Region: Central India
- State: Chhattisgarh
- District: Raipur
- Lok Sabha constituency: Raipur
- Established: 2008
- Total electors: 214,002
- Reservation: None

Member of Legislative Assembly
- 6th Chhattisgarh Legislative Assembly
- Incumbent Indra Kumar Sahu
- Party: Bharatiya Janata Party
- Elected year: 2023

Abhanpur is one of the 90 Legislative Assembly constituencies of Chhattisgarh state in India. It is in Raipur district. The seat has formed after the demolition of Raipur Town Vidhansabha Constituency in 2008. As of 2023, it is represented by Indra Kumar Sahu of the Bharatiya Janata Party.

== Members of the Legislative Assembly ==
Year	Member	Party
Madhya Pradesh Legislative Assembly
Prior to 1961: Constituency did not exist
1962	Lakhanlal Gupta	Indian National Congress
1967	N. R. Panchhiram	Indian National Congress
1972	Chetram Parshottam	Bharatiya Jana Sangh
1977	Chetram Parshottam	Janata Party
1980	Tetku	Indian National Congress
1985	Chandra Shekhar Sahu	Bharatiya Janta Party
1990	Chandra Shekhar Sahu	Bharatiya Janta Party
1993	Dhanendra Sahu	Indian National Congress
1998	Dhanendra Sahu	Indian National Congress
Chhattisgarh Legislative Assembly
2003	Dhanendra Sahu	Indian National Congress
2008	Chandra Shekhar Sahu	Bharatiya Janta Party
2013	Dhanendra Sahu	Indian National Congress
2018	Dhanendra Sahu	Indian National Congress
2023	Indra Kumar Sahu	Bharatiya Janata Party

== Election results ==
=== Assembly Election 2023 ===
2023 Chhattisgarh Legislative Assembly election : Abhanpur
Party	Candidate	Votes	%	±%
BJP	Indra Kumar Sahu	93,295	52.61%	▲19.31
INC	Dhanendra Sahu	77,742	43.84%	▼4.12
JCC	Makhan Lal Tamrakar	2,379	1.34%	▼11.98
NOTA	None of the Above	2,087	1.18%	▼0.70
Margin of victory		15,553	8.77%	▼5.89
Turnout		1,77,340	83.92%	▲0.47
Registered electors		2,14,002		▲10.17
BJP gain from INC		Swing	▲4.65	

=== Assembly Election 2018 ===
2018 Chhattisgarh Legislative Assembly election : Abhanpur
Party	Candidate	Votes	%	±%
INC	Dhanendra Sahu	76,761	47.96%	▼0.07
BJP	Chandra Shekhar Sahu	53,290	33.30%	▼8.83
JCC	Dayaram Nishad	21,324	13.32%	New
NOTA	None of the Above	3,005	1.88%	▼1.00
Independent	Bramhanand Sahu	2,249	1.41%	New
Independent	Shweta Rakesh Sahu	2,040	1.27%	New
Margin of victory		23,471	14.66%	▲8.76
Turnout		1,60,050	84.04%	▲0.54
Registered electors		1,94,246		▲12.42
INC hold		Swing	▼0.07	

=== Assembly Election 2013 ===
2013 Chhattisgarh Legislative Assembly election : Abhanpur
Party	Candidate	Votes	%	±%
INC	Dhanendra Sahu	67,926	48.03%	▲2.51
BJP	Chandra Shekhar Sahu	59,572	42.12%	▼4.64
Chattisgarh Swabhiman Manch	Radhakrishna Tandon	8,134	5.75%	New
NOTA	None of the Above	4,071	2.88%	New
Independent	Hemant Kumar Tandon	2,497	1.77%	New
BSP	Yaujy Singh Sonwani	1,186	0.84%	▼1.77
Margin of victory		8,354	5.91%	▲4.67
Turnout		1,41,431	84.24%	▲5.37
Registered electors		1,72,782		▲9.84
INC gain from BJP		Swing	▲1.27	

=== Assembly Election 2008 ===
2008 Chhattisgarh Legislative Assembly election : Abhanpur
Party	Candidate	Votes	%	±%
BJP	Chandra Shekhar Sahu	56,249	46.76%	▲2.63
INC	Dhanendra Sahu	54,759	45.52%	▲1.19
BSP	Shailendra Singh	3,140	2.61%	▲0.07
Independent	Hemant Kumar Tandan	2,791	2.32%	New
Independent	Rekhram Chturwedani	1,129	0.94%	New
Margin of victory		1,490	1.24%	▲1.04
Turnout		1,20,302	76.49%	▼5.16
Registered electors		1,57,297		▲11.35
BJP gain from INC		Swing	▲2.43	

=== Assembly Election 2003 ===
2003 Chhattisgarh Legislative Assembly election : Abhanpur
Party	Candidate	Votes	%	±%
INC	Dhanendra Sahu	51,122	44.33%	New
BJP	Chandra Shekhar Sahu	50,895	44.13%	New
NCP	Kailash Mishra	5,519	4.79%	New
BSP	Amar Singh Nishad	2,934	2.54%	New
SP	Tikendra Thakur	2,291	1.99%	New
Independent	Hemant Kumar Tandon	1,615	1.40%	New
Independent	Shekhu Ram Banjare	957	0.83%	New
Margin of victory		227	0.20%	
Turnout		1,15,333	81.64%	
Registered electors		1,41,268		
INC win (new seat)				

== See also ==
- List of constituencies of the Chhattisgarh Legislative Assembly
- Raipur district
