= Chandra Shekhar Sahu =

Indian politician

Minister of Agriculture Government of Chhattisgarh
- In office 22 December 2008 – 12 December 2013
- Chief Minister: Raman Singh
- Succeeded by: Brijmohan Agrawal

Minister of Animal Husbandry & Fisheries Government of Chhattisgarh
- In office 22 December 2008 – 12 December 2013
- Chief Minister: Raman Singh
- Succeeded by: Brijmohan Agrawal

Minister of Labour Government of Chhattisgarh
- In office 22 December 2008 – 12 December 2013
- Chief Minister: Raman Singh
- Succeeded by: Amar Agrawal

Member of Chhattisgarh Legislative Assembly
- In office 2008–2013
- Preceded by: Dhanendra Sahu
- Succeeded by: Dhanendra Sahu
- Constituency: Abhanpur

Member of Parliament, Lok Sabha
- In office 1998–1999
- Preceded by: Pawan Diwan
- Succeeded by: Shyama Charan Shukla
- Constituency: Mahasamund

Member of Madhya Pradesh Legislative Assembly
- In office 1985–1992
- Preceded by: Tetku
- Succeeded by: Dhanendra Sahu
- Constituency: Abhanpur

Personal details
- Born: 2 July 1956 (age 69) Manik Chauri, Raipur district, Madhya Pradesh
- Political party: Bharatiya Janata Party
- Spouse: Dineshwari Sahu (m. 1977)
- Children: 2 sons, 1 daughter
- Parent: Sunderlal Sahu (father)

Chandra Shekhar Sahu is an Indian politician and member of the Bharatiya Janata Party. Sahu was a member of the Lok Sabha from the Mahasamund (Lok Sabha constituency) in Mahasamund district of Chhattisgarh.
