= Raipur Town Assembly constituency =

Raipur Town
- Former constituency for the State Legislative Assembly

Constituency details
- Country: India
- State: Madhya Pradesh (1976 – 2000); Chhattisgarh (2000 – 2008)
- District: Raipur
- Lok Sabha constituency: Raipur
- Established: 1976
- Abolished: 2008

Raipur Town (sometimes called Raipur Nagar) was one of the 320 constituencies of the Madhya Pradesh and later 90 constitutencies of the Chhattisgarh state in India. The seat was formed in 1976 after the dissolution of Raipur Vidhan Sabha Constituency. It was a part of Raipur district. After 2008 Delimitation of State Assembly constituencies, Raipur Town was bifurcated into three constituencies, Raipur City North, Raipur City South and Raipur City West.

== Members of the Legislative Assembly ==
Year	Member	Party
Until 1977: Constituency did not exist, see Raipur, Madhya Pradesh Assembly constituency
As Madhya Pradesh Legislative Assembly constituency
1977	Rajani Tai Upasane	Janata Party
1980	Swarupchand Jain	Indian National Congress
1985	Swarupchand Jain	Indian National Congress
1990	Brijmohan Agrawal	Bharatiya Janata Party
1993	Brijmohan Agrawal	Bharatiya Janata Party
1998	Brijmohan Agrawal	Bharatiya Janata Party
As Chhattisgarh Legislative Assembly constituency
2003	Brijmohan Agrawal	Bharatiya Janata Party
Constituency abolished see Raipur City North, Raipur City South, Raipur City West

== Election results ==
=== Assembly Election 2003 ===
2003 Chhattisgarh Legislative Assembly election : Raipur Town
Party	Candidate	Votes	%	±%
BJP	Brijmohan Agrawal	70,164	56.92%	New
INC	Gajraj Pagariya	44,190	35.85%	New
NCP	Salam Rizvi	3,903	3.17%	New
Independent	Hitendra Vyas	2,142	1.74%	New
Independent	Adv. Hitendra Tiwari	1,208	0.98%	New
Margin of victory		25,974	21.07%	
Turnout		123,260	67.30%	
Registered electors		183,193		
BJP win (new seat)				
