= Shyamkumari Devi =

Indian politician

Member of Parliament Rajya Sabha
- In office 1968–1980
- Constituency: Madhya Pradesh

Member of Parliament Lok Sabha
- In office 1963-1967
- Preceded by: Keshar Kumari Devi
- Succeeded by: Lakhan Lal Gupta
- Constituency: Raipur, Madhya Pradesh

Personal details
- Born: 1910
- Died: 1984 (aged 73–74)
- Party: Indian National Congress

Shyamkumari Devi was an Indian politician. She was a Member of Parliament, representing Madhya Pradesh in the Rajya Sabha the upper house of India's Parliament representing the Indian National Congress.
