= Brijmohan Agrawal =

Member of the Lok Sabha

Member of Parliament, Lok Sabha
- Incumbent
- Assumed office 4 June 2024
- Preceded by: Sunil Soni
- Constituency: Raipur

Minister of Parliamentary Affairs, Minister of Tourism, Minister of Education Government of Chhattisgarh
- In office 13 December 2023 – 19 June 2024
- Chief Minister: Vishnu Deo Sai
- Preceded by: Ravindra Choubey (Parliamentary Affairs); Tamradhwaj Sahu (Tourism)
- Succeeded by: Kedar Kashyap (Parliamentary Affairs); Rajesh Agrawal (Tourism); Gajendra Yadav (Education)

Member of Chhattisgarh Legislative Assembly
- In office December 2008 – 17 June 2024
- Preceded by: Constituency established
- Succeeded by: Sunil Kumar Soni
- Constituency: Raipur South
- In office 1990–2008
- Preceded by: Swarupchand Jain
- Succeeded by: constituency abolished
- Constituency: Raipur Town

Minister of Agriculture, Animal Husbandry, Fisheries, Ayacut, Water Resources, Government of Chhattisgarh
- In office 9 December 2013 – 11 December 2018
- Chief Minister: Raman Singh
- Preceded by: Chandra Shekhar Sahu
- Succeeded by: Ravindra Choubey

Minister of Parliamentary affairs, Government of Chhattisgarh
- In office 22 December 2008 – 11 December 2013
- Chief Minister: Raman Singh
- Preceded by: Ajay Chandrakar
- Succeeded by: Ajay Chandrakar

Minister of Public Works Department, School Education, Government of Chhattisgarh
- In office 8 December 2008 – 8 December 2013
- Chief Minister: Raman Singh
- Preceded by: Rajesh Munat
- Succeeded by: Rajesh Munat

Minister of Culture and Tourism Government of Chhattisgarh
- In office 7 December 2003 – 8 December 2013
- Chief Minister: Raman Singh
- Preceded by: Dhanendra Sahu
- Succeeded by: Ajay Chandrakar

Minister of Sports and Youth Welfare, Government of Chhattisgarh
- In office 11 February 2006 – 7 December 2008
- Chief Minister: Raman Singh
- Succeeded by: Lata Usendi

Cabinet Minister of Revenue and Disaster Management Rehabilitation, Law and Legislative Affairs, Government of Chhattisgarh
- In office 18 June 2005 – 7 December 2008
- Chief Minister: Raman Singh
- Preceded by: Nanki Ram Kanwar
- Succeeded by: Amar Agrawal

Minister of Home Affairs, Government of Chhattisgarh
- In office 7 December 2003 – 18 June 2005
- Chief Minister: Dr. Raman Singh
- Preceded by: Nandkumar Patel
- Succeeded by: Ramvichar Netam

Minister of Labour Government of Chhattisgarh
- In office 7 December 2003 – 18 June 2005
- Chief Minister: Raman Singh
- Preceded by: Shankar Sodhi
- Succeeded by: Hemchand Yadav

Minister of State (Independent Charge) for Local Administration, Urban development, Tourism and Culture, Science, Technology, Government of Madhya Pradesh
- In office 1990–1992

Personal details
- Born: 1 May 1959 (age 67) Raipur, Madhya Pradesh, India (now in Chhattisgarh, India)
- Party: Bharatiya Janata Party
- Spouse: Sarita Devi Agrawal
- Children: 3 (2 Sons, 1 Daughter)
- Education: Pandit Ravishankar Shukla University
- Website: brijmohanagrawal.in
- As of 30 October 2024

Brijmohan Agrawal (born 1 May 1959) is an Indian politician from Chhattisgarh. He is a member of the Lok Sabha from Raipur. He was an eight time Member of Vidhan Sabha representing Raipur Town & later Raipur City South from 1990 till 2024. He served as minister in several departments of the Madhya Pradesh government and, after formation, the Chhattisgarh government. Most recently he was in Sai cabinet from 2023 to 2024. He is a senior member of the Bharatiya Janata Party.

== Early life and education ==
Agrawal is from Raipur, Chhattisgarh. He married Sunita and they have three children. He completed his M.Com. in 1982 at Pandit Ravishankar Shukla University, Raipur.

== Career ==
He was first elected to Madhya Pradesh Legislative Assembly in 1990 from Raipur Town Constituency and was re-elected in 1993 and 1998 from the same constituency. After the creation of Chhattisgarh out of Madhya Pradesh, he was elected to Chhattisgarh Legislative Assembly in 2003 from same seat and became Cabinet Minister for Home, Prison, Culture and Tourism. He was given charge of Revenue, Culture, and Tourism, Law and Rehabilitation in 2005 and additional charge of forest, sports and youth Affairs in 2006.

In 2008, Raipur Town seat got delimitised and divided into 4 seats and he contested from Raipur City South and won by margin of 65,686 and became Cabinet Minister for School Education, Public Works Department, Parliamentary Affairs, Tourism, and Endowment Trust Culture in second Raman Singh's Ministry. He retained the seat in 2013 from Raipur City South by margin of 34,799 and became Cabinet Minister for Agriculture & Bio-Technology, Animal Husbandry, Fish Rearing, Water Resources, Irrigation, Ayacut and Religious Trusts & Endowment in Raman Singh Third ministry. In 2018, he reached the assembly from Raipur South for the third time in a row with 77,589 votes. in 2023, for the fourth In the 2018 elections, Agrawal was the MLA with the lowest winning margin.

In the 2023 assembly elections, he became MLA for the eighth consecutive time. This was his fourth consecutive win from Raipur South in which he defeated Mahant Ramsundar Das of Dudhdhari Math by a huge margin. After which he became the Minister of Parliamentary Affairs, Tourism and Education in the Vishnudev Sai government.

Four months after becoming a minister, he contested the 2024 Lok Sabha elections from Raipur on BJP ticket and won the election by a huge margin. Agrawal defeated his closest rival Vikas Upadhyay of the Congress by about 5.75 lakh votes. It was one of the biggest electoral victories in the country in 2024 elections.

== Electoral history ==
Year	House	Constituency	Result	Party	Ref.
1990	Madhya Pradesh Legislative Assembly	Raipur Town	Won	Bharatiya Janata Party	
1993	Madhya Pradesh Legislative Assembly	Raipur Town	Won	Bharatiya Janata Party	
1998	Madhya Pradesh Legislative Assembly	Raipur Town	Won	Bharatiya Janata Party	
2003	Chhattisgarh Legislative Assembly	Raipur Town	Won	Bharatiya Janata Party	
2008	Chhattisgarh Legislative Assembly	Raipur City South	Won	Bharatiya Janata Party	
2013	Chhattisgarh Legislative Assembly	Raipur City South	Won	Bharatiya Janata Party	
2018	Chhattisgarh Legislative Assembly	Raipur City South	Won	Bharatiya Janata Party	
2023	Chhattisgarh Legislative Assembly	Raipur City South	Won	Bharatiya Janata Party	
2024	Lok Sabha	Raipur	Won	Bharatiya Janata Party	

== Positions held ==
Brijmohan Agrawal has been elected 8 times as MLA and currently serves as a Member of Parliament, Lok Sabha.

#	From	To	Position	Party
1.	1990	1993	MLA (1st term) in Madhya Pradesh Legislative Assembly from Raipur City	BJP
2.	1993	1998	MLA (2nd term) in Madhya Pradesh Legislative Assembly from Raipur City; Minister of State (Independent Charge) for Tourism, Science & Technology in Government of MP	BJP
3.	1998	2003	MLA (3rd term) in Madhya Pradesh Legislative Assembly (1998–2000) and Chhattisgarh Legislative Assembly (2000–2003) from Raipur City	BJP
4.	2003	2008	MLA (4th term) from Raipur City South; Cabinet Minister (Home, Jail, Public Works Department) in Government of Chhattisgarh	BJP
5.	2008	2013	MLA (5th term) from Raipur City South; Cabinet Minister (School Education, Public Works Department, Tourism & Culture)	BJP
6.	2013	2018	MLA (6th term) from Raipur City South; Cabinet Minister (Agriculture, Animal Husbandry, Fisheries, Water Resources)	BJP
7.	2018	2023	MLA (7th term) from Raipur City South	BJP
8.	2023	2024	MLA (8th term) from Raipur City South (resigned in 2024); Cabinet Minister (School Education, Higher Education, Tourism & Culture)	BJP
9.	2024	Present	MP (1st term) in 18th Lok Sabha from Raipur	BJP
