= Urla =

Urla may refer to:

- Urla, İzmir, a district of Izmir Province, Turkey
- Urla, Raipur, a town in Chhattisgarh, India
