= Raipur City railway station =

Railway station Chhattisgarh

Raipur City

General information
- Location: Raipur, Chhattisgarh; India
- Coordinates: 21.2533°N 81.6481°E
- Elevation: 294 metres (965 ft)
- System: Indian Railways station
- Owner: Indian Railways
- Operator: Raipur railway division
- Line: Raipur–Dhamtari branch line
- Platforms: 5
- Tracks: 6
- Connections: Auto stand

Construction
- Structure type: Standard (on-ground station)
- Parking: yes
- Cycle facilities: yes

Other information
- Status: Narrow gauge
- Station code: RCT
- Fare zone: South East Central Railway

Services
Preceding station	Indian Railways	Following station
Raipur Junction towards ?	South East Central Railway zone Raipur–Dhamtari branch line	Telibandha towards ?
Location

Raipur City railway station was a railway station in Raipur district, Chhattisgarh. Its code is RCT. It served Raipur city. The station consisted of one narrow-gauge platform. The station lied on the Raipur–Dhamtari branch line of Bilaspur–Nagpur section.
