= Banarsi =

- city
- Location in India Banarsi (India)
- Coordinates: 21.18084°N 81.71675°E
- Country: India
- State: Chhattisgarh
- District: Raipur

Population (2001)
  - Total: 10,648

Languages
  - Official: Hindi, Chhattisgarhi
- Time zone: UTC+5:30 (IST)
- Vehicle registration: CG

Banarsi is a census town in Raipur District in the state of Chhattisgarh, India.

== Demographics ==
As of 2001 India census, Banarsi had a population of 10,648. Males constituted 52% of the population and females 48%. Banarsi had an average literacy rate of 73%, higher than the national average of 59.5%, with 58% of the males and 42% of females literate. 13% of the population was under 6 years of age.
