= Ramesh Bais =

Indian politician (born 1947)

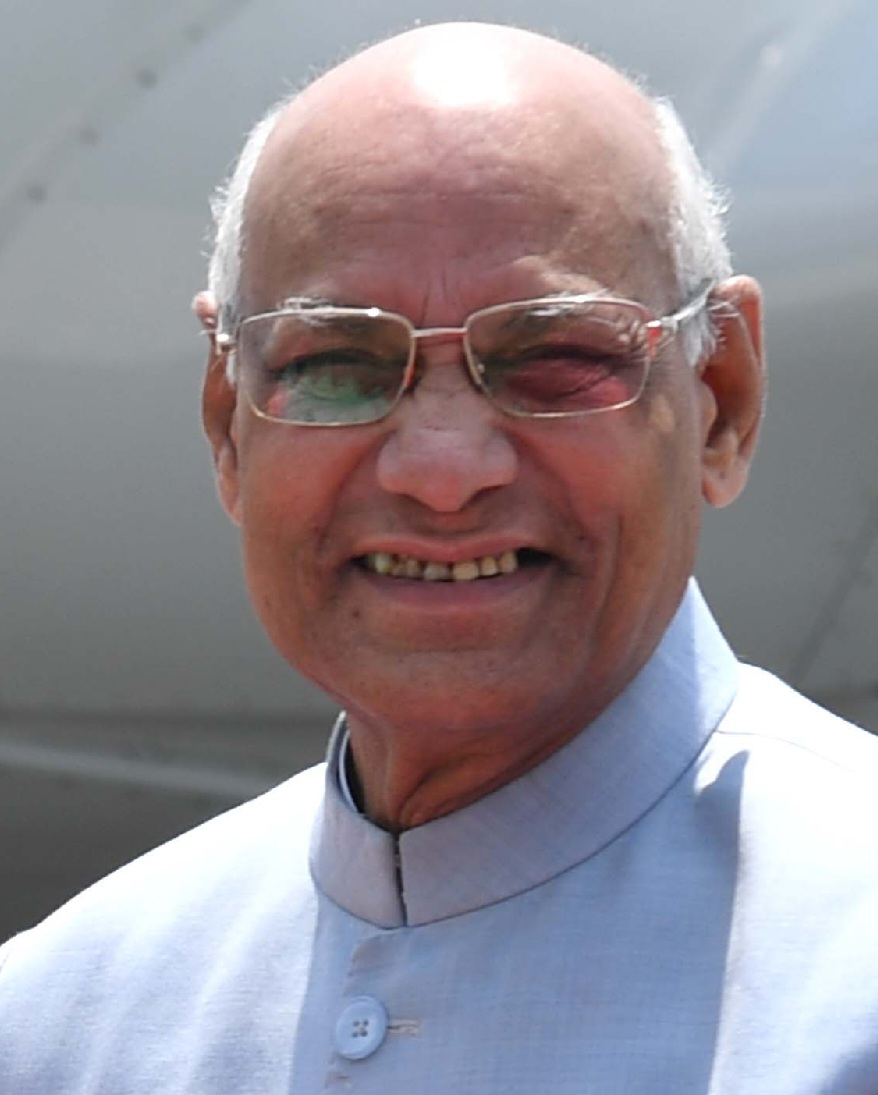
- Ramesh Bais in 2024

20th Governor of Maharashtra
- In office 18 February 2023 – 30 July 2024
- Chief Minister: Eknath Shinde
- Preceded by: Bhagat Singh Koshyari
- Succeeded by: C. P. Radhakrishnan

9th Governor of Jharkhand
- In office 14 July 2021 – 17 February 2023
- Chief Minister: Hemant Soren
- Preceded by: Droupadi Murmu
- Succeeded by: C. P. Radhakrishnan

17th Governor of Tripura
- In office 29 July 2019 – 13 July 2021
- Chief Minister: Biplab Kumar Deb
- Preceded by: Kaptan Singh Solanki
- Succeeded by: Satyadev Narayan Arya

Union Minister of Environment & Forests
- MoS Independent Charge
- In office 9 January 2004 – 23 May 2004
- Prime Minister: Atal Bihari Vajpayee
- Preceded by: T. R. Baalu
- Succeeded by: Andimuthu Raja

Union Minister of Mines
- MoS Independent Charge
- In office 29 January 2003 – 8 January 2004
- Prime Minister: Atal Bihari Vajpayee
- Preceded by: Uma Bharti
- Succeeded by: Mamata Banerjee

Union Minister of State for Information and Broadcasting
- In office 30 September 2000 – 28 January 2003
- Prime Minister: Atal Bihari Vajpayee

Union Minister of State for Chemicals and Fertilizers
- In office 13 October 1999 – 30 September 2000
- Prime Minister: Atal Bihari Vajpayee

Union Minister of State for Steel and Mines
- In office 19 March 1998 – 13 October 1999
- Prime Minister: Atal Bihari Vajpayee

Member of Parliament, Lok Sabha
- In office 10 May 1996 – 24 May 2019
- Preceded by: Vidya Charan Shukla
- Succeeded by: Sunil Kumar Soni
- Constituency: Raipur
- In office 1 December 1989 – 21 June 1991
- Preceded by: Keyur Bhushan
- Succeeded by: Vidya Charan Shukla
- Constituency: Raipur

Member of the Mandhya Pradesh
- In office 1980–1985
- Preceded by: Ram Lal Jodhan
- Succeeded by: Satyanarayan Sharma
- Constituency: Mandirhasod

Personal details
- Born: 2 August 1947 (age 79) Raipur, Central Provinces and Berar, British India (now in Chhattisgarh, India)
- Party: Bharatiya Janata Party
- Spouse: Rambai Bais (m. 1968)
- Children: 3 (a son and two daughters)

Ramesh Bais (born 2 August 1947) is an Indian politician who served as the 20th Governor of Maharashtra from 2023 to 2024. A senior leader of the Bharatiya Janata Party, Bais has held a positions including, Governor of Jharkhand and Tripura, and served as a Union Minister in the government of Prime Minister Atal Bihari Vajpayee. He was a seven-term member of the Lok Sabha, representing the Raipur constituency.

== Personal life ==
Bais was born on 2 August 1947 in Raipur, Central Provinces and Berar, British India (now in Chhattisgarh, India) to Khomlal Bais. He completed his Higher Secondary education from B.S.E., Bhopal. He married Rambai Bais on 1 May 1968. They have a son and two daughters. Bais is an agriculturist by profession.

== Political career ==
Bais was first elected to Municipal Corporation of Raipur in 1978. He won 1980 MP Assembly election from Mandirhasod Constituency but lost 1985 Assembly election to his Congress rival Satyanarayan Sharma. He was elected for the first time to the Indian parliament as a member of the 9th Lok Sabha from Raipur in 1989 and was re-elected consecutively from 1996 to 11th, 12th, 13th, 14th, 15th and 16th Lok Sabha.

=== Positions held ===
- Sources

==== State level ====
- 1978: Councillor, Municipal Corporation, Raipur
- 1980-85: Member, Madhya Pradesh Legislative Assembly
- 1980-82: Member, Estimates Committee, Madhya Pradesh Legislative Assembly
- 1982-85 : Member, Library Committee, Madhya Pradesh Legislative Assembly
- 1982-88 : Pradesh Mantri, Bharatiya Janata Party (B.J.P.), Madhya Pradesh

==== National level ====
- 1989 : Elected to 9th Lok Sabha
- 1989-90 & 1994–96 : Vice-President, B.J.P., Madhya Pradesh
- 1990-97 : Member, Public Accounts Committee Member, Consultative Committee, Ministry of Steel and Mines
- 1993 onwards : Member, National Executive, B.J.P.
- 1994 onwards : Member, Executive Committee, B.J.P., Madhya Pradesh
- 1996 : Elected to 11th Lok Sabha (2nd term)
  - Member, Committee on Agriculture
  - Member, Committee on Petitions
  - Member, Consultative Committee, Ministry of Industry
- 1998 : Elected to 12th Lok Sabha (3rd term)

==== Union Minister ====
Served as Union Minister of State in Second and Third Vajpayee ministry holding various portfolios such as Steel, Mines, Chemicals and Fertilizers, Information and Broadcasting, and also Minister of State (Independent charge) for Mines and Environment & Forests.

- 1998-99 : Union Minister of State, Steel and Mines
- 1999 : Elected to 13th Lok Sabha (4th term)
- 13 October 1999 - 30 September 2000: Union Minister of State, Chemicals and Fertilizers
- 30 September 2000 - 29 January 2003: Union Minister of State, Information and Broadcasting
- 29 January 2003 - 8 January 2004: Union Minister of State (Independent Charge), Ministry of Mines
- 9 January 2004 - May 2004 : Union Minister of State (Independent Charge) Ministry of Environment & Forests
- 2004 : Elected to 14th Lok Sabha (5th term)
  - Member, Committee on Petroleum & Natural Gas
  - Member, Committee on Public Accounts
  - Member, Consultative Committee, Ministry of Power
  - Member, Hindi Salahakar Samiti, Ministry of Coal and Mines
- 5 August 2007 onwards : Member, Committee on Petroleum & Natural Gas
- 1 May 2008 : Member, Committee on Public Undertakings
- 2009 : Elected to 15th Lok Sabha (6th term)
- 2009-2014 : Chief whip in Lok Sabha (BJP)
- 6 August 2009 : Member, Committee on Public Undertakings
- 31 August 2009 : Member, Committee on Petroleum and Natural Gas
- 23 September 2009 : Member, Rules Committee
- 1 May 2010 : Member, Committee on Public Undertakings
- 2014 : Elected to 16th Lok Sabha (7th term)
- Sep. 2014 - May 2019 : Appointed Chairman, Standing Committee on Social Justice & Empowerment

==== Governor ====
- July, 2019 – July 2021 : Appointed the 15th Governor of Tripura
- 14 July 2021 – 12 February 2023 : Appointed the 9th Governor of Jharkhand
- 12 February : Appointed the 20th Governor of Maharashtra by the President of India in February 2023 following the resignation of the preceding governor Bhagat Singh Koshyari.

=== Tenure as governor ===
As the 9th Governor of Jharkhand, Bais had several noticeable tensions with the state government led by Hemant Soren during his tenure. One of the most prominent issues was his failure to disclose the Election Commission's recommendation on Soren's continuation as MLA over a mining case. Bais also criticised the work culture in Jharkhand and flagged law and order as a significant problem. He returned several bills to the state government citing various loopholes, including bills passed by the government under the leadership of Hemant Soren, and the formation of the Tribal Advisory Council. Bais claimed he works according to the Constitution for the betterment of the state and stated that his successor would decide the fate of pending Bills and unfinished issues.

Lok Sabha
Preceded by Keyur Bhushan	Member of Parliament for Raipur; 1989 – 1991	Succeeded by Vidya Charan Shukla
Preceded by Vidya Charan Shukla	Member of Parliament for Raipur; 1996 – 2019	Succeeded by Sunil Kumar Soni
Government offices
Preceded by Kaptan Singh Solanki	Governor of Tripura; 29 July 2019 – 13 July 2021	Succeeded by Satyadev Narayan Arya
Preceded by Draupadi Murmu	Governor of Jharkhand; 14 July 2021 – 17 February 2023	Succeeded by C. P. Radhakrishnan
Preceded by Bhagat Singh Koshyari	Governor of Maharashtra; 18 February 2023 – 30 July 2024	Succeeded by C. P. Radhakrishnan
