= Telibandha railway station =

Railway station Chhattisgarh

Telibandha

General information
- Location: Telibandha, Raipur, Chhattisgarh; India
- Coordinates: 21.2366°N 81.6712°E
- Elevation: 287 metres (942 ft)
- System: Indian Railways station
- Owner: Indian Railways
- Operator: Raipur railway division
- Line: Raipur–Dhamtari branch line
- Platforms: 1
- Tracks: 2
- Connections: Auto stand

Construction
- Structure type: Standard (on ground station)
- Parking: No
- Cycle facilities: No

Other information
- Status: Narrow gauge
- Station code: TBD
- Fare zone: South East Central Railway

Services
Preceding station	Indian Railways	Following station
Raipur City towards ?	South East Central Railway zone Raipur–Dhamtari branch line	Mana (Chhattisgarh) towards ?
Location

Telibandha railway station was a narrow gauge railway station in Raipur district, Chhattisgarh. Its code was TBD. It served Raipur city. The station consisted of one platform. The station lied on the former Raipur–Dhamtari branch line of Bilaspur–Nagpur section.

This narrow gauge section has been closed for all services and the tracks have been removed and the space has been converted to an expressway connecting Raipur Junction railway station and Kendri village near Swami Vivekanand Airport.
