= Indra Kumar Sahu =

Indian politician (born 1967)

Indra Kumar Sahu (born 1967) is an Indian politician from Chhattisgarh. He is an MLA from Abhanpur Assembly constituency in Raipur District. He won the 2023 Chhattisgarh Legislative Assembly election, representing the Bharatiya Janata Party.

== Early life and education ==
Sahu is from Abhanpur, Raipur District, Chhattisgarh. He is the son of late Devsinh Sahu. He completed his B.Com. in 1990 at a college affiliated with Pandit Ravishankar Shukla University, Raipur. His wife is a teacher.

== Career ==
Sahu won from Abhanpur Assembly constituency representing the Bharatiya Janata Party in the 2023 Chhattisgarh Legislative Assembly election. He polled 93,295 votes and defeated his nearest rival, Dhanendra Sahu of the Indian National Congress, by a margin of 15,553 votes.
