= Gogaon =

- city
- Location in Chhattisgarh, India Gogaon (India)
- Coordinates: 21.26288°N 81.614647°E
- Country: India
- State: Chhattisgarh
- District: Raipur

Population (2001)
  - Total: 10,453

Languages
  - Official: Hindi, Chhattisgarhi
- Time zone: UTC+5:30 (IST)
- Vehicle registration: CG

Gogaon is a census town in Raipur district in the Indian state of Chhattisgarh.

== Demographics ==
As of the 2001 India census, Gogaon had a population of 10,453. Males constitute 53% of the population and females 47%. Gogaon has an average literacy rate of 56%, lower than the national average of 59.5%: male literacy is 67%, and female literacy is 43%. In Gogaon, 21% of the population is under 6 years of age.
