= Champaran, Chhattisgarh =

Champaran Champaranya
- Village
- Interactive map of Champaran
- Country: India
- State: Chhattisgarh
- District: Raipur

Government
  - Body: Gram Panchayat

Languages
  - Official: Hindi, Chhattisgarhi
- Time zone: UTC+5:30 (IST)
- PIN: 493885
- Vehicle registration: CG
- Nearest city: Rajim 15 Km south of Champaran
- Lok Sabha constituency: Raipur MP: Brijmohan Agrawal (BJP)
- Vidhan Sabha constituency: Abhanpur MLA: Indra Kumar Sahu (BJP)
- Civic agency: Gram Panchayat

Champaran or Champaranya, formerly known as Champajhar, named after forests of Champa flowers which are extinct from here, is a village in the Raipur District in the state of Chhattisgarh, India, which lies about 60 km from the state capital of Raipur via Arang and 30 km from Mahasamund via Bamhani, Tila.

It is famous because it is the birth place of Vallabhacharya, the reformer and founder of the Vallabh sect.

A temple has been constructed in his honour. Near this is a temple of Champeshwar Mahadeva. There are two Baithaks of Vallabhacharya's Chaurasi Bethak here.

The village is identified with Champaranya forest

== Champaran word derivation ==
The Champaran is derived from the Champa flower. There is a myth that in past Champaran was a forest of Champa Flowers. So, on this myth, the place first named Champajhar (Chmapa+Jhar; Jhar means house) then it named Champaran from Champaranya (its ancient name, meaning forest of Champa Flowers)

== Attractions ==
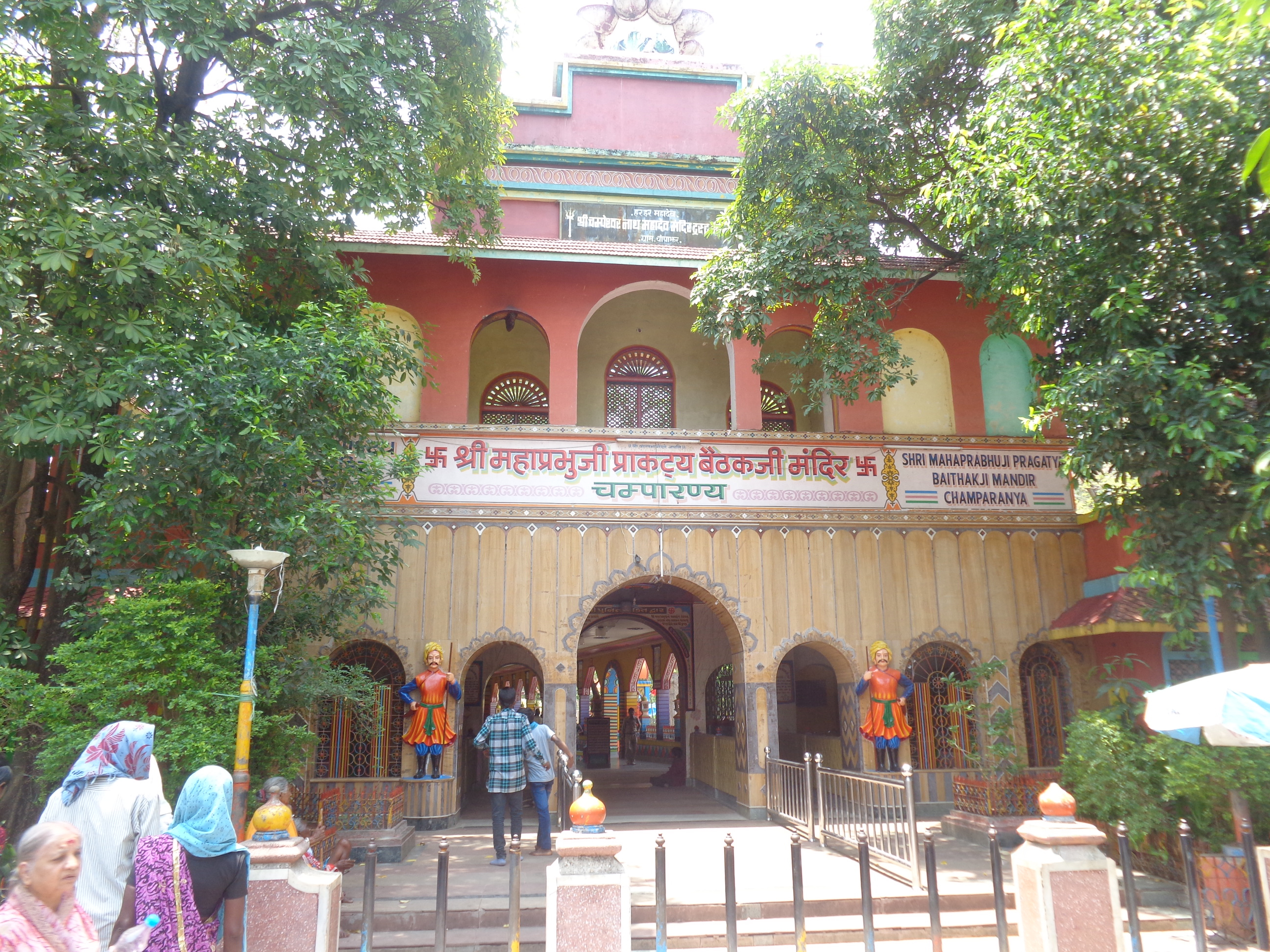
Mahaprabhuji Prakatya Baithakji Mandir, Champaran

There are two temples dedicated to Shri Mahaprabhuji in Champaran. The first one is known as Prakatya Baithakji Mandir, where seva is performed under the guidance of HDH Jagadgūrū Śrimad Vallabhāchārya Prakatya Peeth Gruhadipati Somyājī Dikśit Param Pujya Goswami 108 Śri Dwarkeshlalji Maharajshri, Jagadgūrū Śrimad Vallabhāchārya Prakatya Peeth Yūvrāj HDH Param Pujya Pad Goswami 108 Śri Purshottamlalji Maharajshri and Jagadgūrū Śrimad Vallabhāchārya Prakatya Peeth Kumār HDH Param Pujya Pad Goswami 108 Shri Anugrahkumarji Mahodayaśri. The second Baithakji is Mool Prakatya that is normally known as Chhatti Baithak. In this temple seva is done by Goswami shri Vallabhacharyaji and Shri Raghunathlalji (Shri Pinky Bawa) of 5th house of Kamvan. Apart from this there is a Haveli temple dedicated to Shree Girirajji and Shree Balkrishnalalji that was made by Shri Vrajjivanlalji Maharajśri. A small stream of Mahanadi River flows near the temple which is believed to be a form of Śri Yamunāji and is worshipped. Mahaprabhuji's Prakatya Utsav is celebrated every year on eleventh day of Vaisakh and many of followers of the sect gather at the temple to pay homage. The Annual Fair of Champaran is held with great festivities in the month of Magh every year. Large number of Pushtimargiya Vaishnavs visit Champaran every year. The Champeswar Madadev Temple haves rare shivling which had dedicated to Lord Shiv, Parvati and Ganesh.

== Transport ==
Champaran is accessible from Raipur both via Arang. From the junction of Arang-Rajim Road at the village of Jonda, there is a paved road to Champaran. Buses are available from Raipur and Arang. Nearest Railway Station Is Mahasamund Railway Station
