= Sunil Kumar Soni =

Indian politician

Member of Legislative Assembly, Chhattisgarh
- Incumbent
- Assumed office 23 November 2024
- Preceded by: Brijmohan Agrawal
- Constituency: Raipur South

Member of Parliament, Lok Sabha
- In office 23 May 2019 – 4 June 2024
- Preceded by: Ramesh Bais
- Succeeded by: Brijmohan Agrawal
- Constituency: Raipur

Mayor of Raipur
- In office 5 January 2004 – 5 January 2010
- Preceded by: Tarun Prasad Chatterjee
- Succeeded by: Dr. Kiranmayi Nayak

Personal details
- Born: 28 November 1961 (age 64) Raipur, Madhya Pradesh (Presently Chhattisgarh), India
- Party: Bharatiya Janata Party
- Spouse: Tara Devi Soni

Sunil Kumar Soni (born 28 November 1961) is an Indian politician from Chhattisgarh serving as Member of Chhattisgarh Legislative Assembly from Raipur South. He was elected to the Lok Sabha, lower house of the Parliament of India from Raipur, Chhattisgarh in the 2019 Indian general election as member of the Bharatiya Janata Party.

Previously he served as Mayor & Chairman of Raipur Municipal Corporation. He is also the longest serving Mayor of Raipur for 6 years. He was elected as MLA in 2024 held for Raipur City South.
