= Ajay Chandrakar =

Indian politician

Minister of Parliamentary affairs, Government of Chhattisgarh
- In office 18 December 2013 – 12 December 2018
- Chief Minister: Raman Singh
- Preceded by: Brijmohan Agrawal
- Succeeded by: Ravindra Choubey
- In office 14 December 2003 – 11 December 2008
- Chief Minister: Raman Singh
- Preceded by: Ravindra Choubey
- Succeeded by: Brijmohan Agrawal

Minister of Health, Family Welfare and Medical Education, Government of Chhattisgarh
- In office 22 May 2015 – 12 December 2018
- Chief Minister: Raman Singh
- Preceded by: Amar Agrawal
- Succeeded by: T. S. Singh Deo

Minister of Panchayat and Rural Development, Government of Chhattisgarh
- In office 18 December 2013 – 12 December 2018
- Chief Minister: Raman Singh
- Preceded by: Ramvichar Netam
- Succeeded by: T. S. Singh Deo
- In office 14 December 2003 – 11 December 2008
- Chief Minister: Raman Singh
- Preceded by: Amitesh Shukla
- Succeeded by: Ramvichar Netam

Minister of Higher & Technical education, Science & Technology, Government of Chhattisgarh
- In office 2004 – 11 December 2008
- Chief Minister: Raman Singh
- Preceded by: Vikram Usendi
- Succeeded by: Hemchand Yadav

Member of Chhattisgarh Legislative Assembly
- Incumbent
- Assumed office 12 December 2013
- Preceded by: Lekhram Sahu
- Constituency: Kurud
- In office 1 November 2000 – 11 December 2008
- Succeeded by: Lekhram Sahu
- Constituency: Kurud

Member of Madhya Pradesh Legislative Assembly
- In office 1 December 1998 – 31 October 2000
- Preceded by: Gurmukh Singh Hora
- Constituency: Kurud

Personal details
- Born: 24 June 1963 (age 63) Kurud, Chhattisgarh, India
- Party: Bharatiya Janata Party
- Spouse: Pratibha Chandrakar
- Children: Ajay Ranjan Chandrakar
- Education: SBR College; Durga Mahavidyalaya, Raipur
- Website: ajaychandrakar.com

Ajay Chandrakar (born 24 June 1963) is an Indian politician from Chhattisgarh. He is a five time MLA and a former Cabinet Minister in Government of Chhattisgarh. He won the 2023 Chhattisgarh Legislative Assembly election from Kurud Assembly constituency representing the Bharatiya Janata Party.

== Early life and education ==
Chandrakar is from Kurud, Dhamtari District, Chhattisgarh. He is the son of late Kaliram Chandrakar. He completed his graduation from SBR College in Bilaspur. He later did MA in Hindi literature in1986 at Durga Mahavidyalaya, Raipur which is affiliated with Pandit Ravishankar Shukla University. His discontinued his research on plays of Vishnu Prabhakar due to political agitation during his student days.

== Political career ==
Chandrakar started his political life as a student leader. He first became an MLA winning the 1998 Madhya Pradesh Legislative Assembly election representing the Bharatiya Janata Party. He retained the seat for the BJP, in the first election after the formation of the new state. He won the 2003 Chhattisgarh Legislative Assembly election defeating Deepa Sahu of the Indian National Congress by a thin margin of 2,709 votes. Later, he lost the 2008 Assembly election to Lekhram Sahu of Congress but regained the seat and won consecutively three terms in 2013, 2018 and 2023. In 2023, he polled 94,712 votes and defeated his nearest rival, Tarni Neelam Chandrakar of the Indian National Congress, by a margin of 8,090 votes.

In 1987, he even spent 7 days in jail for participating in an agitation. In 2003, he became a part of the Chhattisgarh government as a Panchayat and Rural Development Minister as well as a Minister of Parliamentary Affairs. In 2004, he was also assigned the portfolios of Science and Technology, Technical Education, and Manpower Planning. Later in 2007, he became the minister of higher education.

After he lost the 2008 Assembly election, he was made the head of the State Finance Commission. Later, he served as the party's vice-chairman and official spokesperson.

He regularly conducts Jandarshan programmes and meets people of his constituency.

He has been trying to get Sirpur, a world heritage site tag. He participates in the cultural and literary festivals held in Sirpur annually.

=== President of Chhattisgarh Football Association ===
Chandrakar was unanimously elected as President of Chhattisgarh Football Association in November 2014.
