= Bhopalrao Bissuli =

Indian politician

Bhopalrao Bissuli was an Indian politician from the state of the Madhya Pradesh. In the 1957 Madhya Pradesh Legislative Assembly election he was the Indian National Congress candidate for the Kurud constituency of the undivided Madhya Pradesh Legislative Assembly and won the seat.
