= Bhatapara Assembly constituency =

Legislative Assembly constituency in Chhattisgarh State, India

Coordinates: 21.74°N 81.95°E

Bhatapara
- Constituency No. 46 for the Chhattisgarh Legislative Assembly

Constituency details
- Country: India
- Region: Central India
- State: Chhattisgarh
- District: Baloda Bazar
- Lok Sabha constituency: Raipur
- Established: 2003
- Total electors: 252,829
- Reservation: None

Member of Legislative Assembly
- 6th Chhattisgarh Legislative Assembly
- Incumbent Inder Kumar Sao
- Party: Indian National Congress
- Elected year: 2023

Bhatapara is one of the 90 Legislative Assembly constituencies of Chhattisgarh state in India.

It comprises Bhatapara tehsil and parts of Simga tehsil, in Baloda Bazar district.

== Members of the Legislative Assembly ==
Year	Member	Party
Madhya Pradesh Legislative Assembly
1952 (Bhatapara-Sitapur constituency)	Chakrapani Shukla	Indian National Congress
1952 (Bhatapara-Sitapur constituency)	Bajirao Bihari	Indian National Congress
1957	Chakrapani Shukla	Indian National Congress
1962	Shivlal Mehta	Indian National Congress
1967	Shivlal Mehta	Indian National Congress
1972	Shivlal Mehta	Indian National Congress
1977	Jagdish Prasad Aggarwal	Indian National Congress
1980	Jagdish Prasad Aggarwal	Indian National Congress
1985	Kalawati Shivlal Mehta	Indian National Congress
1990	Shyamachanran Shukla	Indian National Congress
1993	Radheshyam Sharma	Indian National Congress
1998	Shivratan Sharma	Bharatiya Janata Party
Chhattisgarh Legislative Assembly
2003	Chaitram Sahu	Indian National Congress
2008	Chaitram Sahu	Indian National Congress
2013	Shiv Ratan Sharma	Bharatiya Janata Party
2018	Shiv Ratan Sharma	Bharatiya Janata Party
2023	Inder Kumar Sao	Indian National Congress

== Election results ==
=== 2023 ===
Chhattisgarh Legislative Assembly Election, 2023: Bhatapara
Party	Candidate	Votes	%	±%
INC	Inder Kumar Sao	94,066	49.01	+19.93
BJP	Shivratan Sharma	82,750	43.11	+7.30
BSP	Khemdas Tandan	2,411	1.26	
JCC	Jitendra Banjare	2,280	1.19	−24.74
Independent	Rakesh Kumar	2,239	1.17	
NOTA	None of the Above	657	0.34	−0.18
Majority		11,316	5.90	−0.83
Turnout		191,936	75.92	−0.74
INC gain from BJP		Swing		

=== 2018 ===
Chhattisgarh Legislative Assembly Election, 2018: Bhatapara
Party	Candidate	Votes	%	±%
BJP	Shivratan Sharma	63,399	35.81	
INC	Sunil Maheshwari	51,490	29.08	
JCC	Chaitram Sahu	45,907	25.93	
NCP	Murari Mishra	2,269	1.28	
Independent	Mohan Gaikwad	1,963	1.11	
Independent	Narayan Sahu	1,701	0.96	
NOTA	None of the Above	915	0.52	
Majority		11,909	6.73	
Turnout		177,051	76.66	
BJP hold		Swing		

== See also ==
- List of constituencies of the Chhattisgarh Legislative Assembly
- Baloda Bazar district
