= Urla, Raipur =

Urla
- Census town
- Location in Chhattisgarh, India Urla (India)
- Coordinates: 21.31082°N 81.60237°E
- Country: India
- State: Chhattisgarh
- District: Raipur

Population (2001)
  - Total: 9,359

Languages
  - Official: Hindi, Chhattisgarhi
- Time zone: UTC+5:30 (IST)
- Vehicle registration: CG

Urla is a census town in Raipur District in the Indian state of Chhattisgarh.

== Demographics ==
As of the 2001 Indian census, Urla had a population of 9359, with males constituting 55% of the population and females 45%. Urla has an average literacy rate of 55%, lower than the national average of 59.5%. Male literacy is 66% and female literacy is 41%. 22% of the population is under 6 years of age.
