= Raipur City South Assembly constituency =

Legislative Assembly constituency in Chhattisgarh State, India

Coordinates: 21.21°N 81.68°E

Raipur Nagar Dakshin
- Constituency No. 51 for the Chhattisgarh Legislative Assembly

Constituency details
- Country: India
- Region: Central India
- State: Chhattisgarh
- District: Raipur
- Lok Sabha constituency: Raipur
- Established: 2008
- Total electors: 260,006
- Reservation: None

Member of Legislative Assembly
- 6th Chhattisgarh Legislative Assembly
- Incumbent Sunil Kumar Soni
- Party: Bharatiya Janata Party
- Elected year: 2024

Raipur City South Legislative Assembly constituency officially, Raipur Nagar Dakshin is one of the 90 Legislative Assembly constituencies of Chhattisgarh state in India. The seat was formed in 2008 after the dissolution of Raipur Town constituency. It is part of Raipur district. Former Minister of Chhattisgarh Government Brijmohan Agrawal has been the Member of Vidhansabha from 2008 to 2024. He has won four times from this seat only. Sunil Soni became MLA from this seat after 2024 by-election.

== Members of the Legislative Assembly ==
Year	Member	Party
Until 2008: Constituency did not exist see Raipur Town
2008	Brijmohan Agrawal	Bharatiya Janata Party
2013	Brijmohan Agrawal	Bharatiya Janata Party
2018	Brijmohan Agrawal	Bharatiya Janata Party
2023	Brijmohan Agrawal	Bharatiya Janata Party
2024	Sunil Kumar Soni	Bharatiya Janata Party

== Election results ==
=== 2024 ===
2024 by-election: Raipur City South
Party	Candidate	Votes	%	±%
BJP	Sunil Kumar Soni	89,220	65.03	▼4.45
INC	Akash Sharma	43,053	31.38	▲4.96
NOTA	None of the Above	1,147	0.84	▲0.38
Majority		46,167	33.65	▼9.13
Turnout		1,37,195	50.50	▼9.98
BJP hold		Swing	▼4.45	

=== 2023 ===
2023 Chhattisgarh Legislative Assembly election: Raipur City South
Party	Candidate	Votes	%	±%
BJP	Brijmohan Agrawal	109,263	69.48	+16.48
INC	Mahant Ramsundar Das	41,544	26.42	−14.39
JCC	Pradeep Kumar Sahu	1,612	1.03	
NOTA	None of the Above	729	0.46	−0.57
Majority		67,719	43.06	+31.17
Turnout		1,57,263	60.48	−1.18
BJP hold		Swing	+16.48	

=== 2018 ===
2018 Chhattisgarh Legislative Assembly election: Raipur City South
Party	Candidate	Votes	%	±%
BJP	Brijmohan Agrawal	77,589	52.70	−6.55
INC	Kanhaiya Agrawal	60,093	40.81	+6.88
BSP	Umesh Das Manikpuri	1,514	1.03	
AAP	Munna Bisen	1,363	0.93	
NOTA	None of the Above	1,521	1.03	
Majority		17,496	11.89	
Turnout		147,228	61.66	
BJP hold		Swing	-6.55	

=== 2013 ===
2013 Chhattisgarh Legislative Assembly election: Raipur City South
Party	Candidate	Votes	%	±%
BJP	Brijmohan Agrawal	81,429	60.2	+2.29
INC	Kiranmayee Nayak	46,630	34.5	−1.42
Majority				
Turnout				
BJP hold		Swing	+0.95	

=== 2008 ===
2008 Chhattisgarh Legislative Assembly election: Raipur City South
Party	Candidate	Votes	%	±%
BJP	Brijmohan Agrawal	65,686	57.91	NA
INC	Yogesh Tiwari	40,747	35.92	NA
Majority				NA
Turnout				NA
BJP win (new seat)				

== See also ==
- List of constituencies of the Chhattisgarh Legislative Assembly
- Raipur district
