= Keyur Bhushan =

Indian politician

Member of Parliament, Lok Sabha
- In office 18 January 1980 — 31 November 1989
- Preceded by: Purushottam Kaushik
- Succeeded by: Ramesh Bais
- Constituency: Raipur, Madhya Pradesh

Personal details
- Born: 25 February 1928 Jata Village, Durg district, British India (now Chhattisgarh)
- Party: Indian National Congress
- Spouse: Surya Kumari

Keyur Bhushan (1928-2018) was an Indian politician. He was elected to the Lok Sabha, the lower house of the Parliament of India from Raipur, in Madhya Pradesh, as a member of the Indian National Congress, in 1980 and 1984.
