= Shivdulare =

Indian politician

Shivdulare was an Indian politician from the state of the Madhya Pradesh. He represented the Bilaspur Vidhan Sabha constituency of the undivided Madhya Pradesh Legislative Assembly by winning General election of 1957.
