= Myagdi 1 =

Parliamentary constituency of Nepal

- Parliamentary constituency for the House of Representatives
- Myagdi 1in Gandaki Province

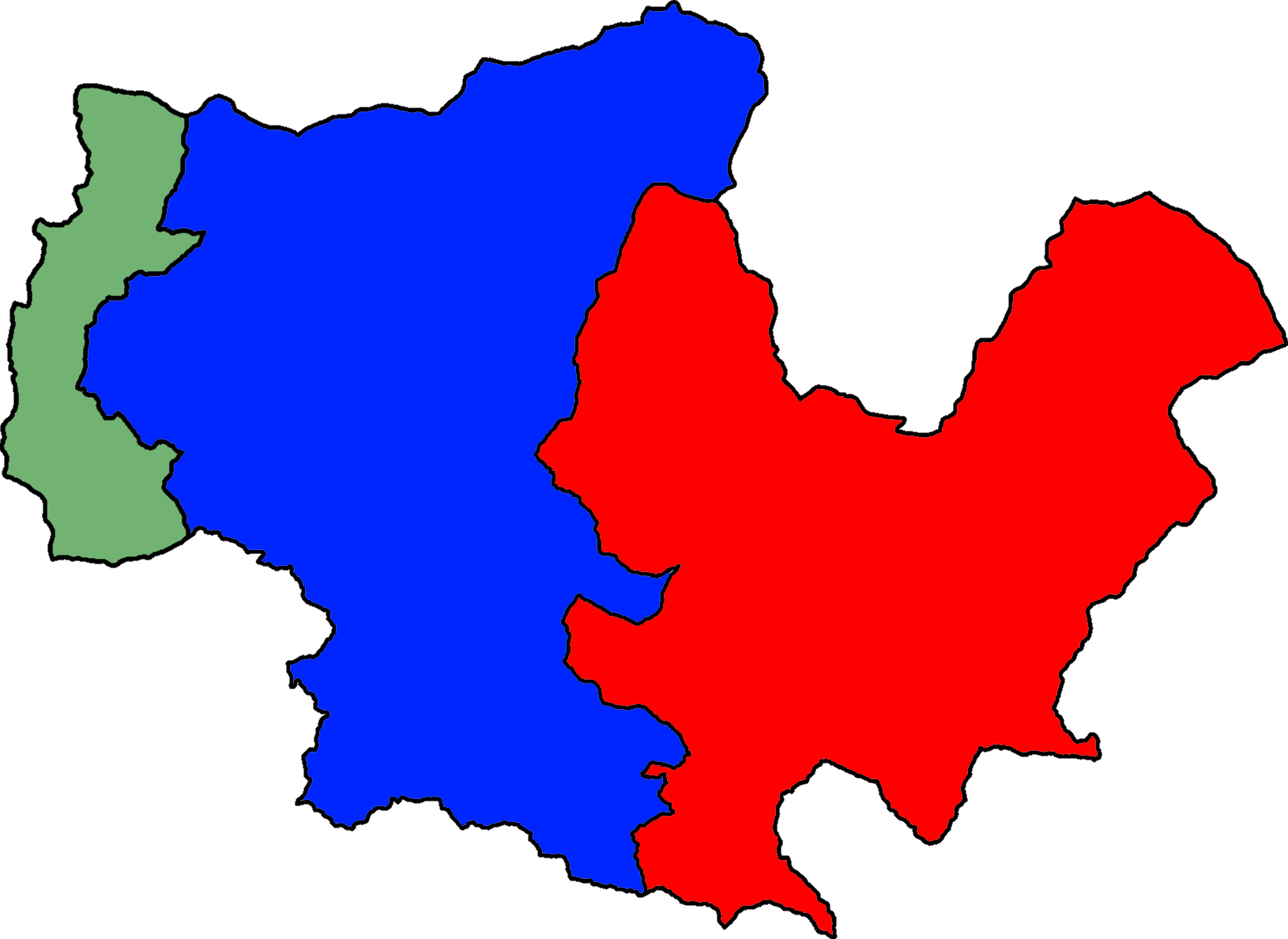
- Assembly segments Myagdi 1(A) and Myagdi 1(B) within Myagdi District
- Province: Gandaki Province
- District: Myagdi District
- Electorate: 75,537

Current constituency
- Created: 1991
- Party: Independent
- MP: Mahabir Pun
- Gandaki MPA 1(A): Binod K.C. (NCP)
- Gandaki MPA 1(B): Nar Devi Pun (NCP)

Myagdi 1 is the parliamentary constituency of Myagdi District in Nepal. This constituency came into existence on the Constituency Delimitation Commission (CDC) report submitted on 31 August 2017.

== Incorporated areas ==
Myagdi 1 incorporates the entirety of Myagdi District.

== Assembly segments ==
It encompasses the following Gandaki Provincial Assembly segment

- Myagdi 1(A)
- Myagdi 1(B)

== Members of Parliament ==
=== Parliament/Constituent Assembly ===
Election	Member	Party
1991	Tham Maya Thapa	CPN (Unified Marxist–Leninist)
1994	Nil Bahadur Tilija	CPN (Unified Marxist–Leninist)
1999	Narayan Singh Pun	Nepali Congress
2008	Govinda Paudel	CPN (Maoist)
January 2009	Govinda Paudel	UCPN (Maoist)
2013	Nawaraj Sharma	CPN (Unified Marxist–Leninist)
2017	Bhupendra Bahadur Thapa	CPN (Unified Marxist–Leninist)
May 2018	Bhupendra Bahadur Thapa	Nepal Communist Party
March 2021	Bhupendra Bahadur Thapa	CPN (Unified Marxist–Leninist)
2022	Kham Bahadur Garbuja	Nepali Congress
2026	Mahabir Pun	Independent

=== Provincial Assembly ===
==== 1(A) ====
Election	Member	Party
2017	Binod K.C.	CPN (Maoist Centre)
May 2018	Binod K.C.	Nepal Communist Party

==== 1(B) ====
Election	Member	Party
2017	Nar Devi Pun	CPN (Unified Marxist-Leninist)
May 2018	Nar Devi Pun	Nepal Communist Party

== Election results ==
=== Election in the 2020s ===
==== 2026 general election ====
Candidate	Party	Votes	%	+/–
Mahabir Pun	Independent politician	22,850	52.94	New
Harikrishna Shrestha	CPN (UML)	7,919	18.35	–24.05
Karna Bahadur Bhandari	Nepali Congress	6,676	15.47	New
Arjun Bahadur Thapa	Nepali Communist Party	3,529	8.18	New
Yubaraj Rokka	Rastriya Swatantra Party	1,530	3.54	New
Others		656	1.52	–2.64
Total		43,160	100.00	–
Majority		14,931		
Independent politician gain				

==== 2022 general election ====
Candidate	Party	Votes	%
Kham Bahadur Garbuja	Nepali Congress	24,021	50.45
Hari Krishna Shrestha	CPN (UML)	20,189	42.40
Hari Bahadur Khatri Chhetri	Rastriya Swatantra Party	1,424	2.99
Others		1,980	4.16
Total		47,614	100.00
Majority		3,832	
Nepali Congress gain			

==== 2022 provincial election ====
===== 1(A) =====
Candidate	Party	Votes	%
Hari Bahadur Bhandari	CPN (Maoist Centre)	12,740	45.91
Devendra Bahadur Katuwal Chhetri	CPN (UML)	11,765	42.40
Prabin Shahi	Rastriya Prajatantra Party	2,049	7.38
Dipak Pun	Mongol National Organisation	1,073	3.87
Others	122	0.44	
Total		27,749	100.00
Majority		975	
CPN (Maoist Centre)			

===== 1(B) =====
Candidate	Party	Votes	%
Resham Bahadur Jugjali	CPN (Maoist Centre)	9,454	46.64
Yam Bahadur Garbuja	CPN (UML)	9,353	46.15
Others	1,461	7.21	
Total		20,268	100.00
Majority		101	
CPN (Maoist Centre)			

=== Election in the 2010s ===
==== 2017 legislative elections ====
Party	Candidate	Votes
CPN (Unified Marxist–Leninist)	Bhupendra Bahadur Thapa	23,308
Nepali Congress	Kham Bahadur Garbuja	20,980
Others		691
Invalid votes		3,831
Result	CPN (UML) hold	
Source: Election Commission

==== 2017 Nepalese provincial elections ====
===== 1(A) =====
Party	Candidate	Votes
Communist Party of Nepal (Maoist Centre)	Binod K.C.	14,704
Rastriya Prajatantra Party	Bhim Prasad Gauchan	12,175
Invalid votes		705
Result	Maoist Centre gain	
Source: Election Commission

===== 1(B) =====
Party	Candidate	Votes
CPN (Unified Marxist–Leninist)	Nar Devi Pun	10,868
Nepali Congress	Am Lal Fagami Pun	7,990
Others		92
Invalid votes		775
Result	CPN (UML) gain	
Source: Election Commission

==== 2013 Constituent Assembly election ====
Party	Candidate	Votes
CPN (Unified Marxist–Leninist)	Nawaraj Sharma	15,955
Nepali Congress	Kham Bahadur Garjuwa	12,509
UCPN (Maoist)	Lokendra Bista Magar	6,450
Rastriya Prajatantra Party	Bhim Prasad Gauchan	3,334
Others		1,818
Result	CPN (UML) gain	
Source: NepalNews

=== Election in the 2000s ===
==== 2008 Constituent Assembly election ====
Party	Candidate	Votes
CPN (Maoist)	Govinda Paudel	23,102
CPN (Unified Marxist–Leninist)	Nar Devi Pun	14,453
Nepali Congress	Resham Bahadur Baniya	7,626
Rastriya Prajatantra Party	Lok Bahadur Malla	1,161
Others		2,516
Invalid votes		1,266
Result	Maoist gain	
Source: Election Commission

=== Election in the 1990s ===
==== 1999 legislative elections ====
Party	Candidate	Votes
Nepali Congress	Narayan Singh Pun	16,984
CPN (Unified Marxist–Leninist)	Nar Devi Pun	12,196
Rastriya Prajatantra Party	Jagat Prasad Gauchan	10,155
CPN (Marxist–Leninist)	Nil Bahadur Tilija	2,979
Others		1,195
Invalid Votes		3,657
Result	Congress gain	
Source: Election Commission

==== 1994 legislative elections ====
Party	Candidate	Votes
CPN (Unified Marxist–Leninist)	Nil Bahadur Tilija	15,486
Rastriya Prajatantra Party	Bhim Prasad Gauchan	11,961
Nepali Congress	Gopal Narayan Bhattachan	10,430
Independent	Laxman Pun	174
Result	CPN (UML) hold	
Source: Election Commission

==== 1991 legislative elections ====
Party	Candidate	Votes
CPN (Unified Marxist–Leninist)	Tham Maya Thapa	10,748
Nepali Congress		7,190
Result	CPN (UML)	

== See also ==
- List of parliamentary constituencies of Nepal
