= Tilda Newra =

Tilda-Neora
- City
- Nickname: Tilda
- Location in Chhattisgarh, India Tilda-Neora (India)
- Coordinates: 21.5500°N 81.7833°E
- Country: India
- State: Chhattisgarh
- District: Raipur

Population (2011)
  - Total: 32,331

Languages
  - Official: Hindi, Chhattisgarhi
- Time zone: UTC+5:30 (IST)
- Postal code: 493114
- Vehicle registration: CG

Tilda Neora is a city and a major industrial area located in the Indian state of Chhattisgarh.The city is known for its rice production and exports, which contribute significantly to the region’s agricultural economy. It is surrounded by numerous rice mills and several major industrial establishments, including the Ultratech Cement Factory and the Adani Power Plant.

Tilda Neora is well connected by both rail and road networks. The Tilda Neora railway station serves as an important rail junction in the region, with approximately 52 trains halting there daily. The station currently has four platforms and is undergoing redevelopment to enhance passenger amenities and infrastructure. It is recognized as the eighth-largest railway station in Chhattisgarh in terms of train halts.

State Highway 20 (SH 20) passes through Tilda Neora, while the nearest national highway is located approximately 14 kilometres away, ensuring connectivity to other parts of the state and neighbouring regions.

Tilda Neora may become a separate district in the near future due to its rapidly growing industrial, economic, and infrastructural importance. The city has witnessed continuous development in recent years, and administrative discussions have reportedly considered its potential as a new district headquarters to improve governance and regional management.

== Demographics ==
As of 2001 India census, Tilda-Neora had a population of 26,637. Males constitute 51% of the population and females 49%. Tilda-Neora has an average literacy rate of 63%, higher than the national average of 59.5%: male literacy is 72%, and female literacy is 53%. In Tilda-Neora, 16% of the population is under 6 years of age. Tilda-Neora also famous as a wholesaler of cloth and kirana, and for several rice mills. Tons of rice is exported from here to Africa and other countries. Tilda-Neora is surrounded with more than four cement factories, century cement being the nearest.

== Transport ==
Tilda Neora railway station is well connected by railways and roadways. It is the main station between Raipur and Bilaspur on Howrah−Mumbai Line.
