= Bhupendra Nath Misra =

Indian politician (born 1918)

Bhupendra Nath Mishra

Member of Parliament, Lok Sabha
- In office 1952-1957
- Succeeded by: Minimata Agam Dass Guru
- Constituency: Raipur, Madhya Pradesh

Personal details
- Born: 5 April 1918
- Party: Indian National Congress
- Spouse: Tara Devi Misra
- Children: Anand Mishra, Kalyan Mishra
- Education: Benaras Hindu University, Raipur Law College, Christian College Indore

Bhupendra Nath Mishra (born 5 April 1918, date of death unknown) was an Indian politician, pleader and landlord. He was elected to the Lok Sabha, the lower house of the Parliament of India from Raipur, Madhya Pradesh as a member of the Indian National Congress.
