= Kurud Assembly constituency =

Legislative Assembly constituency in Chhattisgarh State, India

Coordinates: 20.83°N 81.71°E

Kurud
- Constituency No. 57 for the Chhattisgarh Legislative Assembly

Constituency details
- Country: India
- Region: Central India
- State: Chhattisgarh
- District: Dhamtari
- Lok Sabha constituency: Mahasamund
- Established: 1957
- Total electors: 208,888
- Reservation: None

Member of Legislative Assembly
- 6th Chhattisgarh Legislative Assembly
- Incumbent Ajay Chandrakar
- Party: Bharatiya Janata Party
- Elected year: 2023
- Preceded by: Lekhram Sahu

Kurud is one of the 90 Legislative Assembly constituencies of Chhattisgarh state in India.

It is part of Dhamtari district.

== Members of the Legislative Assembly ==
Year	Member	Party
Madhya Pradesh Legislative Assembly
1952	Bhopalrao Bissuli	Indian National Congress
1957	Bhopalrao Bissuli	Indian National Congress
1962	Yeshwant Rao Meghawale	Bharatiya Jana Sangh
1967	T. Ramdayal	Indian National Congress
1972	Yeshwant Rao Meghawale	Bharatiya Jana Sangh
1977	Yeshwant Rao Meghawale	Janata Party
1980	Chandrahas	Indian National Congress
1985	Bhuleshwari Deepa Sahu	Indian National Congress
1990	Somprakash Giri	Bharatiya Janata Party
1993	Gurumukh Singh Hora	Indian National Congress
1998	Ajay Chandrakar	Bharatiya Janata Party
Chhattisgarh Legislative Assembly
2003	Ajay Chandrakar	Bharatiya Janata Party
2008	Lekhram Sahu	Indian National Congress
2013	Ajay Chandrakar	Bharatiya Janata Party
2018	Ajay Chandrakar	Bharatiya Janata Party
2023	Ajay Chandrakar	Bharatiya Janata Party

== Election results ==
=== Chhattisgarh ===
==== 2023 ====
2023 Chhattisgarh Legislative Assembly election: Kurud
Party	Candidate	Votes	%	±%
BJP	Ajay Chandrakar	94,712	50.07	+7.80
INC	Tarni Neelam Chandrakar	86,622	45.79	+30.44
Independent	Sanjay Chandrakar	1,845	0.98	
NOTA	None of the Above	2,756	1.46	−0.55
Majority		8,090	4.28	−2.86
Turnout		189,154	90.55	+1.72
BJP hold		Swing		

==== 2018 ====
Chhattisgarh Legislative Assembly Election, 2018: Kurud
Party	Candidate	Votes	%	±%
BJP	Ajay Chandrakar	72,922	42.27	
Independent	Neelam Chandrakar	60,605	35.13	
INC	Laxmikanta Sahu	26,483	15.35	
BSP	Kanhaiya Lal Sahu	2,888	1.67	
NOTA	None of the Above	3,470	2.01	
Majority		12,317	7.14	
Turnout		172,534	88.83	
BJP hold		Swing		

=== Undivided Madhya Pradesh ===
==== 1957 ====
1957 Madhya Pradesh Legislative Assembly election: Kurud
Party	Candidate	Votes	%	±%
INC	Bhopalrao Bissuli	13,049	54.93	
Independent	Ramgopal	6,856	28.86	
AISCF	Mulkoo	2,434	10.25	
PSP	Vidhyabhushan	837	3.52	
Independent	Udailal	579	2.44	
Majority		6,193	26.07	
Turnout		23,755	41.82	
Registered electors		56,800		

== See also ==
- List of constituencies of the Chhattisgarh Legislative Assembly
- Dhamtari district
