= Tham Maya Thapa =

Nepali politician

Honourable Tham Maya Thapa
- थम माया थापा

Minister of Women, Children and Senior Citizens
- In office 15 February 2018 – 20 November 2019
- President: Bidya Devi Bhandari
- Prime Minister: KP Oli
- Preceded by: Birkam Bahadur Thapa
- Succeeded by: Parbat Gurung

Member of Parliament, Pratinidhi Sabha for CPN (UML) party list
- In office 4 March 2018 – 18 September 2022

Member of Constituent Assembly for CPN (UML) party list
- In office 28 May 2008 – 28 May 2012

Member of Parliament, Rastriya Sabha
- In office 10 July 1999 – 27 June 2001

Member of Parliament, Pratinidhi Sabha
- In office May 1991 – August 1994
- Preceded by: Constituency created
- Succeeded by: Nil Bahadur Tilija
- Constituency: Myagdi 1

Personal details
- Born: 7 March 1958 (age 68) Myagdi District
- Party: CPN (UML)

Tham Maya Thapa is a Nepalese politician and the former Minister of Women, Children and Senior Citizens of Nepal.
