= Bilaspur, Chhattisgarh Assembly constituency =

Legislative Assembly constituency in Chhattisgarh State, India

Coordinates: 22.08°N 82.14°E

Bilaspur
- Constituency No. 30 for the Chhattisgarh Legislative Assembly

Constituency details
- Country: India
- Region: Central India
- State: Chhattisgarh
- District: Bilaspur
- Lok Sabha constituency: Bilaspur
- Established: 1951
- Total electors: 251,210
- Reservation: None

Member of Legislative Assembly
- 6th Chhattisgarh Legislative Assembly
- Incumbent Amar Agrawal
- Party: Bharatiya Janata Party
- Elected year: 2023

Bilaspur is one of the 90 Legislative Assembly constituencies of Chhattisgarh state in India.

It is part of Bilaspur district.

== Members of the Legislative Assembly ==
Election	Name	Party
Madhya Pradesh Legislative Assembly
1952	Shivdulare	Indian National Congress
1957	Shivdulare	Indian National Congress
1962	Ramcharan Rai	Indian National Congress
1967	Ramcharan Rai	Indian National Congress
1972	Shridhar Mishra	Indian National Congress
1977	B. R. Yadav	Indian National Congress
1980	B. R. Yadav	Indian National Congress
1985	B. R. Yadav	Indian National Congress
1990	Moolchand Khandelwal	Bharatiya Janata Party
1993	B. R. Yadav	Indian National Congress
1998	Amar Agrawal	Bharatiya Janata Party
Chhattisgarh Legislative Assembly
2003	Amar Agrawal	Bharatiya Janata Party
2008	Amar Agrawal	Bharatiya Janata Party
2013	Amar Agrawal	Bharatiya Janata Party
2018	Sailesh Pandey	Indian National Congress
2023	Amar Agrawal	Bharatiya Janata Party

== Election results ==
=== 2023 ===
Chhattisgarh Legislative Assembly Election, 2023: Bilaspur
Party	Candidate	Votes	%	±%
BJP	Amar Agrawal	83,022	57.94	+15.72
INC	Sailesh Pandey	54,063	37.73	−12.84
AAP	Ujwala Karade	1,801	1.26	New
NOTA	None of the Above	866	0.60	−0.26
Majority		28,959	20.21	+11.86
Turnout		143,300	57.04	−4.55
BJP gain from INC		Swing		

=== 2018 ===
Chhattisgarh Legislative Assembly Election, 2018: Bilaspur
Party	Candidate	Votes	%	±%
INC	Sailesh Pandey	67,896	50.57	
BJP	Amar Agrawal	56,675	42.22	
JCC	Brijesh Sahu	3,641	2.71	
NOTA	None of the Above	1153	0.86	
Majority		11,221	8.35	
Turnout		134251	61.59	
INC gain from BJP		Swing		

== See also ==
- List of constituencies of the Chhattisgarh Legislative Assembly
- Bilaspur district, Chhattisgarh
