= Keshar Kumari Devi =

Indian politician

Member of Parliament, Lok Sabha
- In office 1957–1962
- Preceded by: Shyamkumari Devi
- Constituency: Raipur

Personal details
- Party: Indian National Congress

Keshar Kumari Devi is an Indian politician. She was elected to the Lok Sabha, lower house of the Parliament of India from Raipur as member of the Indian National Congress.
