= Bhupendra Nath Kaushik =

Hindu and Urdu poet and satirist (1924 - 2007)

Bhupendra Nath Kaushik (7 July 1924 – 27 October 2007) was a Hindi and Urdu language poet, writer and satirist.

He was born in Nahan, Himachal Pradesh. He completed basic study in Ambala Cantt Haryana. After that he settled in Jabalpur, Madhya Pradesh and completed an M.A. in English. He was an employee of BSNL. After pursuing writing along with his service for some time, he became well known as an Urdu story writer. But when he was settled in Jabalpur, he did write poetry in Hindi.

He won the "Sahitya Maneeshi alankaran" in 2005 for his satire, "Koltar Mai Aks".

== Major works ==
Urdu poetry

- Maa
- Rahat
- Desh ki jawani
- Bhonk
- Chor

Hindi Poetry

- Naya Prazatantra
- Kutta
- Bhushe Ka Dher
- Yun ud gaya
- Chalo Chal chalain
