= Mandirhasod Assembly constituency =

Constituency of the Chhattisgarh legislative assembly in India

Mandirhasod
- Former constituency for the Chhattisgarh Legislative Assembly

Constituency details
- Country: India
- Region: Central India
- State: Chhattisgarh
- Established: 2003
- Abolished: 2008
- Total electors: 82,127

Mandirhasod Assembly constituency was an assembly constituency in the India state of Chhattisgarh.

== Members of the Legislative Assembly ==
Election	Member	Party
2003	Satyanarayan Sharma	Indian National Congress

== Election results ==
=== Assembly Election 2003 ===
2003 Chhattisgarh Legislative Assembly election : Mandirhasod
Party	Candidate	Votes	%	±%
INC	Satyanarayan Sharma	27,009	41.83%	New
BJP	Sobharam Yadav	25,182	39.00%	New
NCP	Pramod Tiwari	5,680	8.80%	New
Independent	Santosh Markandeya	3,110	4.82%	New
ABHM	Siyaram Dhritlahare	896	1.39%	New
Independent	Manoj Kumar Khemani	746	1.16%	New
Independent	Radheshyam	710	1.10%	New
Margin of victory		1,827	2.83%	
Turnout		64,563	78.63%	
Registered electors		82,127		
INC win (new seat)				
