= Lakhanlal Gupta =

Indian politician

Lakhan Lal Gupta

Member of Parliament, Lok Sabha
- In office 1967-1971
- Preceded by: Shyamkumari Devi
- Succeeded by: Vidya Charan Shukla
- Constituency: Raipur, Madhya Pradesh

Personal details
- Born: 13 May 1913 Arang, Central Provinces, British India ( Now Chhattisgarh)
- Party: Indian National Congress
- Spouse: Dayavati Devi Gupta

Lakhanlal Gupta was an Indian politician from the state of the Madhya Pradesh. He represented Arang Vidhan Sabha constituency of undivided Madhya Pradesh Legislative Assembly by winning General election of 1951 and 1957. He was elected to the Lok Sabha, the lower house of the Parliament of India from Raipur, Madhya Pradesh as a member of the Indian National Congress.
