= Rajesh Munat =

Indian politician (born 1963)

Minister of Public Works Department, Government of Chhattisgarh
- In office 9 December 2013 – 11 December 2018
- Preceded by: Brijmohan Agrawal
- Succeeded by: Tamradhwaj Sahu
- In office 9 December 2003 – 11 December 2008
- Preceded by: Tarun Chatterjee
- Succeeded by: Brijmohan Agrawal

Minister of Transport, Government of Chhattisgarh
- In office 9 December 2008 – 11 December 2018
- Preceded by: Hemchand Yadav
- Succeeded by: Mohammad Akbar

Minister of Housing and Environment, Government of Chhattisgarh
- In office 9 December 2008 – 11 December 2018
- Succeeded by: Mohammad Akbar

Minister of Urban Administration, Government of Chhattisgarh
- In office 9 December 2008 – 11 December 2013
- Preceded by: Amar Agrawal
- Succeeded by: Amar Agrawal

Member of Chhattisgarh Legislative Assembly
- Incumbent
- Assumed office 3 December 2023
- Preceded by: Vikas Upadhyay
- Constituency: Raipur City West
- In office 2008–2018
- Preceded by: Constituency Established
- Succeeded by: Vikas Upadhyay
- Constituency: Raipur City West
- In office 2003–2008
- Preceded by: Tarun Chatterjee
- Succeeded by: Nand Kumar Sahu
- Constituency: Raipur Rural

Personal details
- Born: 28 April 1963 (age 63) Mahasamund, Madhya Pradesh, India
- Party: Bharatiya Janata Party
- Spouse: Sadhana Munat
- Children: Roshni Munat, Ravish Munat
- Website: rajeshmunat.in

Rajesh Munat (born 28 April 1963) is an Indian politician and former PWD and cabinet minister of Government of Chhattisgarh. He is a member of Bharatiya Janata Party.

== Political career ==
Munat was elected to Vidhan Sabha in 2003 by defeating then PWD minister Tarun Chatterjee by a margin of 38,000 votes and became PWD minister in Raman Singh's Cabinet. He got an additional charge from the Ministry of School Education. After winning 2008 Assembly election, he became Minister of Urban Administration, Transport and Housing. Again, he remained Minister of Transport and Housing along with PWD from year 2013 to 2019.
