= Khairjhiti =

Khairjhiti (or Kharjiti) is a village in the state of Chhattisgarh in India. Agriculture is the main economic activity. Mungeli is the nearest town.
