= Raipur City West Assembly constituency =

Legislative Assembly constituency in Chhattisgarh State, India

Coordinates: 21.252°N 81.561°E

Raipur Nagar Paschim
- Constituency No. 49 for the Chhattisgarh Legislative Assembly

Constituency details
- Country: India
- Region: Central India
- State: Chhattisgarh
- District: Raipur
- Lok Sabha constituency: Raipur
- Established: 2008
- Total electors: 291,591
- Reservation: None

Member of Legislative Assembly
- 6th Chhattisgarh Legislative Assembly
- Incumbent Rajesh Munat
- Party: Bharatiya Janata Party
- Elected year: 2023
- Preceded by: Vikas Upadhyay

Raipur West also known as Raipur Nagar Paschim Vidhan Sabha constituency is one of the 90 Vidhan Sabha (Legislative Assembly) constituencies of Chhattisgarh state in central India. The seat was formed after the demolition of Raipur Town Vidhan Sabha Constituency in 2008. It is a segment of Raipur (Lok Sabha constituency). It is part of Raipur district.

== Members of Vidhan Sabha ==
Year	Member	Party
Prior to 2008: Constituency does not exist
2008	Rajesh Munat	Bharatiya Janata Party
2013	Rajesh Munat	Bharatiya Janata Party
2018	Vikas Upadhyay	Indian National Congress
2023	Rajesh Munat	Bharatiya Janata Party

== Election results ==
=== 2023 ===
Chhattisgarh Legislative Assembly Election, 2023: Raipur City West
Party	Candidate	Votes	%	±%
BJP	Rajesh Munat	98,938	60.35	+17.62
INC	Vikas Upadhyay	57,709	35.20	−15.66
NOTA	None of the Above	761	0.46	−0.06
Majority		44,343	25.15	+17.02
Turnout		163,943	56.22	−4.23
BJP gain from INC		Swing		

=== 2018 ===
Chhattisgarh Legislative Assembly Election, 2018: Raipur City (West)
Party	Candidate	Votes	%	±%
INC	Vikas Upadhyay	76,359	50.86	
BJP	Rajesh Munat	64,147	42.73	
BSP	Bhojraj Gaurkhede	2,271	1.51	
NOTA	None of the Above	779	0.52	
Majority		12,212	8.13	
Turnout		150,122	60.45	
INC gain from BJP		Swing		

=== 2013 Election ===
- Rajesh Munat (BJP) : 64,611 votes
- Vikas Upadhyay (INC) : 58,451

=== 2003 Election ===
- Brijmohan Agrawal (BJP) : 70,164 votes
- Gajraj Pagariya (INC) : 44190

=== 1977 Election ===
- Rajani D. P. Upasane (JNP) : 17,925 votes
- Sharda Charah Raghubar Prasad (INC) : 13065

=== 1972 Election ===
- Sudhir mukherji (IND) : 30,347 votes
- Mansukh Lal S Chandeel (Jana Sangh) : 16882

== See also ==
- Raipur
- List of constituencies of the Chhattisgarh Legislative Assembly
