= Bhupendra Bahadur Thapa =

Nepalese Politician

- भुपेन्द्र बहादुर थापा

Member of Parliament, Pratinidhi Sabha
- In office 4 March 2018 – 18 September 2022
- Preceded by: Nawaraj Sharma
- Constituency: Myagdi 1

Personal details
- Born: April 29, 1967 (age 59) Myagdi District
- Party: CPN (UML)

Bhupendra Bahadur Thapa is a Nepalese politician who served as the Member Of House Of Representatives (Nepal) elected from Myagdi, Province No. 4. He is the member of the Presidium of Nepal Communist Party.
