= Amar Agrawal =

Indian politician

Minister of Commercial Taxes, Government of Chhattisgarh
- In office December 2003 – 11 December 2018
- Chief Minister: Raman Singh
- Preceded by: Ramchandra Sigh Dev
- Succeeded by: Kawasi Lakhma

Minister of Urban Administration, Government of Chhattisgarh
- In office December 2013 – December 2018
- Chief Minister: Raman Singh
- Preceded by: Rajesh Munat
- Succeeded by: Shiv Kumar Dahariya
- In office December 2003 – December 2008
- Chief Minister: Raman Singh
- Preceded by: Ravindra Chaubey
- Succeeded by: Rajesh Munat

Minister of Labour, Government of Chhattisgarh
- In office December 2008 – 22 May 2015
- Chief Minister: Raman Singh
- Preceded by: Hemchand Yadav
- Succeeded by: Bhaiyalal Rajwade

Minister of Health, Family Welfare and Medical Education, Government of Chhattisgarh
- In office 2007 – 22 May 2015
- Chief Minister: Raman Singh
- Preceded by: Dr. Krishnamurti Bandhi
- Succeeded by: Ajay Chandrakar

Minister of Revenue, Disaster Management and Rehabilitation, Government of Chhattisgarh
- In office 8 December 2008 – 9 December 2013
- Chief Minister: Raman Singh
- Preceded by: Brijmohan Agrawal
- Succeeded by: Prem Prakash Pandey

Minister of Finance, Government of Chhattisgarh
- In office 2003–2007
- Chief Minister: Raman Singh
- Preceded by: Ramchandra Singh Deo
- Succeeded by: Raman Singh (Chief Minister)

Member of Chhattisgarh Legislative Assembly
- Incumbent
- Assumed office 3 December 2023
- Preceded by: Shailesh Pandey
- Constituency: Bilaspur
- In office 2000–2018
- Succeeded by: Shailesh Pandey
- Constituency: Bilaspur

Member of Madhya Pradesh Legislative Assembly
- In office 1998–2000
- Preceded by: B.R. Yadav
- Constituency: Bilaspur

Personal details
- Born: 22 September 1963 (age 62) Raigarh, Madhya Pradesh (now in Chhattisgarh), India
- Party: Bharatiya Janata Party
- Spouse: Shashikala Agrawal
- Children: 3
- Education: C.M. Dubey Postgraduate College, Bilaspur; Durga Mahavidyalaya, Raipur
- Website: amaragrwal.in

Amar Agrawal (born 22 September 1963) is an Indian politician and former Cabinet Minister of Government of Chhattisgarh. He is a member of Bharatiya Janata Party.

Agrawal represented Bilaspur in the Madhya Pradesh assembly (later Chhattisgarh assembly) from 1998 to 2018. After his victory in the 2013 Assembly elections, Agrawal represented his constituency for the third successive tenure as Minister of Health and Medical Education in the Legislature Assembly of Chhattisgarh. There are a number of schemes and projects in which he is involved such as 108 Sanjeevani Express, 102 Mahtari Express, 104 Medical Consultation and Online Jan Shikayat Kendra.

== Political career ==
In 1998, Agrawal contested 1998 assembly election from Bilaspur Assembly constituency and won by margin of 10,995 votes. After creation of Chhattisgarh out of Madhya Pradesh, he won 2003 Chhattisgarh Assembly election from same constituency and became Cabinet Minister in Raman Singh's Ministry and retained his constituency till 2018.

Agrawal held various portfolios such as Finance, Health and family welfare, commercial tax, revenue during his tenure from 2003 to 2018.

In 2023, he regained his seat from Bilaspur.
