= Inder Kumar Sao =

Indian politician (born 1967)

Member of Chhattisgarh Legislative Assembly
- Incumbent
- Assumed office 2023
- Preceded by: Shiv Ratan Sharma
- Constituency: Bhatapara

Personal details
- Party: Indian National Congress
- Profession: Politician

Inder Kumar Sao (born 1967) is an Indian politician from Chhattisgarh. He is an MLA from Bhatapara Assembly constituency in Baloda Bazar District. He won the 2023 Chhattisgarh Legislative Assembly election, representing the Indian National Congress.

== Early life and education ==
Kumar Sao is from Bhatapara, Baloda Bazar District, Chhattisgarh. He is the son of Kaluram Sao. He completed his M.Sc. in 1991 at Government Science College, Raipur.

== Career ==
Kumar Sao won from Bhatapara Assembly constituency representing the Indian National Congress in the 2023 Chhattisgarh Legislative Assembly election. He polled 94,066 votes and defeated his nearest rival and sitting MLA, Shivratan Sharma of the Bharatiya Janata Party, by a margin of 11,316 votes. In February 2024,he skipped the assembly session to stage a protest against the sale of illegal liquor.
