= Dhanendra Sahu =

Indian politician

Member of Chhattisgarh Legislative Assembly
- In office 8 December 2013 – 3 December 2023
- Preceded by: Chandra Shekhar Sahu
- Succeeded by: Indra Kumar Sahu
- In office 1993–2008
- Preceded by: Chandra Shekhar Sahu
- Succeeded by: Chandra Shekhar Sahu
- Constituency: Abhanpur

President of Chhattisgarh Pradesh Congress Committee
- In office 2008–2011
- Preceded by: Charan Das Mahant
- Succeeded by: Nand Kumar Patel

Personal details
- Born: 9 March 1952 (age 74)
- Party: Indian National Congress
- Children: 4 (3 sons, 1 daughter)
- Occupation: Agriculture

Dhanendra Sahu (born 9 March 1952) is an Indian politician. He is a senior leader of Chhattisgarh Congress unit. He is former MLA from Abhanpur. Sahu has been MLA from Abhanpur five times. He was the president of the Chhattisgarh Pradesh Congress Committee from 2008 to 2011.
