= Vikas Upadhyay =

Indian politician

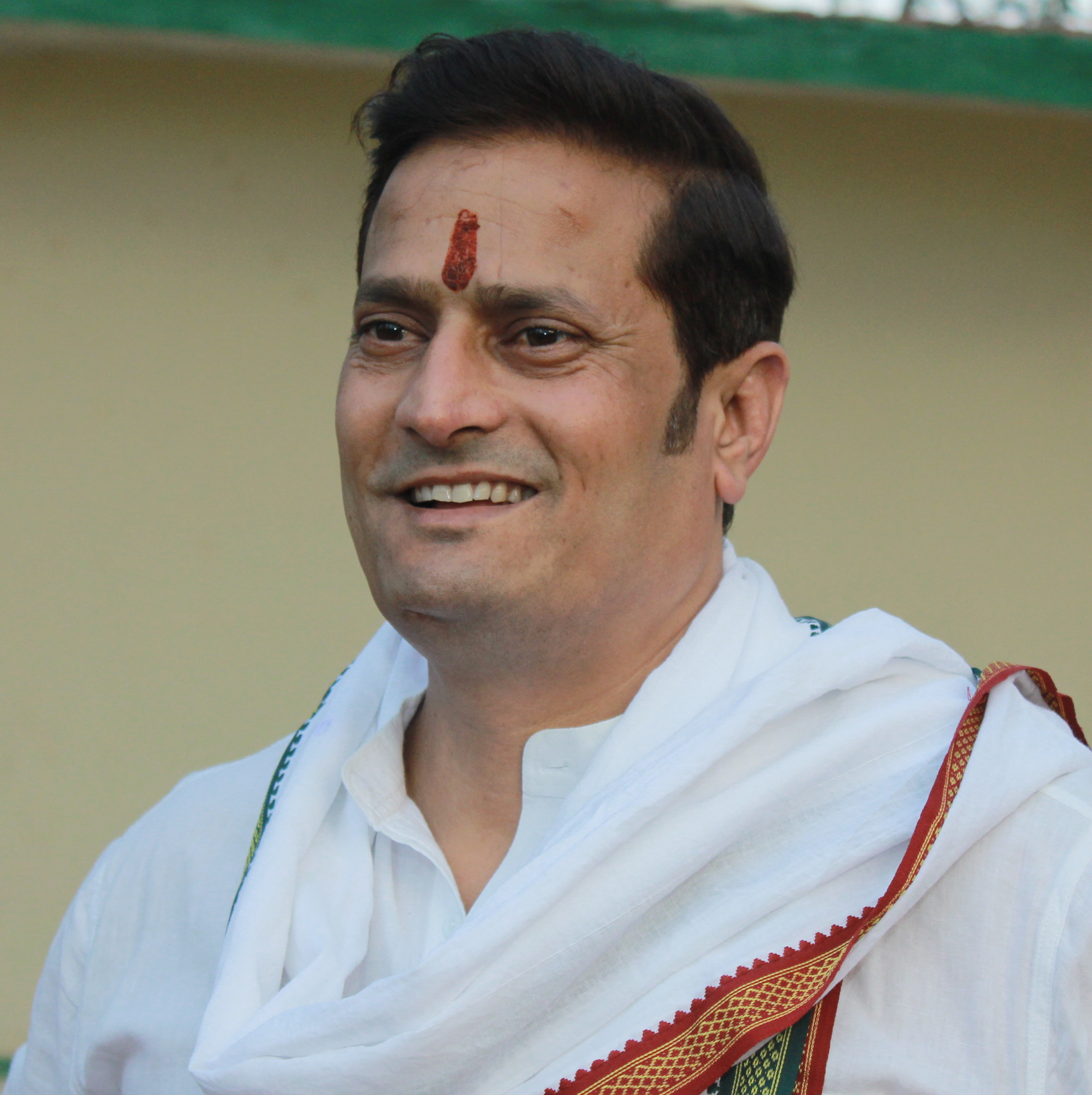

Member of Chhattisgarh Legislative Assembly
- In office 2018–2023
- Preceded by: Rajesh Munat
- Succeeded by: Rajesh Munat
- Constituency: Raipur City West

Personal details
- Born: 5 November 1975 (age 50)
- Party: Indian National Congress

Vikas Upadhyay (born 5 November 1975) is an Indian politician from Chhattisgarh. He is a former Member of Chhattisgarh Legislative Assembly representing Raipur City West.

== Early life ==
He was born to a farmer's family in Raipur, Chhattisgarh, India. He came from a non-political background but was attracted to politics from a young age.

He joined the National Students Union of India (NSUI) during his early days of school in 1994. He became the president of NSUI Block, Raipur, was elected as the president of the College Unit and became the district president NSUI. He joined the National Committee as the Secretary, NSUI. He led the states of Rajasthan, Jammu & Kashmir and Himachal Pradesh. He was elected as the president of the NSUI for the state of Chhattisgarh.

== Political career ==
He was inducted into the Indian Youth Congress national committee as Secretary in 2009, travelling the states of Punjab, Uttar Pradesh, Tripura and the union territory of Chandigarh.

After a year as the Secretary of All India Youth Congress, he was made General Secretary of the All India Youth Congress in April 2010 when Rajiv Satav became the National President of Indian Youth Congress. He then led Delhi, Gujarat, and Daman Diu.
