= Minimata Agam Dass Guru =

Indian politician

Member of Lok Sabha
- In office 1957–1973
- Succeeded by: Manhar Bhagatram
- Constituency: Janjgir-Champa
- In office 1955–1957
- Preceded by: Guru Agamdas
- Succeeded by: Constituency abolished
- Constituency: Bilaspur-Durg-Raipur

Personal details
- Born: Meenakshi Devi; March 15, 1916 Sainabagan, Assam
- Died: August 11, 1973 (aged 57) Palam Airport, Delhi
- Spouse: Guru Agam Das (m. 1932)
- Parent(s): Budhari Das Mahant; Devmati Bai

Minimata Agam Das Guru (15 March 1916 – 11 August 1973) was an Indian politician from the Indian National Congress Party, and a Member of Parliament in the first through fifth terms of the Lok Sabha from Madhya Pradesh.

== Early life ==
Minimata was born in Meenakshi Devi in Sainabagan, Nagaon district in Assam in 1916 to Budharidas Mahant. She was educated at Girls School, Nagaon and Raipur.

She married Guru Agam Das, the then Guru of the Satnami Panth, on 2 July 1930.

== Political career ==
Minimata was elected to the first Lok Sabha in a bye-election in 1955 after the death of the sitting MP, her husband, Guru Agam Das. She contested the same constituency on a Congress party nomination and won. In 1962, she contested for the Indian National Congress party in Madhya Pradesh state, in Baloda Bazar, a Scheduled Caste reserved constituency. She won with more than 52% of the vote, defeating the Prajya Socialist Party candidate. In 1967, she contested for the Indian National Congress Party in the Schedule Caste reserved constituency of Janjgir, then in Madhya Pradesh state, winning with more than 62% of the vote. Minimata contested the same constituency of Janjgir in 1971, again for the Indian National Congress Party, and again winning the election. She died in 1973 before the end of her parliamentary term, prompting a by-election.

Besides her parliamentary work, she served as General Secretary, State Congress Committee; President of Guru Ghasidas Seva Sangh; President of Harijan Education Society; Vice-President, State Depressed Classes League; Secretary, Mahila Mandal, Raipur. She was also a member of the Social Welfare Board, Raipur and a member of District Congress Committee, Raipur. Minimata was associated with Satnami politics, a form of Ambedkarite Dalit self-assertion. After the death of her husband, she took on the leadership of the community. She stood against casteism and untouchability, as well as child marriage and dowry.

== Personal life ==
Her parliamentary profile listed her hobbies as reading, knitting, embroidery, cooking and gardening, and debating and discussion on social and political affairs.

Minimata died in an airplane crash on a flight from Raipur to Delhi; the plane crashed as it tried to land at Palam airport.
