= Raipur district =

- District of Chhattisgarh
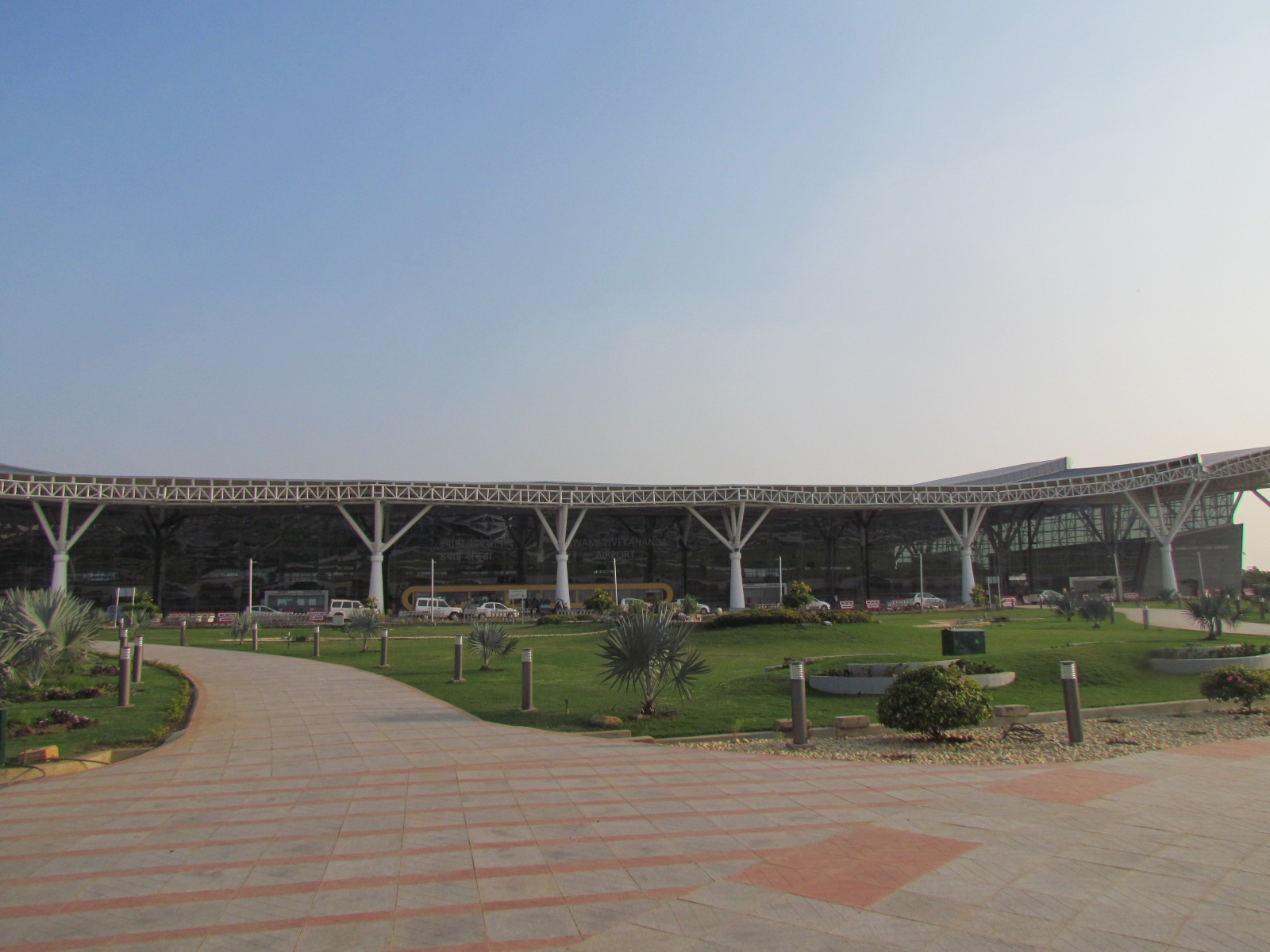
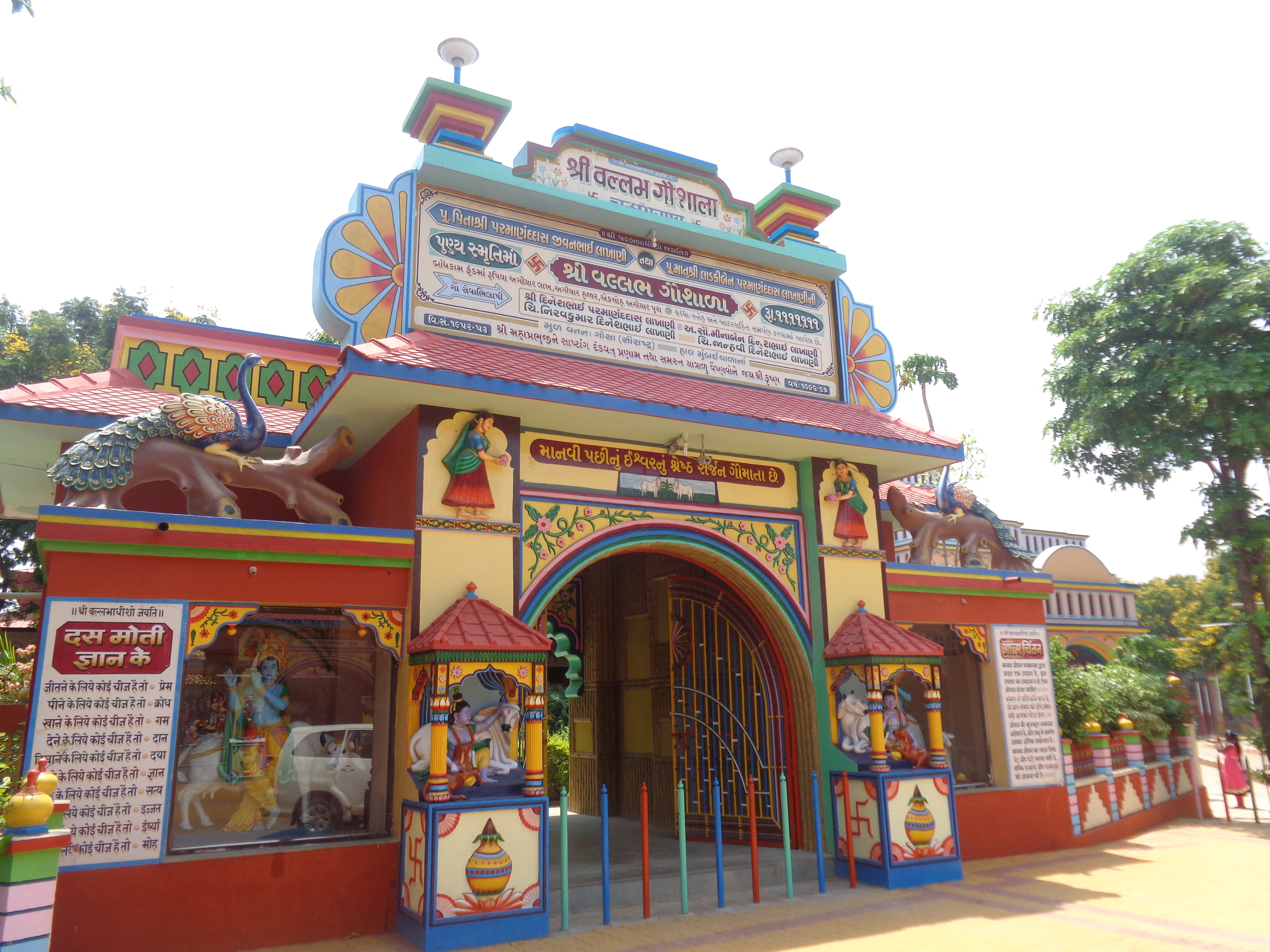
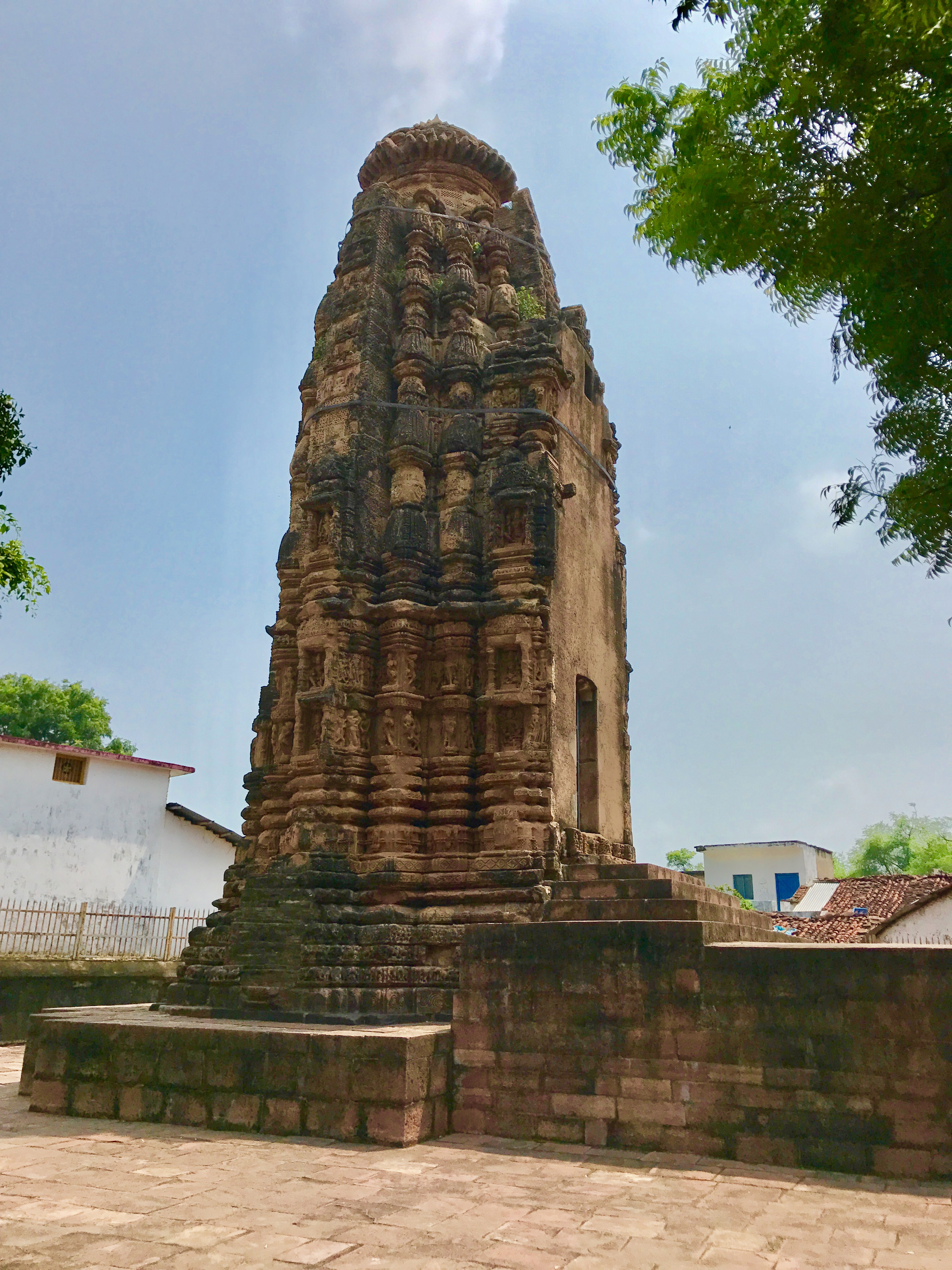
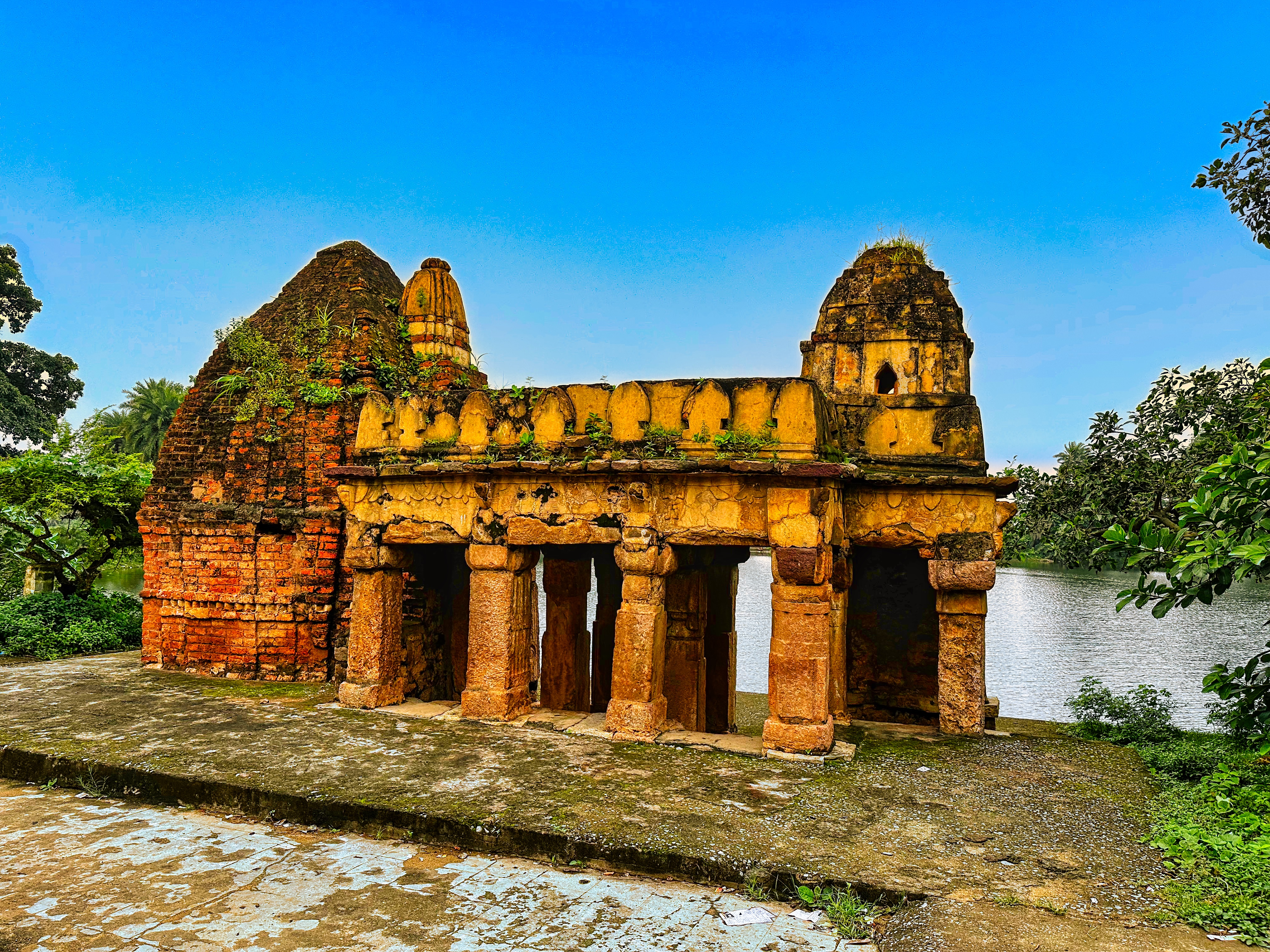
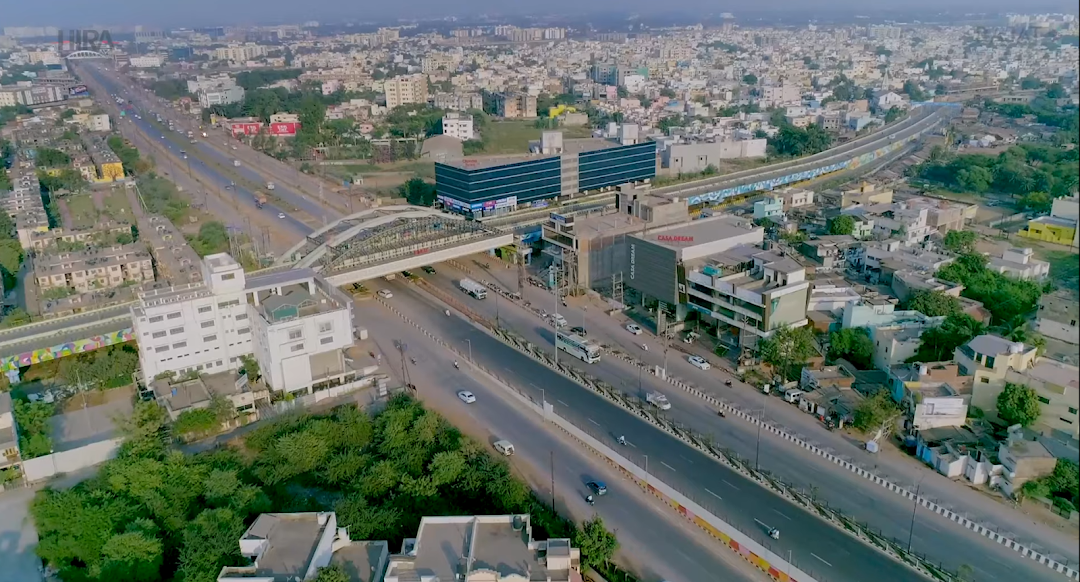
- Clockwise from top-left: Swami Vivekananda Airport, Balakrishnaji Mandir in Champaran, Temples in Nawagaon, Roads of Raipur, Arang Bhand Dewal Temple

- Location in Chhattisgarh
- Coordinates (Raipur): 20°55′N 82°00′E
- Country: India
- State: Chhattisgarh
- Division: Raipur
- Headquarters: Raipur

Area
  - Total: 2,891.98 km^{2} (1,116.60 sq mi)

Population (2011)
  - Total: 2,160,876
  - Density: 747.196/km^{2} (1,935.23/sq mi)

Demographics
- Average annual precipitation: 1385 mm
- Website: raipur.nic.in

Raipur district is a district in the Chhattisgarh state of India. Its administrative headquarters are located in the city of Raipur. The district is rich in mineral resources and there are many wildlife sanctuaries. With a population of 2 million, it is the most populous district of Chhattisgarh.

== History ==
Raipur district, like the rest of the Chhattisgarh plain, was once known as Dakshina Kosala and considered to be under the Maurya Empire. In Arang, near Raipur, a Gupta inscription dated to the 6th century CE shows Gupta hegemony over the region. In the 7th century CE, the region was ruled by a Buddhist kingdom in Bhandak in modern-day Maharashtra and was described by Xuanzang. A branch of this family later migrated to Sirpur in present-day Mahasamund district, and later took control of the entirety of Dakshina Kosala. This kingdom's prosperity reached its height with Tivaradeva. His son inscribed almost all temples in Sirpur. They were later ousted by the Sharabpuriyas, who took control of the rest of region and ruled for several centuries.

The Haihayas or Kalachuris, who claimed descent from the Chedis, later took control of the region in the early 9th century. The Haihaya ruler, Mughatunga, was the first of the dynasty to rule Chhattisgarh, and his grandson set up the capital in Ratanpur, modern Bilaspur district. Their territory included modern Raipur. The Kalachuris controlled the region from Ratanpur the next three centuries, building many temples throughout their kingdom. By the 12th century, many small portions of their realm were given as fiefdoms to minor princes of the family and their power declined. The Haihaiyas of the Raipur branch then began to gain strength: one of their kings conquered 18 garh, or forts, of the enemy - lending an etymology to Chhattisgarh, the 36 forts. They ruled until the reign of Amar Singh Deva in 1741.

In the mid-16th century, Kalyan Singh, current ruler of Raipur, took audience with Akbar and was rewarded with the title of Raja and other high titles. This was the first Muslim influence in Chhattisgarh, which would always remain limited. By the early 18th century, the Kalachuris had become the overlords of a large number of divided petty chiefdoms, but with little authority. The Kalachuri ruler Raghunath Singh was the final independent ruler from Ratanpur, and in 1740 the Maratha general Bhaskar Pant invaded the region. A despondent, heirless Singh did not put up much resistance, and the Marathas took the region with little loss. Raghunath Singh continued ruling as a Maratha vassal. In 1745, Raghunath Singh died and Pant installed Mohan Singh, a loyal Maratha vassal from the dynasty, on the throne, where he ruled until 1758 when his son Bhimbaji took control with Maratha support. Bhimbaji ruled virtually independently of Nagpur, but his brother Venkoji who succeeded him was far less interested in administration than Nagpur court politics. Although a subah, a governor, was appointed by Venkoji to administer the region for him, this was resisted and real administration of the region was done by Bhimaji's widow Anandi Bai and a council of ministers. After Anandi Bai's death in the early 19th century, the region was ruled by a series of governors under a very loose control of Nagpur and often exploited the office to become rich. After the Third Anglo-Maratha war in 1818, a British colonel administered the region. British accounts claim the people were 'oppressed' by the Marathas, especially their pindari raids. The country returned to rule by subahs from Nagpur in 1830, but Raipur was too remote to have much contact with the government. This continued until the annexation of Nagpur under the Doctrine of Lapse in 1854.

Amar Singh, the ruler of Raipur, continued ruling without Maratha interference until 1750. On his death, the Maratha government confiscated his holdings but later returned it to his son, whose family continued to hold revenue rights until Independence.

== Geography ==
It is situated between 22° 33' N to 21°14'N Latitude and 82° 6' to 81° 38'E Longitude. It occupies the south eastern part of the upper Mahanadi River valley and the bordering hills in the south and the east. The district is located on the Chhattisgarh plain, the areas near the hills being split off when the district was trifurcated.

The district borders Baloda Bazar district to the north, Mahasamund district to the east, Gariaband and Dhamtari districts to the south, and Durg and Bemetara districts to the west.

The Mahanadi River is the principal river of this district.

Raipur

Climate chart (precipitation, max. and min. temperature)
J	F	M	A	M	J	J	A	S	O	N	D
6.7 28 13	12 31 17	25 36 21	16 40 25	19 42 28	190 37 27	381 31 24	345 30 24	230 31 24	54 32 22	7.4 30 17	3.7 27 13
- █ Average max. and min. temperatures in °C
- █ Precipitation totals in mm
- Source: IMD
Imperial conversion
J	F	M	A	M	J	J	A	S	O	N	D
0.3 82 56	0.5 88 62	1 96 69	0.6 103 78	0.7 108 83	7.5 99 80	15 87 75	14 86 75	9.1 88 75	2.1 89 71	0.3 85 62	0.1 81 56
- █ Average max. and min. temperatures in °F
- █ Precipitation totals in inches

== Divisions ==
Raipur district is administratively divided into 4 development blocks and Tehsils Dharsiva, Arang, Tilda Newra, Abhanpur . It comprises one Lok Sabha Constituency (Raipur) and 9 Vidhan Sabha (Chhattisgarh Assembly) constituencies. The chief crop of this region is paddy. There are more than 50 large and middle scale industries in this district which have offered employment to over 10,000 people.

=== Villages ===
• Sejbahar
- Khairjhiti

== Demographics ==
According to the 2011 census Raipur district has a population of 2,160,876. This gives it a ranking of 211th in India (out of a total of 640). The district has a population balls density of 750 inhabitants per square kilometre (1,900/sq mi) . Its population growth rate over the decade 2001-2011 was 34.65%. Raipur has a sex ratio of 983 females for every 1000 males, and a literacy rate of 76.43%. 1,276,652 (59.08%) live in urban areas. Scheduled Castes and Scheduled Tribes make up 16.60% and 4.30% of the population respectively.

Religions in Raipur district (2011)
Religion	Percent
Hinduism	93.13%
Islam	4.06%
Christianity	0.85%
Jainism	0.74%
Sikhism	0.73%
Other or not stated	0.49%
Distribution of religions

=== Languages ===
Languages of Raipur district (2011)
1. Chhattisgarhi (61.8%)
2. Hindi (25.2%)
3. Odia (3.23%)
4. Sindhi (1.94%)
5. Marathi (1.33%)
6. Bengali (1.28%)
7. Urdu (1.01%)
8. Others (4.28%)

At the time of the 2011 Census of India, 61.77% of the population in the district spoke Chhattisgarhi, 25.16% Hindi, 3.21% Odia, 1.94% Sindhi, 1.33% Marathi, 1.28% Bengali and 1.01% Urdu as their first language.

Bhunjia, spoken by approximately 7000 Bhunjia Adivasis.

== Culture ==
Chhattisgarhi is the local language that most of the people in this area converse in. Raut Nacha, Dewar Nacha, Panthi & Soowa, Padki and Pandwani are some of musical styles and dance dramas. Pandwani is a famous musical way of singing Mahabharata in this region.

Women are fond of 'Kachhora' a typical manner of wearing saree. Women wearing 'Lugda' (saree) and 'Polkha' (blouse) with set of ornaments are symbolic of tradition and heritage of Chhattisgarh. Various decorative items used by women are Baandha (necklace made of coins) and silver necklace 'suta', 'Phuli' for nose, 'Bali' and Khuntis for ears, 'Ainthi' (of silver worn on forearm), Patta, Choora (bangles), Kardhani on waist (a belt like thing made of silver), Pounchhi a ring for upper arm and Bichhiya worn on toes. Men also decorate themselves with Koundhi (necklace of beads) and Kadhah (bangle) for occasions like dances.

Gouri-Goura, Surti, Hareli, pola and Teeja are the main festivals of this area. Celebrated in the month of 'Shravan' Hareli is a mark of greenery. Farmers worship farm equipment and cows on this occasion. They place branches and leaves of 'Bhelwa' (a tree resembling cashew tree and found in the forests and villages of this district) in the fields and pray for a good crop. People also hang small Neem branches at the main entrance of houses on this occasion to prevent occurrence of seasonal diseases. Baigas start teaching medicinal techniques to their disciples starting from Hareli for fifteen days (till panchami the next day of Ganesh Chaturthi). On this day, they examine their disciples for medical skills and if they satisfied with their performance, then traditionally they give acceptance to practice medicine. Disciples who fail in such examination continue to learn techniques in subsequent years till they succeed in recognition.

Children play 'gedi' (walking on bamboo) from the festival of hareli to pola. They display various feats on gedi and participate in gedi race. Hareli is also beginning of festivals for Chhattisgarhi people. Pola and Teeja follow Hareli. People celebrate POLA by worshipping Bullocks. Bull race is also a major event of the festival. Children play with Nandia-Bail (Nandi the Vahan of Lord Shiva) idols made of clay and fitted with clay wheels. Teeja is the festival of women. All married women pray for the welfare of their husbands on this occasion. The custom is to perform this prayer at the parents' place of the women . They eagerly wait for this occasion to come to spend some time at their birth places in festive and devotional mood. The feeling of togetherness and social harmony is filled in every festival and art of Chhattisgarh culture.one and only midday newspaper jantaserishta published from capital city raipur sine 10 years.

Champaran (Chhattisgarh) is a small town in the district that has religious significance as the birthplace of the Saint Vallabhacharya.
