= Basant Vikas Sahu =

Indian painter

- Born: 1969 (age 56–57); Dhamtari, Chhattisgarh, India
- Occupation: Painter

Basant Vikas Sahu is an Indian painter from Dhamtari. His works are known for depicting the folk culture, nature and social themes of Chhattisgarh. He has received recognition for his work in the field of art.

== Career ==
Sahu is from Kurud area of Dhamtari district. He continued his painting work after developing a physical disability and uses adapted techniques for creating artworks. His paintings include themes related to Chhattisgarh's traditions and social subjects.

He received the Helen Keller Award for his contributions to art. In 2025, he received the National Award for Empowerment of Persons with Disabilities from the President of India for his work in art and disability empowerment.
