= Onakona =

Onakona Ona Kona, Odemadih
- village
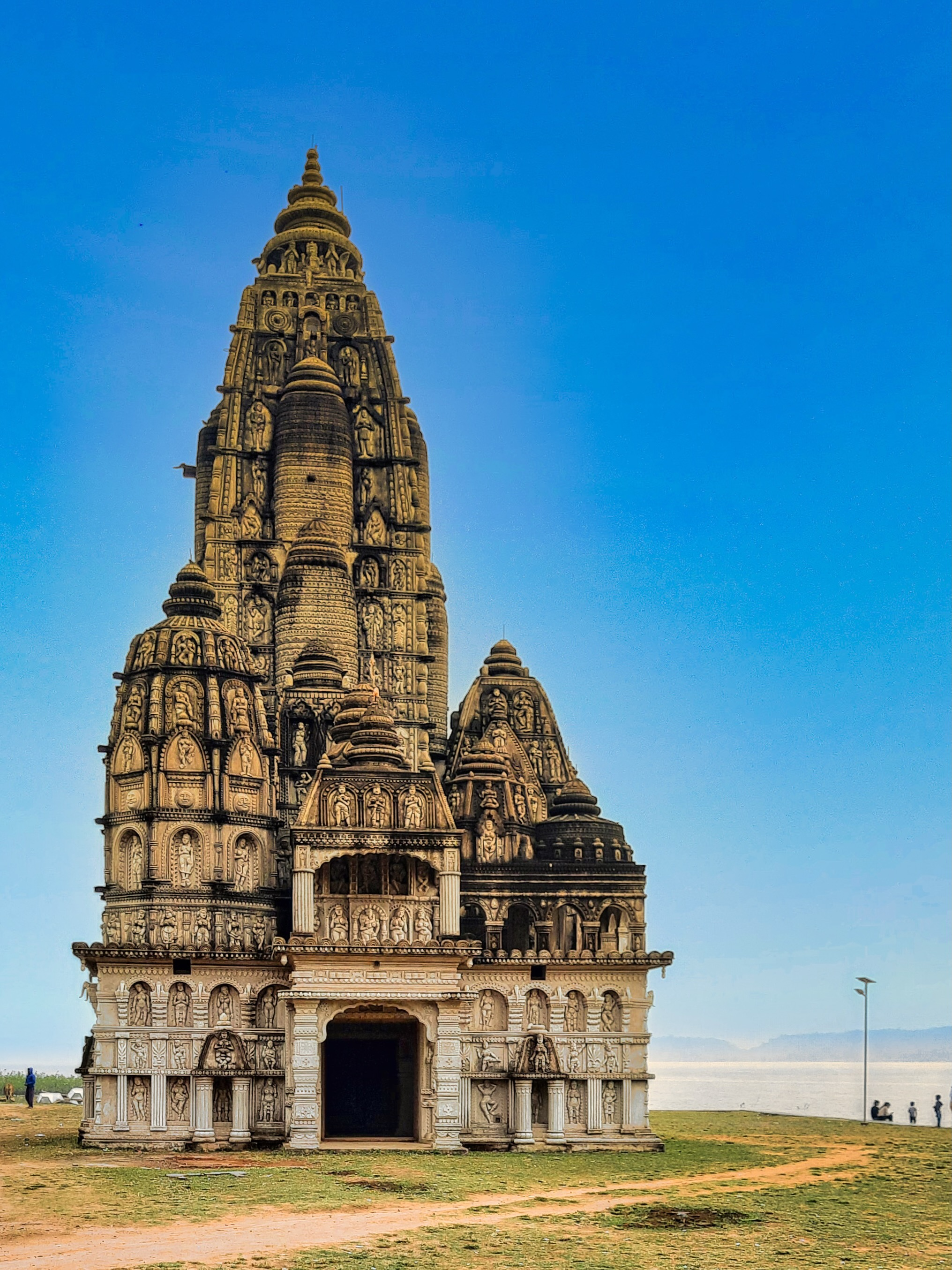
- The Shiva temple at Onakona

- Location in Chhattisgarh, India Onakona (India)
- Coordinates: 20.581°N 81.442°E
- Country: India
- State: Chhattisgarh
- District: Dhamtari District
- Tehsil: Gurur

Government
  - Body: Panchayat

Area
  - Total: 3.3673 km^{2} (1.3001 sq mi)

Population (2011)
  - Total: 182
  - Density: 54.0/km^{2} (140/sq mi)
- Time zone: UTC+5:30 (IST)
- PIN code: 491226

Onakona, also known as Odemadih, is a village in the Durg District of Chhattisgarh, India.

Onakona is located on the banks of the Gangrel Dam reservoir, built on the Mahanadi River. In the 21st century, Tirath Raj Futan of Dhamtari commissioned the construction of a Shiva temple at Onakona, modeled after the Trimbakeshwar Shiva Temple in Maharashtra. The temple is surrounded by a hill on one side, and the reservoir on the other, with a waterfall pond nearby, making it a popular tourist spot.

Onakona is located in the Gurur tehsil, and comes under the administration of the Karrajhar gram panchayat. As of 2011, the village has a population of 182 people, including 95 males and 87 females, who live in 38 houses. The effective literacy rate, that is the literacy rate of population aged 7 years and above, is 72.53%.
