= Bagoud =

Bagoud Bagaud
- village
- Location in Chhattisgarh, India Bagoud (India)
- Coordinates: 20.866906°N 81.656729°E
- Country: India
- State: Chhattisgarh
- District: Dhamtari

Population (2011)
  - Total: 2,983

Languages
  - Official: Hindi, Chhattisgarhi
- Time zone: UTC+5:30 (IST)
- Postal code: 493663
- Vehicle registration: CG

Bagoud is a village in Dhamtari District in the Indian state of Chhattisgarh, about 7 kilometres (4.3 mi) from Kurud. Bagoud has an average elevation of 298 metres (977 feet). It is situated near the national highway 30, nearly 53 km away from state capital Raipur.
