= Mor Chhainha Bhuinya =

2000 Chhattisgarhi film directed by Satish Jain

- Directed by: Satish Jain
- Written by: Satish Jain
- Produced by: Shivdayal Jain
- Starring: Shekhar Soni; Anuj Sharma; Poonam Naqvi; Jagriti Ray; Ashish Shendre; Manmohan Thakur
- Music by: Babla Bagchi
- Production company: Pooran Entertainment
- Distributed by: Sundrani Video World
- Release date: 27 October 2000
- Running time: 118 minutes
- Country: India
- Language: Chhattisgarhi
- Budget: est. ₹0.2 crore
- Box office: est. ₹2.5 crore

Mor Chhainha Bhuinya (transl. My Cherished Land) is a 2000 Chhattisgarhi-language comedy drama film directed by Satish Jain with Shekhar Soni, Anuj Sharma, Poonam Naqvi, Jagriti Rai, Ashish Shendre, and Manmohan Thakur in lead roles. It is the first film to be made in Chhattisgarhi language after Ghar Dwar (1971).

Mor Chhainha Bhuinya was released on Diwali day on October 27, 2000. The film was a major commercial and critical success. The film produced by Shivdayal Jain, is recognized as Anuj Sharma's debut film and is credited for giving a major impetus to Chhattisgarh's own film industry or Chhollywood. After 24 years the director came out with a sequel Mor Chhainha Bhuinya 2.

== Plot ==
The film is about a farmer family's trials and tribulations involving three generations. A man with his wife and children leaves his poor old parents' home alone and goes to Mumbai for work. However, disillusioned he is forced to return to the village after facing tough times in the big city where they had gone with many hopes and dreams.

== Cast ==
- Shekhar Soni as Uday
  - Piyush Mishra as young Uday
- Poonam Naqvi as Sudha, Uday's Lover
- Anuj Sharma as Kartik
  - Vash Shirshak as young Kartik
- Jagriti Rai
- Samita Nayak
- Ashish Shendre as Kishan, Kartik's father
- Sanju Sahu as Kartik's mother
- Suresh Gondale as Kartik's grandfather
- Nisha Gautam as Kartik's grandmother
- Chandrakala as Sudha's Sister
- Manmohan Thakur as Girdhari Pandey
- Ravi Tiwari as Netaji or Tauji
- Shiv Kumar as Dipak
- Anil Sharma as D.K. Sharma, College Principal
- Kshamanidhi Mishra as College Teacher
- Kamal Narayan Sinha as Librarian

== Production ==
=== Development ===
As no films were made in the Chhattisgarhi language till then for a long time, making the film was difficult for writer-director Satish Jain. He had a story ready, but no finance was available. This ultimately resulted in his father Shivdayal Jain to come in as a producer, however, continued budget constraints forced curtailing the movie by cutting back on shooting of 20 scenes and 1 song. Since the director couldn't afford a playback singer, he got his brother Tinkoo to sing a few songs. The director toured the state of Chhattisgarh extensively in search for suitable actors/actresses for his new film. A technical team came from Mumbai to shoot the movie and the action sequences were executed by fight master Andlib Pathan from Mumbai.

=== Filming ===
The film was mostly shot in and around the city of Bhilai, Chhattisgarh.

== Release and impact ==
Initially, no one was willing to distribute the movie. So the writer-director Satish Jain and his brother decided to distribute the film themselves. Exhibitors were apprehensive of the idea of screening a Chhattisgarhi film. But Satish Jain requested exhibitors to release the film in Raipur, Durg, and Bilaspur on the occasion of Diwali on October 27, 2000. Initially released with just 3 prints, the subsequent demand after the film became a superhit, meant that producers released additional 12 prints. Post release a new song was added. The film is culturally significant as three days after the release of the film, the state of Chhattisgarh was created. The film is credited with reviving the Chhattisgarhi film industry, as after its release nearly 2 dozen Chhattisgarhi films went on floor within few weeks. Not just film exhibitors but transporters also benefited from the film's release as they ferried people to and from towns and villages where there were no cinema halls, to the cities to watch the movie.

== Box office ==
The film ran for more than 100 days across many theatres of cities like Bhilai, Rajnandgaon, Korba, Dhamtari, Ambikapur, Sakti, Rajim in the newly formed state of Chhattisgarh grossing over est. ₹2.5 crores in lifetime collections. The film had a slow start in the first 2 days, but word-of-mouth publicity and the euphoria surrounding creation of a new state, turned the fortunes of the film from 3rd day onwards making it a blockbuster. The film surpassed other Bollywood films that were also released alongside it on Diwali such as Mohabbatein and Mission Kashmir in Chhattisgarh.

== Soundtrack ==
Mor Chhainha Bhuinya

Soundtrack album by Babla Bagchi
- Released: 28 October 2000
- Recorded: 2000
- Genre: Feature film soundtrack
- Length: 32:26
- Language: Chhattisgarhi
- Label: His Master's Voice (Saregama)
External audio
- Official Audio Jukebox on YouTube

The song Turi Ice Cream Kha Ke alone has racked in over 1 million views on YouTube.

All lyrics are written by Laxman Masturia, Vinay Bihari, Pushpa Kulu, and Rakesh Nirala; all music is composed by Babla Bagchi.

No.	Title	Singer(s)	Length
1.	"Chhainha Bhuinya La Chod" (Title Track)	Sunil Sharma	2:48
2.	"Bombai Ke Turi Re"	Sunil Sharma	3:22
3.	"Chhattisgarh ke Chore"	Tinkoo, Prabha Bharati	4:05
4.	"Dekh Ke Tola Sanghi Mola"	Pradeep Pandit, Prabha Bharati	6:02
5.	"Turi Ice Cream Kha Ke"	Pradeep Pandit	3:37
6.	"Jaan Le Pahechan Le"	Tinkoo, Prabha Bharati	4:06
7.	"Raipur Wale Ankh Marhi"	Sunil Sharma	3:19
8.	"Upparwale Ye Tor Khel"	Tinkoo	5:07
Total length:			32:26

== Sequel ==
After 23 years writer and director Satish Jain decided to make a sequel, Mor Chhainha Bhuinya 2. Satish Jain returns as writer and director of the new film, which is a remake or spiritual sequel of the original movie and was released on 24 May 2024. The lead characters in the new film play the same role as the original movie but the setting is different.

== See also ==
- Chhattisgarhi films
- Mor Chhainha Bhuinya 2
- Mor Chhainha Bhuinya 3
