= Mor Chhainha Bhuinya 3 =

2025 Chhattisgarhi film directed by Satish Jain

- Mor Chhainha Bhuinya 3 film poster
- Directed by: Satish Jain
- Written by: Satish Jain
- Produced by: Satish Jain
- Starring: Mann Qureshi; Elsa Ghosh; Diksha Jaiswal; Deepak Sahu
- Cinematography: Siddharth Singh
- Edited by: Tulendra Patel
- Music by: Sunil Soni
- Release date: 16 May 2025
- Running time: 163 mins
- Country: India
- Language: Chhattisgarhi
- Budget: est. ₹1.25 crore
- Box office: est. ₹11.12 crore

Mor Chhainha Bhuinya 3 (transl. My Cherished Land 3) is a 2025 Indian Chhattisgarhi-language film directed by Satish Jain and is a direct sequel of the film Mor Chhainha Bhuinya 2 (2024). The film Mor Chhainha Bhuinya 3 returns the actors from the previous film, including Mann Qureshi, Elsa Ghosh, Deepak Sahu, Diksha Jaiswal in the lead as well as several new faces including Prakash Awasthi, Ishika Yadav, and Lakshit Jhanji. During the 50-day celebration of the film Mor Chhainha Bhuiya 2, the director Satish Jain had announced the making of Mor Chhainha Bhuinya 3, and the shooting of the film started on 12 November 2024. The film's trailer was launched on 4 May 2025. The new film which continues the story from the last film, was released on 16 May 2025. It may be noted that the second part was released after 24 years, and the third part is releasing after a gap of 1 year.

== Cast ==
- Mann Qureshi
- Diksha Jaiswal
- Deepak Sahu
- Elsa Ghosh
- Prakash Awasthi
- Suresh Gondale
- Sumitra Sahu
- Lakshit Jhanji
- Manoj Joshi
- Ishika Yadav
- Richa Yadav
- Anjali Singh Chouhan
- Anil Sharma
- Nitin Gwala
- Vivek Chandra
- Dharmendra Choubey
- Upasana Vaishnav
- Sanjay Mahanand
- Vivek Chandra
- Pushpendra Singh Thakur
- Kranti Dikshit
- Pradeep

== Production ==
=== Development ===
Satish Jain who had written, produced, and directed the previous film, has also produced the new film. He also wrote the story, lyrics, dialogues, besides directing the new movie. Lalit Sinha has also returned as co-producer for the film. Most of the technical staff too has returned for the sequel. Alekh Chaudhary is the executive producer. Sunil Soni returns as music director, with choreography by Chandan Deep and action sequences coordinated by Kundradhur S. Babu.

=== Casting ===
More than 40 actors have been cast in the film. Satish Jain cast the pair of Mann Qureshi and Diksha Jaiswal together after B.A. Final Year, and Mor Chhainha Bhuinya 2 Jain also cast Elsa Ghosh and Deepak Sahu. Deepak Sahu will be seen in a double role in this movie. Bhojpuri actress Ishika Yadav is making her debut in Chhattisgarhi films with this movie. New additions to the cast Nitin Gwala, Dharmendra Choubey, and Kranti Dikshit have been cast as antagonist in the film.

== Marketing ==
The film was marketed across major cities in the Indian state of Chhattisgarh.

== Soundtrack ==
Mor Chhainha Bhuinya 3

Soundtrack album by Sunil Soni
- Released: 8 May 2025
- Recorded: 2024–2025
- Genre: Feature film soundtrack
- Length: 22:57
- Language: Chhattisgarhi
- Label: Sundari Music
External audio
- Official Audio Jukebox on YouTube

The film soundtrack has music by Sunil Soni has songs penned by the late Laxman Masturiya, Satish Jain (the director), and Girvar Das Manikpuri. The singers include names such as Sunil Soni, Gore Lal Barman, Anupama Mishra, Anurag Sharma, Manoj Verma, Champa Nishad, Kanchan Joshi, and Monika Soni.

Track listing
No.	Title	Lyrics	Music	Singer(s)	Length
1.	"Sona Jaisa Dil"	Satish Jain	Sunil Soni	Sunil Soni, Kanchan Joshi	4:29
2.	"Lali Lali Lugra"	Laxman Masturia	Sunil Soni	Sunil Soni, Gorelal Burman, Anurag Sharma, Manoj Verma, Champa Nishad, Kanchan Joshi, Monika Verma	5:06
3.	"Mayaa Karela Tola Aaye Nahi Woh"	Satish Jain	Sunil Soni	Deepak Sahu, Richa Dixit	4:53
4.	"Heartbeat"	Dhanraj Dadhich, Satish Jain	Sunil Soni	Sunil Soni, Anupama Mishra	4:31
5.	"Daaru Nahi Chadhay"	Satish Jain	Sunil Soni	Deepak Sahu, Richa Dixit	4:30
Total length:					22:57

== Box Office ==
The film registered multiple housefull shows in numerous single-screen theatres across the state. In some theatres particularly in the capital Raipur, a single show's collection were all-time record. The film was released across 74 cinema halls across the state of Chhattisgarh on the day of release.

== See also ==
- Chhattisgarhi films
- Mor Chhainha Bhuinya
- Mor Chhainha Bhuinya 2
