= Mor Chhainha Bhuinya 2 =

2024 Chhattisgarhi film directed by Satish Jain

- Directed by: Satish Jain
- Written by: Satish Jain
- Produced by: Lalit Sinha; Shailendra Sinha; Saurabh Agarwal; Satish Jain
- Starring: Mann Qureshi; Elsa Ghosh; Diksha Jaiswal; Deepak Sahu
- Cinematography: Siddharth Singh
- Edited by: Tulendra Patel
- Music by: Sunil Soni, Babla Bagchi
- Release date: 24 May 2024
- Running time: 160 mins
- Country: India
- Language: Chhattisgarhi
- Budget: est. ₹1.25 crore
- Box office: est. ₹11.0 crore

Mor Chhainha Bhuinya 2 (transl. My Cherished Land 2) is a 2024 Indian Chhattisgarhi-language film directed by Satish Jain and is a remake or spiritual sequel of the cult film Mor Chhainha Bhuinya (2000). After 23 years, writer and director Satish Jain who had also directed the original movie, decided to make a sequel, Mor Chhainha Bhuinya 2. He returned as writer and director of the new film that was released on 24 May 2024. The lead characters in the new film play the same role as the original but the new film's setting is different.

The film Mor Chhainha Bhuinya 2 stars Mann Qureshi, Elsa Ghosh, Deepak Sahu, and Diksha Jaiswal in the lead. The film's trailer was launched on 17 May 2024 and is the first sequel film to be made in Chhollywood.

During the 50-day celebration of the movie, the director announced the making of Mor Chhainha Bhuinya 3, and the shooting of the film was expected to start in November 2024. The film has been a trendsetter for sequels in the Chhollywood with numerous sequels following suit.

== Premise ==
The film is about 2 brothers, Uday and Kartik, who grow up together in Chhattisgarh. There is always a clash between them with differences in their political ideologies, but the love for each other in their hearts is still strong. One day, however, they find themselves pitted against each other, which puts them in a dilemma: to choose their love or their ideology.

== Cast ==
- Mann Qureshi as Uday
- Diksha Jaiswal
- Deepak Sahu as Kartik
- Elsa Ghosh
- Suresh Godale
- Chote lal Sahu
- Preeti Rajvaidya
- Sheetal Sharma
- Rajneesh Jhanji
- Sumitra Sahu
- Manoj Verma
- Manoj Joshi
- Anjali Singh Chouhan
- Anil Sharma
- Pushpendra Singh Thakur
- Kranti Dikshit
- Pradeep Sharma

== Production ==
=== Development ===
Satish Jain, who had written and directed the original film, has also produced the new film. He not only wrote the story but also the lyrics, and dialogues, besides directing the new movie. The director has developed the film with a story based on the political landscape of the region.

=== Casting ===
Director Satish Jain cast the hit pair of Mann Qureshi and Diksha Jaiswal together after B.A. Final Year, Director Satish Jain cast Elsa Ghosh once again in this film after Le Suru Hoge Maya Ke Kahani in 2023. The director has cast over two dozen actors for the film.

== Soundtrack ==
Mor Chhainha Bhuinya 2

Soundtrack album by Sunil Soni, Kanchan Joshi
- Released: 6 November 2025
- Recorded: 2024–2025
- Genre: Feature film soundtrack
- Length: 31:04
- Language: Chhattisgarhi
- Label: AVM Gana
External audio
- Official Audio Jukebox on YouTube

All lyrics are written by Satish Jain, Laxman Masturia; all music is composed by Sunil Soni, Babla Bagchi

No.	Title	Singer(s)	Length
1.	"Maya Ke Mausam" (Title Track)	Sunil Soni, Kanchan Joshi	05:50
2.	"Hogev Maya Ma Behal"	Sunil Soni, Kanchan Joshi, Nitin Dubey, Anupama Mishra	04:08
3.	"Man Dolat Have Na"	Sunil Soni, Shraddha Mandal	05:07
4.	"Tola Bhanwar Parana He"	Nitin Dubey, Anupama Mishra	05:56
5.	"Tor Achara Ke Chhaiya"	Sunil Soni, Kanchan Joshi	04:58
6.	"Aama Tor Ke La Dehu"	Sunil Soni, Anupama Mishra	05:05
Total length:			31:04

While other songs have together clocked over 2 million views on YouTube, the title track "Maya Ke Mausam" alone has garnered over 2.4 million views on YouTube.

== Marketing ==
The lead actors of the film, Mann Qureshi, Diksha Jaiswal, Deepak Sahu, and Elsa Ghosh, have promoted the film across the state.

== Box office ==
The film Mor Chhainha Bhuinya 2 ran to packed houses for over 2 months across Chhattisgarh and earned ₹9.7 crore nett in India. The film has made ₹1.30 crore additionally, for a total gross of ₹11.0 crore.

== Sequel ==
It may be noted that during the 50-day celebration of the film Mor Chhaiya Bhuiya 2, the director Satish Jain had announced the making of Mor Chhainha Bhuinya 3, as the direct sequel. The shooting of the sequel film started on 12 November 2024 with muhurat shot.

== See also ==
- Chhattisgarhi films
- Mor Chhainha Bhuinya
- Mor Chhainha Bhuinya 3
