= Dharsiwa Assembly constituency =

Legislative Assembly constituency in Chhattisgarh State, India

Coordinates: 21.41°N 81.67°E

Dharsiwa
- Constituency No. 47 for the Chhattisgarh Legislative Assembly

Constituency details
- Country: India
- Region: Central India
- State: Chhattisgarh
- District: Raipur
- Lok Sabha constituency: Raipur
- Established: 1957
- Total electors: 234,726
- Reservation: None

Member of Legislative Assembly
- 6th Chhattisgarh Legislative Assembly
- Incumbent Anuj Sharma
- Party: Bharatiya Janata Party
- Elected year: 2023
- Preceded by: Anita Yogendra Sharma

Dharsiwa is one of the 90 Legislative Assembly constituencies of Chhattisgarh state in India. It is in Raipur district and is a part of the Lok Sabha constituency of Raipur.

Anuj Sharma of Bharatiya Janata Party was elected as the Member of the Legislative Assembly from this seat in the 2023 Chhattisgarh Legislative Assembly elections defeating Chhaya Verma and replaced Anita Yogendra Sharma of Indian National Congress as the new incumbent.

== Members of the Legislative Assembly ==
Year	Member	Party
Madhya Pradesh Legislative Assembly
1957	Khubchand Baghel	Praja Socialist Party
1962	Hari Prem Baghel	Praja Socialist Party
1967	Munnalal Shukla	Indian National Congress
1972	Munnalal Shukla	Indian National Congress
1977	Ashwini Kumar Lakhanlal	Janata Party
1980	Mahant Rameshwar Giri	Indian National Congress
1985	Daulatram Verma	Indian National Congress
1990	Shyam Sundar Agrawal	Bharatiya Janata Party
1993	Balaram Verma	Bharatiya Janata Party
1998	Vidhan Mishra	Indian National Congress
Chhattisgarh Legislative Assembly
2003	Devjibhai Patel	Bharatiya Janata Party
2008	Devjibhai Patel	Bharatiya Janata Party
2013	Devjibhai Patel	Bharatiya Janata Party
2018	Anita Yogendra Sharma	Indian National Congress
2023	Anuj Sharma	Bharatiya Janata Party

== Election results ==
=== 2023 ===
Chhattisgarh Legislative Assembly Election, 2023: Dharsiwa
Party	Candidate	Votes	%	±%
BJP	Anuj Sharma	107,283	58.65	+22.42
INC	Chhaya Verma	62,940	34.41	−13.61
Jai Chhattisgarh Party	Amit Baghel	4,075	2.23	
Independent	Ravi Kumar Verma	2,243	1.23	
NOTA	None of the Above	463	0.25	−0.58
Majority		44,343	24.24	+12.45
Turnout		182,921	77.93	−0.54
BJP gain from INC		Swing		

=== 2018 ===
Chhattisgarh Legislative Assembly Election, 2018: Dharsiwa
Party	Candidate	Votes	%	±%
INC	Anita Yogendra Sharma	78,989	48.02	
BJP	Devji Bhai Patel	59,589	36.23	
JCC	Panna Lal Sahu	14,968	9.10	
Independent	Sanju Yadav	3,343	2.03	
Independent	Sangita Baghel	2,197	1.34	
NOTA	None of the Above	1,361	0.83	
Majority		19,400	11.79	
Turnout		164,490	78.47	
INC gain from BJP		Swing		

== See also ==
- List of constituencies of the Chhattisgarh Legislative Assembly
- Raipur district
