= Satish Jain (director) =

Director of Chhattisgahi Films

- Born: Satish Kumar Jain; Bhanupratappur, Bastar, Chhattisgarh
- Education: Uday Prasad Uday Government Polytechnic, Durg
- Occupations: Film Director; Screenwriter; Producer
- Years active: 1988–present
- Parent(s): Shivdayal Jain (father), Shanti Jain (mother)

Satish Jain is an Indian film writer and director who has worked mainly in the Chhattisgarhi, Bhojpuri and Hindi film industries. He made his debut as a director with the Chhattisgarhi movie Mor Chhainha Bhuinya in 2000. He is fondly called the Manmohan Desai of Chhollywood. He has also been honourned in 2021 for his contribution to Chhattisgarhi cinema.

Growing up Jain's brush with films started at an early age when he watched films while visiting his relatives in Kanker, Bilaspur, and Dhamtari. However, the real desire in him to work in Bollywood developed when he watched Sridevi in films like Himmatwala and Solva Sawan. Jain who is known for directing commercially successful movies insists on not making films on other's stories. He holds the record for making maximum number of successful Chhattisgarhi films.

== Career ==
=== Early career ===
Satish Jain came to Mumbai in 1984 to work in the film industry. He started his career as reporter for a film magazine named Madhuri. Working there he became close to actor Suresh Oberoi who introduced him to Mukul Anand who gave him a chance to work as one of the assistant directors in the film Sultanat. His career took off when he got chance to work as an assistant director with director Kriti Kumar for the film Hatya (1988). Jain went on to write dialogue, script and screenplay for films such as Dulara (1994), Aag (1994), Apne Dam Par (1996), Rajaji (1999), and Had Kar Di Aapne (2000).

=== Director ===
Jain made his directorial debut with Mor Chhainha Bhuiyan (2000). The thought of directing a film came to Jain from the film Hadh Kar Di Aapne (2000) when this film was not shaping up as the story of the film written by him. As the first successful film in Chhattisgarhi cinema or Chhollywood, the film celebrated Silver Jubilee.

Jain had toured the state extensively in search for actors for his film. The first Chhattisgarhi film to be released after Ghar Dwar (1971), Mor Chhainha Bhuiyan is a historic film that gave birth to the Chhattisgarhi film industry. It ran for over 100 days in several theatres in the newly formed state, even pushing ahead of bollywood flicks like Mohabbatein and Mission Kashmir in the state.

After 23 years Satish Jain decided to make a sequel, Mor Chhainha Bhuinya 2. He returned as producer, writer, and director of the new film, which is a remake or spiritual sequel of the original movie. The film is a trendsetter for sequels in Chhollywood.

During the 50-day celebration of the movie, the director announced the making of Mor Chhainha Bhuinya 3, and the shooting of the film is expected to start in November 2024.

== Filmography ==
Year	Title	Director	Writer	Producer	Language	Note	Ref.
1992	Panaah		Yes		Hindi	1st film as writer	
1994	Dulaara		Yes		Hindi		
1994	Aag		Yes		Hindi		
1995	Hathkadi		Yes		Hindi	dialogue only	
1996	Apne Dam Par		Yes		Hindi		
1998	Pardesi Babu		Yes		Hindi		
1999	Rajaji		Yes		Hindi		
1999	Sanyasi Mera Naam		Yes		Hindi	story only	
2000	Hadh Kar Di Aapne		Yes		Hindi		
2000	Mor Chhainha Bhuinya	Yes	Yes	Yes	Chhattisgarhi	1st film as director	
2003	Jhan Bhulo Maa Baap La	Yes	Yes		Chhattisgarhi		
2009	Mayaa	Yes	Yes		Chhattisgarhi		
2010	Tura Rikshawala	Yes	Yes	Yes	Chhattisgarhi		
2013	Laila Tip Top Chhaila Angutha Chhap	Yes			Chhattisgarhi		
2014	Nirahua Hindustani	Yes			Bhojpuri	1st Bhojpuri film as director	
2015	Nirahua Rickshawala 2	Yes			Bhojpuri		
2015	I Love Desi		Yes		Hindi		
2016	Aashik Aawara	Yes			Bhojpuri		
2016	Ram Lakhan	Yes			Bhojpuri		
2017	Challenge	Yes	Yes		Bhojpuri		
2017	Dilwalaa	Yes			Bhojpuri		
2018	Baadal	Yes			Bhojpuri		
2019	Has Jhan Pagli Fas Jabe	Yes			Chhattisgarhi		
2022	Chal Hat Kono Dekh Lihi	Yes			Chhattisgarhi		
2022	Saudagar	Yes	Yes		Bhojpuri		
2022	Munna Bhai		Yes		Bhojpuri		
2023	Le Shuru Hoge Maya Ke Kahani	Yes			Chhattisgarhi		
2024	Mor Chhainha Bhuinya 2	Yes	Yes	Yes	Chhattisgarhi		
2025	Mor Chhainha Bhuinya 3	Yes	Yes	Yes	Chhattisgarhi		

== Music video ==
Release date	Song	Singer
9 September 2021	Gajanana	Rajan Kar & Kanchan Joshi

== Awards ==
Year	Award	Category	Work	Result	Ref(s)
2015		Best Director	Nirahua Hindustani	Won	
2020	Smart Cinema Award	Best Director	Has Jhan Pagli Fas Jabe	Won	
2020	Smart Cinema Award	Best Story	Has Jhan Pagli Fas Jabe	Won	
2022	Smart Cinema Award	Best Director	Chal Hat Kono Dekh Lihi	Won	

== External link ==
Satish Jain at IMDb
