= Babu Chotelal Shrivastava =

Indian independence activist (1889–1976)

Babu Chotelal Srivastava
- Born: 28 February 1889
- Died: 18 July 1976 (aged 87)
- Monuments: Babu Chotelal Srivastava Library, Babu Chotelal Srivastava Govt. P.G. College, Babu Chhotelal Srivastava Squre, Koshtapara
- Known for: Kandel Satyagrah

Babu Chotelal Srivastava (28 February 1889 – 18 July 1976) was an Indian independence activist in the area that would later become Chhattisgarh. He was born on 28 February 1889 in Kandel. His participation in national movements began after he met Pt. Sundarlal Sharma. In 1915, he established the Srivastava Library. His house in Dhamtari was a major center of the Indian independence movement. He was also among the principal organizers of the Dhamtari Tehsil Political Council in the year 1918. Chhotelal Srivastava was most famous for organizing the Kandel Nehar Satyagraha, a rebellion against the British Raj.

Leading the peasants, they demonstrated against the British Raj. In 1921, he established the Khadi Production Center for the Swadeshi movement. A Jungle Satyagraha was held in Sihawa in 1922 under the leadership of Shyam Lal Som, where Babu Chotelal Srivastava gave full support. When the Jungle Satyagraha was decided to be in Bandwagon near Rudri in 1930, Srivastava played an active role in it. He was then arrested and sent to jail where he was tortured, bringing additional attention to the Satyagrahis. In 1933, Gandhi, on his second visit to Chhattisgarh, went to Tamarind. There, he praised the leadership of Babu Chhote Lal. In the year 1937, Srivastava was elected the President of the Dhamtari Municipality Corporation. Shrivastava also had an active role in the Quit India Movement of 1942. Babu Chotelal Srivastava died on 18 July 1976 in Kandel, an area of great pilgrimage of the Indian independence movement.
