= Anuj Sharma (actor) =

Indian film and TV actor and director and MLA of Chhattisgarh

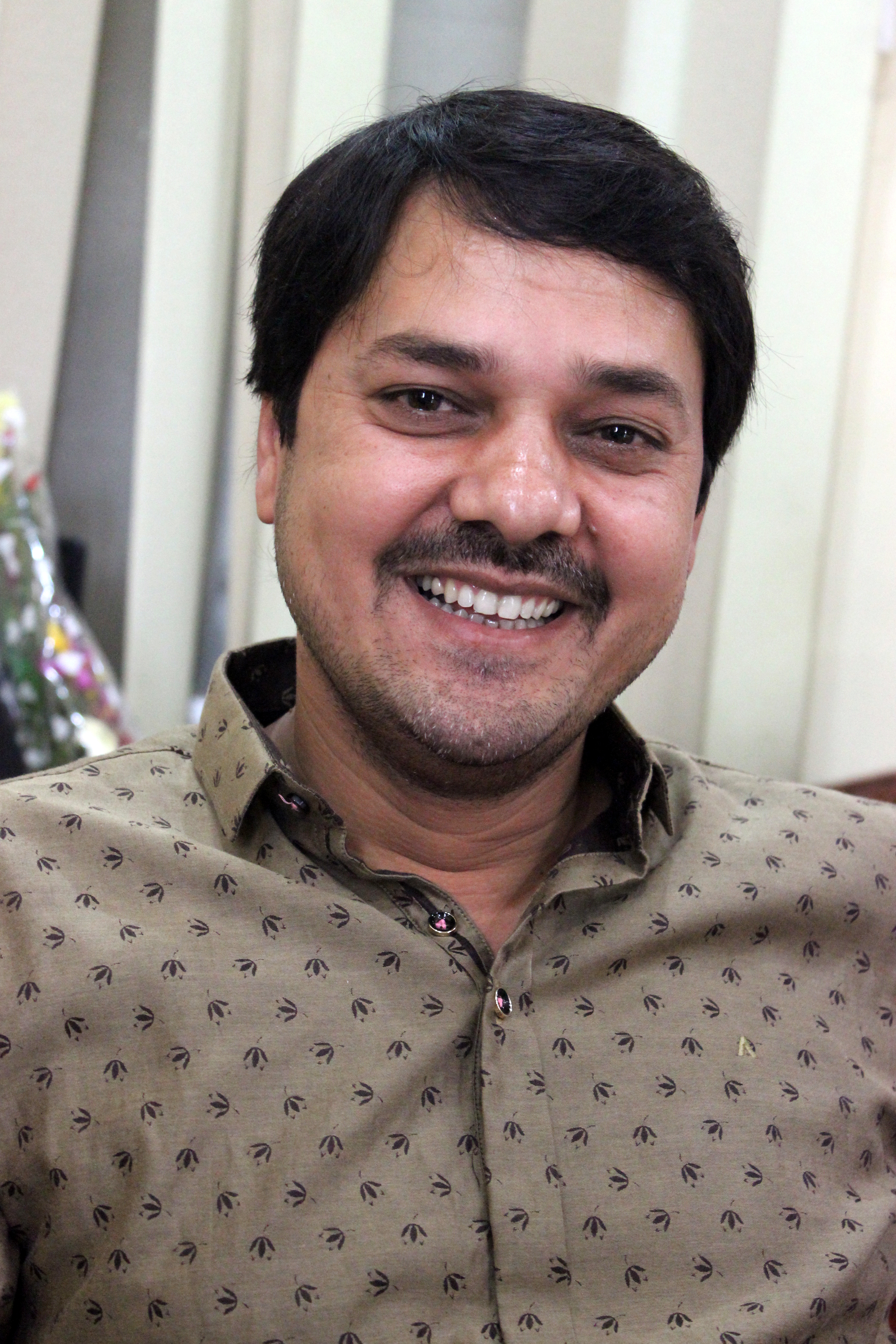
- Padmshree Anuj Sharma from Chhattisgarh.

Member of the Chhattisgarh Legislative Assembly
- Incumbent
- Assumed office 3 December 2023
- Preceded by: Anita Yogendra Sharma
- Constituency: Dharsiwa

Personal details
- Born: 15 May 1976 (age 50) Bhatapara, Raipur, Chhattisgarh, India
- Party: Bharatiya Janata Party
- Spouse: Dr. Smita Sharma
- Children: 2
- Parent(s): Lt. Teken Lal Sharma; Dehuti Sharma
- Occupation: Indian film and television actor and director
- Awards: Padma Shri
- Website: anujsharma.in

Ramanuj Sharma (born 15 May 1976), popularly known as Anuj Sharma, is an Indian politician and film, stage and television personality in Chhattisgarhi cinema. He was awarded Padma Shri, the fourth highest civilian award, by the Government of India in 2014, for his services in the field of arts. He is the first film personality from Chhattisgarh to receive the Padma Shri award.

He is also an MLA from Dharsiwa Assembly constituency representing Bharatiya Janata Party.

== Biography ==
There are only three theatres in southern Chhattisgarh and the condition of the rest of the state is not good either. We need to reach a wider audience., Sharma on the state of movies in Chhattisgarh.

Sharma was born to Teken Lal Sharma and Dehuti Sharma at Bhatapara in Raipur, Chhattisgarh. He did his schooling at Bhatapara and later, secured a master's degree in history from the Pandit Ravishankar Shukla University, Raipur. He married Smita Sharma and they have two children. They reside at Labhandi, Raipur. Earlier he was a resident of Sant Kabir Nagar, Raipur.

== Political career ==
In June 2023, Sharma joined the Bharatiya Janata Party and won the 2023 Chhattisgarh Legislative Assembly election from Dharsiwa Assembly constituency defeating Chhaya Verma of the Indian National Congress by a margin of 44,343 votes.

== Film career ==
Sharma started acting and singing at the age of ten. After a brief stint as the marketing executive, he made his debut in the 2000 film, Mor Chhaihan Bhuiyan, considered to be the first of the modern era in Chhattisgarhi film history, which was till then at a nascent stage. The first Chhattisgarhi film was made in 1965 and the second one in 1971. The film became a commercial success.

The success of the debut film made him a star and he had eight releases a year and 4 silver jubilee hits, the only lead actor to do so in Chhattisgarhi films. Some of his movies like Maya, Mister Tetkuram and Mahu Diwana Tahu Diwani, were a big success and got him best actor award four times. The prolificacy of his acting career also returned two of his films being released on the same day. Sharma's films have been dubbed into many other languages such as Sambalpuri, Jharkhandi, Bundelkhandi, Gujarati, and Bhojpuri. He has also acted in a number of Bhojpuri films.

He has active presence on stage and television in various parts of central India. He is also associated with UNICEF for the campaigns in Chhattisgarh. He has also performed as radio jockey in the National FM channel and was the first Chhattisgarhi compere. He has compered around 125 television shows so far. He has also made advertisement and promotion films for the Chhattisgarh Tourism Board and for other commercial institutions as well.

A Chhattisgarhi folk singer by practice, Sharma is reported to be at ease singing all styles of Chhattisgarhi folk songs. He has over 100 video albums, has sung over 200 film and folk songs, and has composed music for 10 audio albums. He also owns a music label called "Aaarug Music".

== Filmography ==
- All films are in Chhattisgarhi language unless otherwise noted.

Year	Title	Role	Note(s)	Ref(s)
2000	Mor Chhainha Bhuinya	Kartik	debut film	
2001	Maya Dede Maya Lele	Rakesh		
2001	Mor Sang Chalav	Suraj		
2001	Angna			
2002	Mai Ke Maryada		Bhojpuri debut film	
2003	Tor Sang Jeena Sangi Tor Sang Marna			
2003	Jhan Bhulav Ma Bap La			
2006	Hamar Dulahaniya Bade Paise Wali		Bhojpuri film	
2007	Raghubeer			
2008	Kisan Arjun		Bhojpuri film	
2009	Mayaa			
2010	Bidhi Ke Bidhan			
2010	Bhanwar			
2010	Samiyaar Khel		Sambalpuri film	
2010	Mor Karam Mor Dharam			
2010	Maya De De Mayaru			
2010	Turi No.1			
2010	Mahu Deewana Tahu Deewani			
	Hero No.1			
2011	Sajana Mor			
2011	Mister Tekuram		also writer and producer	
2011	Ajab Jingi Gajab Jingi			
2013	Mor Man Ke Meet			
2013	Phulwari			
2014	Jai Maa Shakambari		Hindi debut film	
2015	Raja Chhattisgarhiya			
2016	Raja Chhattisgarhiya 2			
2017	Rang Rasiya	Bhola Rasiya		
2018	Prem Ke Bandhna			
2018	Dabang Droga			
2019	Ticket To Chhollywood	himself		
2019	Rangobati			
2019	Raja Bhaiya Ek Awara			
2022	Mar Dare Maya Ma	Sattu		
2023	Mor Yaar Superstar			
2025	Suhaag	Ajay		

== Discography ==
- All songs are in Chhattisgarhi language unless otherwise noted.

Year	Song	Album	Composer	Note(s)	Ref(s)
2018	Maya Hoge Re	Sorry Love You Jaan	Ghanshyam Mahanand and Pramod Manikpur	Duet with Champa Nishad	
2019	Mann Ke Kora Kagaj	Single	Himself		
2021	Raja Rani	Single	Nagesh	Duet with Gyanita Dwivedi	
2021	Maya Lage Rahithe	Single		Duet with Alka Chandrakar	
2021	Aarug Kalsa	Single	Somdatt Panda		
2022	Mate Rahibe	Single	Saurabh Mahto		
2022	Ful Hasan Lage	Mar Daare Maya Ma	Sunil Soni, Navaldas Manikpuri	Duet with Alka Chandrakar Parganiha	
2022	Gheri Beri (Duet Version)	Single	Sunil Soni, Navaldas Manikpuri	Duet with Monika Verma	
2022	Ka Janav Kaise	Single	Naveen Sahu	Duet with Gyanita Dwivedi	
2022	Nav Din Navrat	Single	Saurabh Mahto		
2022	Tor Bina Suna	Mar Daare Maya Ma	Prabodh Ranjan Sahu	Duet with Alka Chandrakar	
2022	Man Ke Kora Kagaj	Single	Prafulla Behra		
2022	Tahin Batana	Single	Prafulla Behra		
2023	A Bairi	Single		Duet with Kanchan Joshi	
2023	Sawan Sawan Aage	Single		Duet with Kanchan Joshi	

== Awards and recognitions ==
Anuj (Ramanuj) Sharma was honoured by the Government of India by awarding him the Padma Shri, in 2014, in recognition of his efforts to the cause of art. Anuj Sharma has also received many other awards such as:

Film awards

Category	Film	Awarded by	Year
Best Actor	Mor Chhainha Bhuinya	Chhattisgarh Film Awards	2002
Best Playback Singer	Angana	Chhattisgarh Film Awards	2002
Best Actor	Mor Chhainha Bhuinya	Government of Chhattisgarh	2003
Best Actor	Jhan Bhulav Maa Baap La	Chhattisgarh Film Awards	2005
Best Actor	Mahun Diwana Tahun Diwani	Chhattisgarh Film Awards	2010
Best Film	Mister Tetkuram	Grandyara Ranjhanjhar Chhattisgarhi Cine Award	2012
Best Popular Actor	Mahun Diwana Tahun Diwani	Chhattisgarh Film Awards	2013 Good Actors.

Other awards

- Chhattisgarh Ratna Samman - Pandit Ravishankar Shukla University, Raipur - 2013
- Pratibha Samman - Chhattisgarh B. S. Central Committee - 2011
- Vipra Samman - Sarv Brahman Samaj - 2011
- Toy Award - JCI Raipur Metro - 2011
- Young Communicator Award - International School of Business and Media - 2010
- Young Communicator Award - Symmbiosis Institute of Media and Communication - 2009
- Honour - Tamil Nadu Hindi Sahitya Academy

Anuj Sharma was listed by the Times of India among the Kings of the Provinces when they published a special report in connection with the 100 years of Indian Cinema celebrations, placing him among the stalwarts of Indian cinema such as M. G. Ramachandran, N. T. Rama Rao and Mohanlal.
