= Khubchand Baghel =

Indian freedom fighter and politician

Member of Parliament, Rajya Sabha
- In office 1965–1968
- Constituency: Madhya Pradesh

Member of Madhya Pradesh Legislative Assembly
- In office 1952–1962
- Constituency: Dharsiwa

Personal details
- Born: July 19, 1900 Pathri, Raipur district, Central Provinces and Berar, British India
- Died: February 22, 1969 (aged 68) Raipur, Madhya Pradesh, India
- Occupation: Politician; Freedom fighter Social reformer

Khubchand Baghel (19 July 1900 – 22 February 1969) was an Indian freedom fighter and politician from the present-day state of Chhattisgarh. He is considered one of the early proponents of a separate Chhattisgarh state. He represented the Dharsiwa Assembly constituency in the Madhya Pradesh Legislative Assembly during the 1950s. He also contributed to rural education and social reform. He served as a Member of Parliament in the Rajya Sabha, the upper house of the Indian Parliament, from 1965 to 1968.

== Early life ==
Baghel was born on 19 July 1900 in Pathri, a village near Siliyari in Raipur district, into a farming family. His father's name was Jodhavan Prasad, and his mother's name was Kekati Bai. After passing the medical examination in Nagpur in 1925, he was appointed as an Assistant Medical Officer.

== Freedom movement ==
Khubchand Baghel started participating in the Indian independence movement during his student days. In 1921–22, he was inspired by Gandhi's Non-cooperation movement and left his medical studies to join the freedom movement, promoting the cause in villages across Raipur district.

In 1930, he participated in the Salt Satyagraha after resigning from his government job. In 1931, he took part in the Jungle Satyagraha and was imprisoned along with his fellow protesters. He was arrested again in 1932 for supporting the boycott of foreign cloth during Swadeshi movement.

== Work ==
After his release from prison in 1933, Baghel began working for Harijan (Dalit) upliftment following Mahatma Gandhi's call. He was appointed secretary of the Provincial Harijan Sevak Sangh by the Congress committee. A keen writer, Baghel authored plays such as Karamchadha, Janrail Singh, Unch-Neech, and Ledga, through which he addressed social evils and promoted the spirit of patriotism.

He focused on issues related to rural development, education, and social upliftment. In 1962, Baghel, with the help of local farmers, established a school in Siliyari village. The school, named after him as Khubchand Baghel Government Higher Secondary School, caters to students from nearby rural areas.

In 1967, Khubchand Baghel publicly voiced the demand for a separate Chhattisgarh state during a gathering in Rajnandgaon, becoming one of the earliest figures to articulate this vision. In the mid-1960s, Khubchand Baghel founded the Chhattisgarh Bhratri Sangh to promote regional unity. As a member of the Central Provinces and Berar Assembly, he had earlier raised the demand for separate statehood for Chhattisgarh. He also established the Chhattisgarh Mahasabha to advocate for the region's interests.

== Politics ==
In 1946, Khubchand Baghel was elected unopposed from Raipur Tehsil in the Congress elections. He was appointed as the Chairman of the Tehsil Executive Committee and a member of the Provincial Executive Committee. After independence, he was appointed Parliamentary Secretary in the provincial government.

Baghel was elected as a Member of the Madhya Pradesh Legislative Assembly from Dharsiwa constituency in 1952 and again in 1957.

He served as a Member of the Rajya Sabha after being elected in 1965 and remained active in politics until 1968.

== Death ==
Khubchand Baghel died of a heart attack on 22 February 1969.

== Recognition ==
Some government schemes have been named after Baghel. In 2025, the state government of Chhattisgarh launched the Khubchand Baghel Kisan Vidyut Sahayata Yojana to support farmers with electricity needs. The Dr. Khubchand Baghel Swasthya Sahayata Yojana was also launched to provide healthcare assistance to residents.

The Dr. Khubchand Baghel Krishak Ratna Award, named after him, is awarded by the state government to farmers in Chhattisgarh who have made notable contributions to agriculture.
