= Hadh Kar Di Aapne =

2000 Indian film by Manoj Agrawal

- DVD cover
- Directed by: Manoj Agrawal
- Written by: Anwar Khan (dialogues)
- Screenplay by: Rajiv Kaul; Praful Parekh
- Story by: Satish Jain
- Produced by: Rajeev Anand; Rakesh Malhotra
- Starring: Govinda; Rani Mukerji; Johnny Lever; Paresh Rawal
- Cinematography: Nirmal Jani
- Edited by: Arun-Shekhar
- Music by: Songs: Anand Raj Anand; Background score: Surinder Sodhi
- Distributed by: T-Series
- Release date: 14 April 2000
- Running time: 129 mins
- Country: India
- Language: Hindi
- Budget: ₹8 crore
- Box office: ₹20 crore

Hadh Kar Di Aapne (transl. You have crossed the limits) is a 2000 Indian Hindi-language comedy film directed by Manoj Agrawal. The film stars Govinda and Rani Mukerji. Upon release, the film was a commercial success.

== Plot ==
Raj aka Raju is a detective who is hired to help his friend Sanjay prove that his wife is having an extramarital affair so that he can divorce her. Sanjay's wife Anjali also suspects that her husband is cheating and hires her friend Anjali to seek proof of an extramarital relationship to facilitate an easy divorce. The couple has long been separated, each knowing that their spouse has moved to Europe with their boyfriend/girlfriend.

In Europe, detective Raju meets the other Anjali, and they fall in love but get into a fight later on, because Raj thinks that Anjali is already married with his friend Sanjay, which Anjali tries to explain to him that she is not married. Later, Sanjay and Anjali come across each other and learn of their mistakes and start thinking about Raj and Anjali. On the other hand, both Raj and Anjali returned from the Europe tour and decided to go their own way, as they still think that both are married. Raj returned back to his house whereas Anjali returned back to her house. Mr. Khanna and Mrs. Khanna parents of Anjali, decided to marry their daughter off. There came Prakash Chaudhary and Bhaidas Bhai as caterers and tent decorators. They learn that Anjali is about to marry someone else, but she loves Raj. So, they called Raj and asked him to come to Anjali's house. Finally, Anjali and Raj wed after many comical turns at the wedding venue.

== Cast ==
- Govinda in multiple roles as
  - Raj Malhotra "Raju"
  - Raju's father
  - Raju's mother
  - Raju's sister
  - Raju's grandfather
  - Raju's grandmother
- Rani Mukerji as Anjali Khanna
- Nirmal Pandey as Sanjay Khanna, Raj's friend.
- Ritu Shivpuri as Anjali Khanna, Anjali's friend.
- Satish Kaushik as Prakash Choudhury
- Johnny Lever in a dual role as
  - Advocate Lever Sr. (father)
  - Advocate Lever Jr. (son)
- Paresh Rawal as Bhaidas Bhai
- Tinnu Anand as Mr. Khanna
- Smita Jaykar as Mrs. Khanna
- Helen Brodie as Mona
- Tannaz Irani as Mrs. Bhaidas
- Rakesh Bedi as Chelaramani
- Bharat Kapoor as Mr. Sharma
- Avtar Gill as Mr. Bakhiyani
- Himani Shivpuri as Mrs. Bakhiyani
- Navneet Nishan as Mrs. Choudhury
- Viju Khote as Anjali's uncle

== Production ==
=== Casting ===
Mahima Chaudhry was originally offered the female role but had to turn down due to scheduling conflict. Rani Mukerji later received the role accepted it.

== Soundtracks ==
Lyrics by legendary Anand Bakshi

Hadh Kar Di Aapne

Soundtrack album by Anand Raaj Anand
- Released: 2000
- Genre: Feature film soundtrack
- Label: T-Series

The soundtracks of this film has been composed by Anand Raj Anand.

| Title | Singer(s) |
|---|---|
| "Bekaraar Main Bekaraar" | Sonu Nigam |
| "Hadh Kar Di Aapne" | Udit Narayan, Kavita Krishnamurthy |
| "Kudi Kanwaari Tere Pichchhe Pichchhe" | Jaspinder Narula |
| "Mujhe Kuchh Tumse Hai Kehna" | Udit Narayan, Vibha Sharma |
| "Oye Raaju Pyaar Na Kariyo" | Anand Raj Anand |
| "Phir Tote Se Boli Maina" | Udit Narayan, Anuradha Paudwal, Vinod Rathod, Sudesh Bhosle |
| "Turi Ruri Rappa" | Anand Raj Anand, Anuradha Paudwal, Vinod Rathod, Vibha Sharma, Mohammad Aziz |

== Reception ==
Syed Firdaus Ashraf of Rediff.com gave a positive review, writing, "On the whole, Hadh Kar Di Aapne is entertaining and keeps you interested in the script."

In a retrospective review in 2021, Tiasa Bhowal of India Today wrote that the film is "replete with sexist and racist jokes." She further wrote, "The film is boring in most parts, and it lacks minimum logic. It is a comedy film that also fails to evoke humour. Can it get any worse?"

== Remake ==
A remake of the film is in the works with Manoj Agarwal having written the script already and casting underway.
