= Ishq (1997 film) =

1997 Indian film by Indra Kumar

- Promotional Poster
- Directed by: Indra Kumar
- Written by: Tanveer Khan (dialogues)
- Screenplay by: Praful Parikh; Rajiv Kaul
- Story by: Praful Parikh; Rajiv Kaul
- Produced by: Gordhan Tanwani
- Starring: Aamir Khan; Ajay Devgn; Juhi Chawla; Kajol
- Cinematography: Baba Azmi
- Edited by: Hussain A. Burmawala
- Music by: Songs: Anu Malik; Background Score: Surinder Sodhi
- Production company: Baba Films
- Distributed by: Eros International
- Release date: 28 November 1997
- Running time: 168 minutes
- Country: India
- Language: Hindi
- Budget: ₹11 crore
- Box office: ₹45.61 crore

Ishq (transl. Love) is an Indian 1997 Hindi-language masala film directed by Indra Kumar. It stars Aamir Khan, Ajay Devgn, Juhi Chawla and Kajol along with Dalip Tahil, Sadashiv Amrapurkar, Johnny Lever and Mohan Joshi in supporting roles. The music was composed by Anu Malik.

Ishq released on 28 November 1997 and emerged as a major commercial success at the box office, grossing over ₹500 million (US$5.2 million) worldwide, ranking as the third highest-grossing Hindi film of the year. The film received mixed-to-positive reviews from critics upon release, with praise for its humor, soundtrack, costumes and performances of the cast, but criticism for its story and screenplay.

Ishq earned Amrapurkar a nomination for Best Villain at the 43rd Filmfare Awards. The film was remade in Kannada as Snehana Preethina (2007). The comedy track was reused in the Tamil film M. Kumaran Son of Mahalakshmi (2004).

== Plot ==
Ranjit Rai and Harbans Lal Saxena are wealthy businessmen who harbor a strong disdain for the poor. Ranjit's son, Ajay, reconnects with his childhood friend Raja, a working-class mechanic, while Harbans's daughter, Madhu, is close friends with Kajal, who also comes from a modest background. Hoping to unite their families, Ranjit and Harbans deceitfully obtain Ajay and Madhu's signatures on a marriage certificate and send Ajay to meet Madhu at Harbans's estate in Ooty.

Kajal and Raja travel there as well, leading to Ajay falling in love with Kajal and Raja with Madhu. Upset by this development, the fathers attempt to bribe Raja and Kajal to step away from the relationships. When unsuccessful, they arrange to have them harmed. Once the children learn of this, they refuse to separate.

The fathers then pretend to approve of the couples’ choices. During preparations for Raja and Madhu’s engagement, Kajal is abducted. Raja rescues her, but their private interaction is secretly photographed. These images are later used to falsely suggest an intimate relationship between the two. During the engagement, the photos are presented, and Kajal’s uncle falsely testifies to their authenticity. Ajay and Madhu, convinced by the evidence, end their relationships with Kajal and Raja.

Matters escalate when Ajay and Madhu believe that Kajal is pregnant with Raja’s child. They announce plans to marry each other. Kajal, overwhelmed, attempts suicide but is stopped by Raja. In an effort to demonstrate the deception, Raja stages a similar scenario by pretending to attack Madhu, prompting Ajay to comfort her—mirroring the original incident with Kajal.

Raja is arrested, and Kajal pleads for his release. The fathers agree on the condition that Kajal and Raja permanently leave the country. During Ajay and Madhu's wedding, Ajay’s uncle, Lambodar, presents photographs of Ajay comforting Madhu after the staged incident. He reveals that Raja recreated the earlier situation to expose the manipulation. Kajal's uncle confesses that he was paid to lie.

Ajay and Madhu reconcile with their partners and rush to stop Kajal and Raja, who are about to leave by ship. They arrive in time to reunite with them. The fathers, having witnessed the consequences of their actions, apologize and acknowledge their mistake, stating that their true wealth lies in their children. The four are reunited.

== Cast ==
- Aamir Khan as Raja/Ranjit Rai/Ghost/Demon
- Ajay Devgan as Ajay Rai
- Juhi Chawla as Madhu Lal
- Kajol as Kajal
- Johnny Lever as Ajay's maternal uncle
- Sadashiv Amrapurkar as Ranjit Rai
- Dalip Tahil as Harbans Lal
- Mohan Joshi as Kajal's paternal uncle
- Tiku Talsania as Gaitonde
- Anant Mahadevan as Brijesh Lal
- Yunus Parvez as Parsi Baba
- Razzak Khan as Nawab sahab/Nawab Shah Nawab Naadin Dhinnadin Changezi/Naadin Dindadindi Nawab Sahab Changezi From Agra
- Deepak Shirke as Damliya
- Deven Verma as Behram/Behri dear/Belly Dear
- Ghanashyam Nayak as ACP Balram Gulati, IPS
- Shwetha Menon as dancer
- Achyut Potdar as Barrister Gokhale
- Fatima Sana Shaikh as child playing in Kajal's arms
- Goolshan Mazdiasni as Aunty/Shirin
- Dharam Adhikari as Car Driver Bahadur
- Shamsuddin as Aladdin

== Production ==
=== Development ===
Director Indra Kumar initially planned Ishq in 1991 with Aamir Khan and Pooja Bhatt, but the project was shelved due to personal issues between the actors. Boney Kapoor later suggested Sanjay Kapoor and Vivek Mushran, but Kumar was not keen and instead made Raja (1995). He revived Ishq in 1996 with Khan, Ajay Devgn, Juhi Chawla, and Kajol in the lead roles.

=== Casting ===
Karisma Kapoor declined the film as she did not wish to work opposite Ajay Devgn, while Madhuri Dixit opted out due to scheduling conflicts. Amitabh Bachchan was signed for a role uniting the couples post-intermission but left due to creative differences; the character was later dropped. Ishq was Kumar’s first film without Madhuri Dixit and marked his second collaboration with Aamir Khan after Dil (1990), and his first with Devgn. It also remains the only film to star both Kajol and Juhi Chawla.

=== Filming ===
Principal photography for Ishq commenced in 1996, with shooting locations including Mumbai and Nashik, Maharashtra.

== Soundtrack ==
The soundtrack of Ishq was composed by Anu Malik, with lyrics by Rahat Indori and Javed Akhtar. The album emerged as a commercial success, selling approximately 3 million units and becoming the sixth highest-selling Bollywood soundtrack of 1997. The song "Neend Churai Meri" later inspired the track "Maine Tujhko Dekha" in Golmaal Again (2017), composed by Malik's nephew Amaal Mallik. There’s also an unreleased song, “Tu Jhootha” in the album.

	Title	Singer(s)	Lyrics	Length
1.	"Neend Churayee Meri"	Kumar Sanu, Udit Narayan, Alka Yagnik & Kavita Krishnamurthy	Rahat Indori	05:47
2.	"Dekho Dekho Jaanam"	Udit Narayan, Alka Yagnik	Rahat Indori	05:14
3.	"Ishq Hua Kaise Hua"	Udit Narayan, Vibha Sharma	Javed Akhtar	07:34
4.	"Humko Tumse Pyaar Hai"	Abhijeet, Anu Malik	Anu Malik	05:08
5.	"Mr. Lova Lova"	Udit Narayan, Abhijeet Bhattacharya, Sudesh Bhosle, Poornima & Kavita Krishnamurthy	Dev Kohli	05:25
6.	"Ishq Hai Ishq Hai"	Jayshri Shivram	Dev Kohli	05:29
7.	"Mr. Lova Lova" (Remix)	Udit Narayan, Abhijeet Bhattacharya, Sudesh Bhosle, Poornima & Kavita Krishnamurthy	Dev Kohli	06:35
8.	"Kaise Kahoon Kaise Ho Tum" (Unused)	Kumar Sanu, Vibha Sharma	Javed Akhtar	06:25
9.	”Tu Jhootha” (Unreleased)	Udit Narayan, Alka Yagnik, Abhijeet, Sadhna Sargam	Javed Akhtar	07:45

== Reception ==
=== Box office ===
Ishq emerged as a commercial success at the box office. According to Box Office India, the film earned a net collection of ₹24.93 crore in India, making it the third highest-grossing Hindi film of 1997, behind Dil To Pagal Hai and Border. The worldwide gross amounted to approximately ₹45.61 crore.

=== Critical reception ===
Anupama Chopra, writing for India Today, described the film as "a relentless assault on the senses," yet acknowledged that "the director's conviction in his patently absurd tale glues you to your seat, wide-eyed and grinning."

== Accolades ==
Ceremony	Category	Recipient(s)/Nominees(s)	Result	Ref.
43rd Filmfare Awards	Best Villain	Sadashiv Amrapurkar	Nominated	
4th Screen Awards	Best Actor	Aamir Khan	Nominated	
4th Screen Awards	Best Female Playback Singer	Kavita Krishnamurthy for "Mr. Lova Lova" (Ankhiyaan Tu Mila Le)	Nominated	
1st Zee Cine Awards	Best Film	Ishq	Nominated	
1st Zee Cine Awards	Best Actor	Aamir Khan	Nominated	
1st Zee Cine Awards	Best Actress	Juhi Chawla	Nominated	
1st Zee Cine Awards	Best Supporting Actor	Ajay Devgn	Nominated	
1st Zee Cine Awards	Best Supporting Actress	Kajol	Nominated	
1st Zee Cine Awards	Best Villain	Sadashiv Amrapurkar	Nominated	
1st Zee Cine Awards	Best Comedian	Johnny Lever	Nominated	
1st Zee Cine Awards	Best Music Director	Anu Malik	Nominated	
1st Zee Cine Awards	Best Art Direction	Nitin Chandrakant Desai	Nominated	
1st Zee Cine Awards	Best Action	Veeru Devgan	Nominated	
