= Rajaji (film) =

- Directed by: Vimal Kumar
- Written by: Satish Jain
- Produced by: Vimal Kumar
- Starring: Govinda; Raveena Tandon
- Cinematography: Anil Dhanda
- Edited by: Prakash Dave
- Music by: Anand–Milind; Vishwajeet Mukherjee
- Release date: 21 May 1999 (India)
- Country: India
- Language: Hindi

Rajaji is a 1999 Indian Hindi-language comedy film produced and directed by Vimal Kumar and starring Govinda and Raveena Tandon. The film was a box office failure.

== Plot ==
Shivnath (Kadar Khan), his wife Parvati (Aruna Irani) and son Rajaji (Govinda) live in a village. Parvati favours her son a lot, against the wishes of her husband. Raja is lazy and wants to have an easy life, presuming that if he marries a rich woman then he will not have to work. Because of this, Rajaji goes to Mumbai with his uncle Shadilal (Satish Kaushik) to find a rich girl.

In Mumbai, Rajaji sees Payal (Raveena Tandon) in a fancy car that drives into a large estate. He assumes that Payal must be very rich and begins a relationship with her. After their wedding, Rajaji realises that Payal was not actually rich and that she is the daughter of the estate's gardener Pratap Singh (Mohan Joshi). Rajaji angrily denounces his wife and father-in-law and runs back to his home from Mumbai, where his parents reject him. He then returns to his wife and tries to apologise, however he is ridiculed by his father-in-law who is now rich having won the lottery. Dejected, Rajaji begins working in the factory of Dhanpat Rai, the previous employer of Singh, where he becomes an honest and hardworking man. Eventually, he wins back both his wife and father-in-law and earns the respect of his parents once again by becoming a better man.

== Cast ==
- Govinda as Rajaji
- Raveena Tandon as Payal
- Shakti Kapoor as Dhanpat Rai
- Ranjeet as Makhanlal
- Mohan Joshi as Pratap Singh
- Divya Dutta as Sonia
- Mushtaq Khan as Kalicharan aka Kadwa
- Guddi Maruti as Kalicharan's Wife
- Razak Khan as Bulldozer
- Satish Kaushik as Shaadilal
- Dinesh Hingoo as Seth Karodimal
- Kader Khan as Shivnath
- Aruna Irani as Parvati (Mrs. Shivnath)
- Yunus Parvez as Factory Manager
- Laxmikant Berde as Babaji

== Soundtrack ==
The movie featured 8 songs, composed by Anand–Milind and Vishwajeet Mukherjee. The lyrics were written by Sameer.

Rajaji

Soundtrack album by Anand–Milind Vishwajeet Mukherjee
- Released: 1999
- Genre: Feature film soundtrack
- Length: 41:07 Min
- Label: His Master's Voice

Tracklist
No.	Title	Artist(s)	Length
1.	"Raja Chalo Akele Mein"	Kumar Sanu & Alka Yagnik	4:58
2.	"Sunday Ki Raat Thi"	Kumar Sanu & Sapna Mukherjee	5:04
3.	"Tere Pyar Ne (female)"	Alka Yagnik	5:10
4.	"Rajaji Rajaji"	Vinod Rathod	5:35
5.	"Resham Wale Kurte Pe"	Udit Narayan	4:56
6.	"Rut Naii Naii"	Udit Narayan & Anuradha Paudwal	5:47
7.	"Tere Pyar Ne (male)"	Udit Narayan	5:16
8.	"Saansuji"	Poornima	4:55
