= Sondur River =

River in Chhattisgarh, India

Coordinates: 20°40′N 82°01′E

Sondur River is a tributary of Mahanadi and located in Chhattisgarh, India. The river originates from village Navrangpur located in Koraput District of Orissa and meets the Pairi river near Malgaon. Sondur dam is built across this river with the assistance of World Bank near Gram Machka in Dhamtari district. The river flows through Sitandi sanctuary before merging with Mahanadi.
