= Vibha Sharma =

Indian popstar (born 1982)

Alyssia Vibha Sharma
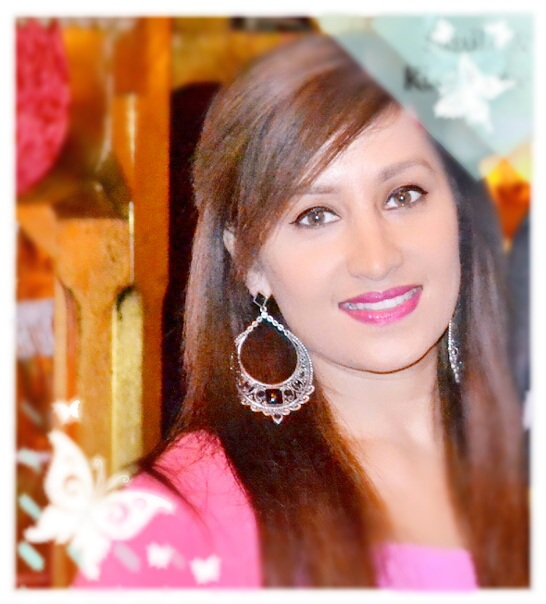
- AVS1

Background information
- Born: 15 January 1985 (age 41); London, England
- Genres: Bollywood, Hindi and regional songs, Playback, Indian pop
- Occupation: Singer
- Instrument: Vocals
- Years active: 1997–present

Alyssia Vibha Sharma is an Indian singer who released her first album in the 1990s. She made her foray into Indian pop domain with her debut album Mehndi (2000), by Saregama, which was well received and was one of the top three best selling private albums of that year. The title song "Mehandi Lagaoongi Main" became a superhit.

== Early life and background ==
Alyssia Vibha Sharma was born and brought up in London and hails from a Hindu Punjabi-Kashmiri Pandit background who won a singing competition in which more than 3000 South-East Asians from all over Europe had participated.

As a result, she took to learning Indian classical music under the tutelage of Parshottam Kapila in London, and later on, when she came to India she continued her training under the guidance of Pandit Ajay Pohankar, Geeta Prem (sister to singer Jagjit Singh), amongst other gurus.

Aside from her music accomplishments, Sharma has also done a BSc(Hons) from a university in London as well as post graduate certification qualifications.

== Career ==
Sharma started her career in Bollywood when she got her first break with Anu Malik, who, once having heard her in London, offered her to sing for two songs in Ishq (1997).

Bulandi, Hadh Kar Di Apne, Dil Dhoondhta Hai were other feathers in her cap, and she also sang "Vaishnva Jana To" for Kamal Hassan's controversial film Hey Ram. In addition, she has sung for Tamil, Bhojpuri and Punjabi films.

She did some more playback singing before launching her first album with Anand Raj Anand titled Mehndi. This was one of the few private albums that gained a high level of sales around the millennium era and was one of the top three best selling private albums in India. She also sang a Tamil song for Kartik Raja, son of Ilaiyaraaja, Inde Siripinai, which was criticized for wrong pronunciation but despite this, the song was at No.1 in the South Indian music charts for several weeks and later Kartik Raja was quoted to say "I have received a lot of positive feedback from music lovers asking me to work with Vibha Sharma more often".

She is known in the UK as Alyssia Sharma, working with renowned Punjabi DJ's and producers Panjabi Hit Squad, releasing an album self-titled Alyssia, which was one of the top five best-selling albums of the year. Three songs off the album reigned at the No.1 spot on all the primary Asian music charts within UK and Europe. Sharma was also nominated in the category of 'Best Female Singer' for the UK AMA awards for Deewana.

Sharma has been performing all over UK and Europe since the release of Deewana. Some of her more prestigious appearances have included the Viva La Glam show sponsored by MAC Make Up company in Toronto, Canada and Apple Store Bollywood Themed Carnival, Regent Street, London.

Sharma released videos for two tracks on her album, "Deewana" and "Tera Pyar Soneya Veh". She featured on Ms.Scandalous' 2008 album and video, AAG, thereafter sang a duet with Raghav; "Thoda Thoda" and released a video of a live rendition of "Rab Rakha" in 2012, recorded for Panjabi Hit Squad's album.

== Filmography ==
Year	Film	Title	Music Director
1997	Ishq	"Ishq Hua", "Kaise Kahoon Kaise Ho Tum"	Anu Malik
1998	Naam Iruvar Namakku Iruvar (Tamil)	"Intha Siru Pennai"	Karthik Raja
1999	Prem Shastra	"Balle Balle Hey Hey"	Suman Gopal
1999	Kahani Kismat Ki	"Aao Banalein Hum"	Dilip Sen Sameer Sen
2000	Hadh Kar Di Aapne	"Mujhe Kuchh Tumse Hai Kehna"	Anand Raj Anand
2000	Bulandi	"Teri Meri Ik Jind"	Kumar Heera
2000	Hey Ram	"Vaishnav Jana To"	Ilaiyaraaja
2000	Dil Dhoondta Hai	"Haye Mohabbat Ki Jadugiri"	Anu Malik
2000	Aaj Ka Ravan	"Haathon Ki Mehndi"	Pappu Pawan
2001	Kaboo	"Gori Gori Chamke Jawani"	Sukhwinder Singh
2013	Pehchaan 3D	"Tera Pyar Soniya Ve"	Panjabi Hit Squad

== Albums ==
- Mehndi
- Alyssia
- Deewana
