= Murrum Silli Dam =

- Location within Chhattisgarh
- Country: India
- Location: Dhamtari District
- Coordinates: 20°32′17″N 81°39′42″E
- Status: Operational
- Construction began: 1914
- Opening date: 1923

Dam and spillways
- Type of dam: Embankment, earth-fill
- Impounds: Sillari River
- Height: 34.15 m (112 ft)
- Length: 2,591 m (8,501 ft)
- Dam volume: 1,619,000 m^{3} (2,117,572 cu yd)
- Spillway capacity: 1,132 m^{3}/s (39,976 cu ft/s)

Reservoir
- Total capacity: 165,340,000 m^{3} (216,256,555 cu yd)
- Active capacity: 161,913,000 m^{3} (211,774,209 cu yd)
- Surface area: 25 km^{2} (10 mi^{2})

The Murrum Silli Dam or Babu Chhotelal Shrivastav Dam, also spelled Madam Silli and Mordem Silli, is an earth-fill embankment dam on the Sillari River, a tributary of the Mahanadi in central eastern India. It was built under the supervision of British Raj governor Madam Silli for whom it was originally named. It is located in Dhamtari District of Chhattisgarh. Built between 1914 and 1923, it is the first dam in Asia to have siphon spillways. Madamsilli is about 95 km from Raipur. It is one of the most prominent architectural marvels in Chhattisgarh. Its primary purpose is irrigation.

On 3 June 1929 R.S. Rajendranath Sur (government civil engineer, Central province) was awarded by George V the title of "Rai Saheb" for his exemplary works on Murrum Silli Dam.
