= Nitin Dubey =

Indian Singer and composer (born 1981)

- Born: 3 July 1981 (age 45); Raigarh, Chhattisgarh, India
- Genres: Indian music, Chhattisgarhi music
- Occupations: Singer, composer, actor, lyricist
- Years active: 2001–present
- Labels: Ultra Media & Entertainment, Shemaroo Entertainment, Saregama
- Spouse: Sanju Dubey
- Website: nitindubeyofficial.com

Nitin Dubey (born 3 July 1981) is an Indian singer, composer, actor, and lyricist. Born in Raigarh, Chhattisgarh. Dubey is known for his work as a composer, vocalist, music director, and playback singer in Chhattisgarh cinema and as a performer at various national level music festivals and bhajan programs.

Dubey's best-selling albums include Hay Mor Chandni and Tain Deewani Main Deewana, while his best-selling songs include "Raigarh Wala Raja" "Hay Re Mor Kochaipan," and "Ka Tai Rup Nikhare Chandani." Dubey's awards include a Best Playback Singer Award for his work on the film Mr. Majnu, and several folk music awards including the Matni Ratna Award, the Kala Amnol Ratna Award, the Sai Aradhana Samman Award, and the Chhattisgarh Melody King Award. In 2023, he also received the Chhattisgarh Ratna award for his contributions to Chhattisgarhi music.

== Early life ==
Nitin Dubey was born on 3 July 1981, in Raigarh, Chhattisgarh, India, to Parmhans and Kalindi Dubey. He began singing when he was 7 years old by performing a patriotic song at his school. Subsequently, he began competing in school music contests and state-level music competitions.

As a child, his musical influences were the bhajans sung by his mother, the folk music performed by his father, and the songs of playback singer Kishor Kumar. He learned classical ragas from his elementary school teacher Gulabram Chauhan.

He went to the Maa Sarveshwari High School Raigarh for elementary and high school, and then to the Natwar Higher Secondary School Raigarh for intermediate school. Dubey graduated from the Degree College Raigarh at Guru Ghasidas University, Chhattisgarh.

== Career ==
Dubey released his debut album, Tain Deewani Main Deewana, in 2001. His first single on the album was "Manmohini He Gaon Ke Goriya." Subsequently, Dubey released several albums including Hay Mor Chandni in 2005. Dubey received the Mati Ratna Award from the Chhattisgarh Institute of Folk Art in 2008. The following year, he received the Kala Amnol Ratna Award from the Chhattisgarh Institute of Folk Art.

Dubey is also known as a bhajan singer. He released the Hindi bhajan albums Chalo Shirdi Dham and Sancha Hai Maa Ka Darbar. In 2013, Dubey collaborated with Bollywood singers Suresh Wadekar and Sadhna Sargam on the bhajan album Sai Ka Sajda. After the release of this album, Dubey began performing as a Sai Bhajan singer at live performances and bhajan programs across India. Dubey's other bhajan works include "Hanuman Chalisa."

Dubey received the Sai Aradhana Samman Award from the Orisa Sai Trust in 2017.

In 2022, Dubey released the album Hay Re Mor Neelpari, which featured Chhattisgarhi singer Sharmila Biswas. In November of the same year, he also released the single "Barbad 2," which was a sequel to his earlier single, "Barbad Kar Dehe Mola." Dubey also received the Chhattisgarh Melody King Award from the Indian Pharmacists Association in 2022.

Dubey has worked as a music director in the Chhattisgarh film industry for movies including Mr. Majnu, and Dil Pardesi Hoge Re. In 2023, he received the Best Playback Singer Award for his song "Ka Tain Nikhare Chadhaini" in the film Mr. Majnu. He also served as a playback singer in the film Chal Hat Konho Dekh Lihi, directed by Satish Jain.

Dubey has also appeared as an actor in music videos for his songs such as "Raigarh Wala Raja." His songs have been streamed in multiple countries.

Dubey has also performed at various state-level music festivals such as Chakradhar Samaroh in 2011, 2012, and 2016, Bhoramdev Mahotsav in 2018 and 2019, Jajwalyadev Mahotsav in 2018, and Rajyotsava Mahotsav in 2022. In 2023, Dubey performed at the closing ceremony of the Chitrakote Mahotsav festival, the Pali Festival, Lok Madai Dongargaon, Naranyanpur Mavli Mata, the Kelo Mahotsav festival, and the Mainpat Mahotsav festival. In the same year, Dubey also gave a free live performance of bhajans at the Navadha Ramayana. Overall, he has been credited with performing more than 2,000 stage shows.

Dubey also received the Kelo Dharohar Samman and Chhattisgarh Ratna awards in 2023. In 2023, Dubey also became the first Chhattisgarhi artist to receive the Sai Shri Samman award. Dubey released the song "Gonda Tola Re," which he performed with Sharmila Biswas, in 2023. He also released the bhajan "Mere Man Mein Haim Ram" to coincide with Ram Navami 2023.

== Controversy ==
In 2022, Nitin Dubey's name was misused by a local artist who made false claims saying he would appear at a musical event to gather larger crowds at a musical event in Tamnar.

Dubey made a report to the Raigarh SP after criminals used false IDs bearing Dubey's name and image to defraud people and collect money.

== Discography ==
=== Albums ===
- Tain Deewani Main Deewana (2001)
- Hay Tore Bindiya (2002)
- Padosin Turi (2003)
- Tain Mor Prem Deewani (2004)
- Hay Mor Chandni (2005)
- Chandraseni Amar Katha 1 (2006)
- Chandraseni Amar Katha 2 (2007)
- Nitin Dubey Ganesh Bhajans (2008)
- Chalo Shirdi Dham (2009)
- Sancha Hai Maa Ka Darbar (2010)
- Sai Ka Sajda (2013)
- Nitin Dubey Hindi Deshbhakti Geet (2020)

== Bhajans ==
Title	Year	Ref.
"Chandraseni Amar Katha"	2006	
"Tu Bhaj Le Sai Praabu Ka Naam"	2009	
"Tu Sai Sai Bol Re"	2013	
"Sai Ka Sadja"	2013	
"Pratham Vandana"	2020	
"Hanuman Chalisa"	2021	
"Sancha Hai Ek Tera Hi Daarbar Maa"	2021	
"Gauri Ke Lala Ho"	2021	
"Ganpati Ganraj"	2021	
"Chhattisgarh Ke Chhattis Devi"	2021	
"Bhole Ka Jogi"	2021	
"Kanwar Wala"	2022	
"Tola Sumar Sumar Ke Manavanv"	2022	
"Darbar Jana He"	2022	
"Mere Man Mein Hain Ram"	2023	

== Singles ==
Title	Year	Album	Ref.
"Manmohini He Gaon Ke Goriya"	2001	Tain Deewani Main Deewana	
"Hay Mor Chandni"	2005	Non-album single	
"Hay Re Mor Kochaipan"	2019	Non-album single	
"Tor Bar Mor Dil Bekraar"	2019	Non-album single	
"Ka Tai Roop Nikhare Chandaini"	2019	Non-album single	
"O Jaaneman O Dilruba"	2020	Non-album single	
"Hay Tor Bindiya"	2020	Hay Tor Bindiya	
"Dhire Dhire"	2020	Non-album single	
"Hay Re Tor Kasam"	2020	Non-album single	
"Raigarh Wala Raja"	2021	Non-album single	
"Bachpan Ka Pyar"	2021	Non-album single	
"Chanda Re"	2021	Non-album single	
"Chandni 2"	2021	Non-album single	
"Gulmohar"	2021	Non-album single	
"Dhadkan Ke Saaj"	2021	Non-album single	
"Barbad Kar Dehe Mola"	2021	Non-album single	
"Mata De Turi"	2022	Non-album single	
"Hay Re Mor Mungakadi"	2022	Non-album single	
"Dil Ke Dhadkan"	2022	Non-album single	
"Naach Mor Jaan"	2022	Non-album single	
"Tor Barat Lahun"	2022	Non-album single	
"Hay Re Mor Neelpari"	2022	Non-album single	
"Dil De De Durugwali"	2022	Non-album single	
"Barbad 2 Tain Mola Bhul Ja"	2022	Non-album single	
"Gonda Tola Re"	2023	Non-album single	
"Mere Man Me Hain Ram"	2023	Non-album single	
"Dil Ma Feeling"	2023	Non-album single	
"Raigarh Wala Raja 2"	2023	Non-album single	
"Rimjhim Pani Barkha Rani"	2023	Non-album single	
"Hay Re Mor Mandakini"	2023	Non-album single	

== Awards ==
- Mati Ratna Award (2008)
- Kala Anmol Ratna Award (2009)
- Sai Aradhna Samman Award (2017)
- Chhattisgarh Melody King Award (2022)
- Sai Shri Samman (2023)
- Kelo Dhahrohar Samman (2023)
- Best Playback Singer (2023)
- Chhattisgarh Ratna (2023)
