= Pandit Sundarlal Sharma (Open) University =

University in Chhattisgarh, India

- Type: State university
- Established: 2005
- Affiliations: UGC, DEC
- Chancellor: Governor of Chhattisgarh
- Vice-Chancellor: V.K. Saraswat
- Location: Bilaspur, Chhattisgarh, India
- Campus: Urban
- Website: www.pssou.ac.in

Pandit Sundarlal Sharma (Open) University Chhattisgarh, Bilaspur (PSSOU) is a state university located in Bilaspur, Chhattisgarh, India. It is a state open university offering distance education.

== History ==
Vice Chancellors
Dr. T. D. Sharma, 2 March 2005 – 22 January 2010; Dr. A. R. Chandraker, 23 January 2010 – 2 February 2015; Dr. B. G. Singh, 3 February 2015 to 03 March, 2025; Dr. V. K. Saraswat, 30 July 2025 to Present

Pandit Sundarlal Sharma (Open) University (PSSOU) Chhattisgarh, Bilaspur was established by the Chhattisgarh legislature in the 55th year of the republic of India under. The Pandit Sundarlal Sharma (Open) University Chhattisgarh Act, 2004. It was named after Sundarlal Sharma, a freedom and social justice fighter of the Chhattisgarh region. Dr. T.D. Sharma joined this university as the first Vice-Chancellor on 2 March 2005 while Dr. Sharad Kumar Vajpai takes office as Registrar on 15 March 2005. Dr. B. G. Singh was reappointed VC of the university for another term.

The university was formally inaugurated by the former Vice Prime Minister, Govt. of India and Leader of Opposition in Lok Sabha, Shri Lal Krishna Advani at a function presided over by the honorable Chief Minister of Chhattisgarh Dr. Raman Singh attended by Shri Ajay Chandrakar (Minister of Higher Education), Shri Amar Agrawal (Minister of Finance) along with large number of dignitaries and guests.

== Faculties and Regional Centres ==
The university is structured into the following faculties:

- Faculty of Arts ( Department of English, Hindi, Library Science )
- Faculty of Science and Technology
- Faculty of Social Science(Political Science, Public Administration, Sociology, Social Work etc. )
- Faculty of Commerce
- Faculty of Education
- Faculty of Computer Science (DCA, PGDCA, and BCA)
- Faculty of Yoga, Jyotish and Vastu

Regional centres were established at Bilaspur, Raipur, Ambikapur, Durg, Jashpur and Jagdalpur.

== Administration ==
The university is administered by an Executive Council, Academic Council, Planning Board, Departments, Board of Studies and the Finance Committee. The present Vice Chancellor is Dr. B.G. Singh and Dr. Indu Anant is Registrar.

== Executive Council of the University ==
- Dr. V. K. Saraswat, Vice Chancellor/Chairman
- Prof. Jitendra Kumar Srivastava, Member
- Mr. Sant Kumar Netam, Member
- Mr. Gulab Kamro, Member
- Smt. Raj Laxmi Selat, Member
- Mr. Ashok Choubey,Additional Commissioner, Government of Chhattisgarh, Department of Panchayat and Rural Development Member
- Mr. Taran Prakash Sinha, Joint Secretary, Govt. of Chhattisgarh, Sports and Youth Welfare Department, RaipurMember
- Prof. Meeta Jha, Member
- Mr. Chandrashekhar Dewangan, Member
- Mr. Dheeraj Wankhede, Member
- Dr. Jaipal Singh Prajapati, Member
- Mr Bhuwan Singh Raj, Secretary
