= Sundarlal Sharma =

Indian activist

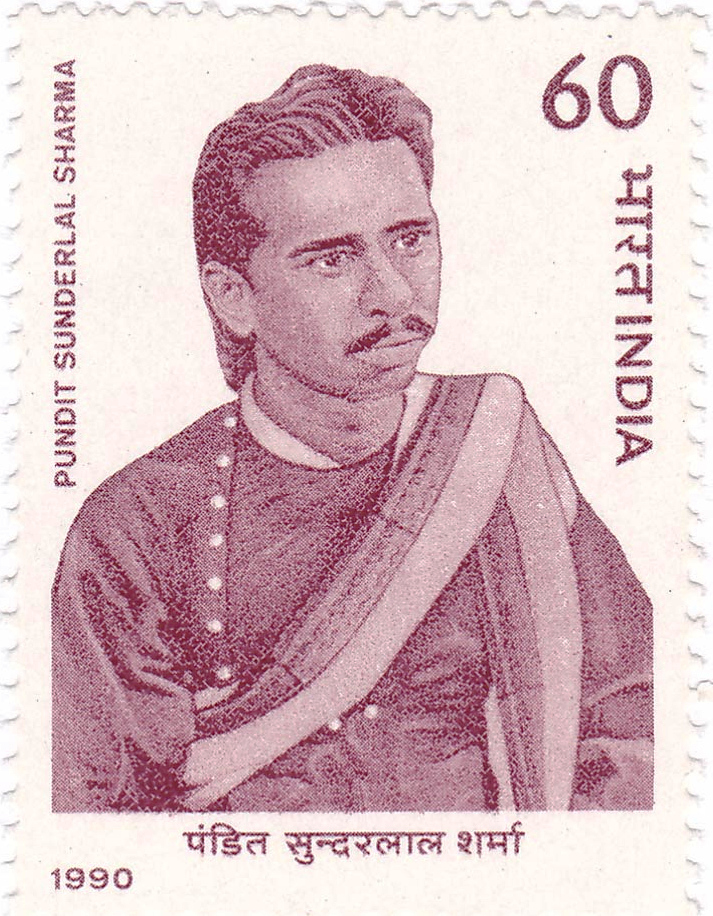
Post stamp released from Indian government in 1990

Pandit Sundarlal Sharma (21 December 1881 — 28 December 1940) was a key figure in the independence movement from Chhattisgarh. He was largely responsible for ushering in political and social consciousness to Chhattisgarh. In 1920, he started the canal satyagraha, also known as the Nahar satyagraha, at a village called Kandel in Dhamtari Tehsil. Chhattisgarh has a university in the name of Pandit Sundarlal Sharma.

== Biography ==
Pt. Sundarlal Sharma was born in a village of Chandrasur near Raipur and spent most of his life in Raipur. He was under influence of Mahatma Gandhi, and, in particular, he organized Gandhi's visit to Raipur in 1920. At the time, he has already been active in the local level politics, with the goal of implementing social reforms such as abolition of castes and integrating untouchables into society. Later, he entered politics at the national level and represented Madhya Pradesh in the Indian independence movement. He was acquainted with the leading Indian reformers of the time, including Gandhi, Madan Mohan Malaviya, and Lala Lajpat Rai.

In 1920, Sharma started the Kandel Nahar Satyagraha in Kandel, Dhamtari. This was an act of civil resistance against an irrigation tax by the British Raj.

In 1921-22 he was arrested by the authorities, which is considered to be the first arrest in Chhattisgarh related to the independence movement.
