= Sondur Dam =

Dam in India

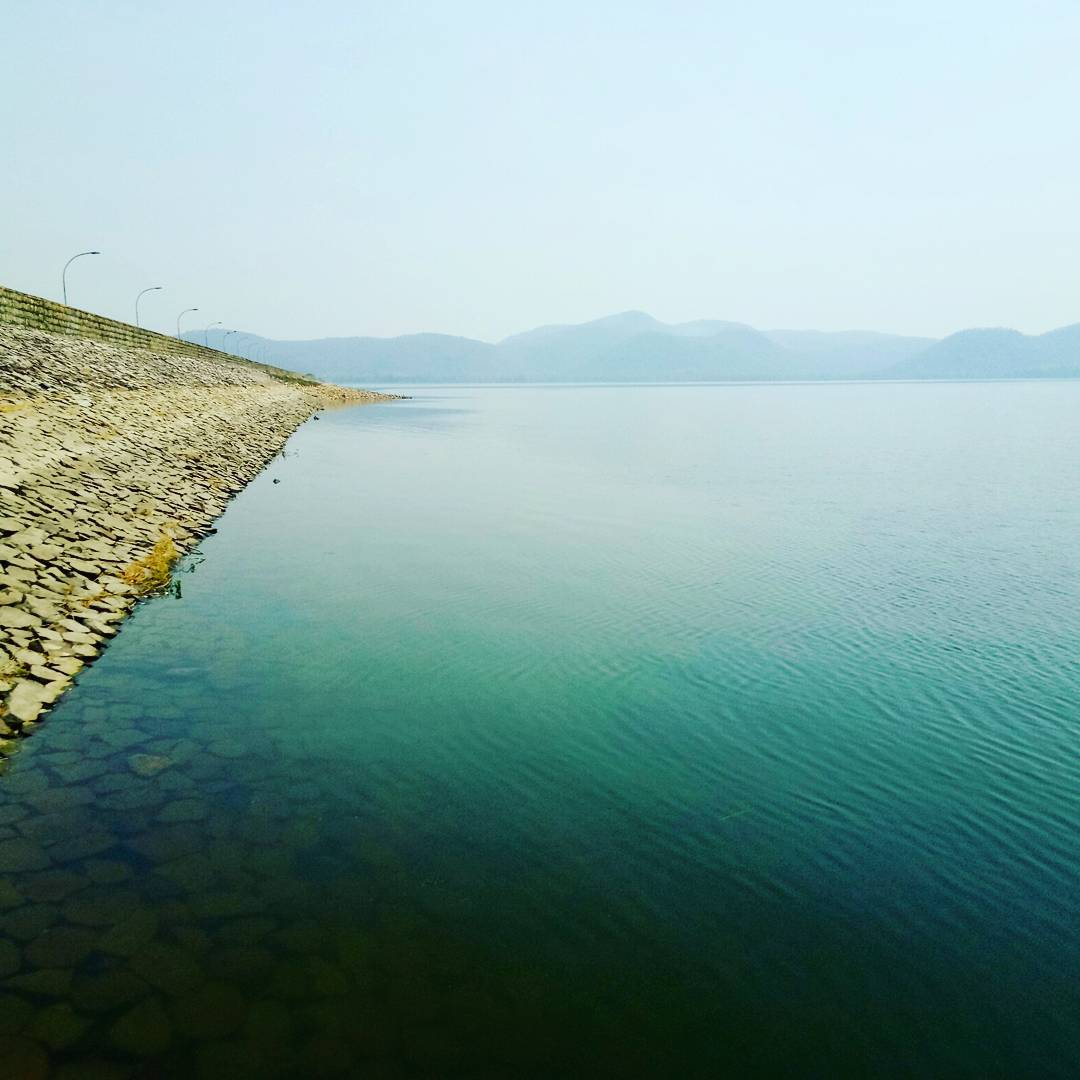
Sondur Dam, Nagri (C.G.)

Sondur Dam is a dam located in Dhamtari District of Chhattisgarh in India. It was constructed in 1988 across Sondur River. The catchment area of the Sondur river up to the dam is 518 km^{2}.
