= Kahi Debe Sandesh =

1965 film by Manu Nayak

- Theatrical release poster
- Directed by: Manu Nayak
- Written by: Manu Nayak
- Produced by: Manu Nayak
- Starring: Kan Mohan; Uma Rajoo; Surekha Parkar; Kapil Kumar; Ramakant Bakshi
- Edited by: Madhu Adhsule
- Music by: Malay Chakraborty
- Release date: 16 April 1965
- Country: India
- Language: Chhattisgarhi

Kahi Debe Sandesh (transl. Convey The Message) is a 1965 Chhattisgarhi film written, directed and produced by Manu Nayak. Dealing with contemporary social issues such as untouchability and caste discrimination, it became the first Chhattisgarhi-language film.

Manu realised the rising popularity of films made in regional languages after the success of Bhojpuri films. It was then he decided to make a film in the Chhattisgarhi dialect, based on the inter-caste affair between a scheduled caste boy and a brahmin girl, which was a taboo at that period of time in large parts of India. The film was initially criticised by some conservatives and politicians, leading to agitations at theatres and protest for banning the movie. However, progressive congress politicians Mini Mata and Bhushan Keyur spoke in favour and ultimately the then I&B minister, Indira Gandhi saw the movie and acclaimed it to be the film that promotes national integration.

The film was premiered on 16 April 1965 in Durg and Bhatapara but due to controversy, it was released later in Raipur only in the month of September. It ran till 8 weeks in Rajkamal (now Raj) talkies of Raipur.

== Plot ==
The story of the film is set in a village of Chhattisgarh (then Madhya Pradesh) which has prevalent caste discrimination. It starts with the landlord talking to the Purohit (Priest), and later with his wife Dulari regarding how he wants to take Charandas (who belongs to the [Satanami] community) to court for land acquisition. Fulwati (Charandas' wife) asks him to settle the matter instead of fighting over it. The Purohit on the other hand, tries to instigate differences between Satanami community among upper caste people through his preaching. But the kids in the village seems to question caste discrimination and discuss it in their school. After some years, Nayandas (son of Charandas) goes to Agriculture University for higher education & becomes good friends with Ravikant Tiwari.

Nayandas comes back to the village after completing his education, helping the community in farming practices re-unites with Rupa and Geeta (younger sisters of the landlord), his childhood friends. Nayandas and Rupa's childhood affection turns to love but they realize they belong to different communities. As their love for each other grows, Kamal Narayan Pandey, who envied their relationship, started to spread rumours the sisters that they were getting too old for marriage. Rumours spread like wildfire which made Rupa too sad to even step out of the house. The landlord is struggling to find perfect grooms for both of his sisters and the Purohit is delaying it even further because he is taking bribes from Kamal so he can marry Rupa. While Nayandas tries to make a co-operative society of all farmers in the village, his friend Ravikant Tiwari gets posted in the same village as a Doctor. On the other hand, Kamal tries to force Rupa to marry him and as she declines, Kamal again spreads rumours about the affair between Rupa and Nayandas, which is shameful for the society of the village. Nayandas marries Rupa at a temple in presence of Geeta and Dr Ravikant. They talk to their families and convince them on their ideas of relationship/marriage.

== Cast ==
- Kan Mohan as Nayandas
- Uma Rajoo as Rupa
- Surekha Parkar as Geeta

== Production ==
90 percent of the film was shot in Palari (now Balodabazar district), about 70 km from the capital, Raipur. The film was made in just 27 days in a budget of Rs 1.25 lakh only.

The record-breaking success of the first Bhojpuri film Ganga Maiyya Tohe Piyari Chadhaibo in 1962 inspired Manu Nayak to make a film in Chhattisgarhi dialect. He announced that he will be making a film. This news was published in all the popular film newspapers. Many days were spent in chaos. The question was about finance. Finally, Those brokers who financed Anupam had seen the honesty of Manu, giving them Rs 5000 each without interest. He also told about his idea of making film to Mahesh Kaul who liked it but asked him to scrap the idea and not to resign Anupam Chitra studio and he turned down the proposal. Manu on-boarded ‘Malay Chakraborty’ for music and ‘Hanumant Naidu’ for son-writing. He recorded the first song ‘Jhamkant Nadiya Bahini Lage’ with Mohammad Rafi. After recording the second song ‘Tor Pairing ke Jhanar Jhanar’, Manu went to Raipur to meet his friends. He was searching for a distribution manager and offered 60k in return for distribution rights in Chhattisgarh to a firm. Went back to Mumbai, selected actors for the film and finalised the locations. Equipments and cast of 12 arrived Raipur via train.

"I had seen it happening even in my own house. Whenever my friends from lower castes used to come to my home, my mother used to not say anything but soon after they had left she used to clean the entrance of the house. This and few other instances deeply affected me and I realized that until caste discrimination is addressed properly to the masses, society would not progress." Said Manu Nayak in an interview.

Manna Dey, Suman Kalyanpur, Meenu Purushottam and Mahendra Kapoor also sang songs in this film in a very small amount following Mohammad Rafi. Congress MLA from Palari, late Shri Brijlal Verma also helped Manu to arrange the shooting locations in the village itself. The first shot was taken at Vivekananda Ashram in Raipur. The film was extremely difficult to complete in limited expenditure. Lack of reels constrained the team to do lesser re-takes and due to which some of the songs has to be recorded in Mumbai using sets. Meanwhile, the song ‘Jhamkat Nadiya’ became a hit on radio and the film was released on 14 April 1965 in Durg's Prabhat Talkies. In Durg, the film ran without any controversy, then it was released in Bhatapara and after the settlement of all the disputes, when the film became tax free, it was screened in Rajkamal (today's Raj Talkies) of Raipur.

== Legacy ==
It is today regarded as a classic and trend-setter, which paved the way for Chhattisgarhi film industry and set an example for message-driven regional films.
