= Gangrel Dam =

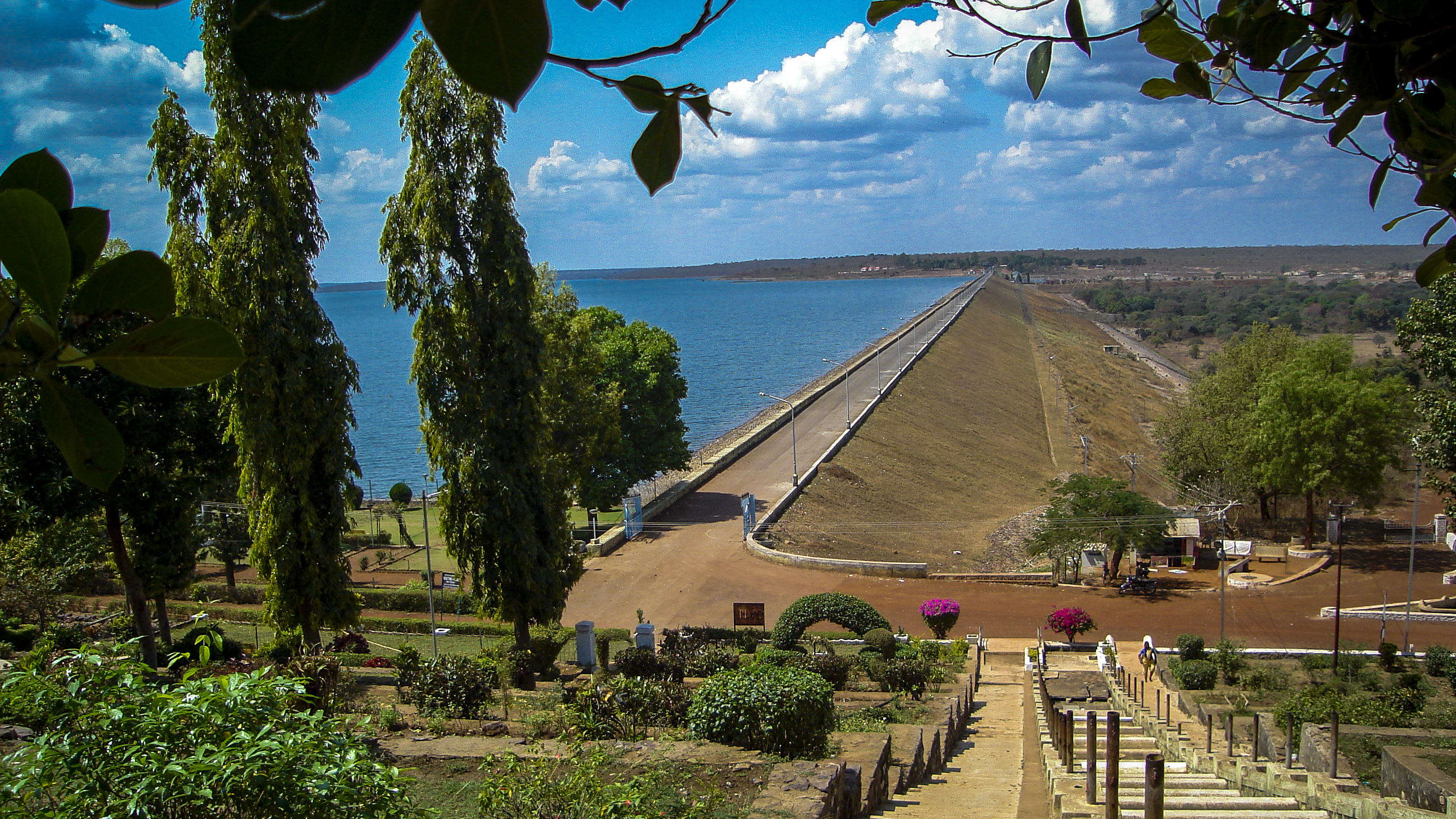

- Location within India
- Country: India
- Location: Dhamtari District
- Coordinates: 20°37′36″N 81°33′36″E
- Status: Operational
- Opening date: 1979

Dam and spillways
- Type of dam: Embankment, earth-fill
- Impounds: Mahanadi River
- Height: 30.5 m (100 ft)
- Length: 1,830 m (6,004 ft)
- Dam volume: 1,776,000 m^{3} (2,322,920 cu yd)
- Spillway capacity: 17,230 m^{3}/s (608,472 cu ft/s)

Reservoir
- Creates: Ravishankar Reservoir
- Total capacity: 910,500,000 m^{3} (1.190889039×10^{9} cu yd)
- Active capacity: 766,890,000 m^{3} (1.003054250×10^{9} cu yd)
- Surface area: 95 km^{2} (37 mi^{2})
- Normal elevation: 333 m (1,093 ft)

Gangrel Dam officially the Pandit Ravishankar Sagar is located in Chhattisgarh, India. It is built across the Mahanadi River. It is located in Dhamtari district, about 17 km from Dhamtari and about 90 km from Raipur. It is the longest & largest dam in Chhattisgarh. This dam supplies year round irrigation, allowing farmers to harvest two crops per year and key water supplier of Bhilai Steel Plant. The dam also supplies 10 MW of hydro-electric power capacity.

The chief Engineer of this project was Devraj.

Onakona is a popular tourist spot located on the banks of the reservoir.
