= Kurud =

- Town
- Location in Chhattisgarh, India Kurud (India)
- Coordinates: 20.83°N 81.72°E
- Country: India
- State: Chhattisgarh
- District: Dhamtari

Area
  - Total: 13.40 km^{2} (5.17 sq mi)
- Elevation: 298 m (978 ft)

Population (2011)
  - Total: 13,783
  - Density: 1,029/km^{2} (2,664/sq mi)

Languages
  - Official: Hindi, Chhattisgarhi
- Time zone: UTC+5:30 (IST)
- Postal code: 493663
- Vehicle registration: CG-05

Kurud is a town and a nagar panchayat in Dhamtari District in the Indian state of Chhattisgarh. Kurud Pin Code is 493663.

== Geography ==
Kurud is located at 20.83°N 81.72°E. It has an average elevation of 298 metres (977 feet). It is situated on the national highway 30 and nearly 53 km away from state capital Raipur. Kurud is one of the greatest mandi (market) where paddy is being sold by farmers.

== Demographics ==
As of 2001 India census, Kurud had a population of 11,469. Males constitute 50% of the population and females 50%. Kurud has an average literacy rate of 64%, higher than the national average of 59.5%: male literacy is 73%, and female literacy is 56%. In Kurud, 16% of the population is under 6 years of age.

== See also ==
- Bhakhara
