= Chhattisgarhi cinema =

Chhollywood
- Main distributors: Y.K.M. Brother Production House Sundrani Films N.MAHI FILMS

Chhattisgarhi cinema, also known as Chhollywood, refers to the film industry of Chhattisgarh state, Central India, or to films produced in the Chhattisgarhi language. It was established in 1965 with the release of the first Chhattisgarhi-language film, Kahi Debe Sandesh.

== History ==
Kahi Debe Sandesh was released in 1965. Directed and produced by Manu Nayak, it was a story of intercaste love; its release caused controversy, with Brahmins calling for a ban. The next Chhattisgarhi film to be released was Ghar Dwar in 1971, produced by Vijay Kumar Pandey. However, both films performed poorly at the box office.

On October 27, 2000, Mor Chhainha Bhuinya was released, the first Chhattisgarhi film since Ghar Dwar. The film was a major success, grossing over ₹20,000,000, recouping its budget of around ₹2,000,000.

Interest in the genre increased further in 2005 when Bhakla was released, featuring a song composed by Kalyan Sen and sung by Lata Mangeshkar. Later, Satish Jain produced Mayaa after watching the film. Films such as Mahun Deewana Tahun Deewani (Swapnil Film Productions) Tura Rikshawala, and Laila Tip Top Chhaila Angutha Chhap were released soon after.

Bhulan The Maze opened to international praise and won several awards. It became the first Chhattisgarhi movie to win a National Film Awards, winning Best Film in Chhattisgarhi at 67th National Film Awards.

Today Chhattisgarhi films often play in theatres outside of Chhattisgarh, especially in cities like Nagpur. The government of Chhattisgarh made a film policy to support Chhattisgarhi cinema. However, the support structure in the form of a subsidy remains unclear. The film makers are struggling to showcase their films due to an inadequate number of cinema halls in the state. The filmmakers want the state government to help penetrate smaller towns to increase viewership, as that will help recover the production cost. This is important as unlike in 2000s when an average of only 4 to 5 films were made annually, today 40 to 50 films are made annually. This has resulted in competition between films which affects their earnings.

== Notable people ==
- Anuj Sharma (actor)
- Nitin Dubey
- Satish Jain
