= Chhaya Verma =

Indian politician

Member of Parliament, Rajya Sabha
- In office 30 June 2016 – 29 June 2022
- Preceded by: Mohsina Kidwai
- Succeeded by: Rajeev Shukla
- Constituency: Chhattisgarh

Personal details
- Born: 18 May 1962 (age 64) Raipur
- Party: Indian National Congress
- Spouse: Dr. Dayaram Verma
- Parents: Lt. Ratan Lal Tikariha (father); Geeta Tikariha (mother)
- Education: B.A.
- Alma mater: Govt. J.M.P. College - Takhatpur, Bilaspur
- Profession: Politician
- As of 23 June, 2018 Source: ["Profile". Rajya Sabha.]

Chhaya Verma is an Indian politician from the state of Chhattisgarh who belongs to the Indian National Congress. She is currently the State Congress Secretary.

In June 2016, she was announced as the party's candidate for the Rajya Sabha biennial polls. On 3 June 2016 she was elected unopposed.
