= Dhamtari =

- City
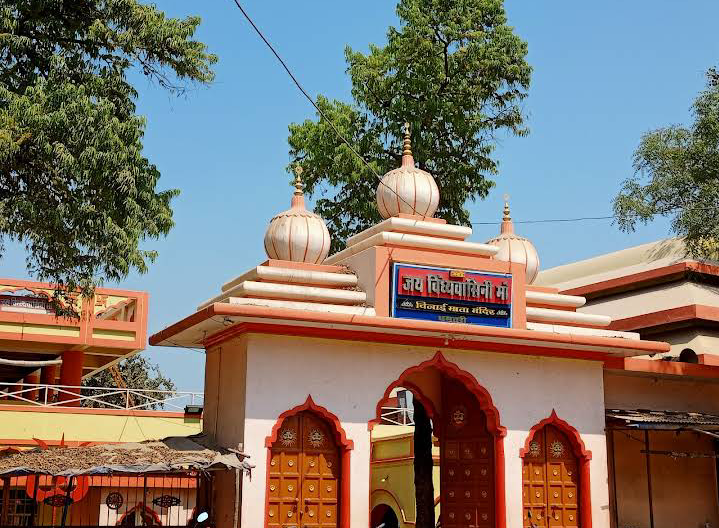
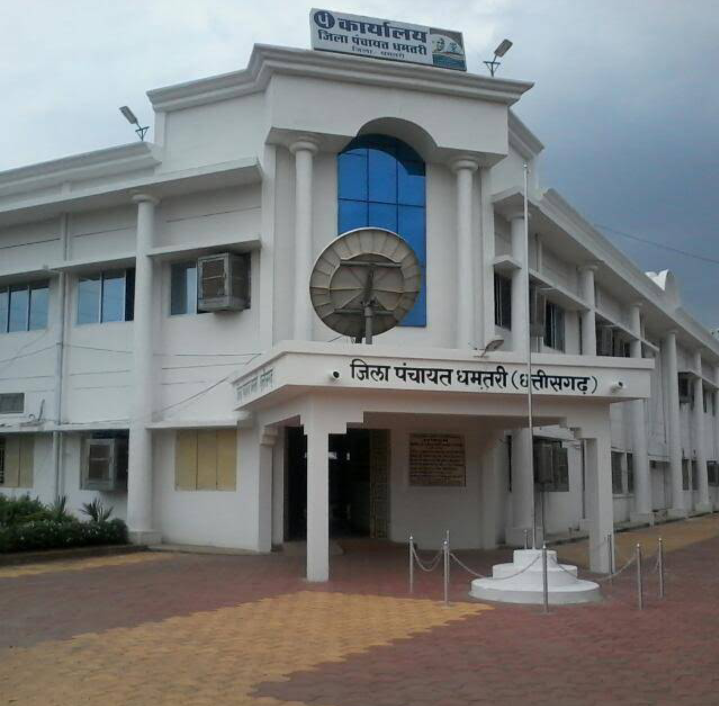
- Bilai Mata Mandir Jila Panchayat, Dhamtari

- Location in Chhattisgarh Dhamtari (India)
- Coordinates: 20.71°N 81.55°E
- Country: India
- State: Chhattisgarh
- District: Dhamtari

Government
  - Body: Nagar Nigam
  - Mayor: Jagadish Ramu Rohra (BJP)

Area
  - Total: 34.94 km^{2} (13.49 sq mi)
- Elevation: 317 m (1,040 ft)

Population (2011)
  - Total: 101,677
  - Density: 2,910/km^{2} (7,537/sq mi)
- Time zone: UTC+5:30 (IST)
- PIN: 493773, 4936XX,4937XX (Dhamtari)
- Vehicle registration: CG-05
- Website: www.dhamtari.gov.in

Dhamtari is a municipal corporation and headquarters of the Dhamtari district in the state of Chhattisgarh, India, which is part of the Mahasamund Lok Sabha constituency formed on 6 July 1998. The district is home to 3.13 percent of Chhattisgarh's total population.

== History ==
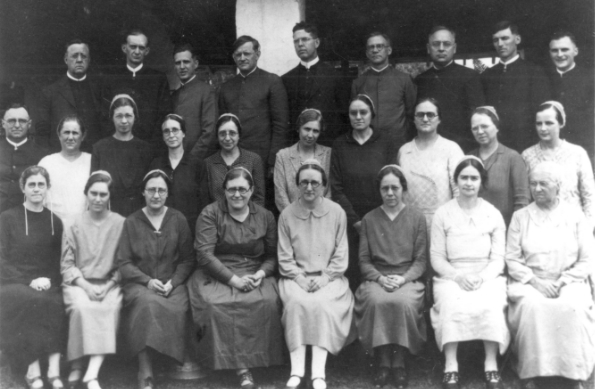
Missionaries in Dhamtari, India, 1932

Dhamtari's population was 17,278 in 1955. At that time, the town was part of Raipur District in the state of Madhya Pradesh. In 2000, it became part of the new Chhattisgarh state and headquarters for the Dhamtari tehsil. As a terminus of a narrow-gauge railway running 80 kilometres (50 miles) north of Raipur on the main Bombay-Calcutta line of the Bengal Nagpur Railway, Dhamtari became a trade centre. Goods shipped from there included timber, shellac, morabulum nuts, beedi leaves (for cigarettes), rice and animal hides.

The American Mennonite Mission was established in Dhamtari in 1899. By 1952 the mission had merged with the Mennonite Church in India (MC), which had its headquarters in Dhamtari. In 1955 the 558-member congregation was one of several missionary groups in Dhamtari, including the Dhamtari Christian Academy, Dhamtari Christian Hospital, the Samuel Burkhard Memorial Boys' Orphanage and a nursing school. At the present Dhamtari is a "Nagar Nigam". Dhamtari is also famous for its Marathi community which is one of the biggest gathering of Marathis in any state of India

== Geography ==
Dhamtari is in the fertile plains of Chhattisgarh. The district's total area is 4,084 square kilometres (1,577 sq mi), and it is about 317 meters (1,040 feet) above sea level. It is bordered by the Raipur and Durg districts to the north, the Gariaband district to the east, the Kondagaon district and the State of Orissa to the south and the Balod and Kanker districts to the west. The fertility of the land in the Dhamtari District is due to the Mahanadi River and its tributaries (Sendur, Pairy, Sondur, Joan, Kharun, and Shivnath). Dhamtari is situated 65 km from capital Raipur.

== Economy ==
Lead deposits exist in the district. Most of the city's workforce is involved in the timber industry or rice or flour milling (Dhamtari has more than 200 rice mills), with the chemical industry also a significant presence. The Ravishankar Sagar Dam (Gangrel Dam) irrigates nearly 57,000 hectares (140,000 acres) of land, and is the primary supplier of potable water to the state capital of Raipur and the steel plant at Bhilai. The dam is about 11 kilometres (6.8 mi) from the district capital. Asia's first siphon dam was built in 1914 at Madamsilli; the Sondhur and Dudhawa Dams are other important works.

== List of mayors ==
Term of office	Name	Party	Notes
1922-1926	Narayanrao Meghawale	Indian National Congress	
1932-1934	Natthurao Jagtabh	Indian National Congress	
1934-1936	Khammanlal Saw	Indian National Congress	
1936-1937	Babu Chotelal Shrivastava	Indian National Congress	
1937-1939	Babu Chhote Lal Shrivastava	Indian National Congress	
1941-1946	Ramgopal Sharma	Indian National Congress	
1946-1950	Giridhari lal mishra	Indian National Congress	
1951-1952	Ramgopal Sharma	Indian National Congress	Nominated
1952-1954	Radheshyam Khare	Bharatiya Jana Sangh	
1955-1957	Radheshyam Khare	Bharatiya Jana Sangh	
1969-1971	Hanuman Prasad Mishra	Bharatiya Jana Sangh	
1971-1974	Pandri Rao Pawar	Indian National Congress	
1984-1987	Karishn Kumar Dhandh	Indian National Congress	Nominated
1995-2000	Narayan Prasad Gupta	BJP	
2000-2005	Janki Pawar	BJP	
2005-2010	Tarachand Hinduja	BJP	
2010-2015	Narayan Prasad Gupta	BJP	
2015-2020	Archana Choubey	BJP	
2020-2025	Vijay Dewangan	Indian National Congress	
2025-	Jagadish Ramu Mehra	BJP	

== Education ==
Schools

- Anjuman Higher Secondary School,
- Azim Premji School, Shankardah,
- Delhi Public School
- Govt. Boys Higher Secondary School,
- Govt. Girls Higher Secondary School,
- Hari Om Higher Secondary School,
- Kendriya Vidyalaya
- Jawahar Navodaya Vidyalaya
- Mennonite Senior Secondary School,
- Model English Higher Secondary School,
- Nutan Higher Secondary School,
- Saraswati Shishu Mandir Higher Secondary School,
- Saraswati Shishu Vidya Mandir,
- Sarvoooodaayaa Hindi School,
- St. Marys English Medium School,
- St. Xaviers School,
- Vidya Kunj Memorial school.

Colleges

- Comp tech Degree College
- Genesis College
- Govt. Girls College
- Govt. P.G. College
- Govt. Polytechnic College
- KL College of Horticulture
- Vandemataram College

== Transport ==
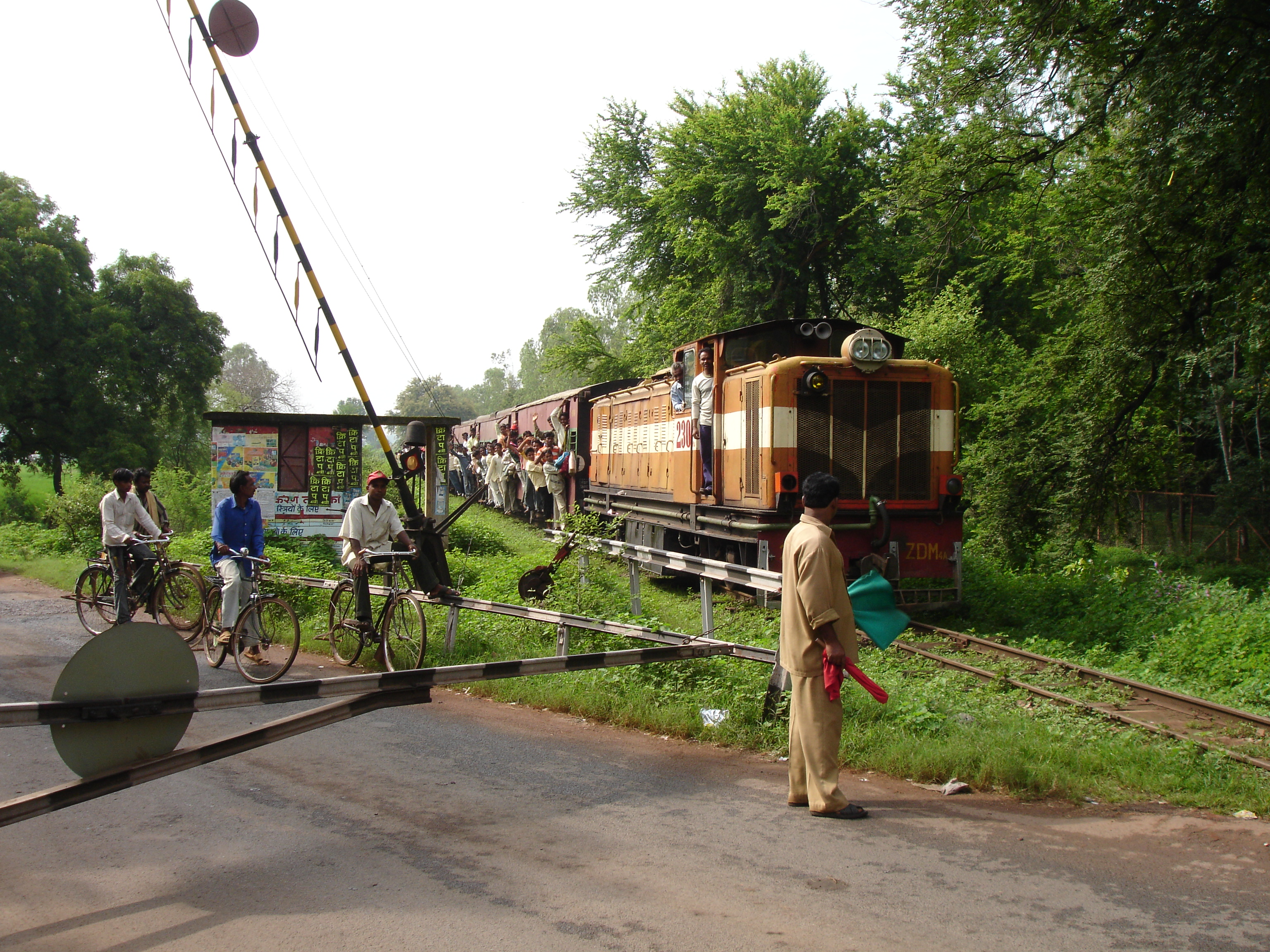
Dhamtari-Raipur narrow-gauge train

=== Railways and bus ===
Dhamtari situated at Raipur to Jagdalpur national highway National Highway 30 (India), where majorly flawless fast Bus services is available almost 24 hours in every 5–15 minutes. Raipur to Dhamtari narrow-gauge line, now defunct provided service to the area, soon to be replaced by broad-gauge railway tracks.

== Healthcare ==
- Dhamtari Christian Hospital (DCH)
- Dhamtari District Hospital (DDH)

== Media ==
Newspapers

- Prakhar Samachar

== Places of interest ==
- Gangrel Dam
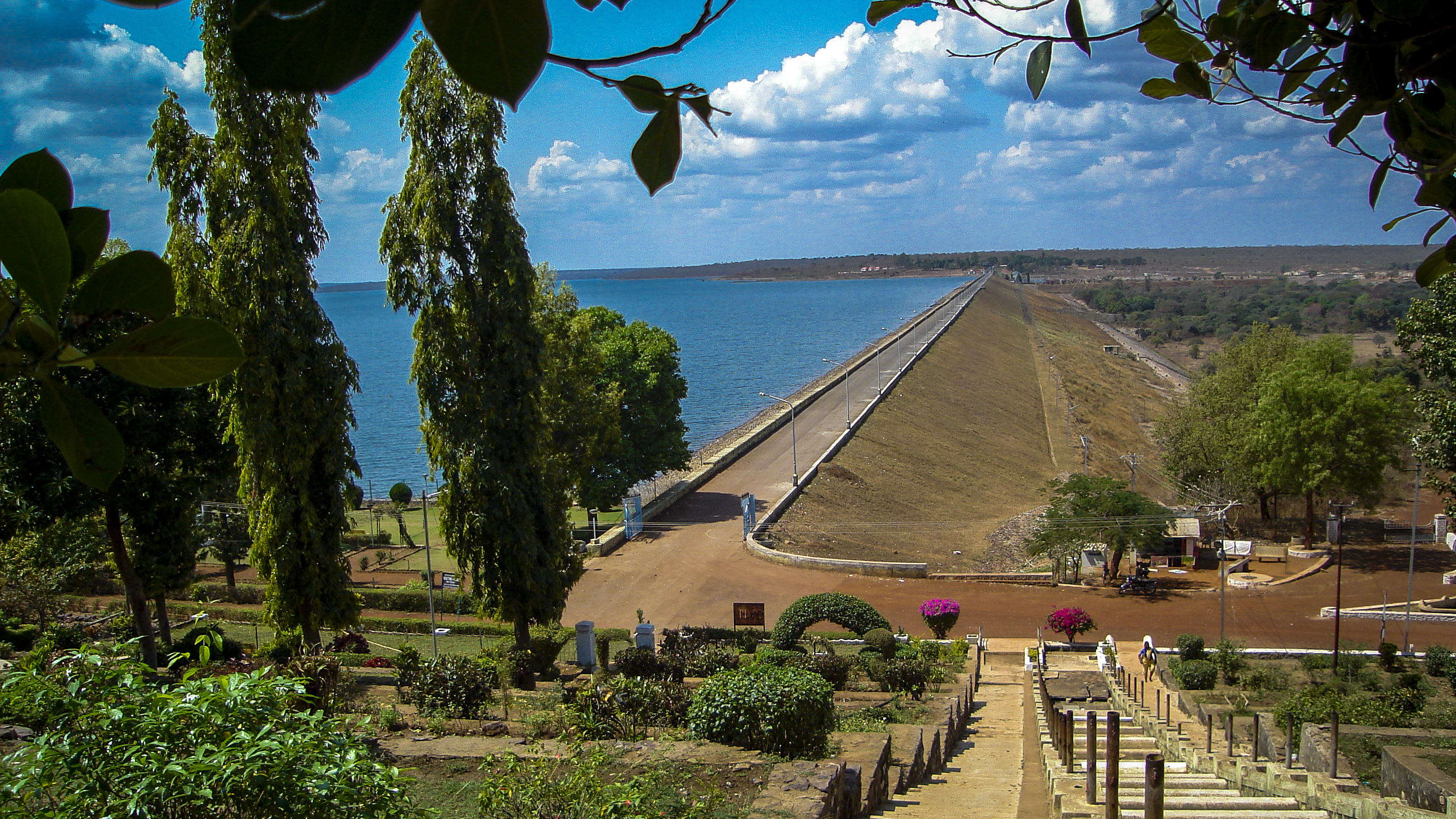
  Gangrel Dam
- Khubchand Baghel (Rudri) barrage
- Bilai Mata Mandir (Vindhyavasini Mata)

== Notable people associated with Dhamtari ==
- Babu Chhote Lal Shrivastava
