= Dhamtari district =

Coordinates: 20°42′26″N 81°32′59″E

- District of Chhattisgarh
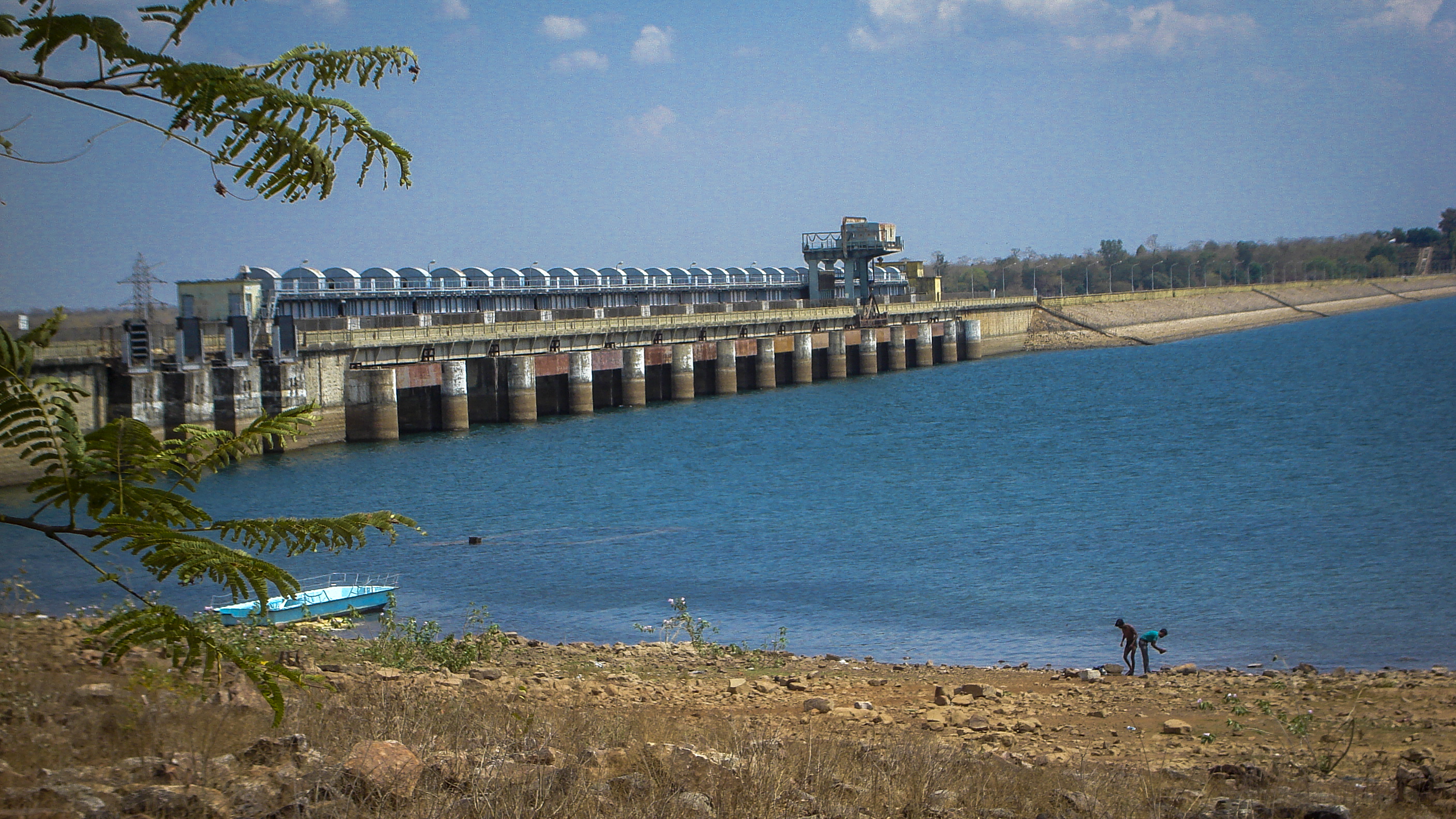
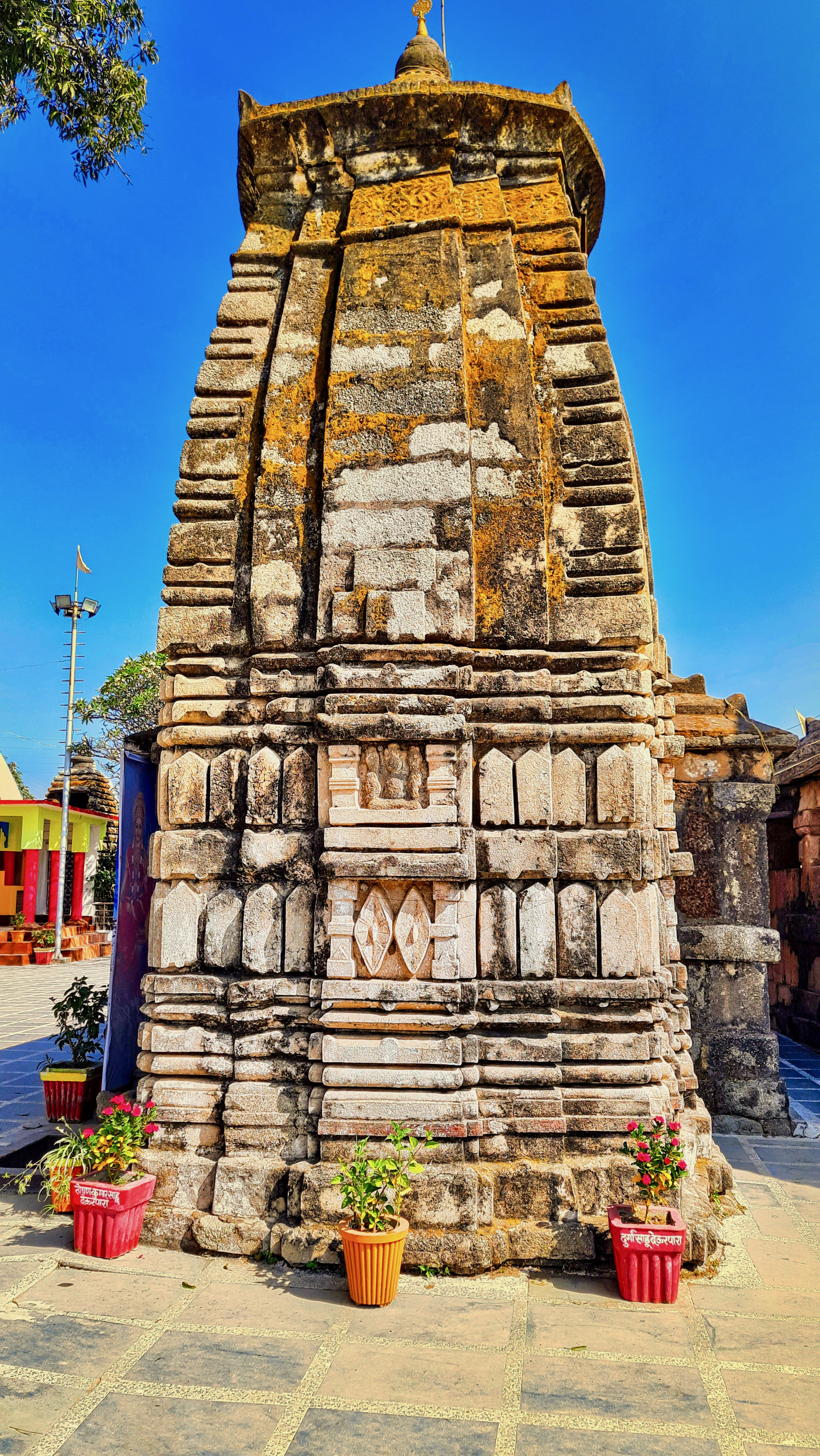
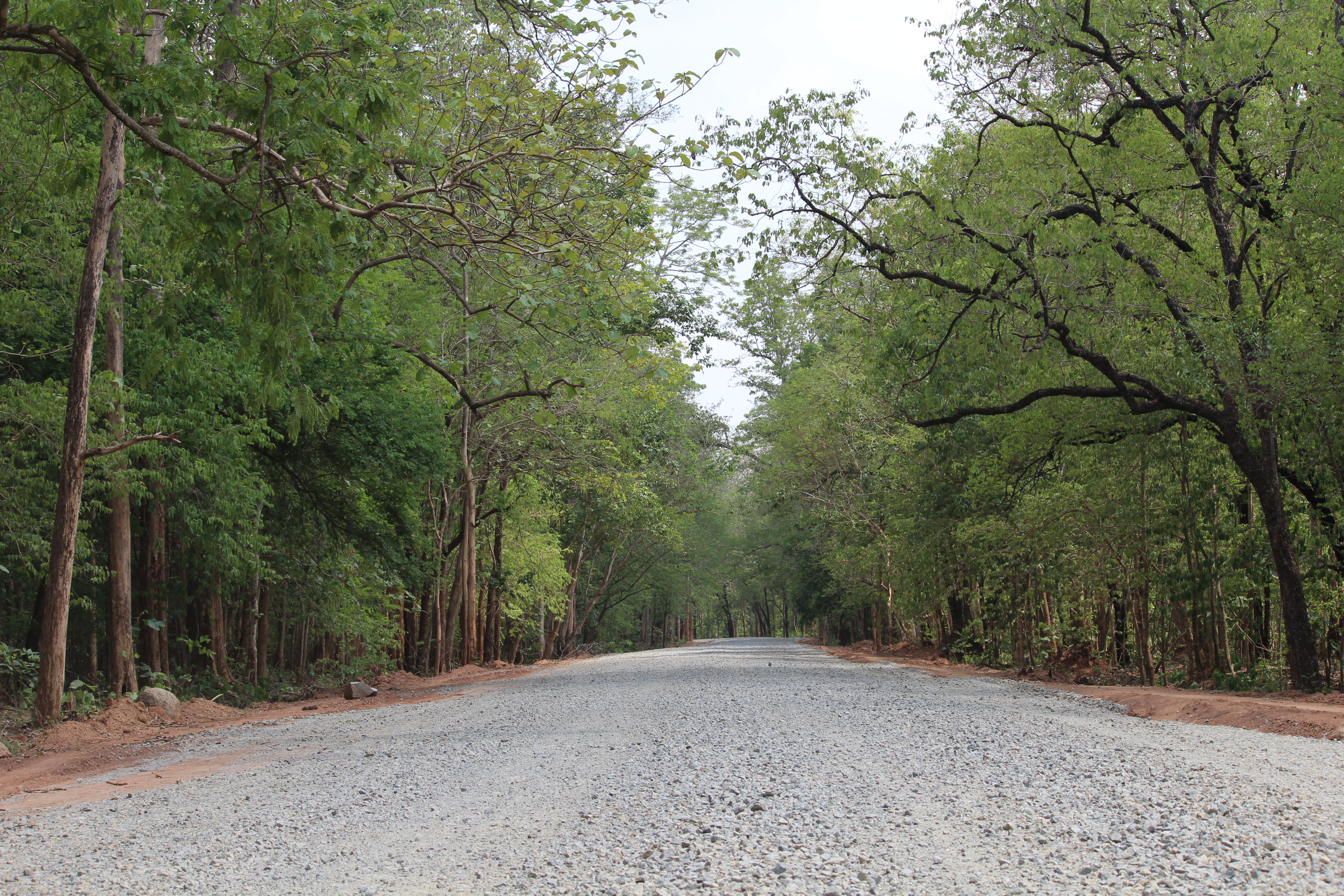
- Gangrel Dam Temple in Sihawa Sitanadi Wildlife Sanctuary
- Interactive map of Dhamtari district
- Country: India
- State: Chhattisgarh
- Headquarters: Dhamtari
- Tehsils: Dhamtari, Kurud, Nagri

Government
  - Lok Sabha constituencies: Mahasamund, Kanker
  - Vidhan Sabha constituencies: Dhamtari, Kurud, Sihawa

Area
  - Total: 4,084 km^{2} (1,577 sq mi)

Population (2011)
  - Total: 799,781
  - Density: 195.8/km^{2} (507.2/sq mi)

Demographics
  - Literacy: 90.00
  - Sex ratio: 1010
- Time zone: UTC+05:30 (IST)
- Major highways: NH-30
- Website: dhamtari.nic.in

Dhamtari district is a district of the Indian state of Chhattisgarh. This district is situated at 20°42' N latitude and 81°33' E longitude. Dhamtari district was officially formed on 6 July 1998 by trifurcating Raipur district into Raipur, Dhamtari and Mahasamund districts. The district headquarters is Dhamtari.

The present collector of Dhamtari is Sushree Namrata Gandhi.The present mayor of Dhamtari is Shri Vijay Dewangan.

== Etymology ==
Dhamtari derives from dhamma tarai, literally plain of Dhamma. The name is a hint at the area's Buddhist roots.

== Geography ==
The total area of the district is 4084 km², and its altitude is 305 m above sea level. The district borders Raipur and Durg districts to the north, Gariaband district to the east, Nabarangpur district of Odisha to the south, Kondagaon district to the southwest and Kanker and Balod districts to the west. The Mahanadi River is the principal river of this district, originating in the hills of Sihawa, and till this area it is named as Kankannadi, Chitrotpala, Neelotpala, Mandvahini, Jairath etc. Its tributaries are Seonath, Pairy, Sondur, Joan, Kharun and Shivnath. The fertility of lands of Dhamtari district can be attributed to the presence of these rivers. The chief crop of this region is paddy.

Dhamtari is situated approximately 80 kilometres (50 mi) south of Raipur on NH 30.

== Economy ==
Dhamtari has over 136 rice mills.

Ravishankar Sagar dam (Gangrel Dam) that irrigates almost 570 square kilometres of land and also acts as a main supply unit of safe drinking water resource for state capital Raipur as well as supply to Bhilai Steel Plant lies almost 11 km from the district capital. Two hydro-power plants of 10 MW and 1.2 MW are installed there.

Ravishankar Sagar dam that irrigates almost 57000 Hectare of land and also acts as a main supply unit of safe drinking water resource for state capital Raipur as well as supply to Bhilai Steel Plant lies at almost 11 km from the District capital. Work of 10 MW hydro-electric power plant is progressing and is likely to be completed very soon. Asia's first ever Siphon dam was built in the year 1914 at Madamsilli. Besides Madamsilli, Sondur dam, Dudhawa dam are the major projects.

Approximately 52 per cent of the geographic area is covered by forests. The district has a tropical climate.

== Demographics ==
Historical population
Year	Pop.	±% p.a.
1901	164,530	—
1911	197,779	+1.86%
1921	209,792	+0.59%
1931	230,637	+0.95%
1941	255,951	+1.05%
1951	276,762	+0.78%
1961	328,920	+1.74%
1971	410,189	+2.23%
1981	473,361	+1.44%
1991	587,679	+2.19%
2001	706,591	+1.86%
2011	799,781	+1.25%

Religions in Dhamtari district (2011)
Religion	Percent
Hinduism	97.18%
Islam	1.30%
Other (tribal religion)	0.46%
Jainism	0.45%
Other or not stated	0.61%
Distribution of religions

According to the 2011 census Dhamtari district has a population of 799,781, roughly equal to the nation of Comoros or the US state of South Dakota. This gives it a ranking of 485th in India (out of a total of 640). The district has a population density of 209 inhabitants per square kilometre (540/sq mi) . Its population growth rate over the decade 2001-2011 was 13.11%. Dhamtari has a sex ratio of 1010 females for every 1000 males, and a literacy rate of 90.0%. 18.65% of the population lives in urban areas. Scheduled Castes and Scheduled Tribes make up 7.32% and 25.96% of the population respectively.

Languages of Dhamtari district (2011)
1. Chhattisgarhi (92.6%)
2. Hindi (5.31%)
3. Others (2.06%)

At the time of the 2011 Census of India, 92.63% of the population in the district spoke Chhattisgarhi and 5.31% Hindi as their first language.

Out of the three assemblies in the district the Sihawa Constituency is inhabited by the majority of tribal all over the district with a significant majority population in the district, with a good population in Dhamtari and Kurud constituencies also.

Dhamtari, Kurud and Nagari are included in Dhamtari district as tehsils and blocks.

Dhamtari district falls between two Lok Sabha constituencies (Kanker and Mahasamund) and three assembly constituencies: Dhamtari, Kurud, and Sihawa.
