= List of institutions of higher education in Chhattisgarh =

This is an incomplete list of universities and colleges in Chhattisgarh, India.

== Universities ==
In Chhattisgarh there is one Central university, thirteen state universities and eleven private universities (see table below to view detailed list of universities).

University	Location	Type	Established	Specialization	Sources
Anjaneya University	Raipur	Private	2022	General, Engineering, MBA	
Asian Academy of Film & Television (AAFT University of Media and Arts)	Raipur	Private	2018	General	
Amity University, Raipur	Raipur	Private	2014	General	
Atal Bihari Vajpayee Vishwavidyalaya	Bilaspur	State	2012	General	
Ayush & Health Sciences University Chhattisgarh	Raipur	State	2009	Healthcare	
Shaheed Mahendra Karma Vishwavidyalaya	Jagdalpur	State	2008	General	
Chhattisgarh Kamdhenu Vishwavidyalaya	Durg	State	2012	Agriculture	
Chhattisgarh Swami Vivekanand Technical University	Bhilai	State	2004	Technology	
Dr. C. V. Raman University	Bilaspur	Private	2006	General	
Hemchand Yadav Vishwavidyalaya	Durg	State	2015	General	
Guru Ghasidas University	Bilaspur	Central	1983 (2009^{†})	General, Engineering	
Hidayatullah National Law University	Raipur	State	2003	Legal	
ICFAI University, Raipur	Dhamdha, Durg	Private	2011	General	
Indira Gandhi Krishi Vishwavidyalaya	Raipur	State	1987	Agriculture	
Rajkumari Indira Singh Kala Sangit Vishwavidyalay	Khairagarh	State	1956	Music	
ISBM University	Gariaband	Private	2016	General	
ITM University	Naya Raipur	Private	2014	General	
Kalinga University	Naya Raipur	Private	2005	General	
KK Modi University	Durg	Private	2018	General	
Kushabhau Thakre Patrakarita Avam Jansanchar Vishwavidyalaya	Raipur	State	2004	Journalism and Mass Communication	
Maharishi University of Management and Technology	Bilaspur	Private	2018	General	
MATS University	Raipur	Private	2006	General	
O.P. Jindal University	Raigarh	Private	2014	General	
Pandit Ravishankar Shukla University	Raipur	State	1964	General	
Pandit Sundarlal Sharma (Open) University	Bilaspur	State	2004	Distance education	
Sarguja University	Ambikapur	State	2008	General	
Shri Rawatpura Sarkar University	Raipur	Private	2018	General	
Dr. Shyama Prasad Mukherjee International Institute of Information Technology, Naya Raipur	Naya Raipur	State	2015	Information Technology	
Shaheed Nandkumar Patel University, Raigarh (C.G.)	Raigarh	State	2020	General	
Mahatma Gandhi Udyanikee and Vanikee Vishwavidyalaya, Patan Durg (C.G.)	Durg	State	2020	horticulture and forestry	

== General Degree Colleges ==
- Anjaneya University, Raipur, Chhattisgarh
- C.M. Dubey Postgraduate College, Bilaspur
- Durga Mahavidyalaya, Raipur
- Government Engineer Vishwesarraiya Post Graduate College, Korba
- Govt. Bilasa Girls P.G. College, Bilaspur
- Govt. E. Raghvendra Rao P.G. Science College, Bilaspur
- Govt. Jamuna Prasad Verma P.G. Arts and Commerce College, Bilaspur
- Government College, Dipka
- Government Minimata Girls College, Korba
- Jyoti Bhushan Pratap Singh Law College, Korba
- Kamla Nehru College, Korba
- Kirodimal Govt. Arts and Science College, Raigarh
- G D Rungta College of Science & Technology, Bhilai
- St. Thomas College, Bhilai
- Govt.V.Y.T.P.G.Autonomous College, Durg
- Government Mukut Dhar Pandey College, Katghora, Chhattisgarh
- Government College, Karrtala
- Government College, Pali
- Government College, Barpali
- Government College, Bhaisma
- Govt. Gundhadhur Postgradute College, Kondagaon, Chhattisgarh
- GOVT. MAYURDHWAJ MAHADANI RAJA P.G. COLLEGE, CHAMPA, DIST.-JANJGIR-CHAMPA (C.G.)

== Engineering ==
The engineering colleges in the state include:

NIT Raipur

- Indian Institute of Technology Bhilai
- International Institute of Information Technology, Naya Raipur
- National Institute of Technology, Raipur
- Bhilai Institute of Technology, Durg
- Central Institute of Plastics Engineering & Technology, Raipur
- Government Engineering College, Bilaspur
- Government Engineering College, Jagdalpur
- Government Engineering College, Raipur
- Vishwavidyalaya Engineering College, Ambikapur
- Chhatrapati Shivaji Institute of Technology, Durg
- Chhattisgarh Institute of Technology, Rajnandgaon
- Christian College of Engineering & Technology, Bhilai
- Disha Institute of Management and Technology, Raipur
- Institute of Technology, Guru Ghasidas University
- Institute of Technology, Korba
- Kirodimal Institute of Technology, Raigarh
- O.P. Jindal University, Raigarh
- Rungta College Bhilai
- RUNGTA COLLEGE OF ENGINEERING & TECHNOLOGY, Bhilai
- Raipur Institute of Technology
- Shri Shankaracharya College of Engineering and Technology, Bhilai
- Shri Shankaracharya Institute of Technology & Management, Bhilai
- Shri Shankaracharya Engineering College, Bhilai
- Shri Shankaracharya Institute of Professional Management and Technology, Raipur
- Shri Shankaracharya Institute of Engineering & Technology, Bhilai
- Shri Rawatpura Sarkar Institute of Technology, Naya Raipur, Raipur
- Shri Rawatpura Sarkar Institute of Technology-II, Naya Raipur, Bhilai
- Parthivi College of Engineering and Management, Sirsakala, Bhilai
- Anjaneya University, Raipur, Chhattisgarh

== Polytechnic ==
- Government Polytechnic, Surajpur
- Government Polytechnic, Khairagarh
- Government Girls Polytechnic, Bilaspur
- Kirodimal Govt. Polytechnic, Raigarh
- Shri Rawatpura Sarkar Polytechnic College, Dhaneli Raipur

== Handloom ==
- Indian Institute of Handloom Technology, Champa

== Journalism and Mass communication ==
- Kushabhau Thakre Patrakarita Avam Jansanchar Vishwavidyalaya
- Anjaneya University, Raipur, Chhattisgarh

== Dental colleges ==
- New Horizon Dental College and Research Institute

== Pharmacy ==
- Guru Ghasidas Central University, Bilaspur
- Institute of Pharmacy PRSU, Raipur
- Shri Rawatpura Sarkar College of Pharmacy, Dhaneli
- Rungta College of Pharmaceutical Sciences and Research(RCPSR), Bhilai
- Rungta Institute of Pharmaceutical Education and Research (RIPER), Bhilai

== Medical Colleges ==
- All India Institute of Medical Sciences, Raipur
- CCM Medical College, Durg
- Chhattisgarh Institute of Medical Sciences, Bilaspur
- Chhattisgarh Institute of Medical Sciences and Associated Sardar Patel Hospital, Bilaspur
- Government Medical College, Raigarh
- Government Medical College, Rajnandgaon
- Late Baliram Kashyap Memorial Government Medical College, Jagdalpur
- Pt. Jawahar Lal Nehru Memorial Medical College, Raipur
- Raipur Institute of Medical Sciences
- RSDKS medical College Ambikapur

== Business Schools ==
- Shivalik Institute of Management Education and Research, Durg
- Indian Institute of Management Raipur
