= Government Engineering College Raipur =

Engineering college in Chhattisgarh, India

Government Engineering College, Raipur (GECR)
- GEC Raipur
- Other names: New Government Engineering College Raipur (NGECR)
- Type: Public
- Established: 2006
- Affiliations: Chhattisgarh Swami Vivekanand Technical University
- Principal: Dr. M.R. Khan
- Academic staff: 93
- Undergraduates: 1226
- Location: Raipur, Chhattisgarh, India; 21.25°N 81.63°E
- Campus: Urban
- Website: gecraipur.ac.in

Government Engineering College, Raipur (GEC Raipur) is a public engineering college located in Sejbahar, Raipur, Chhattisgarh, India. Established in 2006, it is affiliated with Chhattisgarh Swami Vivekanand Technical University, Bhilai, and recognized by AICTE, New Delhi.

The college offers undergraduate degree courses in various engineering disciplines, including Civil Engineering, Mechanical Engineering, Computer Science Engineering, Electrical and Electronics Engineering, and Electronics and Telecommunications Engineering. The campus is equipped with modern facilities such as laboratories, workshops, smart classrooms, an e-library, Wi-Fi, and an auditorium.

Various student clubs and societies are active on campus, including AVESH Club, SAE Club, CODE Club, E-CELL Club, and LOK Club under the START-UP CELL initiative. These clubs foster extracurricular activities, innovation, and entrepreneurship among students

== History ==
GEC Raipur was established in 2006 by Government of Chhattisgarh and started offering Bachelor of technology in Computer Science & Engineering, Electrical and ElectronicEngineering, Electronics and Telecommunication Engineering, Mechanical Engineering with intake capacity of 60 each. Again Civil Engineering was introduced in 2007 with an intake capacity of 40.

== Departments ==
- Department of Electronics & Telecommunication
- Department of Computer Science
- Department of Electrical & Electronics
- Department of Mechanical
- Department of Civil Engineering
- Department of Humanities & Applied Sciences

== Course offered ==
Currently the institute offers Bachelor of technology (B Tech) in the following areas:

Specialization	Intake
Civil Engineering	40
Computer Science Engineering	60
Electrical & Electronics Engineering	60
Mechanical Engineering	60
Electronic and telecommunication Engineering	60

== Admissions ==
Admissions are made on the basis of students performance in Jee exam and Chhattisgarh Pre Engineering Test (CGPET) conducted by Directorate of Technical Education, Government of Chhattisgarh.

== See also ==
- Indian Institute of Technology Bhilai
- Indian Institute of Management Raipur
- Government Engineering College, Bilaspur
- Kirodimal Institute of Technology, Raigarh
- Institute of Technology, Guru Ghasidas University
- National Institute of Technology, Raipur
- International Institute of Information Technology, Naya Raipur
