= Shri Shankaracharya Institute of Professional Management and Technology =

Engineering college in Chhattisgarh, India

Shri Shankaracharya Institute of Professional Management and Technology Raipur
- Motto: "To Serve the Nation"
- Type: Education and research institution
- Established: 2008
- Affiliations: Chhattisgarh Swami Vivekanand Technical University
- Chairman: Shri Nishant Tripathi
- President: Shri I.P. Mishra
- Principal: Shri Alok Jain
- Director: Shri M. L. Dewangan
- Location: Raipur, Chhattisgarh, India
- Acronym: SSIPMT
- Website: www.ssipmt.com

The Shri Shankaracharya Institute of Professional Management and Technology (SSIPMT) Raipur is a unit of Shri Shankaracharya Technical Campus (SSTC), managed by Shri Gangajali Education Society (SGES), approved by All India Council for Technical Education (AICTE) and affiliated to Chhattisgarh Swami Vivekanand Technical University, Bhilai, and is named after Adi Shankaracharya. The college offers education in Bachelor of Engineering, Master of Engineering and MBA.

== History ==
The College, established in 2008, is the first Shankaracharya Group College in Raipur managed by Shri Gangajali Education Society.

== Administration ==
The Governing body comprises representatives of the Society, Nominees of Chhattisgarh Swami Vivekanand Technical University, Bhilai, Nominees of AICTE; State Govt. The Director of the college is the ex-officio members secretary of the Governing Body.

== Courses ==
SSIPMT offers the following four-year undergraduate degree courses in the following branches

- Computer Science and Engineering
- Electronics and Telecommunication
- Information Technology.
- Mechanical Engineering.
- Civil Engineering.
- COMPUTER SCIENCE AND ENGINEERING(ARTIFICIAL INTELLIGENCE)
- ARTIFICIAL INTELLIGENCE AND MACHINE LEARNING

The course is divided into eight semesters. The ordinances of CSVTU, are followed in respect of attendance, examination, rules for passing, award of degrees etc.

SSIPMT also offers following two-year postgraduate degree courses, in following specializations

- Human Resources Management (Master of Business Administration)
- Marketing Management (Master of Business Administration)
- Systems Management (Master of Business Administration)
- Finance Management (Master of Business Administration)
- Production Management (Master of Business Administration)

== Departments ==
SSIPMT has the following departments:

- Information Technology
- Computer Science & Engineering
- Electronics & Telecommunication
- Department of Mechanical Engineering
- Master of Business Administration (MBA)
- Applied Physics
- Applied Chemistry
- Applied Mathematics
- Communication Skills
- Civil Engineering

== Events & Conferences ==
- ICI-SDSMT-2017 - "International Conference on Innovations & Sustainable Development in Sciences, Management & Technology" had been held at SSIPMT, during 25–26 March 2017.
- "SPSS Data Analysis Workshop" - "Introduction to SPSS for Data Analysis Workshop" was being held at SSIPMT on 25 March 2017.

== Hostel ==
SSIPMT offers separate hostels for boys and girls inside the College premises itself.

== See also ==
- Shri Shankaracharya College of Engineering and Technology
- Shri Shankaracharya Engineering College
- Shri Shankaracharya Institute of Technology & Management
- Shri Gangajali Education Society
- Chhattisgarh Swami Vivekanand Technical University
