= SRU =

SRU may refer to:

== Organizations ==
- Salve Regina University, Newport, Rhode Island, US
- Scottish Rugby Union
- Shri Rawatpura Sarkar University, Chhattisgarh, India
- Slippery Rock University of Pennsylvania, US
- Sri Ramachandra University, Chennai, India
- Sulaiman Al Rajhi University, Saudi Arabia

== Other ==
- Search/Retrieve via URL, Internet protocol
- Shop-replaceable unit of a vessel or aircraft
- South Ruislip station, London, England (National Rail station code)
- Solvent Recovery Unit, (also known as SRS, or SRP) a VOC emission control method typically using activated carbon
- Strategic Response Unit in Flashpoint (TV series)
