= Maitri Bagh =

Coordinates: 21°10′17″N 81°21′11″E

Matri Baag Zoo
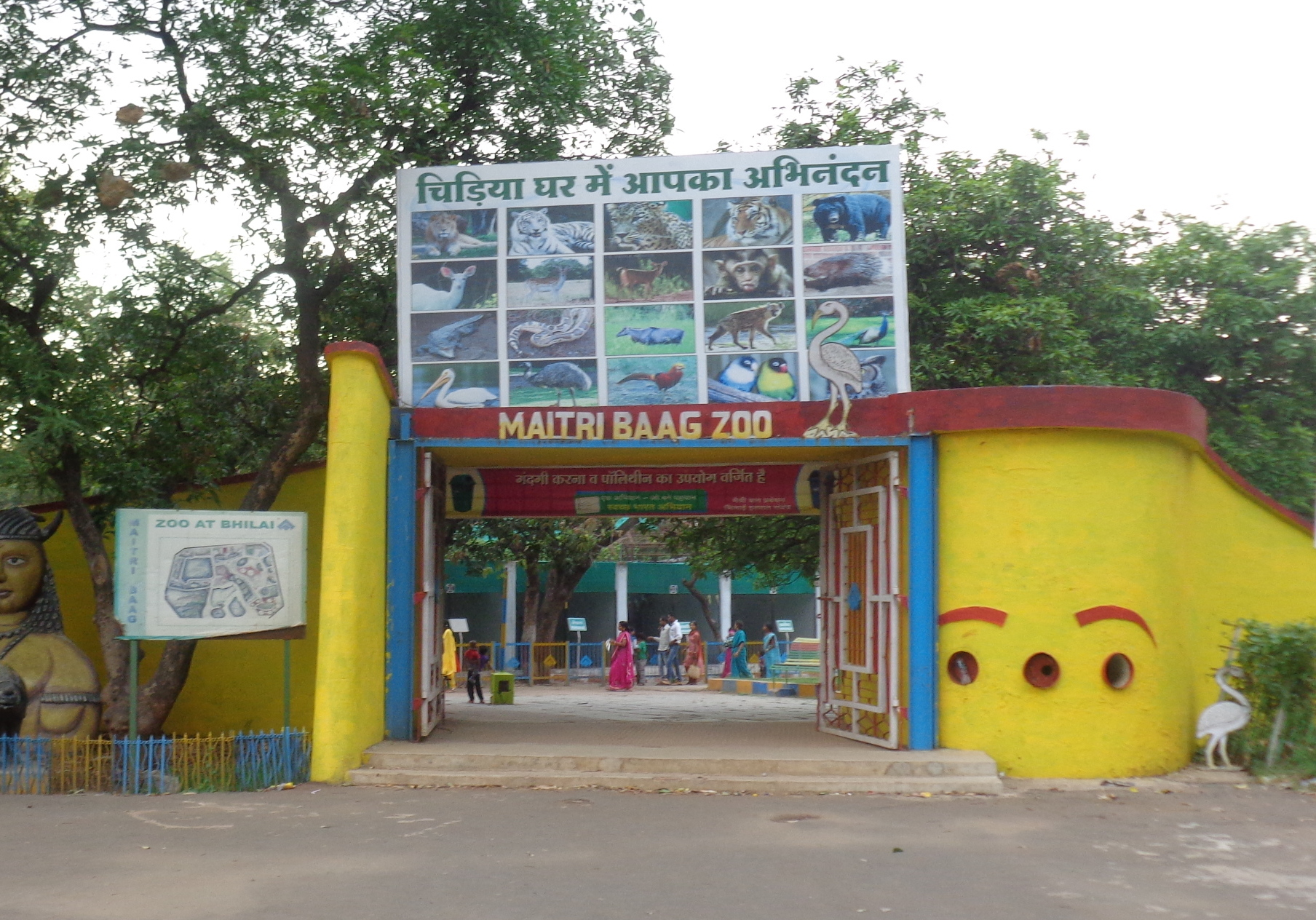
- Interactive map of Matri Baag Zoo
- Date opened: 1972; 54 years ago
- Location: Maroda Sector, Bhilai, Chhattisgarh 490006
- Land area: 111 acres (44.94 ha)
- Annual visitors: 911767

Maitri Bagh Zoo (also known as Garden of Friendship) is a tourist location in Bhilai, India which was established as a symbol of friendship between the Soviet Union and India. It is the largest and oldest zoo of Chhattisgarh and previously of the undivided Madhya Pradesh.

== History ==
Maitri Bagh is a "Friendship Garden" established as a symbol of India-Soviet Union friendship. It was established in 1972 and was developed and maintained by Bhilai Steel Plant.

== Photo Gallery ==
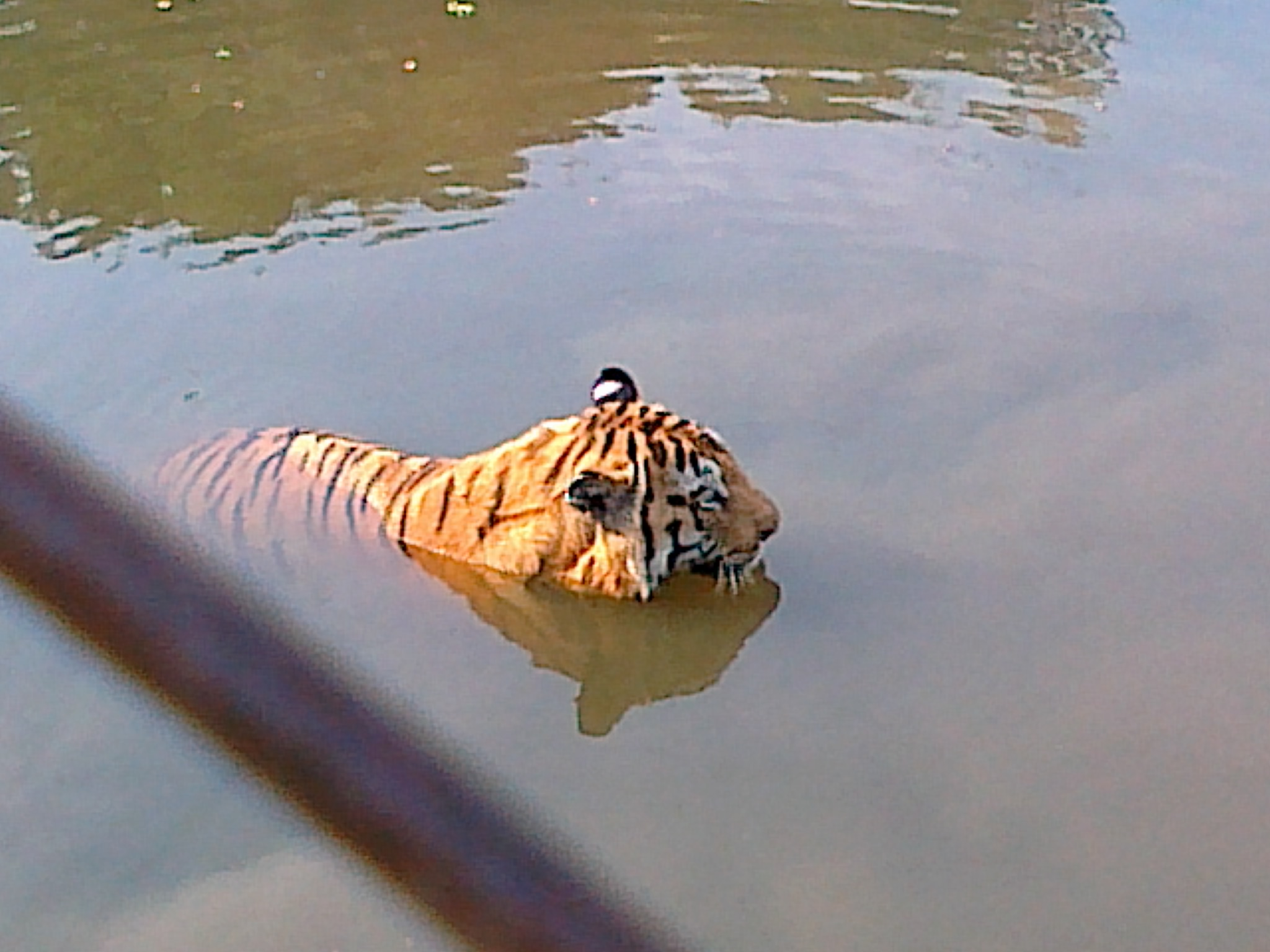
Bengal tiger in Maitri Bagh lake

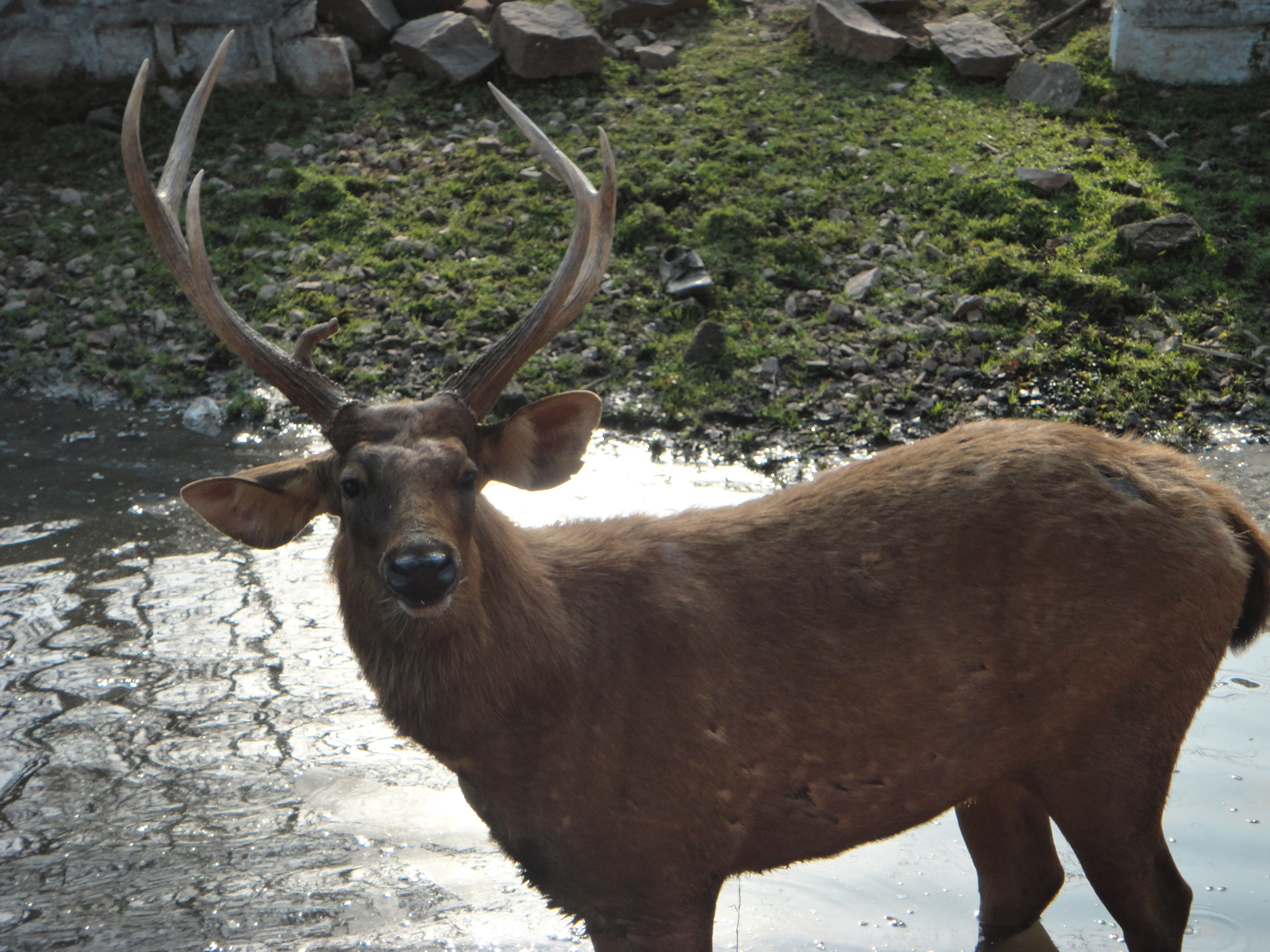
Sambar deer stag in the park

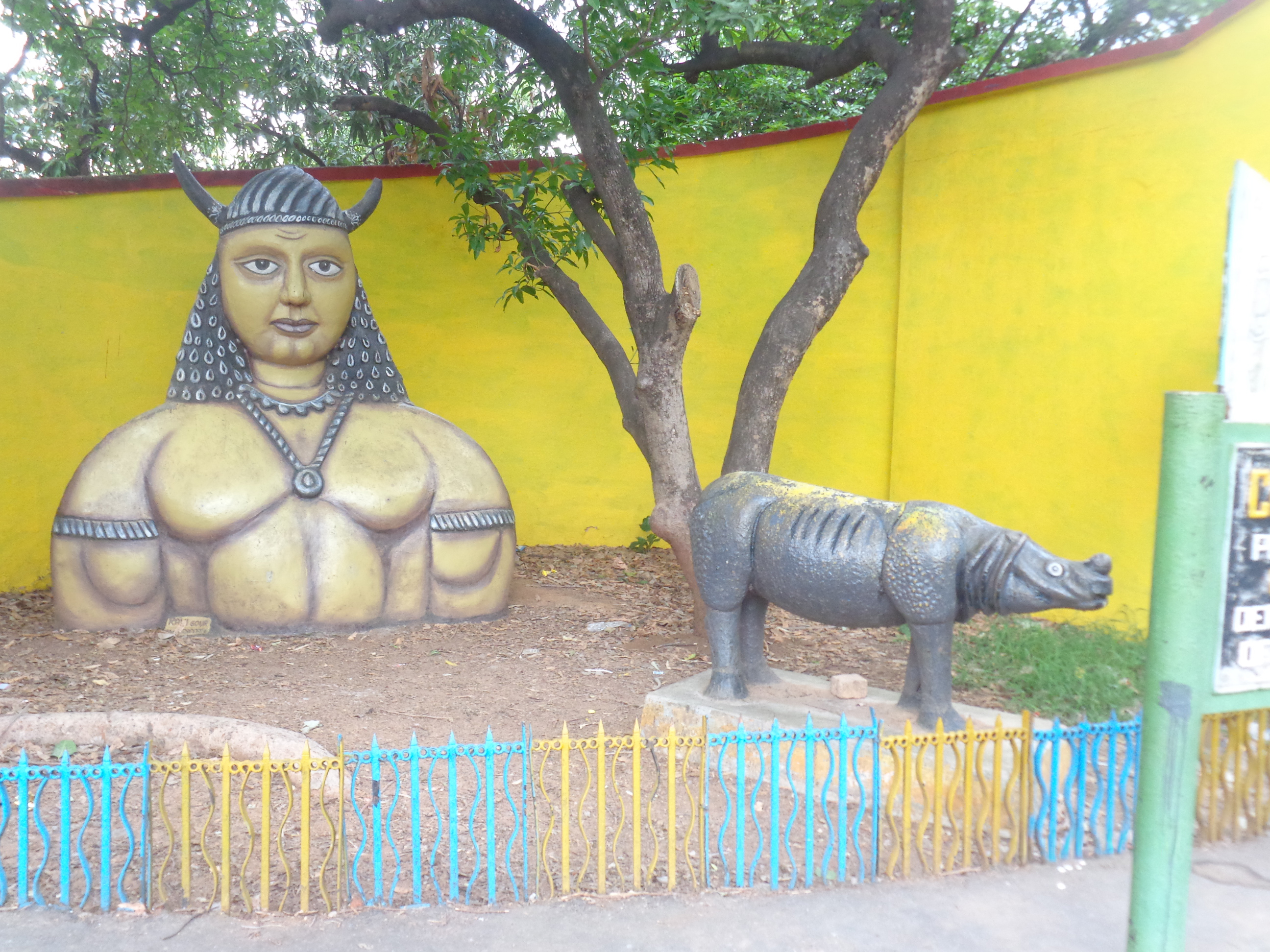
Maitri Bagh entrance statues

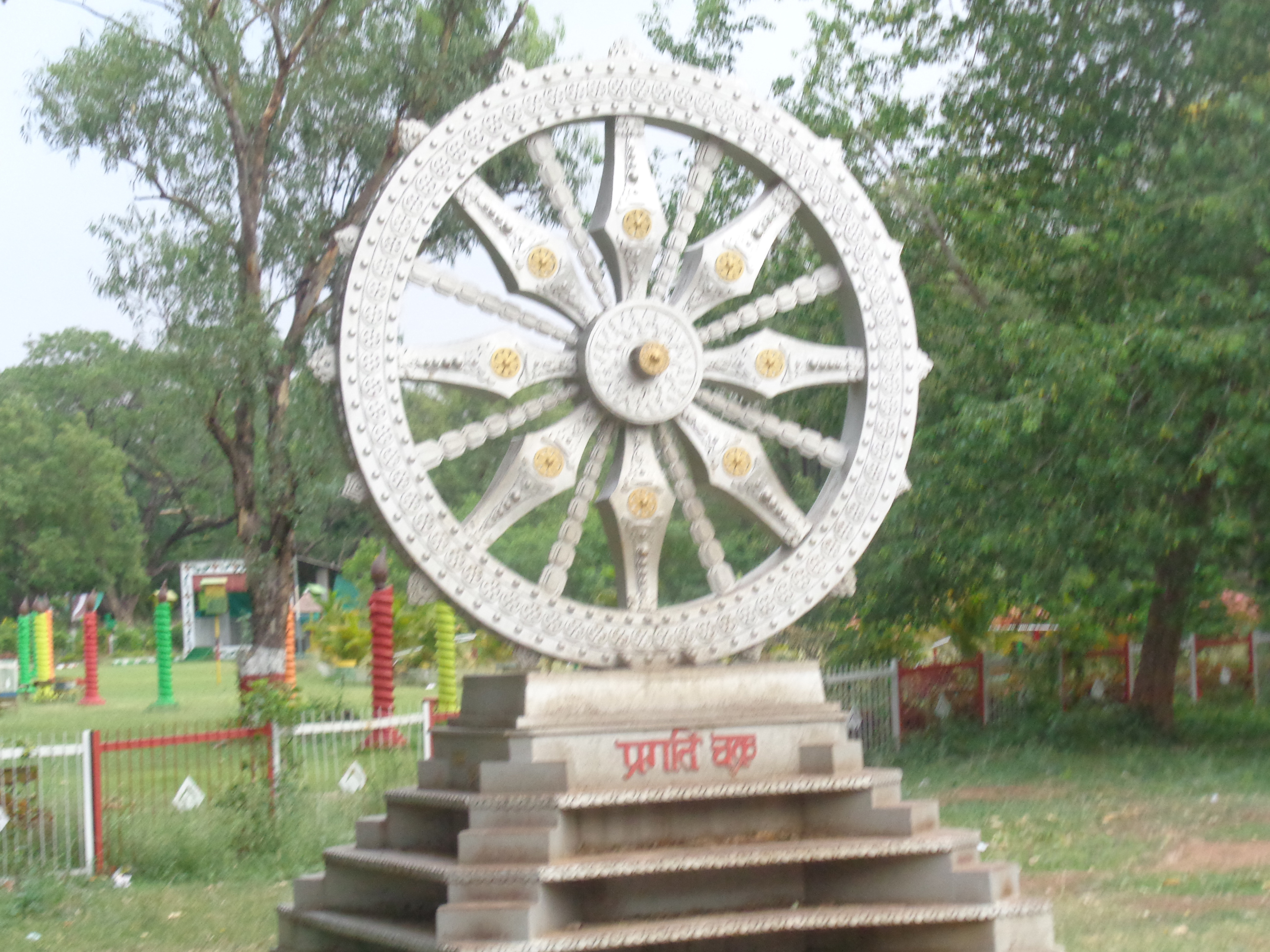
Ashoka Chakra in Maitri Bagh

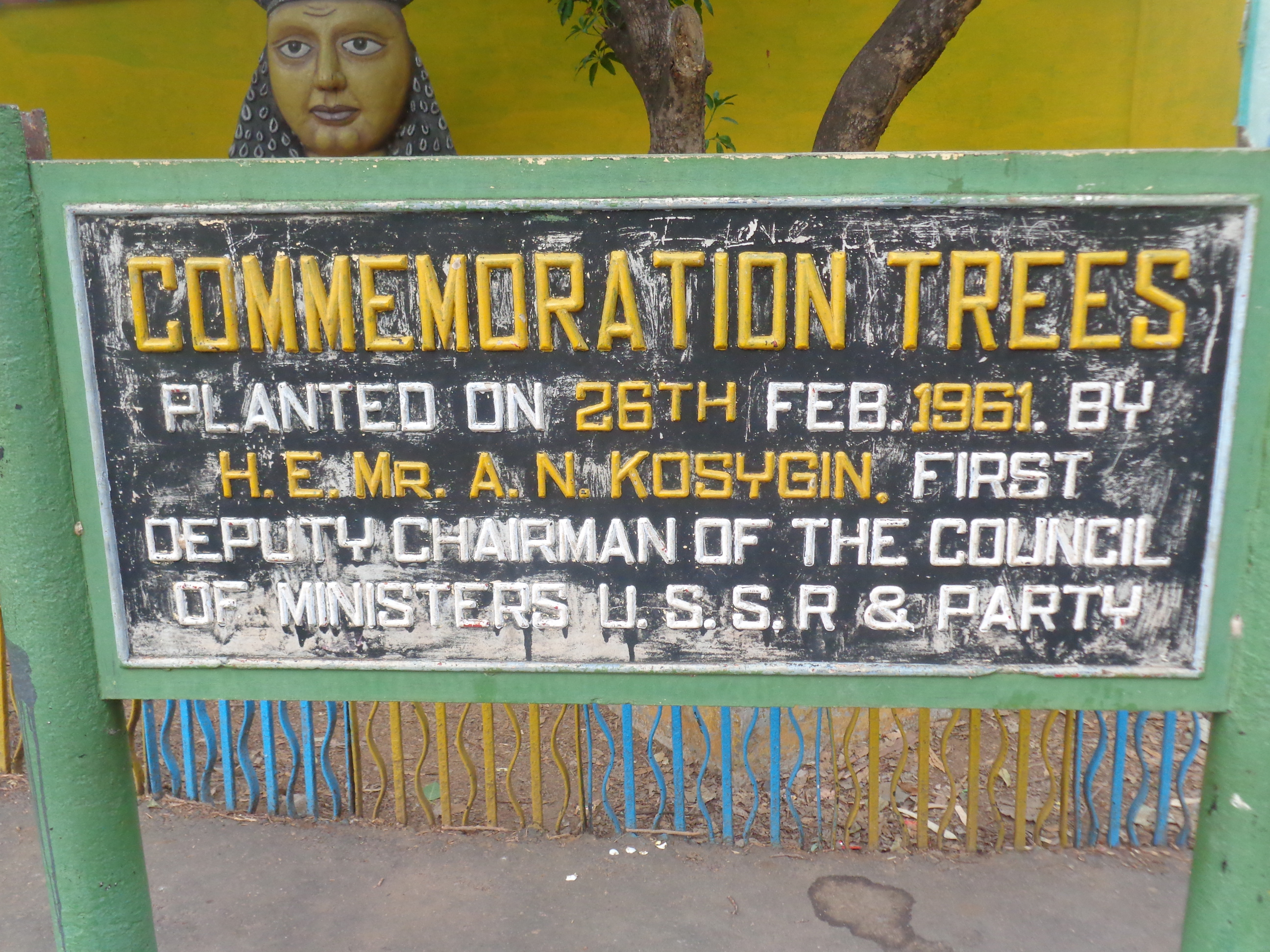
Alexei Kosygin, the First Deputy Premier of the Soviet Union's commemoration marker where he planted trees while visiting Bhilai in 1961

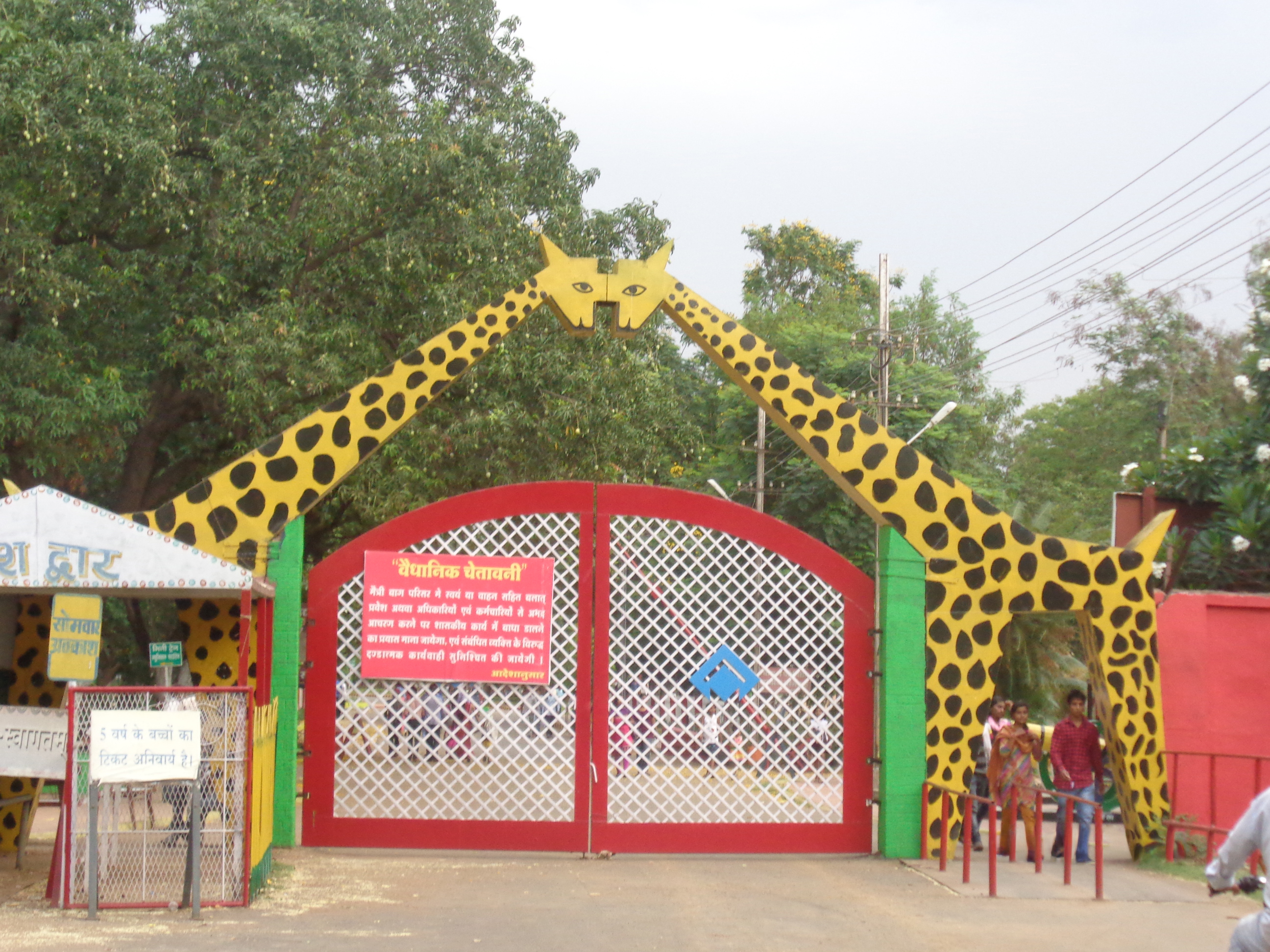
Maitri Bagh entrance gate
