= Chitrasena (disambiguation) =

Chitrasena is a pioneering Sri Lankan dancer.

Chitrasena may also refer to:

- Chitrasena (Mahabharata), a Gandharva king in the Hindu epic Mahabharata
- Mahendravarman (Chenla) (died 611), Cambodian king also known as Citrasena
- Chitra Sen, an Indian actress
- Chitrasen Chandam Singh, an Indian footballer
- Chitrasen Sahu, an Indian mountaineer
- Chitrasen Sinku, an Indian politician
