= Bhilai Airport =

Airport in Bhilai, Chhattisgarh India

- IATA: none; ICAO: VA1E

Summary
- Airport type: Public
- Owner: Steel Authority of India
- Operator: Steel Authority of India
- Serves: Bhilai
- Location: Nandini, Chhattisgarh, India
- Elevation AMSL: 1,020 ft / 311 m
- Coordinates: 21°17′39″N 81°22′46″E

Map
- Location of the airport in Chhattisgarh Bhilai Airport (India)

Runways
Direction	Length		Surface
Direction	ft	m	Surface
05/23	4,625	1,410	asphalt

Bhilai Airport or Nandini Airstrip is located at Bhilai, in the state of Chhattisgarh, India. The airport is owned by the Steel Authority of India.
