= Government Engineering College, Bilaspur =

Engineering college in Chhattisgarh

- Type: Public
- Established: 1964
- Affiliations: Chhattisgarh Swami Vivekanand Technical University
- Location: Bilaspur, Chhattisgarh, India; 22.0765°N 82.1646°E
- Campus: Urban, 179 acres (72 ha)
- Website: gecbsp.ac.in

Government Engineering College, Bilaspur (GEC Bilaspur) is a public engineering college located in Bilaspur, Chhattisgarh, India. Established in 1964, it is affiliated to Chhattisgarh Swami Vivekanand Technical University, Bhilai. It is one of three Government Engineering College in Chhattisgarh along with Government Engineering College, Raipur, Government Engineering College, Jagdalpur.

Fees structure

18000 per semester

== History ==
It was established 1964, it was earlier affiliated to Pandit Ravishankar Shukla University, Raipur. The first academic session started in July 1964 and the first batch passed out in the year 1969. In 2005, College became affiliated to newly formed Chhattisgarh Swami Vivekanand Technical University, Bhilai.

== Location ==
This college is located on korba - bilaspur road occupying an area of 179 acres of land.

== Departments ==
- Mining Engineering
- Information Technology
- Civil Engineering
- Mechanical Engineering
- Electrical Engineering
- Computer Science Engineering
- Electronics & Telecommunication Engineering

== Notable alumni ==
- Chitrasen Sahu, mountaineer
- Amit Mishra, Physics faculty
