= Bhilai Institute of Technology =

Private engineering college in Durg, India

Bhilai Institute of Technology Durg
- Motto: Aspire to Excel
- Type: Private Engineering School
- Established: 1986
- Principal: Dr Anup Mishra
- Director: Arun Arora
- Location: Bhilai House, Durg, Chhattisgarh, 491001, India; 21°11′35″N 81°17′58″E
- Campus: Urban
- Language: English
- Colors: Green, Yellow, Blue and Red
- Website: www.bitdurg.ac.in

Bhilai Institute of Technology Durg (BIT DURG) is a private engineering college in Chhattisgarh, India.

== History ==
The commissioning of the Bhilai Steel Plant at Bhilai in 1959 necessitated having suitably trained and skilled personnel to perform specific technical tasks at the plant. Seeing this need, various organizations, industrialists, charitable institutions, and philanthropic societies decided to establish an engineering institution, and to this end, a trust was formed and registered. The Government of Madhya Pradesh accorded to open a self-supporting and self-financing engineering institute, and thus, in July 1986, the Bhilai Institute of Technology came into existence.

Seth Balkrishan was a philanthropist and a key founding member of BIT. His contributions in the fields of education, sports, social advancement, and the spiritual needs of the community are seen as legendary in Bhilai and the neighboring regions. The institute is therefore dedicated to him.

BIT-Durg was established in 1986, it was affiliated with Pandit Ravishankar Shukla University, Raipur and started offering Bachelor of Engineering in Civil Engineering, Electrical Engineering, Electronics and Telecommunication, and Mechanical Engineering with an intake capacity of 180 students. Over the years, it started offering Computer Science and Engineering and a Master of Business Administration (1998), a Master of Computer Applications (1999), Information Technology (2000), and Electrical and Electronics (2006). In 2005, the institute became affiliated with the newly formed Chhattisgarh Swami Vivekanand Technical University, Bhilai. On 16 July 2020, it became the first engineering college in Chhattisgarh to be awarded autonomous status.

== Location ==
Durg District, Chhattisgarh-India

The institute is located at the threshold of Durg city beside NH-53 (GE Road), in Chhattisgarh, India. The whole establishment is spread over 62 ha (150 acres) of land, in Bhilai House, opposite the Circuit House. Its proximity to Durg bus depot and Durg railway station facilitates fast commuting. Additionally, it is connected to each and every corner of Bhilai-Durg agglomeration through various means of transportation such as minibuses, auto rickshaw etc.

== Academics ==
The Programmes offered by the institute can be broadly classified as follows:

- Undergraduate programmes
- Postgraduate programmes
- Doctorate programmes

All the Undergraduate programs are full-time courses, whereas postgraduate programs involve both full-time and part-time courses. It offers Bachelor of Technology (B.Tech) in Civil Engineering, Computer Science Engineering, Electrical and Electronics Engineering, Information Technology , Mechanical Engineering etc.

Apart from this, for the purpose of promoting higher studies and research, the institute has research centres in the fields of Civil Engineering, Electrical and Electronics Engineering, Mechanical Engineering, Engineering Mathematics, Environmental Engineering, and Engineering Chemistry.

The Institute admits undergraduate students through CGPET and JEE-Main.

The Institute admits MCA students through AIMCET, MBA students through MAT, and M.E./M.Tech students through GATE.

== Campus ==
The institute has 5 blocks:

- Administrative block, holding offices of various administrative departments and the central library
- ECOMIT block, holds three departments Electronics, Computer and Information Technology, as well as the central computer lab
- Mechanical Engineering Block
- Electrical Engineering|Electrical/Civil Engineering Block
- Engineering Sciences and Management Block, including facilities for research in basic sciences

There is also an auditorium and an open-air theater which host various cultural programmes and national and local seminars.

=== Open-Air Theater ===
The Open Air Theater of BIT is used for hosting several activities like skits, dramas, renditions, festivals, competitions, seminars, Annual function etc. It has a total build up area of 3,300 sq ft (310 m^{2}), seating capacity of 3000 people, 30 ft (9.1 m) × 40 ft (12 m) stage size, 300 sq ft (28 m^{2}) each of Gent's and Girl's green room, 400 sq ft (37 m^{2}) of Store room and 26,000 sq ft (2,400 m^{2}) of open area.

=== Auditorium ===
The Auditorium of BIT was inaugurated in 2006. From then on it is responsible for hosting seminars, music shows and other activities. BITCON, the national conference is hosted in the Auditorium. The Auditorium has a build-up area of 10,000 sq ft (930 m^{2}), seating capacity of 500 persons, Stage size of 40 ft (12 m) × 30 ft (9.1 m), Airconditioned hall, Air cooled entrance foyer area of 2,000 sq ft (190 m^{2}), Boy's and girl's green rooms each of area 200 sq ft (19 m^{2}), Rest room, projector room, front area parking and electrical panel room.

=== Sports Complex ===
The institute has an outdoor field area of 2,000 m^{2} (22,000 sq ft) comprising cricket, hockey and football fields and courts for volleyball, handball & basketball. The sports complex also has an athletics track of 400 metres. Supporting it are the Indoor Stadium and Gymnasium of 350 m^{2} (3,800 sq ft) for indoor events like table tennis, badminton, chess and carrom.

== Cultural activities ==
The colleges hosts an annual national level techno-cultural fest called Ojas. It also takes place in the state level cultural, technical and sports competition conducted by the University. the local SPICMACAY chapter also organizes various annual programmes. Other activities ae organized by the Vista club and the astro and clicks club. It also has National level clubs like the National Service Scheme having the aim of "development of the personality of students through community service". It was established in the year 1986 under Pt. RSU, Raipur then transferred to CSVTU, Bhilai in 2006.
