= Shri Shankaracharya Institute of Technology & Management =

Engineering college in Chhattisgarh, India

Shri Shankaracharya Institute of Technology and Management Bhilai
- Motto: "To Serve the Nation"
- Type: Education and research institution
- Established: 2008
- Affiliations: Chhattisgarh Swami Vivekanand Technical University(CSVTU)
- President: Mr. I.P. Mishra
- Principal: Dr. Neeta Tripathi
- Director: Dr. P.B. Deshmukh
- Location: Bhilai, Durg, Chhattisgarh, India
- Acronym: SSITM
- Website: Official website

The Shri Shankaracharya Institute of Technology and Management (SSITM) Bhilai is a unit of Shri Shankaracharya Technical Campus (SSTC), managed by the Shri Gangajali Education Society (SGES), approved by All India Council for Technical Education (AICTE) and affiliated to Chhattisgarh Swami Vivekanand Technical University Bhilai (CSVTU), and is named after Adi Shankaracharya. The college offers education in Bachelor of Engineering, Master of Engineering and MBA.

== History ==
The college, established in 2008, is the third engineering college added to the chain of college/schools managed by SGES, following Shri Shankaracharya College of Engineering and Technology & Shri Shankaracharya Engineering College.

== Overview ==
SSITM Bhilai is an ISO 9001:2008 certified institution. WIPRO Mission 10X Learning Centre (MTLC) has been set up to train students on latest technologies. The College provides more than 400 computer systems.

== Administration ==
The Governing body comprises representatives of the Society, Nominees of Technical University ( CSVTU ), Bhilai, Nomineers of AICTE; State Govt. The Director of the college is the ex-officio members secretary of the Governing Body. All examinations are conducted by CSVTU at the same time for all affiliated engineering colleges and the degree also bears the sole name of CSVTU.

== Courses ==
The Institute offers the following four-year undergraduate degree courses in the following branches

- Computer Science and Engineering
- Electronics and Telecommunication
- Electrical and Electronics
- Information Technology.
- Mechanical Engineering.
- Civil Engineering.

The Institute also offers following two-year postgraduate degree courses, in following specializations

- Digital Electronics (Master of Engineering)
- Production Engineering (Master of Engineering)
- Power System & Engineering (Master of Engineering)
- Human Resources Management (Master of Business Administration)
- Marketing Management (Master of Business Administration)
- Systems Management (Master of Business Administration)
- Finance Management (Master of Business Administration)
- Production Management (Master of Business Administration)

The Institute also offers following three-year diploma courses, in following specializations

- Civil Engineering
- Mechanical Engineering

== Departments ==
SSITM has the following departments:

- Department of Information Technology
- Department of Computer Science & Engineering
- Department of Electronics & Telecommunication Engineering
- Department of Electrical & Electronics Engineering
- Department of Mechanical Engineering
- Department of Civil Engineering
- Department of Business Administration
- Department of Applied Physics
- Department of Applied Chemistry
- Department of Applied Mathematics
- Department of Humanities

== Hostel ==
SGES offers separate boys and girls hostels in different campus. There are four girls hostels, three in a row at ten minutes walking distance from college and one is a little farther for which college provides free bus facility. There are two boys hostel(within the college campus), one for only first year students and second for the rest.

== See also ==
- Shri Shankaracharya College of Engineering and Technology
- Shri Shankaracharya Engineering College
- Shri Gangajali Education Society
- Chhattisgarh Swami Vivekanand Technical University
