= Alok Kumar Chakrawal =

Indian academic

Vice-chancellor of Guru Ghasidas Vishwavidyalaya
- Incumbent
- Assumed office 23 July 2021
- Preceded by: Anjila Gupta

Personal details
- Born: September 20, 1969 (age 57) Varanasi, Uttar Pradesh

Alok Kumar Chakrawal is an Indian academic and author who is the vice chancellor of Guru Ghasidas Vishwavidyalaya (A Central University) Bilaspur, Chhattisgarh, India.

== Early life and career ==
He became the vice chancellor of Guru Ghasidas Vishwavidyalaya in 2021. Before joining as the VC he was working as a professor, Department of Commerce & Business Administration, also worked as the Coordinator, Internal Quality Assurance Cell (IQAC) Saurashtra University.

He is a member of The Executive Council of the Centre For Narendra Modi Study: CNMS (NaMo Kendra), nominated to represent Indian Universities in the Court and Council of the Indian Institute of Science (IISc), Bangalore from the Western Region, and a member of the governing council of the Association of Indian Universities.

He also serves as the Secretary the All India Management Association (AIMA), HMA and Sr. DGM, Hardwar Management Association.

According to Rising Kashmir, he led various research projects, won awards for best papers at international conferences, and guided many Ph.D. and M.Phil. scholars.
