= Guru Ghasidas Vishwavidyalaya =

Central university in Bilaspur, Chhattisgarh, India

- गुरु घासीदास विश्वविद्यालय
- University Logo
- Motto: gyan panth kripan kae dhara (Sanskrit)
- Type: Public
- Established: 16 June 1983; 43 years ago
- Accreditation: NAAC (A++)
- Academic affiliations: UGC; ACU; AIU; AICTE; BCI
- Chancellor: Vacant
- Vice-Chancellor: Alok Kumar Chakrawal
- Visitor: President of India
- Faculty: 365
- Students: 8,256
- Undergraduates: 5,839
- Postgraduates: 2,100
- Doctoral students: 317
- Location: Bilaspur, Chhattisgarh, India; 22°07′45″N 82°08′10″E
- Campus: Urban 655 acres (265 ha)
- Website: www.ggu.ac.in

Guru Ghasidas Vishwavidyalaya is a central university in Bilaspur, Chhattisgarh, India. It is one of Chhattisgarh's largest and oldest institutions of higher education. Established under Central Universities Act 2009, No. 25 of 2009.

Formerly known as Guru Ghasidas University (GGU), established by an Act of the State Legislative Assembly, it was formally inaugurated on 16 June 1983. GGV is an active member of the Association of Indian Universities and Association of Commonwealth Universities. The National Assessment & Accreditation Council (NAAC) has accredited the university as 'A++'. The university is named after the Satnami Guru Ghasidas.

== Campus ==
Guru Ghasidas University campus spread over an area of 700 acres (2.8 km^{2}), five kilometres from the main Bilaspur town. The Arpa river runs parallel to the university campus.

=== Library ===
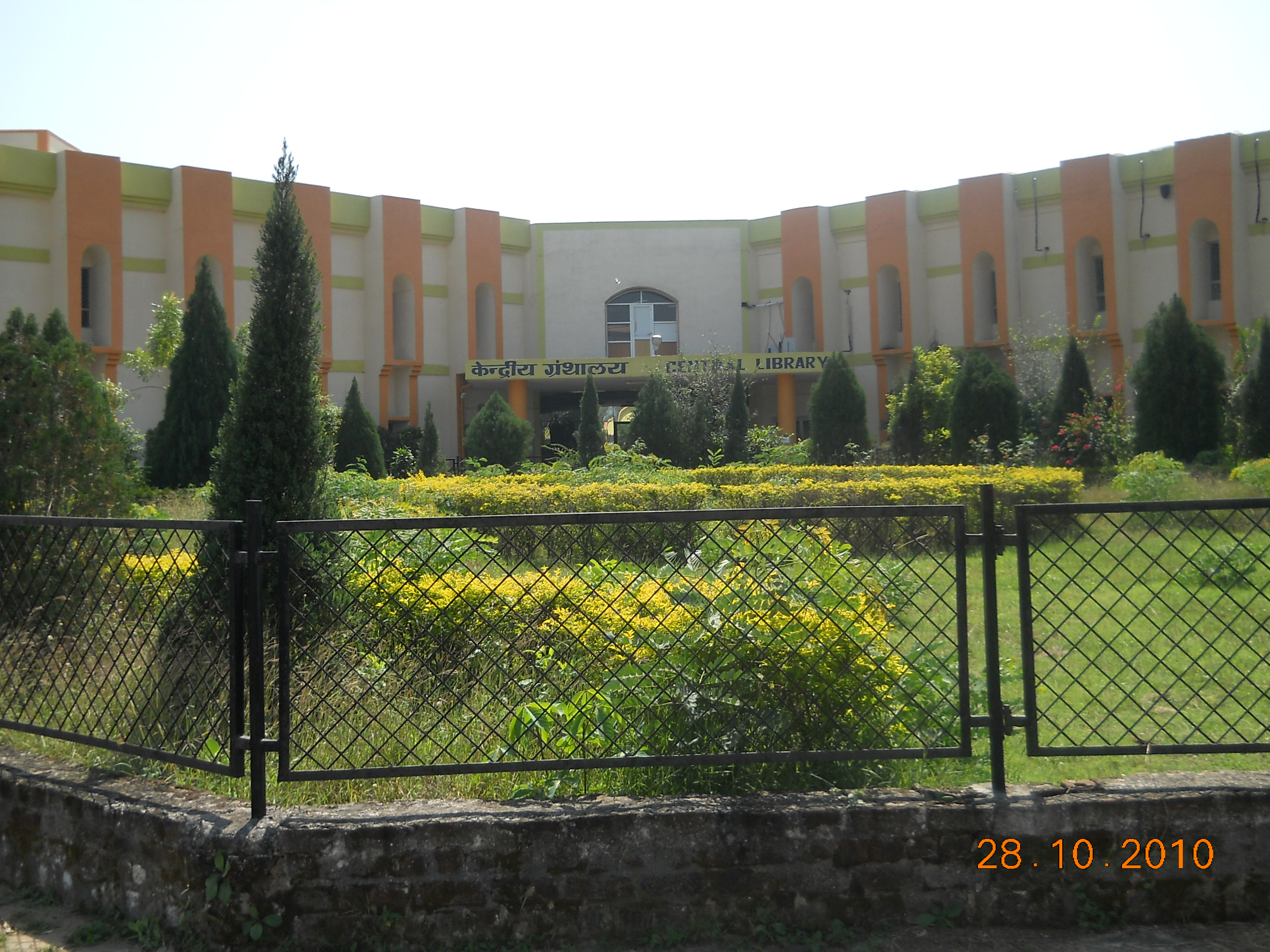
Central Library of GGV

The Central Library of Guru Ghasidas Vishwavidyalaya comprises more than 105,000 books, 3,950 back volumes of journals and 1,100 Ph.D. theses. The library also provides access to online databases, e-journals and e-books. This library has a well Wi-Fi system along with a sufficient number computers for free access. Along with Central library, departments of GGV have their separate Departmental libraries. The library has been recently named as Nalanda Central Library.

=== Auditorium ===
The University Auditorium near the administrative block can accommodate about 800 people.

=== Residential student halls ===
GGV is a residential institution. There are six hostels at GGV, three for boys, namely Dr. B.R. Ambedkar Hostel, Swami Vivekananda Hostel and Shaheed Veer Narayan Hostel and three for girls namely Raj Mohini Devi Girls Hostel, Minimata Girls Hostel, Bilasa Devi Girls Hostel. Every hostel has a common room, a TV room, a reading room and an attached mess that serves vegetarian food. There is Internet Facility in Hostels, availed by MHRD. They have a good academic environment for students. Faculty members of university act as wardens for supervision of them.

- Swami Vivekanand Boys Hostel: This hostel has 436 seats and is located near the main gate of the campus. The hostel has four blocks with double occupancy rooms. The residents of this hostel are second, third and fourth year students from all the different branches of engineering.
- Shaheed Veer Narayan Singh Boys Hostel: This hostel has 200 seats and is located near the School of Studies of Engineering and Technology of the campus. The hostel has two blocks with double occupancy rooms. The residents of this hostel are first year students from all the different branches of engineering.
- Dr. B. R. Ambedkar Boys Hostel: This hostel has 200 seats and is located near the School of Studies of Engineering and Technology of the campus. The hostel has two blocks with double occupancy rooms. The residents of this hostel are students from all the other departments except engineering.
- Raj Mohini Devi Girls Hostel: This hostel has 436 seats and is located near the School of Studies of Arts of the campus. The hostel has four blocks with double occupancy rooms.

=== Health Centre ===
The University Health Centre, near the University Computer Centre, has one Medical Officer, supporting staff and visiting specialists from CIMS.

=== Sports complex ===
The university has a sports complex with facilities for various indoor and outdoor games such as Badminton, Kabaddi, Volleyball, Basketball, Football, Cricket, and Athletics etc. The university also organizes inter-college and inter-University sports competitions and encourages students to participate in national and international events.

=== Cafeteria ===
The university has a cafeteria near the Administrative Building that provides snacks, tea, coffee, cold drinks, etc. during office hours from 09 a.m. to 06 p.m. on all working days. Canteen committee appointed by the university monitors the quality, rates & standard.

=== Bank ===
There is a branch of Punjab National Bank on campus with ATM.

=== Post office ===
The post office on campus is a branch of Koni, Bilaspur, Chhattisgarh, 495009.

=== Transport ===
The university has a fleet of buses that ply between the campus and the city (Nehru Chowk) for students and employees of this university at regular intervals. The buses are also available for educational tours and excursions.

== Organisation and administration ==
The university is structured into the following academic divisions:

1. Anthropology & Tribal Development
2. Biotechnology
3. Botany
4. Chemistry
5. Commerce
6. Computer Science & Information Technology
7. Economics
8. Education
9. English and Foreign Language
10. Forensic Science
11. Forestry, Wild Life & Environment Sc.
12. Hindi
13. History
14. Institute of Technology
15. Journalism & Mass Communication
16. Law
17. Library & Information Science
18. Management
19. Pharmacy
20. Physical Education
21. Pure & Applied Mathematics
22. Pure & Applied Physics
23. Political Sc. & Public Administration
24. Rural Technology
25. Social Work
26. Zoology

=== School of Studies in Engineering and Technology ===
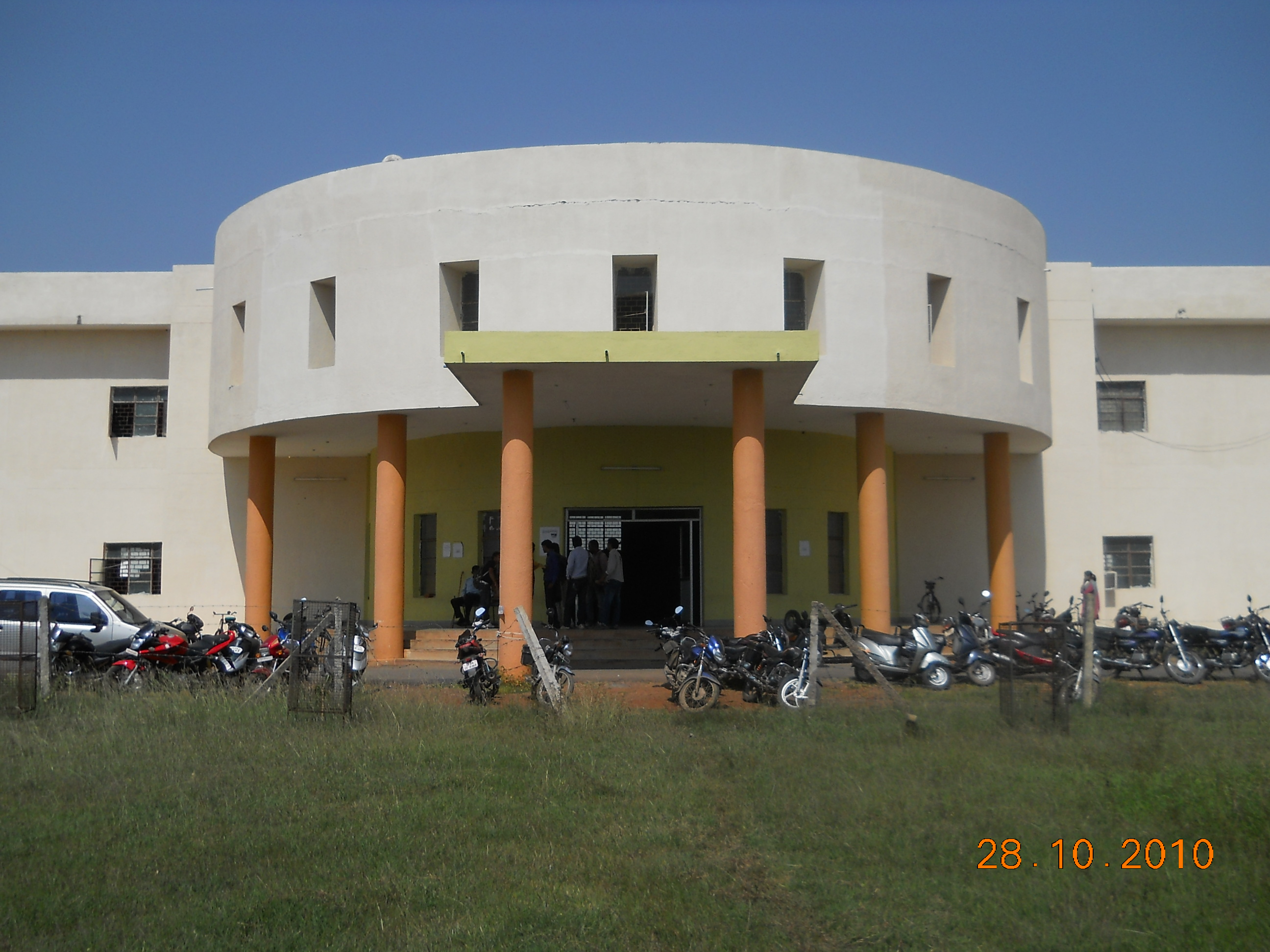
Institute of Technology

Institute of Technology, Guru Ghasidas University (IT-GGV) is a Constituent institution of Guru Ghasidas University. It was established in 1997. Currently, institute offers Bachelor of Technology, Master of Technology and Ph.D. in various engineering disciplines. Admissions to B.Tech. is done on the basis of merit obtained by the candidate in JEE-main.

=== National Centre for Accelerator Based Research ===
GGV is going to establish a 3.0 MV pelletron accelerator(9SDH-4, NEC). This is accordance with the Memorandum of Understanding (MoU) signed between Board of Research in Nuclear Science, Department of Atomic Energy, Government of India and the university, which is for setting a Special Scientific Centre in the campus with the name "National Centre for Accelerator-based Research"(in short NCAR). This inter-disciplinary research facility is related to atomic energy, it would help to create skilled manpower required for nuclear plants. NCAR will be the first of its kind in entire Central India. The machine have already reached from National Electrostatics Corporation, United States. The process of developing necessary infrastructure is going on. NCAR organized two days national workshop on particle accelerator under the aegis of Indian Society of Particle Accelerator(ISPA) on 18–19 February 2014.

== Academic profile ==
=== Ranking ===
University and college rankings

Pharmacy – India
- NIRF (2022): 43

Guru Ghasidas University was ranked 43 in the pharmacy ranking in India by National Institutional Ranking Framework (NIRF) in 2022.

== Notable alumni ==
- Arun Sao (Deputy Chief Minister of Chhattisgarh)
- Prashant Kumar Mishra (Judge of the Supreme Court of India)
- Rahul Singh Lodhi (Candidate for Lok Sabha)
- Sandeep Pathak (Member of Rajya Sabha)

== See also ==
- Institute of Technology, Guru Ghasidas University
