= Rajmohini Devi =

20th-century Indian social worker

- Born: Grogori, Sarguja, North Gondwana, Chhattisgarh, India
- Died: Sarguja, North Gondwana, Chhattisgarh, India
- Occupation: Social service
- Known for: Bapu Dharma Sabha Adivasi Seva Mandal
- Awards: Padma Shri

Rajmohini Devi was an Indian social worker, gandhian and the founder of Bapu Dharma Sabha Adivasi Seva Mandal, established by her in 1951. The famine of Surguja in 1951 involved a great scarcity of food grains and crop failure. The famine had direct bearing on the rise of a reform movement called Rajmohini Devi Movement, a non governmental organization working for the welfare of the tribal people of Gondwana, in the Indian state of Chhattisgarh. It was reported that she had a vision about Mahatma Gandhi and his ideals during the famine of 1951, and she started a movement, (popularly known as Rajmohini Movement) for the liberation of women. and eradication of superstitions and drinking habits among the tribal people. The movement gradually assumed the status of a cult movement with a following of over 80,000 people and was later converted into a non governmental organization, under the name, Bapu Dharma Sabha Adivasi Seva Mandal. The organization functions through several ashrams set up in the states of Chhattisgarh, Bihar and Uttar Pradesh.

The Government of India awarded Devi the fourth highest civilian award of Padma Shri in 1989. Her life has been documented in a book, Samajik Kranti ki Agradoot Rajmohini Devi, written by Seema Sudhir Jindal and published by Chhattisgarh State Hindi Granth Academy in 2013. A research station, Raj Mohini Devi College of Agriculture and Research Station, housed at Indira Gandhi Agricultural University and a government girls' college, Rajmohini Devi PG Girls College, in Ambikapur, are named after her.
