= Chitrasen Sahu =

Indian mountaineer

Personal information
- Born: 12 October 1992 (age 33) Balod, Chhattisgarh, India
- Occupations: Indian mountaineer Motivational speaker Wheelchair basketball player Inclusion and disability rights activist Civil engineer
- Website: www.halfhumanrobo.com

Chitrasen Sahu (born 12 October 1992), also known as "Half Human Robo," is an Indian mountaineer and inclusion and disability rights activist. He is the first double amputee from India to scale Mount Elbrus, Mount Kilimanjaro (Tanzania) and Mount Kosciuszko (Australia). He is also a national wheelchair basketball player.

On 4 June 2014, while attempting to board a train, his hands slipped, he fell between the train and the platform and both of his legs were badly damaged. With help from RPF personnel he was admitted to a hospital in Raipur and in the space of 24 days both his legs were amputated.

== Early life and career ==
Sahu was born and brought up in Beloudi, Balod District, Chhattisgarh. He studied in a government school in his village and earned a bachelor's degree in civil engineering from Government Engineering College, Bilaspur. He was accepted into the Air Force and had begun preparing for competitive exams when the accident happened in which he lost both his legs.

== Train accident ==
Sahu boarded the Amarkantak Express, which runs from Raipur to Bilaspur, on 4 June 2014. At Bhatapatra station he left the train to buy some water. By the time he returned, the train had slowly started moving. He ran for a short distance and tried to board the moving train, but the door handle was greasy and he slipped, lost his balance and fell.

Initially, police suspected that he was either attempting suicide or had met with an accident while crossing the railway tracks, but the flagman of the train came forward and was able to explain the incident in detail. Sahu was taken to a hospital where one leg was amputated immediately; twenty-four days later, his second leg was also amputated due to medical negligence.

== Mountaineering ==
After his accident, Sahu decided to attempt the Seven Summits, aided by experienced mountaineer Rahul Gupta from Chhattisgarh. He started with Mount Kilimanjaro, reaching the summit on 23 September 2019 after six days in temperatures of -10 to -15 degrees C. He went on to scale Mount Kosciuszko, the highest peak in Australia, on 2 March 2020.

== Activism ==
With both legs amputated, Sahu found it difficult to get a motor vehicle licence, despite having purchased and specially modified a car for his needs. He was eventually awarded a judgement in his favour by the high court of Bilaspur, which opened the door for many other people with disabilities to obtain a license.

He started an initiative called "Mission Inclusion," which aims to increase awareness of disability rights and inspire those with disabilities.
