= Shri Rawatpura Sarkar University =

State private university in Chhattisgarh, India

- Established: 2018; 8 years ago
- Affiliations: UGC
- Chancellor: Ravi Shankar Ji Maharaj
- Vice-Chancellor: S. K. Singh
- Location: Raipur, Raipur, Chhattisgarh, India
- Website: sruraipur.ac.in

Shri Rawatpura Sarkar University (SRU) is a state private university located in Raipur district, Chhattisgarh, India. It was established in 2018 by the Shri Rawatpura Sarkar Lok Kalyan Trust under the Chhattisgarh Private Universities (Establishmentand Operation) (Amendment) Act, 2018. The foundation stone for its campus in Raipur district was laid on 11 October 2018. The university offers diploma, undergraduate and postgraduate courses in the fields of engineering and technology, science, art, pharmacy, fashion and interior design, management and commerce, library science, education, yoga and naturopathy and journalism and mass communication.
