= Institute of Technology, Guru Ghasidas University =

Public engineering institute in India

Coordinates: 22.1321°N 82.1423°E

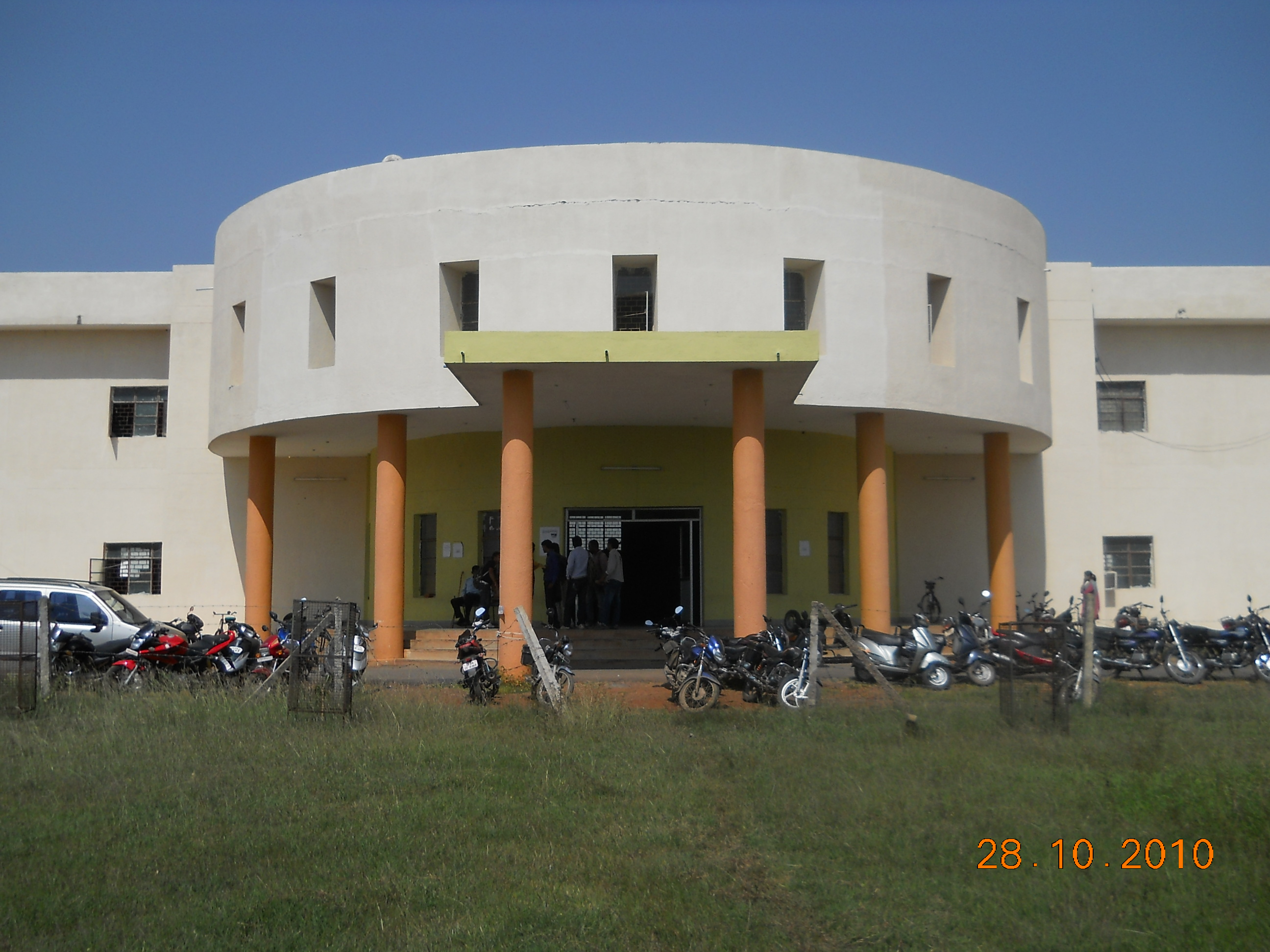
- Type: Public
- Established: 1997
- Parent institution: Guru Ghasidas University
- Dean: Prof. M.C.Rao
- Location: Bilaspur, Chhattisgarh, India
- Campus: Urban
- Website: ggu.ac.in

Institute of Technology, Guru Ghasidas Vishwavidyalaya (ITGGV) or ITGGU, is a public engineering institute located in Bilaspur, Chhattisgarh, India. It was established in 1997 as part of Guru Ghasidas University. It has eight departments. Currently, the students are admitted in Bachelor of Technology through JEE-main.

== Academics ==
The academic year is organised around the semester. The examination procedure consists of two class test, one mid-semester and an end-semester. IT-GGU follows a 10-point CGPA scale. According to decision of academic council of university, student are able to see the checked answer sheets of the main exam.

IT-GGV offers Bachelor of Technology (BTech) in various fields. The courses are based on a four-year, eight-semesters schedule. The first year of the curriculum has common courses from various departments. At the end of the first year, an option to change departments is given to students on the basis of their performance in the first two semesters. The admission to these programs is done through national level Joint Entrance Examination (Main).

IT-GGV also offers Master of Technology (MTech) in various fields. The admission to these programs are carried out mainly based on Graduate Aptitude Test in Engineering (GATE). The institute also offers a PhD degrees.

The institute have eight departments that are Computer Science and Engineering, Information Technology, Artificial intelligence and Data science, Industrial and Production Engineering, Electronics and Communication Engineering, Mechanical Engineering, Chemical Engineering, and Civil Engineering.

== Campus and facilities ==
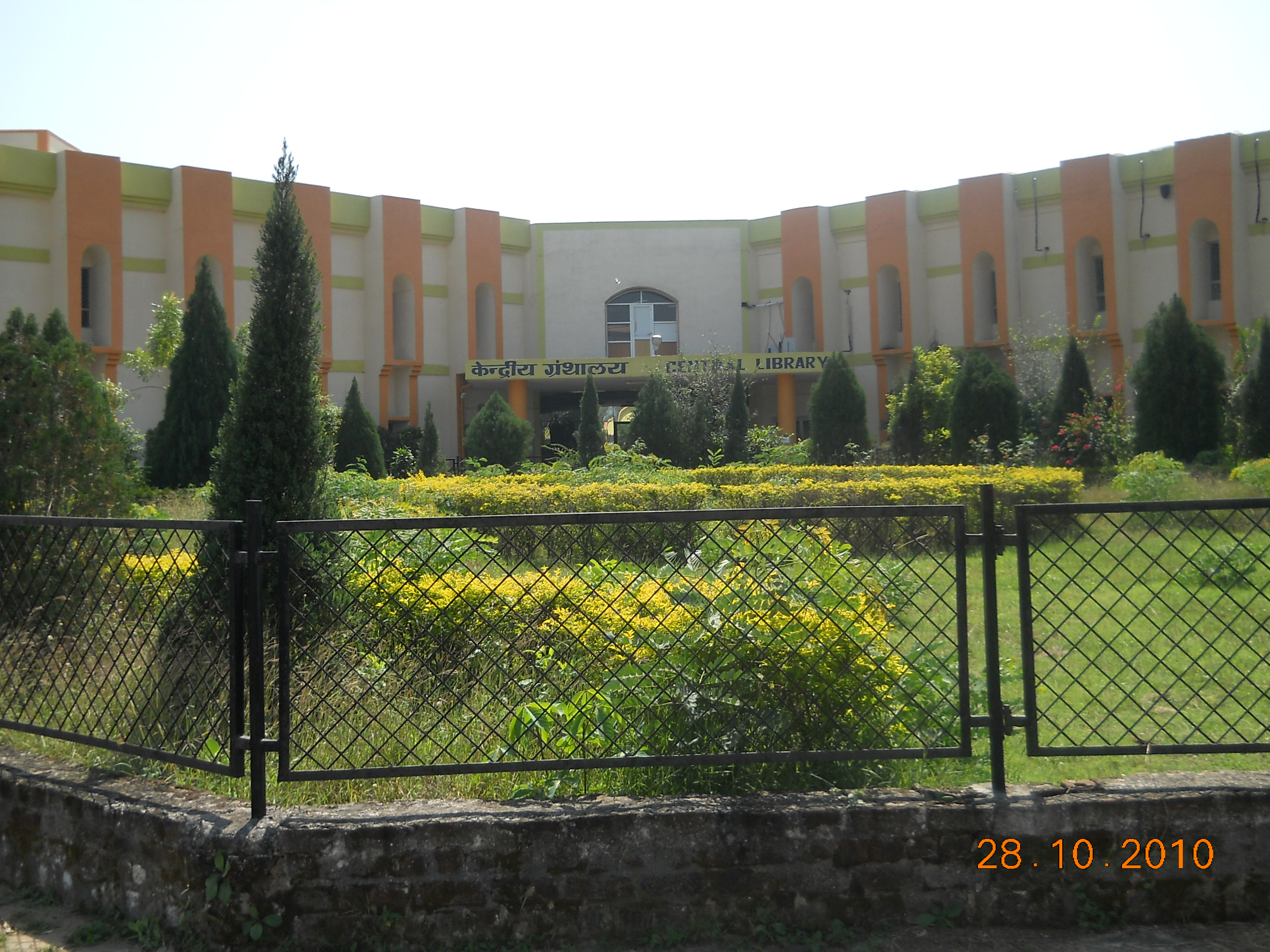
Old IT-building(Central Library)

The institute is located at Koni, a suburban locality five kilometres from Bilaspur. It functions as a university department within the university premises. It operates out of two buildings, the old-IT building and the new-IT building. The old-IT buildings holds the Department of Civil Engineering and first year classes, New-IT building houses other seven branches. Since the college is situated within the university premises, it shares facilities with other departments like Wi-Fi, Central library, Computer Centre, and Auditorium. The institute have its own workshop,E-classroom and Ai Lab.

Hostel facilities are provided for both boys and girls, with separate two hostel for boys and one for girls. University buses ply between Bilaspur and Koni for students living outside the university premises.

== Societies and clubs ==
Societies and clubs organize quiz competitions, debate competitions, extempore competitions, programming events, IQ tests and other events. The societies are as follows:

- SILICON (ECE Branch)
- Utopians of Skills (CSE branch) – Progitggu and Utopians
- ChESS (Chemical Branch)
- Mechanical/IP Club
- ITIOC (IT branch)
- AI Club (AI branch)

== Events and co-curricular activities ==
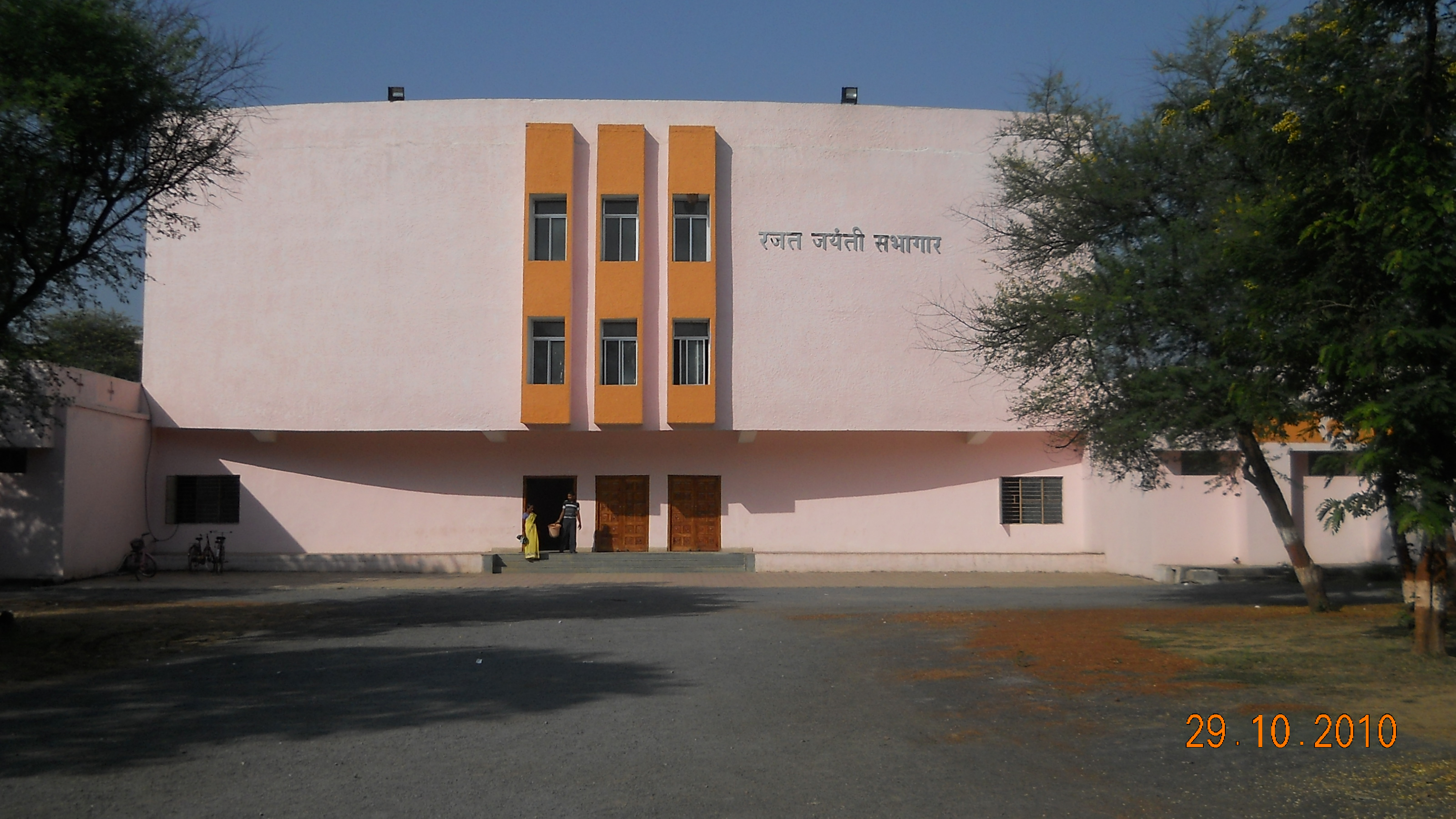
University auditorium

"Kalrav" is the event organised by the sophomores every year to welcome the freshers to the college. The college has an English monthly,"Odyssey", which gives a report of all the happenings, and promotes the students by giving them a platform to write and express.

Students of the college are members of "Udaan", the University Magazine.

Students participate in athletics and other sports events organised by the university and represent the university in inter-university competitions.

The students perform in "Tarang", which are music events organised by students.

=== Equilibrio ===
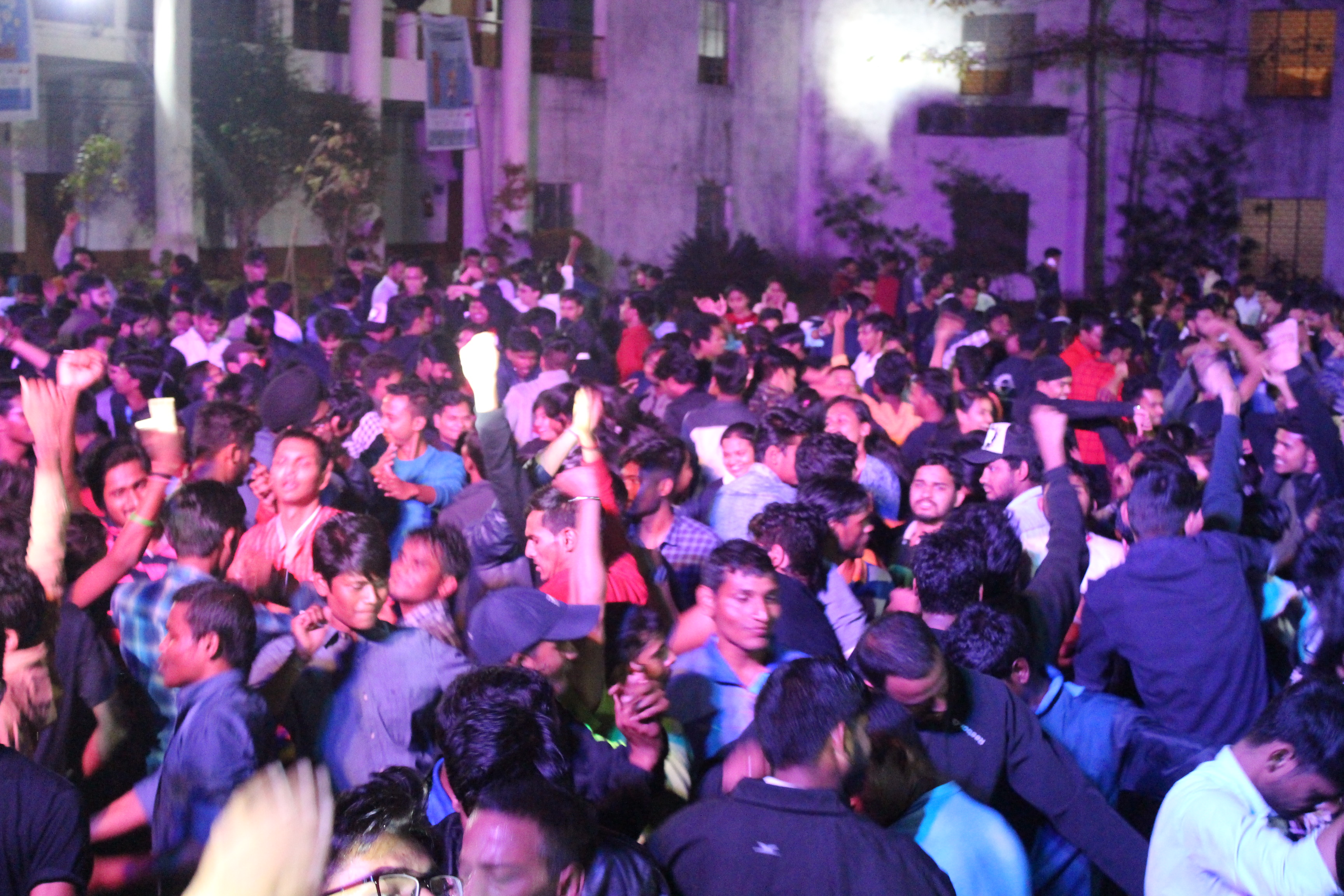
EDM-night at EQUILIBRIO'19

Equilibrio is the annual techno-management festival of IT-GGV. Equilibrio was started in 2013. The first Equilibrio-2013 organised 14 different events like Truss Bridge construction, Robot workshop, Coding X-master, Business entrepreneur, Line follower Robot etc. From the inception various new events like RoboWar, MazeRunner, RoboSoccer, CodeBid are also being inducted.

This is completely student driven festival organised in the month of January annually and acts as hub for various participants from nearby colleges.
