= Chhattisgarh Swami Vivekanand Technical University =

State university in Bhilai, Chhattisgarh, India

- Motto: "Arise! Awake! and stop not until the goal is reached."
- Type: Public State University
- Established: 2005; 21 years ago
- Affiliations: UGC, AICTE
- Chancellor: Governor of Chhattisgarh
- Vice-Chancellor: Dr. Arun Arora
- Location: Bhilai, Chhattisgarh, India, India
- Campus: Urban
- Website: www.csvtu.ac.in

Chhattisgarh Swami Vivekanand Technical University (CSVTU) is a state university located in Bhilai, Chhattisgarh, India.

== History ==
=== Establishment ===
In early 2005, the State Government of Chhattisgarh decided to establish the university with the aim of providing "systematic, efficient and quality education" in the fields of engineering and technology. The relevant act was passed by the Chhattisgarh state assembly on 21 January 2005. Manmohan Singh, then Prime Minister of India, laid the foundation stone of the university in a ceremony held on 30 April 2005.

=== Land and financial aid by Bhilai Steel Plant ===
According to a 2008 news report, the Bhilai Steel Plant, one of the largest steel plants of the country, agreed to donate over 250 acres of land to the Chhattisgarh government for the establishment of the university, along with ₹500 million (US$5.2 million) for related infrastructure development.

=== Adopting industry-academia linkage system ===
After the university adopted an "industry-academia linkage system", a similar system was adopted by five other state universities. The system apparently offers financial rewards for students working on industry-defined problems.

== Management ==
=== Faculties ===
As of 2013 the university offers courses in seven sections which are: Engineering & Technology, Applied Science, Management & Entrepreneurship, Pharmacy, Architecture, Humanities and Ecology & Environment.

=== Reservation of seats for SAIL ===
While the university was still in the planning stage, it was reported that 50 percent of certain postgraduate courses would be reserved for employees of the Steel Authority of India (SAIL), while a small number of places in other courses would be reserved for their children.

=== Affiliations ===
The university affiliates a substantial number of Engineering and Polytechnics colleges in Chhattisgarh: over 60 Engineering colleges and 30 Polytechnics colleges are affiliated. Some of the notable colleges under the university include Bhilai Institute of Technology, Rungta College Bhilai, Government Engineering College, Bilaspur, and Raipur Institute of Technology.
