= Rungta International Skills University =

Private college in Bhilai, India

Rungta International Skills University (RIU), Bhilai
- Rungta University
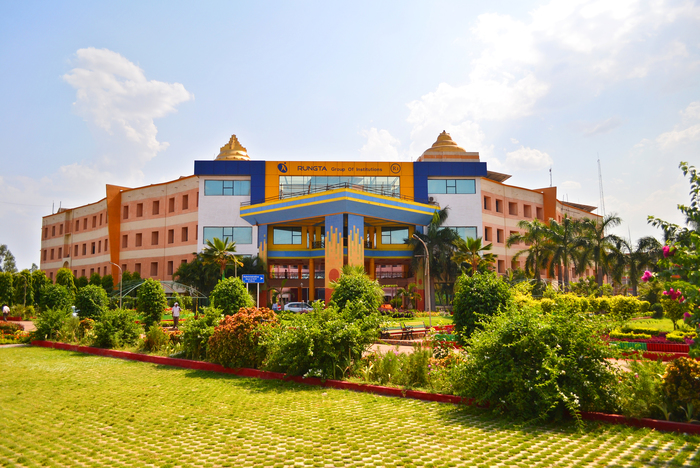
- Type: Private State University
- Established: 1999
- Founder: Ghanshyam Das Rungta
- Accreditation: NAAC, NBA
- Chancellor: Santosh Rungta
- Vice-Chancellor: Jawahar Surisetti
- Location: Rungta Rd, Kohka, Bhilai, Chhattisgarh 490024 - 490024, Bhilai, Chhattisgarh, India; 21.2350°N 81.3462°E
- Campus: Urban, 80 acres
- Website: www.rungta.ac.in
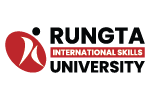

- Location of Bhilai, in Chhattisgarh Location of Bhilai in India

Rungta International Skills University (RIU), Bhilai is a private university located in Central India in the city of Bhilai, Chhattisgarh, India. It was established in 2025 following the reorganisation of Rungta R-1 Engineering College after receiving approval from the Government of Chhattisgarh and UGC.

The university’s academic structure is designed around collaboration with multiple technology and business organisations. As part of its curriculum, students are expected to receive industry-linked certifications from these organisations in addition to their academic degrees. It was also ranked 25th Top Engineering (Private) Colleges in India in 2023 by India Today and ranked 6 by Outlook India as India's top B-Schools 2022

== History and governance ==
=== Inception ===
Rungta College also known as Santosh Rungta Group of Colleges was established in 1999 under the GDR Educational Society for Higher & Technical Education Founded by Ghanshyam Das Rungta. University Chancellor Santosh Rungta expanded it from one engineering college to a group which had one Engineering College -RCET, two pharmacy colleges, and a commerce and science college and converting to Rungta University.

=== Leadership ===
Santosh Rungta is the Chancellor, Sourabh Rungta is the Pro Chancellor, Sonal Rungta is the CEO of the University, and Jawahar Surisetti is the Vice Chancellor of the University.

== Campuses ==
Map of the Rungta College Bhilai campuses

It comprises 13 schools, offering education in disciplines like Engineering, Computer Science, IT, Pharmacy, Research, Life Science, Applied Sciences, Management & Commerce, Skills, Sustainable Development, Film & Media, Humanities and Education.

=== Rungta School of Engineering and Technology ===
Formerly known as RCET Established in 1999, offers undergraduate, postgraduate, doctorate and diploma degrees in engineering and technology.

=== Rungta School of Pharmacy ===
Formerly RCPSR established in 2006, and RIPER established in 2018, offers pharmacy and pharmaceutical sciences programs at Diploma, undergraduate, postgraduate, and doctorate levels, including D.Pharmacy, B.Pharmacy, M. Pharmacy in Pharmacology / Pharmaceutics, and PhD in Pharmaceutical Sciences

=== Rungta School of Basic & Applied Sciences ===
Formerly known as GDRCST established in 2006 received accreditation from the National Council for Teachers Education (NCTE) New Delhi. It offers programs at PG diploma, undergraduate, and postgraduate levels, including B.Sc., B. Com, BBA, BCA, B.A., PGDCA, B.Ed., M.Ed, M.Sc, MSW, D.Ed., B.Ed., M.Ed. etc.

== Ranking and accreditation ==
The National Institutional Ranking Framework (NIRF) ranked Rungta College of Pharmaceutical Sciences and Research (RCPSR) among the top 100 colleges in India.

Rungta College of Engineering & Technology (RCET) was Ranked in 101-150 band in NIRF Innovation Category in 2023.

== Events and community ==
=== Notable annual events ===
SHAASTRARTH - Annual international conference with speakers from prestigious institutions. In 2024, The conference was held on 5 & 6 January 2024 at RCET campus as two-day program for bringing innovation in research. Sanjay S Gaur of NYU presented on augmentative and virtual reality technology and its impact in virtual pilgrimage, health and agriculture.

PLACEMENTNAMAA- An initiative by Rungta Educational Foundation, a mega job fair to help students in the region secure placements.

CHESS- 'Chhattisgarh Entrepreneurship and Startup Summit 2023 under entrepreneurship Awareness Drive (CHESS 2023)', a national-level startup event in Chhattisgarh.

RUHI- The HR Conclave to facilitate the exchange of knowledge and insights through panel discussions, workshops, and networking opportunities within the field of Human Resources.

AICTE Smart India Hackathon - Rungta College (RCET) became the nodal centre for Smart India Hackathon 2023, observing participation of students from 11 states and 178 students.

Other social, cultural, sports and workshops have been organised since 2012. Rungta University hosted a leadership session featuring N. Raghuraman, focusing on time management, decision-making, and career choices.

In December 2025, the AI for Healthy India Challenge was launched under the Bharat Startup Grand Challenge, an initiative by Startup India and the Department for Promotion of Industry and Internal Trade (DPIIT) in collaboration with Rungta University and the Rungta Business Incubator (RuBI). The programme sought to address structural problems in India’s healthcare system, particularly the widespread existence of unstructured clinical data and unequal access to diagnostic and specialist services.

In 2026, Rungta University's Google Student Club member - Kriti Priya was selected as one of the 6 global student ambassadors by Google to attend the AI Impact Summit at Bharat Mandapam and interacted with CEO Sundar Pichai. In March 2026, Rungta University representatives visited Helsinki, Paris, and Athens to study global education systems, examine student well-being, multilingual education, and classical knowledge integration, aiming to adapt international best practices to strengthen higher education in Chhattisgarh under the National Education Policy (2020).

=== International community ===
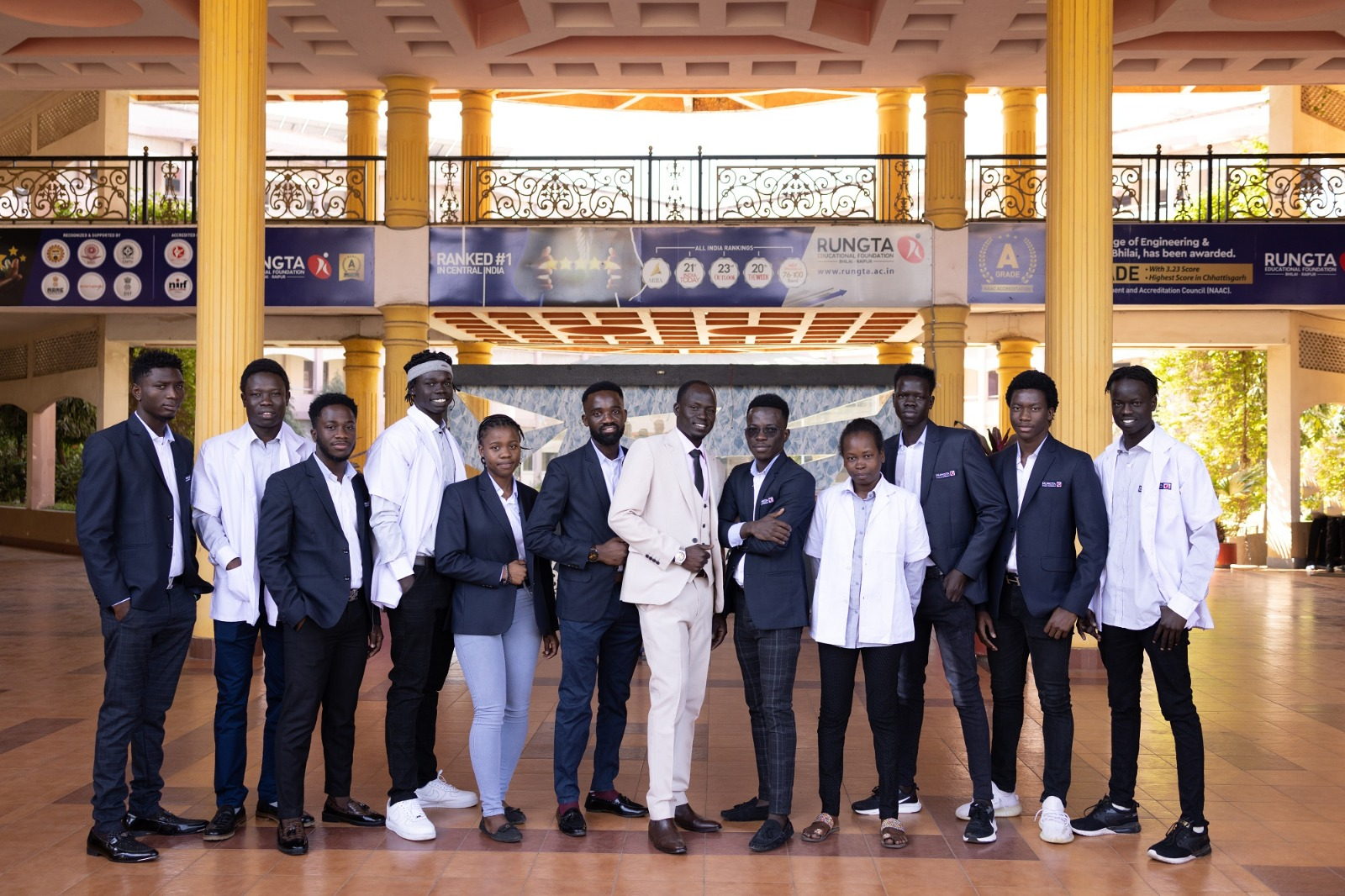
Rungta International Skills University - International Students

Rungta College is the only government-affiliated college in Chhattisgarh that hosts international students from more than 15 countries on its campus. The campus has students from nations, like Nepal, Bhutan, Bangladesh, and different African Countries.

== Research and publication ==
Rungta University has 19 utility patents, 50 Design patents and 23 books with 50 book chapters published. In 2025, 207 patent applications were applied through the online Indian Patent Office, Mumbai, within 12 hours, this academic participation was described as a high volume of patent filing.
