= Bhilai Steel Plant =

Steel plant in Chhattisgarh, India

Coordinates: 21°10′41.08″N 81°23′21.95″E

SAIL-Bhilai Steel Plant

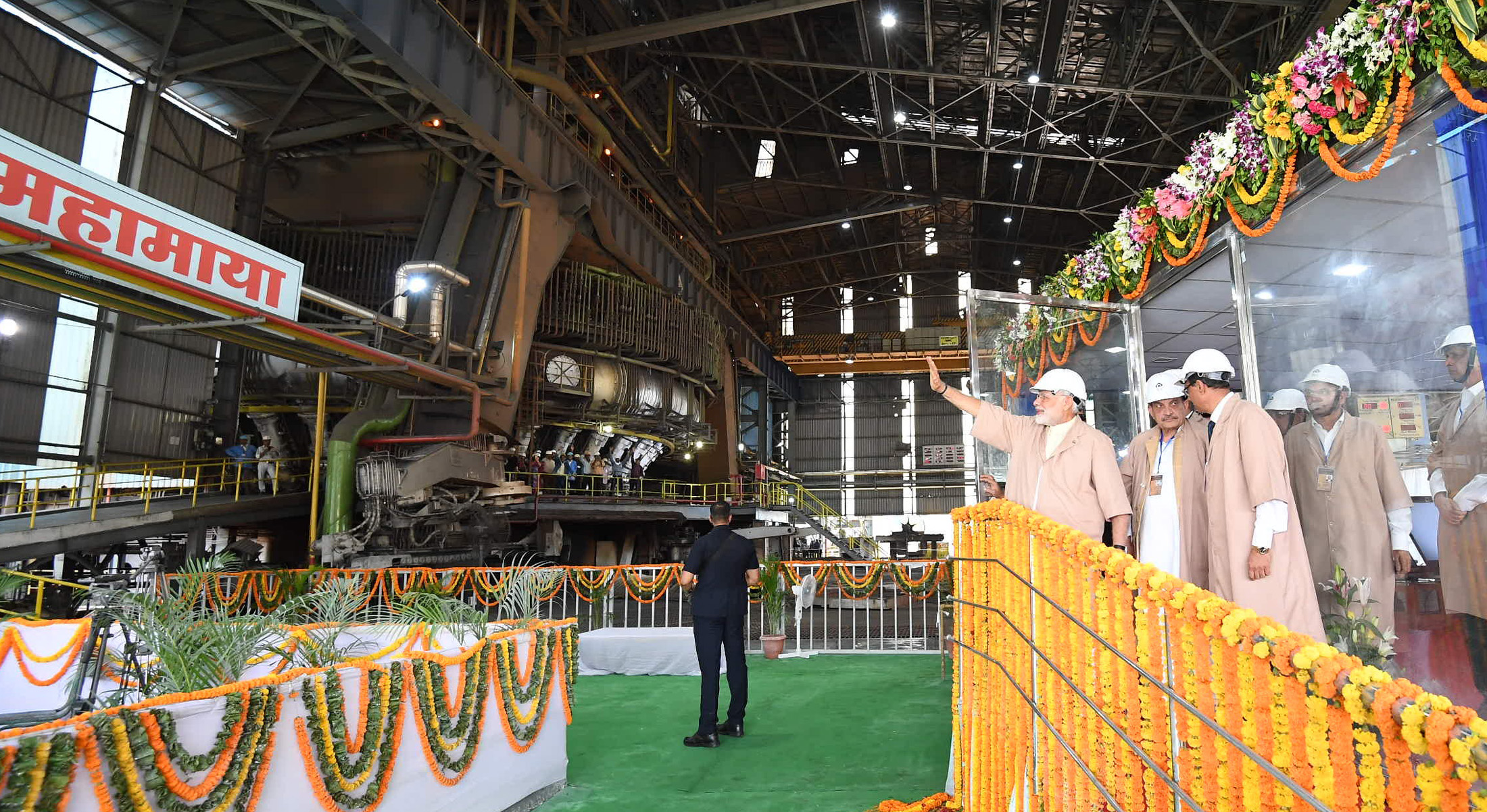
- Prime Minister Narendra Modi reveals the modernised and expanded Bhilai Steel Plant in June 2018
- Industry: Metallurgical Process
- Founded: 1955
- Headquarters: Bhilai, Chhattisgarh, India
- Key people: Chitta Ranjan Mohapatra (MD)
- Products: Rails, Plates, Structurals, Rebars and Wire Rods
- Parent: Steel Authority of India Limited
- Website: sail.co.in/bhilai-steel-plant

The Bhilai Steel Plant (BSP), located in Bhilai, in the Indian state of Chhattisgarh, is India's first and main producer of steel rails, as well as a major producer of wide steel plates and other steel products. The plant also produces steel and markets various chemical by-products from its coke ovens and coal chemical plant. It was set up with the help of the USSR in 1955.

Bhilai Steel Plant is eleven-time winner of the Prime Minister's Trophy for best integrated steel plant in the country. The plant is the sole supplier of the country's longest railway tracks, which measure 260 metres (850 ft). The 130 - meter rail, which would be the world's longest rail line in a single piece, was rolled out on 29 November 2016. The plant also produces products such as wire rods and merchant products. It has been the flagship integrated steel plant unit of the public sector steel company, the Steel Authority of India Limited and is its largest and most profitable production facility.

The Bhilai Steel plant was established with Soviet collaboration in Durg district of Chhattisgarh and started production in 1959. Agarias, A community of iron smelters helped the discovery of a source of iron ore for Bhilai Steel Plant.

== Modernization and expansion programs ==
Bhilai Steel Plant is raising its capacity of steel production through modernization and new projects. The major upcoming project is the commissioning of a giant blast furnace 4,060 cubic meters in volume, with a hot metal production capacity of 8,000 tonnes per day.

The Bhilai Steel Plant has created steel for one of the railway's most challenging projects, construction of the 345 km (214 mi) railway line and plane network between Jammu and Baramulla at an investment of ₹19,000 crore (US$2.0 billion). BSP has also developed a special grade of TMT rebars for use in the high-altitude tunnel inside the Banihal Pass. BSP had also developed the special soft iron magnetic plates for the prestigious India-based Neutrino Observatory (INO) project of the Bhabha Atomic Research Centre (BARC). It has also developed special grade high-tensile (DMR249A) steel for building India's first indigenously built anti-submarine warfare corvette, INS Kamorta. The plant was further expanded on 14 June 2018.

== Output ==
Production
Product mix	Tonnes/annum
Semis	533,000
Rail & heavy structural	750,000
Merchant Products (angles, channels, Rrund & TMT bars)	500,000
Wire Rods (TMT, plain & ribbed)	420,000
Plates (up to 3600 mm wide)	950,000
Total saleable steel	3,153,000

== Impact on local economy and culture ==
BSP, when it was established was the primary industrial employer in the Chhattisgarh region. Its positive impact on the region is visible on various fronts including education, economy and culture. It was once counted among the largest factories in India with almost 60000 employees. Being a public sector enterprise (i.e. Govt of India being the sole stakeholder in the early days) it provided comprehensive benefits package to its employees with subsidized education, healthcare and housing. Like many Public Sector units, Bhilai had a strong organized trade union presence, advocating for worker rights and benefits.

The planned township was organized as 13 sectors. Several Educational institutes sprung up in the township and surrounding towns to cater to educational needs of residents. Bhilai developed into a cultural hub, with many expatriate Soviet experts and engineers residing in the city in the early days. Bhilai also attracted an educated workforce from across India, transforming the culture of the area from a primarily rural, to a cosmopolitan melting pot. Ancillary private factory units grew to process by-products such as slag, scrap and sponge iron, in neighboring cities, creating a thriving local economy in the region, anchored by Bhilai Steel Plant.

== Environmental impact ==
While Bhilai Steel Plant fulfills an essential infrastructure role for the nation, it is largely powered by coal, a highly polluting and fossil fuel. It is an acknowledged fact that the Steel Industry worldwide is a major polluter with the biggest carbon footprint. BSP with its aging plant built using 1950s Soviet know-how, lags comparable Indian steel producers with more modern plants in climate impact areas. The long-term health impacts on BSP employees or citizens have been examined in a few isolated research studies. Emissions, and waste from BSP plant has had an adverse environmental impact, based on anecdotal and limited independent studies available. Mining activities from BSP's multiple captive, especially Dalli Rajhara mines have affected water supply and quality for surrounding villages. The method of open pit mining has resulted in deforestation and depletion of water table for villages near the Dalli Rajhara mines, without any post-damage mitigation for the affected communities.

Additional data and reporting on the environmental and health impacts are required, for Bhilai, given its scale and size.

The CAG Report (2018) also cited this plant for higher than average CO_{2} emission, and reduced energy efficiency. Per the sustainability report published by SAIL, these are some initiatives being driven at BSP, to modernize in an energy efficient way, the aging plant technology -

- Waste heat recovery from Coke Ovens
- Conversion of high top-gas discharge pressure to electrical energy in Blast Furnace (BF) #8
- Installation of Variable Voltage Variable Frequency Drives to reduce energy consumption
- Coal dust injection

Additional BSP green initiatives (Year 2022) are in the Sustainability report.

== Incidents ==
On 12 June 2014, a gas leak in Bhilai Steel Plant killed six people, including two senior officials. Over 50 people were affected by the accident. A breakdown in the water pump house caused a carbon monoxide leak, which seeped into the premises due to pressure differences along the purification chamber lines. Among the dead were two deputy general managers, while the injured included Central Industrial Security Force personnel as well as workers and officials of the public-sector plant. The leak started at around 6:10 pm IST.

On 9 October 2018, 13 plant employees (including four BSP fire services officials) were killed and 14 people (including six BSP fire services officials) were injured in a blast at the plant. The blast occurred in a pipeline near the coke oven section at the steel plant in the town of Bhilai.

A report by the Comptroller and Auditor General of India cited the plant for specific safety violations, thereby creating a hazardous work environment for employees who worked near blast furnaces and coke ovens.

== See also ==
- Steel Authority of India
