= Bhilai =

Metropolis in Chhattisgarh

- Metropolis
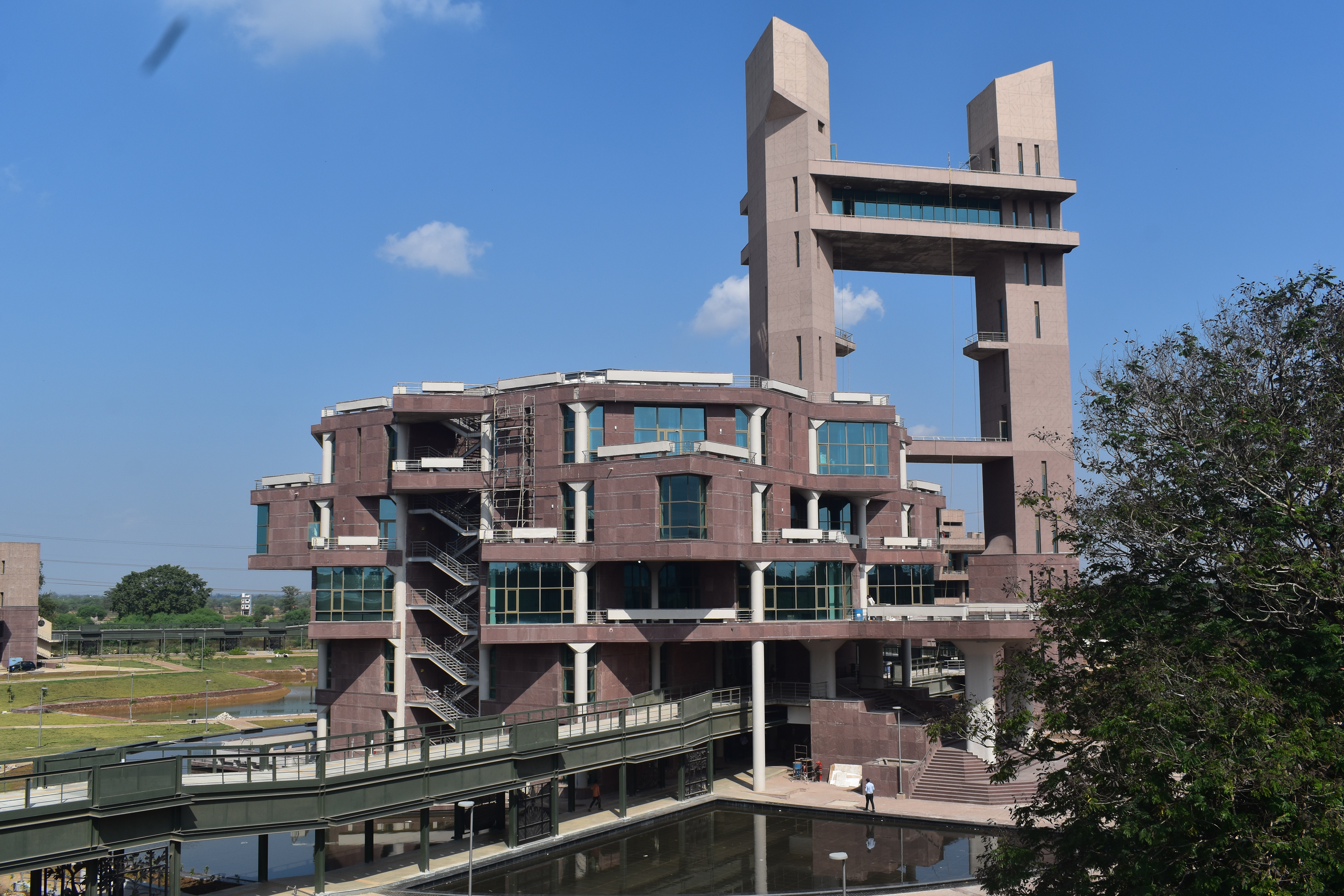
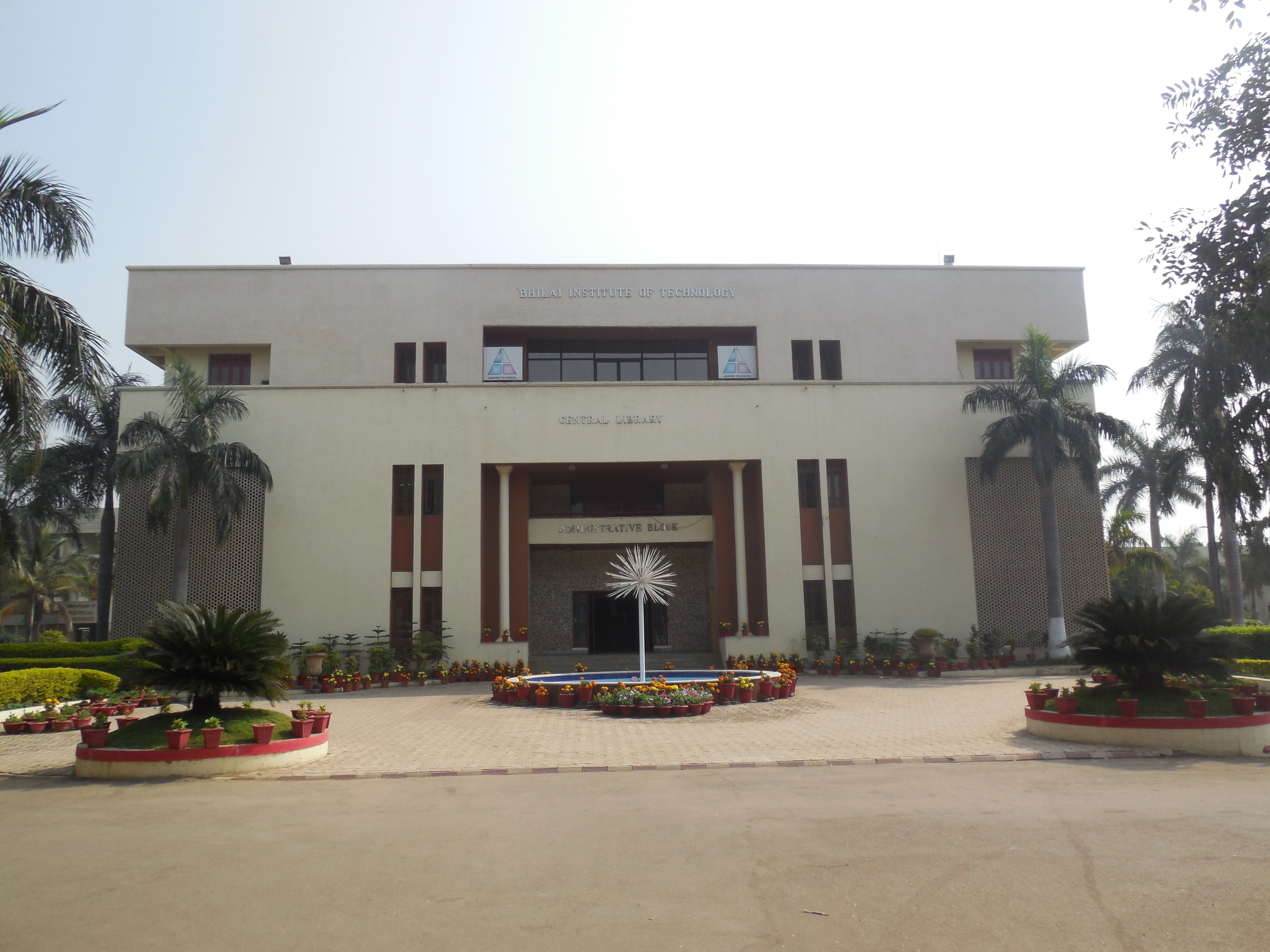
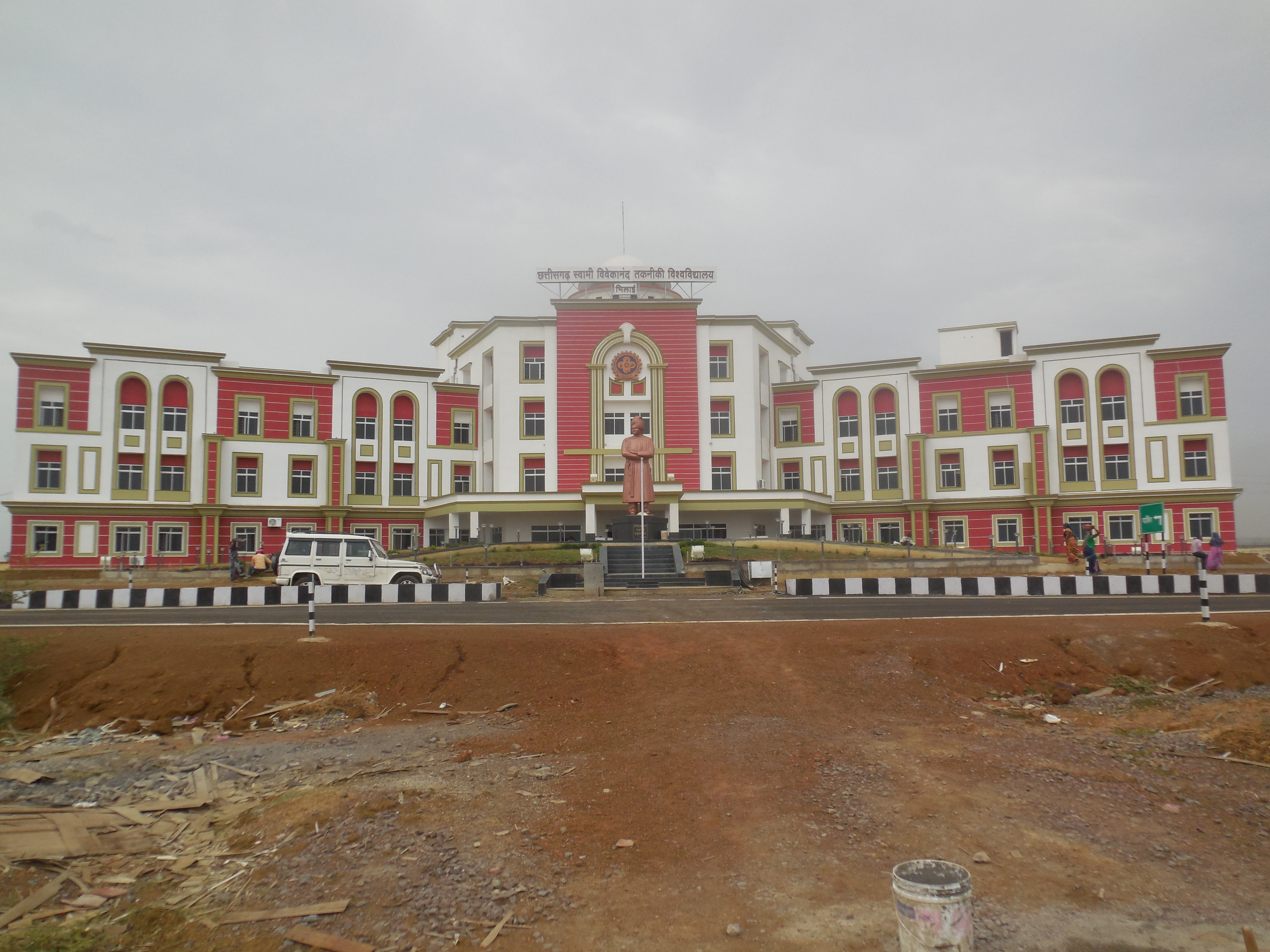
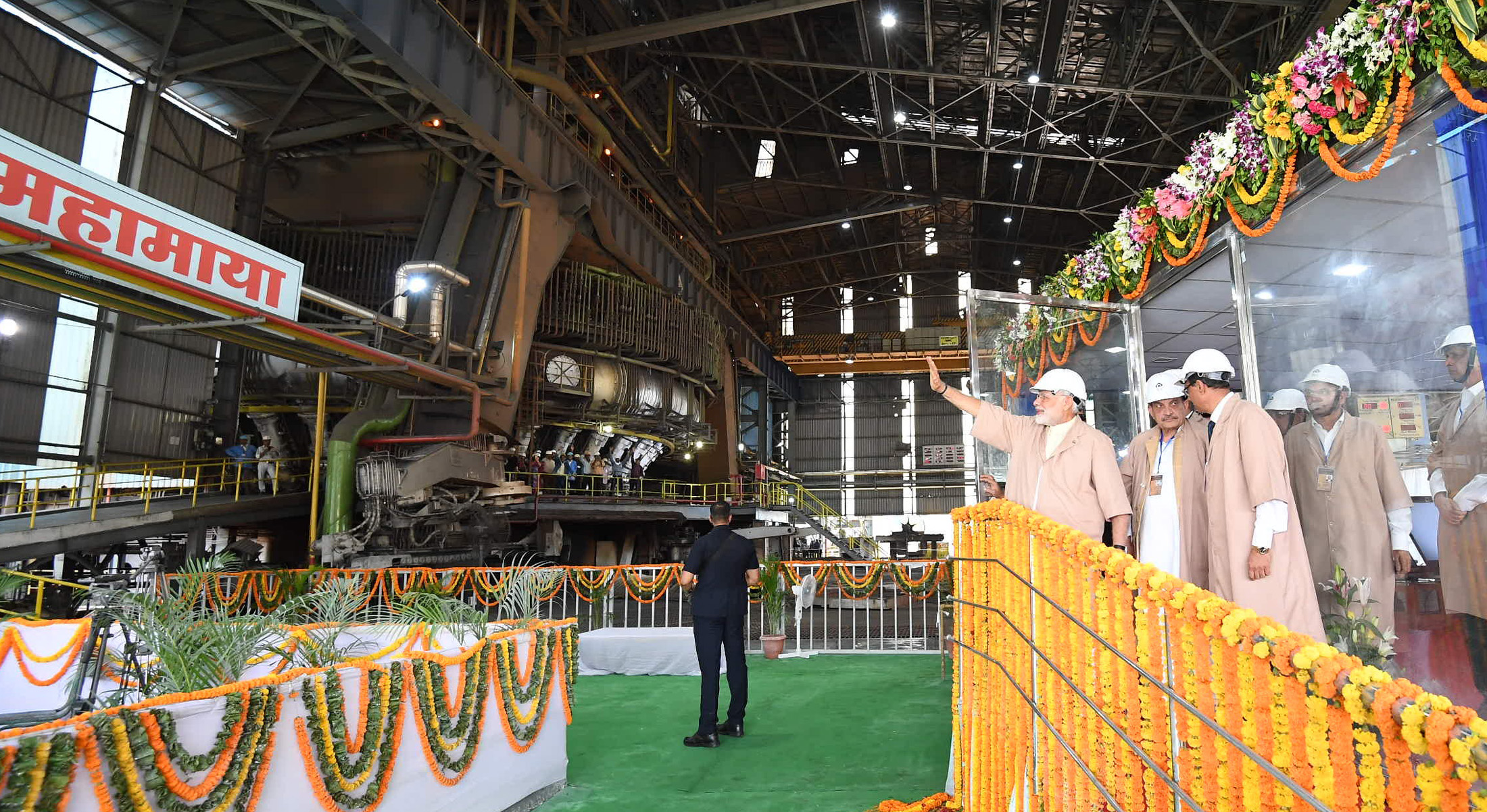
- Indian Institute of Technology, Bhilai Bhilai Institute of Technology Chhattisgarh Swami Vivekanand Technical University Bhilai Steel Plant
- Nickname: Steel City of India
- Location within Chhattisgarh Location within India
- Coordinates: 21.21°N 81.38°E
- Country: India
- State: Chhattisgarh
- District: Durg
- Named for: Bhils

Government
  - Type: Municipal corporation
  - Mayor: Neeraj Pal

Area
  - Metropolis: 357 km^{2} (138 sq mi)
  - Rank: 1st in state
- Elevation: 297 m (974 ft)

Population (2011)
  - Metropolis: 624,700
  - Rank: 2nd in state, 50th in India
  - Density: 1,750/km^{2} (4,530/sq mi)
  - Metro: 1,064,222
  - Metro rank: 50th
- Time zone: UTC+5:30 (IST)
- PIN: 490XXX
- Vehicle registration: CG-07
- Website: www.bhilainagarnigam.com

Bhilai is a city in Durg district of the Indian state of Chhattisgarh, in east-central India. Along with its twin city, Durg, the urban agglomeration of Durg-Bhilai Nagar has a population of more than a million, making it the second most populous urban area in Chhattisgarh, after Raipur. The Bhilai metropolis contains three municipal corporations: Bhilai Municipal Corporation, Bhilai Charoda Municipal Corporation and, Risali Municipal Corporation.

Bhilai is a major industrial and educational hub of central India. The city is home to several industries, including Bhilai Steel Plant, Jaypee Cement, Orient Cement, NSPCL Bhilai Power Plant, Steel Authority of India, FSNL, and ACC Cement. The city is home to the Indian Institute of Technology Bhilai, as well as the Bhilai Institute of Technology. Risali is an emerging urban hub with its own municipal corporation. The city also has the state's oldest zoo, Maitri Bagh.

== Etymology ==
The term Bhilai is derived from the Bhil tribe which originally inhabited this region and continues to dwell in the nearby forests until today.

== History ==
Bhilai was a small village and part of the Haihaiyavansi Kingdom until 1740, when it was conquered by the Marathas.

The foundation of the modern city of Bhilai was laid in 1955, when the Indian government signed a historic agreement with the Soviet Union in Magnitogorsk to establish a steel plant near the village. The plant's first blast furnace was commissioned in 1959 by the first President of India, Dr. Rajendra Prasad.

== Geography ==
Bhilai lies at 21.21°N 81.38°E in Central India at an elevation of 297m above sea level on the banks of the Shivnath river, a tributary of the river Mahanadi. It covers an area of 341 km^{2} (132 sq mi).

According to the Bureau of Indian Standards, the town falls under seismic zone 2, in a scale of 2 to 5 (in order of increasing value of vulnerability to earthquakes).

=== Climate ===
Owing to its proximity to the Tropic of Cancer, Bhilai has a tropical climate. There are three main seasons: summer, monsoon, and winter. The average annual temperature in Bhilai is 26.6 °C and the city receives an average rainfall of 1188 mm in a year. Summers usually last from May to June, followed by monsoons in July and August. The town receives the bulk of rainfall in July, with an average rainfall of 352mm. There is little rainfall during the winters, with November being the driest month of the year.

Durg Bhilai has been ranked 29th best "National Clean Air City" (under Category 1 >10L Population cities) in India.

== Demographics ==
=== Population ===
In the 2011 census, Durg-Bhilainagar Urban Agglomeration had a population of 1,064,222, of which 545,916 are males and 518,306 are females. Bhilai has an average literacy rate of 86.63%, with male literacy at 92.22% and female literacy at 80.71%.

== Government and politics ==
=== Urban administration and governance ===
Pre-1973:

Before the establishment of the Special Area Development Authority in 1973, civic administration and urban services in Bhilai were largely associated with the Bhilai Steel Plant (BSP), which developed and maintained the township as an industrial town. Independent municipal governance structures were not formally constituted during this period.

1973–1998 (SADA period):

In 1973, the Special Area Development Authority (SADA) was established to separate urban governance from the administrative control of BSP. An agreement concluded in 1977, defined the jurisdictional boundaries and taxation powers of SADA. Subsequently, in 1978, BSP transferred approximately 1,920 acres of land to SADA to facilitate municipal administration and planned urban development.

1998–present (Municipal Corporation):

In 1998, Bhilai was constituted as a Municipal Corporation in accordance with the provisions of the 74th Constitutional Amendment to the Constitution of India. All administrative functions, assets, and responsibilities of SADA were transferred to an elected urban local body. This marked a significant transition from company-managed administration to democratic municipal governance.

As per the Ministry of Housing and Urban Affairs, the Bhilai Municipal Corporation reported a revenue of ₹237 crore (US$28 million) and an expenditure of ₹162 crore (US$19 million) in 2022–23. Taxes contributed 25.7% of the revenue, while the corporation received ₹70 crore in grants during the year.

=== Civic administration ===
The Bhilai Municipal Corporation is divided into 5 administrative zones which are further subdivided into wards:

Zone No.	Zone
1	Nehru Nagar
2	Vaishali Nagar
3	Mother Teresa Nagar
4	Shivaji Nagar
5	Sector 06

The Municipal Commissioner of Bhilai Municipal Corporation is Rajeev Kumar Pandey. The Corporation is divided into several departments that handle different municipal functions. These include accounts, general administration, building permissions, property tax, public health, vehicle management, social welfare, and Scheduled Caste and Scheduled Tribe welfare. The corporation also has departments and branches dealing with water supply, census and food, planning, the Pradhan Mantri Awas Yojana, urban livelihoods, and public information.

== Economy ==
Bhilai is home to the Bhilai Steel Plant, the first and largest Indian plant to produce steel rails. The first blast furnace of Bhilai Steel Plant was inaugurated by then President of India Dr. Rajendra Prasad, which was established with assistance from the Soviet Union in 1955.

Iron ore from Rawghat, limestone from Nandini, coal from Jharia, manganese from Balaghat, electric power from the Korba thermal power plant, and water from the Tandula Canal, all nearby, are used at the Bhilai Steel Plant to manufacture rails and structural steel. Pig iron and billets are supplied to foundries and rolling mills located at Kumhari and other sites in central India.

The number of steel rails produced by the facility up to 2007 could, if laid end to end, circle the earth 7.5 times. This is depicted on the monument at Globe Square in the heart of the city. The facility underwent modernisation and expansion and is amongst the leading manufacturers of iron and steel in Asia.

== Transport ==
=== Roadways ===
The twin city of Durg-Bhilai is well connected with a network of national and state highways. Some major highways passing through the city are National Highway 53 (NH-53), SH-7 till Bemetara and SH-22 till Abhanpur. The proposed Durg–Raipur–Arang Expressway will start from Durg and will pass near the outskirts of Bhilai till Arang, which after completion, will enhance connectivity and commute in the state.

=== Rail ===
There are total 15 railway stations in the twin city that includes railway stations serving adjacent and minor neighbourhoods within the city. The main stations are Bhilai Power House railway station and Durg Junction railway station, which are major railway stations, with Durg being the biggest and the busiest, lying on the Howrah–Nagpur–Mumbai line.

=== Bus transport ===
The Durg Bus Station is a hub with buses plying to any place in and around Chhattisgarh as well as other parts of the country, with daily bus services operated by private and government buses to all cities within the state and outside the state, like Bhubaneswar, Nagpur, Jharsuguda, Varanasi, Prayagraj, Kolkata, Patna, Ranchi, Hyderabad, Jabalpur, Visakhapatnam, among others.

=== Metro ===
A light rail, Metrolite or Lite Metro (as referred in India), has been proposed by the Government of Chhattisgarh, which will pass from Naya Raipur to Durg via Raipur and Bhilai.

=== Air ===
The nearest major airport is Swami Vivekananda International Airport at Raipur, located 50 km (31 mi) east from Bhilai. The airport at Bhilai is currently a private airport operated by the Bhilai Steel Plant, located 15 km (9.3 mi) north of the city. In recent years, it has been considered for the airport to be developed to handle commercial operations, and make it a domestic airport.

== Education ==
The city serves as an educational hub in the region, with a total of 59 universities and colleges, like Indian Institute of Technology (IIT) Bhilai, Chhattisgarh Swami Vivekanand Technical University, Bhilai Institute of Technology, Rungta International Skills University, and Shri Shankaracharya Technical Campus, Chhattisgarh Kamdhenu Vishwavidyalaya and Hemchand Yadav Vishwavidyalaya.

Schools in Bhilai are run either by municipal corporations or privately by entities, trusts, and corporations. The majority of schools are affiliated with the Chhattisgarh Board of Secondary Education and the Central Board of Secondary Education.

== Notable people ==
- Teejan Bai, Pandvani singer
- Anurag Basu, Bollywood director
- Anupama Bhagwat, sitar player
- Rajesh Chauhan, a former cricketer in the Indian cricket team
- Budhaditya Mukherjee, sitar player
- Amit Sana, runner-up in Indian Idol 1
- Tejal Shah (born 1979), visual artist, curator
- Shashank Singh, Indian cricketer
- Krishnamurthy Subramanian, 17th Chief Economic Adviser to the Government of India
- Devendra Yadav, MLA Bhilai Nagar and former mayor of Bhilai

== See also ==
- List of cities in Chhattisgarh by population
- Chhattisgarh
- Largest Indian cities by GDP
