= 4th Chhattisgarh Assembly =

4th Legislative Assembly of Chhattisgarh

←	3rd Assembly	5th Assembly	→

Overview
- Legislative body: Chhattisgarh Legislative Assembly
- Election: 2013 Chhattisgarh Legislative Assembly election
- Government: Bharatiya Janata Party
- Opposition: Indian National Congress
- Members: 90
- Speaker: Gaurishankar Agrawal, BJP
- Deputy Speaker: Badridhar Diwan, BJP
- Leader of the House: Raman Singh, BJP
- Leader of the Opposition: T. S. Singh Deo, INC
- Party control: Bharatiya Janata Party

The Fourth Legislative Assembly of Chhattisgarh was constituted after the 2013 Chhattisgarh Legislative Assembly elections which were concluded in November 2013 and the results were declared on 8 December 2013. Incumbent ruling party BJP and Chief Minister Raman Singh retained the majority in assembly and formed government consequently for the third time.

== Party wise distribution of seats ==

Party	No. MLAs	Leader of party in assembly	Leader's constituency
Bharatiya Janata Party	49	Raman Singh	Rajnandgaon
Indian National Congress	39	T. S. Singh Deo	Ambikapur
Bahujan Samaj Party	1	Keshaw Prasad Chandra	Jaijaipur
Independent politician	1	Vimal Chopra	Mahasamund

== Members of Legislative Assembly ==
District	Constituency		Member of Legislative Assembly		Remarks
District	No.	Name	Party	Name	Remarks
Manendragarh-Chirmiri-Bharatpur	1	Bharatpur-Sonhat (ST)	Bharatiya Janata Party	Champa Devi Pawle	
Manendragarh-Chirmiri-Bharatpur	2	Manendragarh	Bharatiya Janata Party	Shyam Bihari Jaiswal	
Koriya	3	Baikunthpur	Bharatiya Janata Party	Bhaiyalal Rajwade	
Surajpur	4	Premnagar	Indian National Congress	Khelsai Singh	
Surajpur	5	Bhatgaon	Indian National Congress	Paras Nath Rajwade	
Balrampur	6	Pratappur (ST)	Bharatiya Janata Party	Ram Sewak Paikra	
Balrampur	7	Ramanujganj (ST)	Indian National Congress	Brihaspat Singh	
Balrampur	8	Samri	Indian National Congress	Pritam Ram	
Surguja	9	Lundra (ST)	Indian National Congress	Chintamani Maharaj	
Surguja	10	Ambikapur	Indian National Congress	T. S. Singh Deo	
Surguja	11	Sitapur (ST)	Indian National Congress	Amarjeet Bhagat	
Jashpur	12	Jashpur (ST)	Bharatiya Janata Party	Rajsharan Bhagat	
Jashpur	13	Kunkuri (ST)	Bharatiya Janata Party	Rohit Kumar Sai	
Jashpur	14	Pathalgaon (ST)	Bharatiya Janata Party	Shivshankar Paikra	
Raigarh	15	Lailunga (ST)	Bharatiya Janata Party	Sunil Rathiya	
Raigarh	16	Raigarh	Bharatiya Janata Party	Roshan Lal	
Sarangarh-Bilaigarh	17	Sarangarh (SC)	Bharatiya Janata Party	Kera Bai Manhar	
Sarangarh-Bilaigarh	18	Kharsia	Indian National Congress	Umesh Patel	
Raigarh	19	Dharamjaigarh (ST)	Indian National Congress	Laljeet Singh Rathia	
Korba	20	Rampur (ST)	Bharatiya Janata Party	Nanki Ram Kanwar	
Korba	21	Korba	Indian National Congress	Jai Singh Agrawal	
Korba	22	Katghora	Bharatiya Janata Party	Lakhan Lal Dewangan	
Korba	23	Pali-Tanakhar (ST)	Indian National Congress	Ram Dayal Uikey	
Gaurela Pendra Marwahi	24	Marwahi (ST)	Indian National Congress	Amit Jogi	
Gaurela Pendra Marwahi	25	Kota	Indian National Congress	Renu Jogi	
Mungeli	26	Lormi	Bharatiya Janta Party	Tokhan Sahu	
Mungeli	27	Mungeli (SC)	Bharatiya Janta Party	Punnulal Mohle	
Bilaspur	28	Takhatpur	Bharatiya Janta Party	Raju Singh Kshatriya	
Bilaspur	29	Bilha	Bharatiya Janta Party	Dharamlal Kaushik	
Bilaspur	30	Bilaspur	Bharatiya Janta Party	Amar Agrawal	
Bilaspur	31	Beltara	Bharatiya Janta Party	Badridhar Deewan	
Bilaspur	32	Masturi (SC)	Indian National Congress	Dilip Lahariya	
Janjgir-Champa	33	Akaltara	Indian National Congress	Chunnilal Sahu	
Janjgir-Champa	34	Janjgir-Champa	Indian National Congress	Moti Lal Dewangan	
Sakti	35	Sakti	Bharatiya Janata Party	Khilawan Sahu	
Sakti	36	Chandrapur	Bharatiya Janata Party	Yudhvir Singh Judev	
Sakti	37	Jaijaipur	Bahujan Samaj Party	Keshaw Prasad Chandra	
Janjgir-Champa	38	Pamgarh (SC)	Bharatiya Janata Party	Ambesh Jangde	
Mahasamund	39	Saraipali (SC)	Bharatiya Janata Party	Ramlal Chauhan	
Mahasamund	40	Basna	Bharatiya Janta Party	Rupkumari Choudhary	
Mahasamund	41	Khallari	Bharatiya Janata Party	Chunni Lal Sahu	
Mahasamund	42	Mahasamund	Independent politician	Vimal Chopra	
Sarangarh-Bilaigarh	43	Bilaigarh (SC)	Bharatiya Janata Party	Sanam Kumar Jangre	
Baloda Bazar	44	Kasdol	Bharatiya Janata Party	Gauri Shankar Agrawal	
Baloda Bazar	45	Baloda Bazar	Indian National Congress	Janak Ram Verma	
Baloda Bazar	46	Bhatapara	Bharatiya Janata Party	Shivratan Sharma	
Raipur	47	Dharsiwa	Bharatiya Janata Party	Devji bhai Patel	
Raipur	48	Raipur Rural	Indian National Congress	Satyanarayan Sharma	
Raipur	49	Raipur City West	Bharatiya Janata Party	Rajesh Munat	
Raipur	50	Raipur City North	Bharatiya Janata Party	Shrichand Sundarani	
Raipur	51	Raipur City South	Bharatiya Janata Party	Brijmohan Agrawal	
Raipur	52	Arang	Bharatiya Janata Party	Naveen Markandey	
Raipur	53	Abhanpur	Indian National Congress	Dhanendra Sahu	
Gariaband	54	Rajim	Indian National Congress	Amitesh Shukla	
Gariaband	55	Bindrawagarh (ST)	Bharatiya Janata Party	Goverdhan Singh Manjhi	
Dhamtari	56	Sihawa (ST)	Bharatiya Janata Party	Shravan Markam	
Dhamtari	57	Kurud	Bharatiya Janata Party	Ajay Chandrakar	
Dhamtari	58	Dhamtari	Indian National Congress	Gurumukh Singh Hora	
Balod	59	Sanjari-Balod	Indian National Congress	Bhaiya Ram Sinha	
Balod	60	Dondi Lohara (ST)	Indian National Congress	Anila Bhendiya	
Balod	61	Gunderdehi	Indian National Congress	Rajendra Kumar Rai	
Durg	62	Patan	Indian National Congress	Bhupesh Baghel	
Durg	63	Durg Rural	Bharatiya Janata Party	Ranshila Sahu	
Durg	64	Durg City	Indian National Congress	Arun Vora	
Durg	65	Bhilai Nagar	Bharatiya Janta Party	Prem Prakash Pandey	
Durg	66	Vaishali Nagar	Bharatiya Janata Party	Vidya Ratan Bhasin	
Durg	67	Ahiwara (SC)	Bharatiya Janata Party	Sanwala Ram Dahre	
Bemetara	68	Saja	Indian National Congress	Ravindra Choubey	
Bemetara	69	Bemetara	Bharatiya Janata Party	Avdhesh Chandel	
Bemetara	70	Navagarh (SC)	Bharatiya Janata Party	Dayaldas Baghel	
Kabirdham	71	Pandariya	Bharatiya Janata Party	Moti Ram Chandravanshi	
Kabirdham	72	Kawardha	Bharatiya Janata Party	Ashok Sahu	
Rajnandgaon	73	Khairagarh	Indian National Congress	Girvar Janghel	
Rajnandgaon	74	Dongargarh (SC)	Bharatiya Janata Party	Sarojini Banjare	
Rajnandgaon	75	Rajnandgaon	Bharatiya Janta Party	Dr. Raman Singh	Chief minister
Rajnandgaon	76	Dongargaon	Indian National Congress	Daleshwar Sahu	
Rajnandgaon	77	Khujji	Indian National Congress	Bholaram Sahu	
Rajnandgaon	78	Mohla-Manpur	Indian National Congress	Tej kumar Netam	
Kanker	79	Antagarh (ST)	Bharatiya Janta Party	Bhojraj Nag	
Kanker	80	Bhanupratappur (ST)	Indian National Congress	Manoj Singh Mandavi	
Kanker	81	Kanker (ST)	Indian National Congress	Shankar Lal dhruw	
Kondagaon	82	Keshkal (ST)	Indian National Congress	Santram Netam	
Kondagaon	83	Kondagaon (ST)	Indian National Congress	Mohan Lal Markam	
Narayanpur	84	Narayanpur (ST)	Bharatiya Janta Party	Kedar Nath Kashyap	
Bastar	85	Bastar (ST)	Indian National Congress	Lakheshwar Baghel	
Bastar	86	Jagdalpur	Bharatiya Janta Party	Santosh Bafna	
Bastar	87	Chitrakot (ST)	Indian National Congress	Deepak Baij	
Dantewada	88	Dantewada (ST)	Indian National Congress	Devati Karma	
Bijapur	89	Bijapur (ST)	Bharatiya Janata Party	Mahesh Gagda	
Sukma	90	Konta (ST)	Indian National Congress	Kawasi Lakhma	

== See also ==
- Chhattisgarh Legislative Assembly
- 2018 Chhattisgarh Legislative Assembly election
