= List of speakers of the Chhattisgarh Legislative Assembly =

Speaker of Chhattisgarh

Speaker of the Chhattisgarh Legislative Assembly
- Emblem of Chhattisgarh

- Flag of India

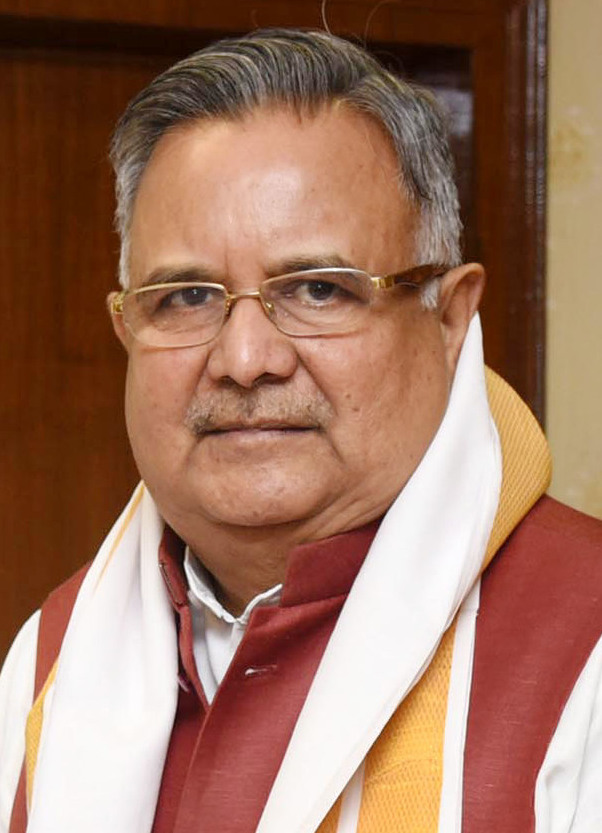
- Incumbent; Raman Singh since 10 December 2023
- Chhattisgarh Legislative Assembly
- Member of: Chhattisgarh Legislative Assembly
- Appointer: Members of the Chhattisgarh Legislative Assembly
- Term length: During the life of the Chhattisgarh state assembly (five years maximum)
- Inaugural holder: Rajendra Prasad Shukla
- Deputy: vacant

The speaker of the Chhattisgarh Legislative Assembly is the presiding officer of the Legislative Assembly of Chhattisgarh, the main law-making body for the Indian state of Chhattisgarh. He is elected by the members of the Chhattisgarh Legislative Assembly. The speaker is always a member of the Legislative Assembly.

== List of speakers ==
#	Portrait	Name	Constituency	Term			Assembly	Party
1		Rajendra Prasad Shukla	Kota	14 December 2000	19 December 2003	3 years, 5 days	1st	Indian National Congress
2		Prem Prakash Pandey	Bhilai Nagar	22 December 2003	5 January 2009	5 years, 14 days	2nd	Bharatiya Janata Party
3		Dharamlal Kaushik	Bilha	5 January 2009	6 January 2014	5 years, 1 day	3rd	Bharatiya Janata Party
4		Gaurishankar Agrawal	Kasdol	6 January 2014	3 January 2019	4 years, 362 days	4th	Bharatiya Janata Party
5		Charan Das Mahant	Sakti	4 January 2019	10 December 2023	4 years, 340 days	5th	Indian National Congress
6		Raman Singh	Rajnandgaon	10 December 2023	incumbent	2 years, 346 days	6th	Bharatiya Janata Party

== List of Deputy Speakers ==
#	Portrait	Name	Constituency	Term			Assembly	Party
1		Banwari Lal Agrawal	Katghora	28 March 2001	9 March 2003	1 year, 346 days	1st	Bharatiya Janata Party
2		Dharmjeet Singh Thakur	Lormi	13 March 2003	5 December 2003	267 days	1st	Indian National Congress
3		Badridhar Deewan	Sipat	12 July 2005	11 December 2008	3 years, 152 days	2nd	Bharatiya Janata Party
4		Narayan Chandel	Janjgir-Champa	2 August 2010	11 December 2013	3 years, 131 days	3rd	Bharatiya Janata Party
(3)		Badridhar Deewan	Beltara	23 July 2015	12 December 2018	3 years, 142 days	4th	Bharatiya Janata Party
5		Manoj Singh Mandavi	Bhanupratappur	2 December 2019	16 October 2022	2 years, 318 days	5th	Indian National Congress
6		Santram Netam	Keshkal	4 January 2023	10 December 2023	340 days	5th	Indian National Congress
7		Vacancy		15 December 2023	Incumbent	2 years, 341 days	6th	Bharatiya Janata Party

== Pro tem Speaker ==
=== List of Pro tem Speakers ===
- Mahendra Bhadur Singh Interim
- Rajendra Prasad Shukla 2003
- Potaram Kanwar 2008
- Satyanarayana Sarma 2013
- Rampukar Singh 2018
- Ramvichar Netam 2023
