= List of leaders of the opposition in the Chhattisgarh Legislative Assembly =

Person who leads official opposition

Leader of the Opposition of the Chhattisgarh Legislative Assembly
- Seal of Chhattisgarh Government

- Flag of India

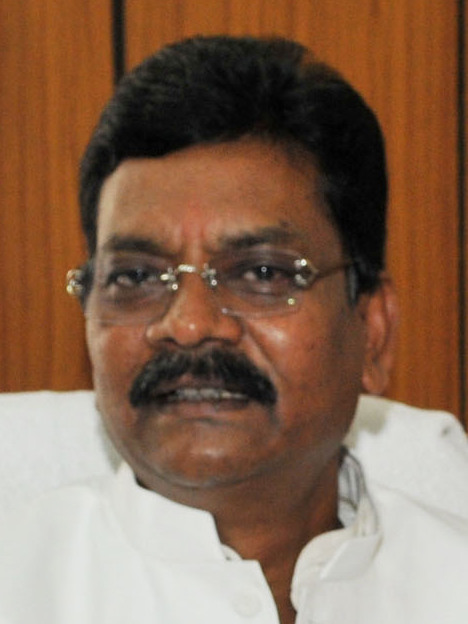
- Incumbent; Charan Das Mahant since 16 December 2023
- Style: The Hon’ble
- Member of: Chhattisgarh Legislative Assembly
- Nominator: Members of the Official Opposition of the Legislative Assembly
- Appointer: Speaker of the Assembly
- Term length: 5 years Till the Assembly Continues
- Precursor: List of leaders of the opposition in the Madhya Pradesh Legislative Assembly
- Inaugural holder: Nand Kumar Sai

The leader of the opposition in the Chhattisgarh Legislative Assembly is the politician who leads the official opposition in the Chhattisgarh Legislative Assembly.

== Eligibility ==
Official Opposition is a term used in Chhattisgarh Legislative Assembly to designate the political party which has secured the second largest number of seats in the assembly. In order to get formal recognition, the party must have at least 10% of total membership of the Legislative Assembly. A single party has to meet the 10% seat criterion, not an alliance. Many of the other Indian state legislatures also follow this 10% rule while the rest of them prefer single largest opposition party according to the rules of their respective houses.

== Role ==
The opposition's main role is to question the government of the day and hold them accountable to the public. The opposition is equally responsible in upholding the best interests of the people of the country. They have to ensure that the Government does not take any steps, which might have negative effects on the people of the country.

The role of the opposition in legislature is basically to check the excesses of the ruling or dominant party, and not to be totally antagonistic. There are actions of the ruling party which may be beneficial to the masses and opposition is expected to support such steps.

In legislature, opposition party has a major role and must act to discourage the party in power from acting against the interests of the country and the common man. They are expected to alert the population and the Government on the content of any bill, which is not in the best interests of the country.

== List of leaders of the opposition ==
No	Portrait	Name	Constituency	Tenure			Assembly	Chief Minister	Party
1		Nand Kumar Sai	Tapkara	14 December 2000	5 December 2003	2 years, 356 days	1st	Ajit Jogi	Bharatiya Janata Party
2		Mahendra Karma	Dantewara	22 December 2003	11 December 2008	4 years, 355 days	2nd	Raman Singh	Indian National Congress
3		Ravindra Choubey	Saja	5 January 2009	11 December 2013	4 years, 340 days	3rd	Raman Singh	Indian National Congress
4		T. S. Singh Deo	Ambikapur	6 January 2014	12 December 2018	4 years, 340 days	4th	Raman Singh	Indian National Congress
5		Dharamlal Kaushik	Bilha	4 January 2019	17 August 2022	3 years, 225 days	5th	Bhupesh Baghel	Bharatiya Janata Party
6		Narayan Chandel	Janjgir-Champa	18 August 2022	3 December 2023	1 year, 107 days	5th	Bhupesh Baghel	Bharatiya Janata Party
7		Charan Das Mahant	Sakti	16 December 2023	Incumbent	2 years, 265 days	6th	Vishnu Deo Sai	Indian National Congress

== See also ==
- Government of Chhattisgarh
- Governor of Chhattisgarh
- Chief Minister of Chhattisgarh
- Chhattisgarh Legislative Assembly
- List of current Indian opposition leaders
