= 2003 Chhattisgarh Legislative Assembly election =

State assembly elections in India

2003 Chhattisgarh legislative assembly election
- 1 December 2003

All 90 seats to the Legislative Assembly 46 seats needed for a majority
- Turnout: 71.30%
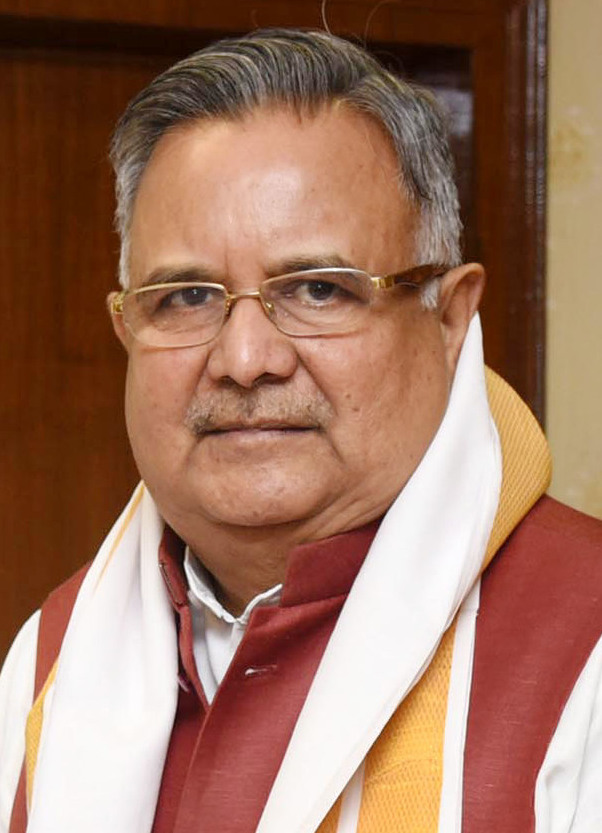

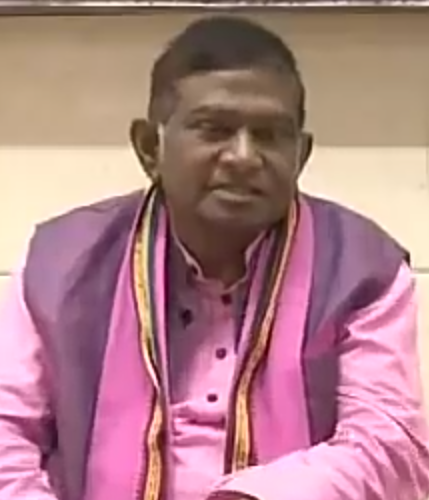

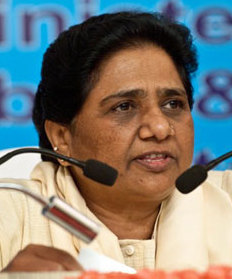

	First party	Second party
Leader	Raman Singh	Ajit Jogi
Party	BJP	INC
Leader since	7 December 2003	24 July 1999
Leader's seat	Did Not Contest	Marwahi
Seats won	50	37
Seat change	▲14	▼17
Percentage	39.26%	36.71%
	Third party	Fourth party
Leader	Mayawati	Sharad Pawar
Party	BSP	NCP
Alliance	-	-
Leader since	18 September 2003	10 June 1999
Leader's seat	did not contest	did not contest
Seats won	2	1
Seat change	▲2	▲1
Percentage	4.45%	7.02%
CM before election
Ajit Jogi
INC
Elected CM
Raman Singh
BJP

Legislative Assembly elections were held in Chhattisgarh in December 2003, electing the 90 members of the first Chhattisgarh Legislative Assembly. 2003 elections were the first election in Chhattisgarh after its formation from Madhya Pradesh. The results of the election were announced in early December. Incumbent Chief Minister Ajit Jogi lost the election, while Bharatiya Janata Party won the elections. Raman Singh was sworn in as chief minister.

== Interim Chhattisgarh Legislative Assembly (2000-2003) ==
Party	Symbol	Leader(s)	Seats
Indian National Congress		Ajit Jogi	54
Bharatiya Janata Party		Tarachand Sahu; Raman Singh	36
Total			90

== Results ==
=== Party-wise ===
Summary of the Chhattisgarh Legislative Assembly election result
Parties and Coalitions	Popular vote			Seats		
Parties and Coalitions	Vote	%	+/-	Contested	Won	+/-
Bharatiya Janata Party	37,89,914	39.26		90	50	
Indian National Congress	35,43,754	36.71		90	37	
Bahujan Samaj Party	4,29,334	4.45		54	2	
Nationalist Congress Party	6,77,983	7.02		89	1	
Independents	6,86,942	7.12		254	0	
Total	96,53,571	100.00		90	100.00	±0

=== Region-wise ===
Division	Seats			
Division	Seats	BJP	INC	OTH
Surguja	14	10	4	—N/a
Central Chhattisgarh	64	31	30	3
Bastar	12	9	3	—N/a
Total	90	50	37	3

=== District-wise ===
District	Seats			
District	Seats	BJP	INC	OTH
Koriya	2	—N/a	2	—N/a
Surguja	8	7	1	—N/a
Jashpur	4	3	1	—N/a
Raigarh	6	3	2	1
Korba	3	1	2	—N/a
Bilaspur	10	3	7	—N/a
Janjgir-Champa	6	1	3	2
Raipur	13	5	8	—N/a
Mahasamund	4	4	—N/a	—N/a
Dhamtari	3	3	—N/a	—N/a
Kanker	2	2	—N/a	—N/a
Bastar	7	7	—N/a	—N/a
Dantewada	3	—N/a	3	—N/a
Durg	11	7	4	—N/a
Rajnandgaon	6	4	2	—N/a
Kabirdham	2	—N/a	2	—N/a
Total	90	50	37	3

=== Constituency-wise ===
Constituency		Winner			Runner Up			Margin
#	Name	Candidate	Party	Votes	Candidate	Party	Votes	Margin
Koriya district
1	Manendragarh (ST)	Gulab Singh	INC	41515	Ram Lakhan Singh	BJP	33989	7526
2	Baikunthpur	Ram Chandra Singh Deo	INC	51107	Bhaiyalal Rajwade	BJP	43137	7970
Surguja district
3	Premnagar (ST)	Renuka Singh	BJP	48363	Tuleshwar Singh	INC	30611	17752
4	Surajpur (ST)	Shiv Pratap Singh	BJP	51228	Bhanu Pratap Singh	INC	23717	27511
5	Pal (ST)	Ramvichar Netam	BJP	36309	Brihaspat Singh	INC	26096	10213
6	Samri (ST)	Siddha Nath Paikra	BJP	31878	Maheswar Paikara	INC	18496	13382
7	Lundra (ST)	Vijaya Nath	BJP	34357	Ramdev Ram	INC	34315	42
8	Pilkha (ST)	Ram Sewak Paikra	BJP	59967	Prem Sai Singh Tekam	INC	39466	20501
9	Ambikapur (ST)	Kamalbhan Singh Marabi	BJP	65812	Madan Gopal Singh	INC	28590	37222
10	Sitapur (ST)	Amarjeet Bhagat	INC	35369	Raja Ram Bhagat	BJP	30267	5102
Jashpur district
11	Bagicha (ST)	Ganesh Ram Bhagat	BJP	43846	Anand Lal Kujur	INC	33274	10572
12	Jashpur (ST)	Raj Sharan Bhagat	BJP	45295	Vikaram Bhagat	INC	35732	9563
13	Tapkara (ST)	Bharat Sai	BJP	42213	Mohan Sai	INC	28622	13591
14	Pathalgaon (ST)	Rampukar Singh Thakur	INC	37205	Vishnudeo Sai	BJP	36888	317
Raigarh district
15	Dharamjaigarh (ST)	Om Prakash Rathia	BJP	50148	Chanesh Ram Rathiya	INC	34530	15618
16	Lailunga (ST)	Satyanand Rathia	BJP	41165	Prem Singh Sidar	INC	35275	5890
17	Raigarh	Vijay Agrawal	BJP	52310	Krishna Kumar	INC	43871	8439
18	Kharsia	Nand Kumar Patel	INC	70433	Laxmi Prasad Patel	BJP	37665	32768
19	Saria	Shakajeet Nayak	INC	39962	Virajeshwar Pradhan	Ind	21669	18293
20	Sarangarh (SC)	Kamda Jolhe	BSP	32577	Shyam Sunder	BJP	24419	8158
Korba district
21	Rampur (ST)	Nanki Ram Kanwar	BJP	35642	Pyarelal Kanwar	INC	35262	380
22	Katghora	Bodhram Kanwar	INC	79049	Banwari Lal Agrawal	BJP	75196	3853
23	Tanakhar (ST)	Ram Dayal Uike	INC	48844	Hira Singh Markam	GGP	28531	20313
Bilaspur district
24	Marwahi (ST)	Ajit Jogi	INC	76269	Nand Kumar Sai	BJP	22119	54150
25	Kota	Rajendra Prasad Shukla	INC	39545	Bhupendra Singh	BJP	37866	1679
26	Lormi	Dharmjeet Singh Thakur	INC	47998	Muniram Sahu	BJP	32332	15666
27	Mungeli (SC)	Chandrabhan	INC	41377	Vikram Mohile	BJP	34621	6756
28	Jarhagaon (SC)	Churawan Mangeshkar	INC	46744	Chouwadas Khandekar	BJP	34759	11985
29	Takhatpur	Balram Singh	INC	39362	Jagjeet Singh Makkad	BJP	32671	6691
30	Bilaspur	Amar Agrawal	BJP	61154	Anil Kumar Tah	INC	55311	5843
31	Bilha	Siyaram Kaushik	INC	48028	Dharamlal Kaushik	BJP	41477	6551
32	Masturi (SC)	Krishnamurti Bandhi	BJP	40485	Madan Singh Dharia	INC	38217	2268
33	Sipat	Badhridhar Diwan	BJP	22649	Ramesh Kaushik	INC	22350	299
Janjgir–Champa district
34	Akaltara	Ramadhar	INC	37368	Chhataram	BJP	35938	1430
35	Pamgarh	Mahant Ram Sundar Das	INC	42780	Dauram	BSP	36046	6734
36	Champa	Motilal Dewangan	INC	52075	Narayan Chandel	BJP	44365	7710
37	Sakti	Megharam Sahu	BJP	27680	Manharan Rathore	INC	24408	3272
38	Malkharoda (SC)	Lalsay Khunte	BSP	34360	Nirmal Sinha	BJP	33464	896
39	Chandrapur	Nobel Kumar Verma	NCP	31929	Krishnakant Chandra	BJP	19498	12431
Raipur district
40	Raipur Town	Brijmohan Agrawal	BJP	70164	Gajraj Pagariya	INC	44190	25974
41	Raipur Rural	Rajesh Munat	BJP	104448	Tarun Chatterji	INC	66449	37999
42	Abhanpur	Dhanendra Sahu	INC	51122	Chandra Shekhar Sahu	BJP	50895	227
43	Mandirhasod	Satyanarayan Sharma	INC	27009	Sobharam Yadav	BJP	25182	1827
44	Arang (SC)	Sanjay Dhidhi	BJP	48556	Ganguram Baghel	INC	30112	18444
45	Dharsiwa	Deoji Bhai	BJP	57637	Chhaya Verma	INC	41520	16117
46	Bhatapara	Chaitram Sahu	INC	45398	Shivratan Sharma	BJP	43453	1945
47	Baloda Bazar	Ganesh Shankar Bajpai	INC	23642	Vipin Bihari Verma	BJP	23333	309
48	Pallari (SC)	Shiv Kumar Dahria	INC	40814	Durga Prasad Maheshwar	BJP	38112	2702
49	Kasdol	Rajkamal Singhania	INC	48024	Gaurishankar Agrawal	BJP	43002	5022
50	Bhatgaon (SC)	Hari Das Bhardwaj	INC	34741	Bhushan Lal Jangde	BJP	26519	8222
51	Rajim	Chandu Lal Sahu	BJP	57798	Amitesh Shukla	INC	45922	11876
52	Bindrawagarh (ST)	Omkar Shah	INC	53209	Goverdhan Manjhi	BJP	44413	8796
Mahasamund district
53	Saraipali	Trilochan Patel	BJP	49674	Devendra Bahdur Singh	INC	40942	8732
54	Basna	Trivikram Bhoi	BJP	29385	Mahendra Bahdur Singh	INC	26982	2403
55	Khallari	Preetam Singh Diwan	BJP	33701	Bhekhram Sahu	INC	28076	5625
56	Mahasamund	Poonam Chandrakar	BJP	41812	Agni Chandrakar	INC	40201	1611
Dhamtari district
57	Sihawa (ST)	Pinky Dhruw	BJP	47624	Madhav Singh Dhruw	INC	31559	16065
58	Kurud	Ajay Chandrakar	BJP	56247	Deepa Sahu	INC	53538	2709
59	Dhamtari	Inder Chopra	BJP	70494	Gurumukh Singh Hora	INC	56914	13580
Kanker district
60	Bhanupratappur (ST)	Deolal Dugga	BJP	40803	Manoj Singh Mandavi	INC	39424	1379
61	Kanker (ST)	Aghan Singh Thakur	BJP	50198	Shyama Dhruwa	INC	24387	25811
Bastar district
62	Narayanpur (ST)	Vikram Usendi	BJP	40504	Manturam Pawar	INC	31690	8814
63	Keshkal (ST)	Mahesh Baghel	BJP	44477	Phulo Devi Netam	INC	33195	11282
64	Kondagaon (ST)	Lata Usendi	BJP	42821	Shankar Sodhi	INC	28700	14121
65	Bhanpuri (ST)	Kedar Nath Kashyap	BJP	41023	Anturam Kashyap	INC	29631	11392
66	Jagdalpur (ST)	Subhau Kashyap	BJP	60327	Jhituram Baghel	INC	30038	30289
67	Keslur (ST)	Baiduram Kashyap	BJP	39222	Mannuram Kachcha	INC	15164	24058
68	Chitrakot (ST)	Lachhuram Kashyap	BJP	18763	Pratibha Shah	INC	15304	3459
Dantewada district
69	Dantewada (ST)	Mahendra Karma	INC	24572	Nand Ram Sori	CPI	19637	4935
70	Konta (ST)	Kawasi Lakhma	INC	32067	Manish Kunjam	CPI	14669	17398
71	Bijapur (ST)	Rajendra Pambhoi	INC	15917	Rajaram Todam	BJP	13196	2721
Durg district
72	Maro (SC)	Dayaldas Baghel	BJP	45279	Dheeru Prasad Ghritlahare	INC	33620	11659
73	Bemetara	Chetan Verma	INC	39830	Sharda Mahesh Tiwari	BJP	27588	12242
74	Saja	Ravindra Choubey	INC	58573	Deepak Sahu	BJP	40831	17742
75	Dhamdha	Tamradhwaj Sahu	INC	48661	Jageshwar Sahu	BJP	39334	9327
76	Durg	Hemchand Yadav	BJP	107484	Arun Vora	INC	84911	22573
77	Bhilai	Prem Prakash Pandey	BJP	75749	Badruddin Quraishi	INC	60745	15004
78	Patan	Bhupesh Baghel	INC	44217	Vijay Baghel	NCP	37308	6909
79	Gunderdehi	Ramshila Sahu	BJP	40813	Ghanaram Sahu	INC	31523	9290
80	Khertha	Balmukund Dewagan	BJP	52734	Pratima Chandrakar	INC	40182	12552
81	Balod	Pritam Sahu	BJP	47204	Lokendra Yadav	INC	34130	13074
82	Dondi Lohara (ST)	Lal Mahendra Singh Tekam	BJP	46147	Domendra Bhendiya	INC	35404	10743
Rajnandgaon district
83	Chowki (ST)	Sanjeev Shah	BJP	37802	Shivraj Singh Usare	INC	36267	1535
84	Khujji	Rajinder Pal Singh Bhatia	BJP	45409	Bholaram	INC	44296	1113
85	Dongargaon	Pradeep Gandhi	BJP	42784	Geeta Devi Singh	INC	36649	6135
86	Rajnandgaon	Uday Mudliyar	INC	43081	Lilaram Bhojwani	BJP	43041	40
87	Dongargarh (SC)	Vinod Khandekar	BJP	55188	Dhanesh Patila	INC	40711	14477
88	Khairagarh	Devwrat Singh	INC	46339	Siddharth Singh	BJP	28432	17907
Kawardha district
89	Birendranagar	Mohammad Akbar	INC	54828	Santosh Pandey	BJP	42846	11982
90	Kawardha	Yogeshwar Raj Singh	INC	51092	Siyaram Sahu	BJP	46904	4188
