= 2008 Chhattisgarh Legislative Assembly election =

Legislative Assembly election in Chhattisgarh, India

- 14 to 20 November 2008

All 90 seats to the Legislative Assembly 46 seats needed for a majority
- Turnout: 70.66% (▼0.64%)
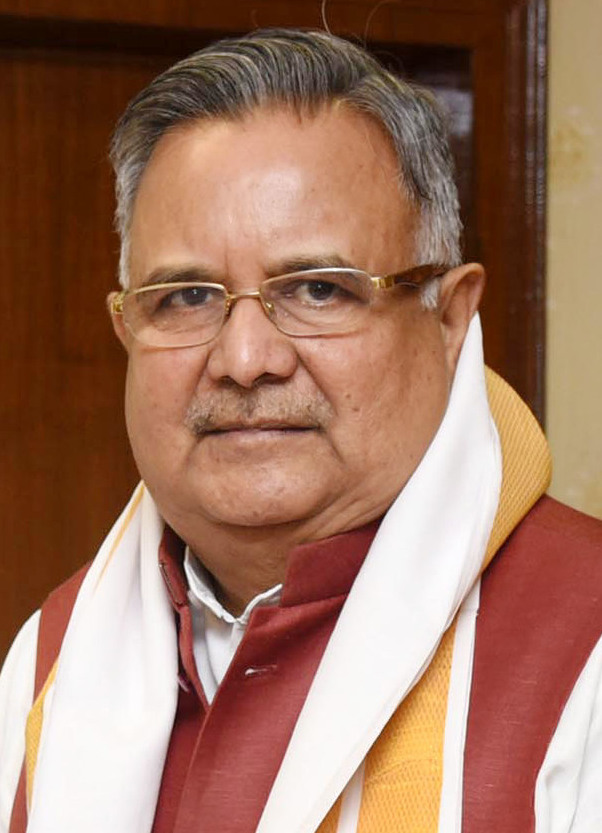

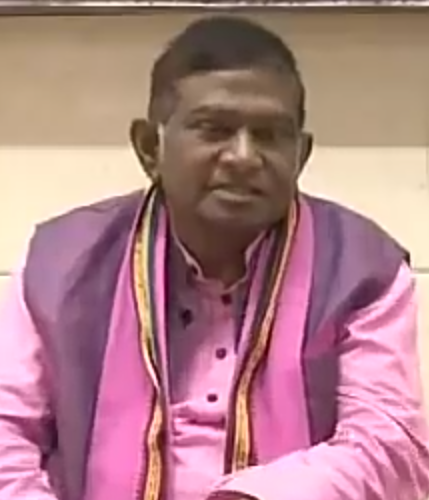

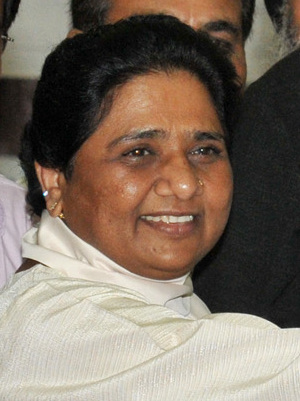
	First party	Second party	Third party
Leader	Raman Singh	Ajit Jogi	Mayawati
Party	BJP	INC	BSP
Leader since	2003	1999	2003
Leader's seat	Rajnandgaon	Marwahi
Last election	50	37	2
Seats won	50	38	2
Seat change	Steady	▲1	Steady
Percentage	40.33%	38.63%	6.11%
Swing	▲1.07%	▲1.92%	▲1.66%
- Seatwise map of the election results

- Structure of the Chhattisgarh Legislative Assembly after the election
CM before election
Raman Singh
BJP
Elected CM
Raman Singh
BJP

The Chhattisgarh Legislative Assembly election, 2008 was held on 14 and 20 November 2008, to select the 90 members of the Chhattisgarh Legislative Assembly. The results of the election were announced on 8 December. The Bharatiya Janata Party won the popular vote and a majority of seats and the incumbent Chief Minister Raman Singh was sworn in as Chief minister for his second term.

== Results ==
=== Party-wise ===
Party	Votes	%	Seats	+/–
Bharatiya Janata Party	4,332,834	40.35	50	0
Indian National Congress	4,146,853	38.62	38	▲1
Bahujan Samaj Party	656,041	6.11	2	0
Nationalist Congress Party	56,293	0.52	0	▼1
Others	635,584	5.92	0	0
Independents	909,686	8.47	0	0
Total	10,737,291	100.00	90	0
Valid votes	10,737,291	99.93		
Invalid/blank votes	7,896	0.07		
Total votes	10,745,187	100.00		
Registered voters/turnout	15,218,560	70.61		
Source: ECI

=== Region-wise ===
Region	Seats			
Region	Seats	BJP	INC	BSP
Surguja	14	9	5	—N/a
Central Chhattisgarh	64	30	32	2
Bastar	12	11	1	—N/a
Total	90	50	37	3

=== District-wise ===
District	Seats			
District	Seats	BJP	INC	BSP
Koriya	3	3	—N/a	—N/a
Surguja	8	4	4	—N/a
Jashpur	3	2	1	—N/a
Raigarh	5	1	4	—N/a
Korba	4	1	3	—N/a
Bilaspur	9	6	3	—N/a
Janjgir-Champa	6	2	2	2
Mahasamund	4	—N/a	4	—N/a
Raipur	13	7	6	—N/a
Dhamtari	3	—N/a	3	—N/a
Durg	12	8	4	—N/a
Kawardha	2	1	1	—N/a
Rajnandgaon	6	4	2	—N/a
Kanker	3	3	—N/a	—N/a
Bastar	6	6	—N/a	—N/a
Dantewada	3	2	1	—N/a
Total	90	50	38	2

== Constituency-wise Result ==
Constituency		Winner			Runner Up			Margin
#	Name	Candidate	Party	Votes	Candidate	Party	Votes	Margin
Koriya district
1	Bharatpur-Sonhat (ST)	Phoolchand Singh	BJP	35443	Gulab Singh	INC	28145	7298
2	Manendragarh	Deepak Kumar Patel	BJP	30912	Ramanuj	NCP	16630	14282
3	Baikunthpur	Bhaiyalal Rajwade	BJP	36215	Bedanti Tiwari	INC	30679	5536
Surguja district
4	Premnagar	Renuka Singh	BJP	56652	Naresh Kumar Rajwade	INC	40543	16109
5	Bhatgaon	Ravi Shankar Tripathi	BJP	35943	Shyamlal Jaiswal	INC	18510	17433
6	Pratappur (ST)	Prem Sai Singh Tekam	INC	54108	Ram Sewak Paikra	BJP	49863	4245
7	Ramanujganj (ST)	Ramvichar Netam	BJP	54562	Brihaspat Singh	INC	50352	4210
8	Samri (ST)	Siddha Nath Paikra	BJP	31878	Chintamani Maharaj	Ind	19474	30498
9	Lundra (ST)	Ramdev Ram	INC	51558	Kamalbhan Singh Marabi	BJP	43384	8174
10	Ambikapur	T. S. Singh Deo	INC	56043	Anurag Singh Deo	BJP	55063	980
11	Sitapur (ST)	Amarjeet Bhagat	INC	36281	Ganesh Ram Bhagat	BJP	34544	1737
Jashpur district
12	Jashpur (ST)	Jageshwar Ram Bhagat	BJP	64553	Vinay Bhagat	INC	48783	15770
13	Kunkuri (ST)	Bharat Sai	BJP	57113	Uttamdan Minj	INC	47521	9592
14	Pathalgaon (ST)	Rampukar Singh Thakur	INC	64543	Vishnudeo Sai	BJP	54627	9916
Raigarh district
15	Lailunga (ST)	Hriday Ram Rathiya	INC	62107	Satyanand Rathia	BJP	48026	14081
16	Raigarh	Shakrajeet Nayak	INC	72054	Vijay Agrawal	BJP	59110	12944
17	Sarangarh (SC)	Padma Mahnar	INC	61659	Shamsher Singh	BJP	50814	10845
18	Kharsia	Nand Kumar Patel	INC	81497	Laxmi Devi Patel	BJP	48069	33428
19	Dharamjaigarh (ST)	Om Prakash Rathia	BJP	52435	Chanesh Ram Rathiya	INC	49068	3367
Korba district
20	Rampur (ST)	Nanki Ram Kanwar	BJP	58415	Pyarelal Kanwar	INC	50094	8321
21	Korba	Jai Singh Agrawal	INC	48277	Banwari Lal Agrawal	BJP	47690	587
22	Katghora	Bodhram Kanwar	INC	79049	Jyotinand Dubey	BJP	31963	6966
23	Pali-Tanakhar (ST)	Ram Dayal Uike	INC	56676	Hira Singh Markam	GGP	27233	29443
Bilaspur district
24	Marwahi (ST)	Ajit Jogi	INC	67523	Dhyan Singh Porte	BJP	25431	42092
25	Kota	Renu Jogi	INC	55317	Moolchand Khandelwal	BJP	45506	9811
26	Lormi	Dharmjeet Singh Thakur	INC	48569	Jawahar Sahu	BJP	43580	4989
27	Mungeli (SC)	Punnulal Mohle	BJP	52074	Churawan Mangeshkar	INC	41749	10325
28	Takhatpur	Raju Singh	BJP	43431	Balram Singh	INC	37838	5593
29	Bilha	Dharamlal Kaushik	BJP	62517	Siyaram Kaushik	INC	56447	6070
30	Bilaspur	Amar Agrawal	BJP	60784	Anil Kumar Tah	INC	51408	9376
31	Beltara	Badridhar Diwan	BJP	38867	Bhuvneshwar Yadav	INC	33891	4976
32	Masturi (SC)	Krishnamurti Bandhi	BJP	54002	Madan Singh Dharia	INC	44794	9208
Janjgir–Champa district
33	Akaltara	Saurabh Singh	BSP	37393	Chunnilal Sahu	INC	34505	2888
34	Janjgir-Champa	Narayan Chandel	BJP	42006	Motilal Dewangan	INC	40816	1190
35	Sakti	Saroja Manharan Rathore	INC	47368	Megharam Sahu	BJP	37976	9392
36	Chandrapur	Yudhvir Singh Judev	BJP	48843	Nobel Kumar Verma	NCP	31553	17290
37	Jaijaipur	Mahant Ramsunder Das	INC	43346	Keshav Prasad Chandra	BSP	33907	9439
38	Pamgarh (SC)	Dujaram Bouddh	BSP	39534	Ambesh Jangde	BJP	33579	5955
Mahasamund district
39	Saraipali (SC)	Haridas Bharadwaj	INC	64456	Nira Chauhan	BJP	48234	16222
40	Basna	Devendra Bahadur Singh	INC	52145	Premshankar Patel	BJP	36238	15907
41	Khallari	Paresh Bagbahara	INC	66074	Preetam Singh Diwan	BJP	43569	22505
42	Mahasamund	Agni Chandrakar	INC	52667	Motilal Sahu	BJP	47623	5044
Raipur district
43	Bilaigarh (SC)	Shiv Kumar Dahria	INC	55863	Sangam Jangade	BJP	42241	13622
44	Kasdol	Rajkamal Singhania	INC	77661	Yogesh Chandrakar	BJP	50455	27206
45	Baloda Bazar	Laxmi Baghel	BJP	56788	Ganesh Shankar Bajpai	INC	51606	5182
46	Bhatapara	Chaitram Sahu	INC	58242	Shivratan Sharma	BJP	52010	6232
47	Dharsiwa	Devjibhai Patel	BJP	51396	Chhatrapal Sirmour	INC	45057	6339
48	Raipur Rural	Nand Kumar Sahu	BJP	46535	Satyanarayan Sharma	INC	43556	2979
49	Raipur City West	Rajesh Munat	BJP	51391	Santosh Agrawal	INC	36546	14845
50	Raipur City North	Kuldeep Juneja	INC	46982	Sachhidanand Upasane	BJP	45546	1436
51	Raipur City South	Brijmohan Agrawal	BJP	65686	Yogesh Tiwari	INC	40747	24939
52	Arang (SC)	Guru Rudra Kumar	INC	34655	Sanjay Dhidhi	BJP	33318	1337
53	Abhanpur	Chandra Shekhar Sahu	BJP	56249	Dhanendra Sahu	INC	54759	1490
54	Rajim	Amitesh Shukla	INC	55803	Santosh Upadhyay	BJP	51887	3916
55	Bindrawagarh (ST)	Damrudhar Pujari	BJP	67505	Omkar Shah	INC	50801	16704
Dhamtari district
56	Sihawa (ST)	Ambika Markam	INC	56048	Pinky Shivraj Shah	BJP	41152	14896
57	Kurud	Lekhram Sahu	INC	64299	Ajay Chandrakar	BJP	58094	6205
58	Dhamtari	Gurumukh Singh Hora	INC	76746	Vipin Kumar Sahu	BJP	49739	27007
Durg district
59	Sanjari-Balod	Madanlal Sahu	BJP	56620	Mohan Patel	INC	49984	6636
60	Dondi Lohara (ST)	Neelima Singh Tekam	BJP	41534	Anita Kumeti	INC	37547	3987
61	Gunderdehi	Virendra Sahu	BJP	64010	Ghanaram Sahu	INC	61425	2585
62	Patan	Vijay Baghel	BJP	59000	Bhupesh Baghel	INC	51158	7842
63	Durg Gramin	Pratima Chandrakar	INC	49710	Preetpal Belchandan	BJP	48153	1557
64	Durg City	Hemchand Yadav	BJP	53803	Arun Vora	INC	53101	702
65	Bhilai Nagar	Badruddin Quraishi	INC	52848	Premprakash Pandey	BJP	43985	8863
66	Vaishali Nagar	Saroj Pandey	BJP	63078	Brij Mohan Singh	INC	41811	21267
67	Ahiwara (SC)	Domanlal Korsewada	BJP	57795	Oni Kumar Mahilang	INC	45144	12651
68	Saja	Ravindra Choubey	INC	63775	Labhchand Bafna	BJP	58720	5055
69	Bemetara	Tamradhwaj Sahu	INC	57082	Awadhesh Singh Chandel	BJP	50609	6473
70	Navagarh (SC)	Dayaldas Baghel	BJP	53519	Dheeru Prasad Ghritlahare	INC	47012	6507
Kawardha district
71	Pandariya	Mohammad Akbar	INC	72397	Lalji Chandravanshi	BJP	70536	1861
72	Kawardha	Siyaram Sahu	BJP	78817	Yogeshwar Raj Singh	INC	68409	10408
Rajnandgaon district
73	Khairagarh	Komal Janghel	BJP	62437	Motilal Janghel	INC	42893	19544
74	Dongargarh (SC)	Ramji Bharti	BJP	57315	Dinesh Patila	INC	49900	7415
75	Rajnandgaon	Raman Singh	BJP	77230	Uday Mudliyar	INC	44841	32389
76	Dongargaon	Kheduram Sahu	BJP	61344	Geeta Devi Singh	INC	51937	9407
77	Khujji	Bholaram Sahu	INC	57594	Jamnuadevi Thakur	BJP	41475	16119
78	Mohla-Manpur (ST)	Shivraj Singh Usare	INC	43890	Darbar Singh Manda	BJP	37449	6441
Kanker district
79	Antagarh (ST)	Vikram Usendi	BJP	37255	Manturam Pawar	INC	37146	109
80	Bhanupratappur (ST)	Brahmanand Netam	BJP	41384	Manoj Singh Mandavi	Ind	25905	15479
81	Kanker (ST)	Sumitra Markole	BJP	46793	Preeti Netam	INC	29290	17503
Bastar district
82	Keshkal (ST)	Sewakram Netam	BJP	46006	Dhannu Markam	INC	37392	8614
83	Kondagaon (ST)	Lata Usendi	BJP	44691	Mohan Markam	INC	41920	2771
84	Narayanpur (ST)	Kedar Nath Kashyap	BJP	48459	Rajnuram Netam	INC	26824	21635
85	Bastar (ST)	Subhau Kashyap	BJP	39991	Lakeshwar Baghel	INC	38790	1201
86	Jagdalpur	Santosh Bafna	BJP	55003	Rekchand Jain	INC	37479	17524
87	Chitrakot (ST)	Baiduram Kashyap	BJP	31642	Pratibha Shah	INC	22411	9231
Dantewada district
88	Dantewada (ST)	Bhima Mandavi	BJP	36813	Manish Kunjam	CPI	24805	12008
89	Bijapur (ST)	Mahesh Gagda	BJP	20049	Rajendra Pambhoi	INC	9528	10521
90	Konta (ST)	Kawasi Lakhma	INC	21630	Padam Nanda	BJP	21438	192
