= List of constituencies of the Chhattisgarh Legislative Assembly =

Chhattisgarh Legislative Assembly
- 6th Chhattisgarh Assembly

Type
- Type: Unicameral
- Term limits: 5 years
- Seats: 90

Elections
- Voting system: First past the post
- Last election: 2023

Meeting place
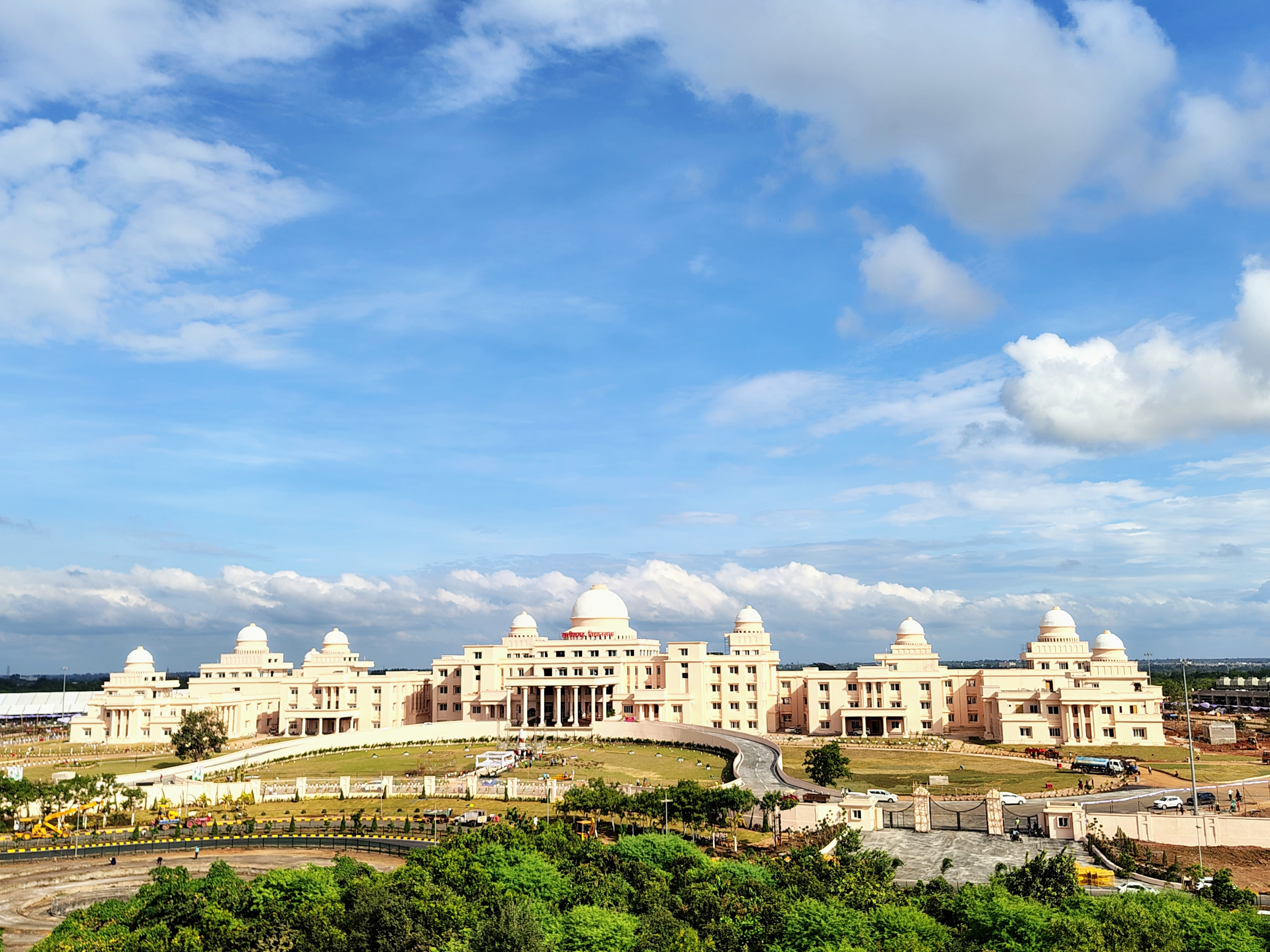
- Vidhan Sabha Bhavan, Raipur, Chhattisgarh

Website
- cgvidhansabha.gov.in

Location of Chhattisgarh (highlighted in red) within India

The Chhattisgarh Legislative Assembly is the unicameral legislature of the state of Chhattisgarh in central India. It is housed in the Vidhan Sabha Bhavan building located in Atal Nagar, near Raipur, the capital of the state. The term of the assembly is five years, unless it is dissolved early. (Note: A legislative assembly can be dissolved early, under Article 174 of the Indian Constitution, in a few situations including a hung assembly and the inability of any alliance to form a majority.) Chhattisgarh is the ninth-largest state in India, covering 135,191 km^{2} (52,198 sq mi); and the seventeenth-most populous state with a population of 25.5 million. The Chhattisgarh Legislative Assembly has had six terms since its creation. After the latest election in 2023, the assembly is governed by the Bharatiya Janata Party which won 54 out of the 90 seats. The Indian National Congress, the largest opposition party, has 35 seats.

Constituency boundaries are periodically redrawn by the delimitation commission which tries to keep them as geographically compact areas, and with due consideration to existing boundaries of administrative units. The latest census is used to draw the boundaries and every assembly constituency has to be completely within a parliamentary constituency. Since 2000, the Chhattisgarh Assembly has had 90 single-seat constituencies, each of which directly elects a representative based on a first past the post election.

Since the independence of India from the United Kingdom in 1947, the Scheduled Castes (SC) and Scheduled Tribes (ST) have been given reservation status, guaranteeing political representation, and the Constitution lays down the general principles of positive discrimination for SCs and STs. According to the 2011 census of India the Scheduled Castes constitute 12.8% of the population of the state, while the Scheduled Tribes constitute 30.6%. The Scheduled Castes have been granted a reservation of 10 seats in the assembly, while 29 constituencies are reserved for candidates of the Scheduled Tribes.

== History ==
Changes in the constituencies of the Chhattisgarh Legislative Assembly
Year	Act/Order	Explanation	Total seats	SC-reserved seats	ST-reserved seats	Election(s)
2000	Madhya Pradesh Reorganisation Act, 2000	Chhattisgarh was created out of the eastern parts of Madhya Pradesh.	90	10	34	2003
2008	Delimitation Commission Order, 2008	There were changes in the reservation status and area covered by constituencies.	90	10	29	2008, 2013, 2018, 2023

== Constituencies ==
Map of assembly constituencies of Chhattisgarh

Reservation
Scheduled Castes
Scheduled Tribes

Constituencies of the Chhattisgarh Legislative Assembly
No.	Name	Reservation	District	Lok Sabha constituency	Electorate (2023)
1	Bharatpur-Sonhat	ST	Manendragarh-Chirmiri-Bharatpur	Korba	176,696
2	Manendragarh	None	Manendragarh-Chirmiri-Bharatpur	Korba	134,947
3	Baikunthpur	None	Koriya	Korba	168,185
4	Premnagar	None	Surajpur	Surguja	237,134
5	Bhatgaon	None	Surajpur	Surguja	236,803
6	Pratappur	ST	Balrampur	Surguja	231,709
7	Ramanujganj	ST	Balrampur	Surguja	218,543
8	Samri	ST	Balrampur	Surguja	218,557
9	Lundra	ST	Surguja	Surguja	193,902
10	Ambikapur	None	Surguja	Surguja	256,691
11	Sitapur	ST	Surguja	Surguja	201,660
12	Jashpur	ST	Jashpur	Raigarh	237,786
13	Kunkuri	ST	Jashpur	Raigarh	205,625
14	Pathalgaon	ST	Jashpur	Raigarh	226,859
15	Lailunga	ST	Raigarh	Raigarh	204,520
16	Raigarh	None	Raigarh	Raigarh	257,432
17	Sarangarh	SC	Raigarh	Raigarh	263,526
18	Kharsia	None	Raigarh	Raigarh	215,550
19	Dharamjaigarh	ST	Raigarh	Raigarh	212,825
20	Rampur	ST	Korba	Korba	221,232
21	Korba	None	Korba	Korba	256,051
22	Katghora	None	Korba	Korba	214,882
23	Pali-Tanakhar	ST	Korba	Korba	228,459
24	Marwahi	ST	Gaurela-Pendra-Marwahi	Korba	197,952
25	Kota	None	Gaurela-Pendra-Marwahi	Bilaspur	219,070
26	Lormi	None	Mungeli	Bilaspur	228,487
27	Mungeli	SC	Mungeli	Bilaspur	253,778
28	Takhatpur	None	Bilaspur	Bilaspur	243,812
29	Bilha	None	Bilaspur	Bilaspur	306,473
30	Bilaspur	None	Bilaspur	Bilaspur	251,210
31	Beltara	None	Bilaspur	Bilaspur	248,729
32	Masturi	SC	Bilaspur	Bilaspur	305,620
33	Akaltara	None	Janjgir–Champa	Janjgir–Champa	222,283
34	Janjgir-Champa	None	Janjgir–Champa	Janjgir–Champa	212,602
35	Sakti	None	Janjgir–Champa	Janjgir–Champa	214,392
36	Chandrapur	None	Janjgir–Champa	Janjgir–Champa	234,099
37	Jaijaipur	None	Janjgir–Champa	Janjgir–Champa	249,202
38	Pamgarh	SC	Janjgir–Champa	Janjgir–Champa	220,500
39	Saraipali	SC	Mahasamund	Mahasamund	205,107
40	Basna	None	Mahasamund	Mahasamund	224,581
41	Khallari	None	Mahasamund	Mahasamund	217,389
42	Mahasamund	None	Mahasamund	Mahasamund	208,801
43	Bilaigarh	SC	Baloda Bazar	Janjgir–Champa	301,885
44	Kasdol	None	Baloda Bazar	Janjgir–Champa	361,750
45	Baloda Bazar	None	Baloda Bazar	Raipur	280,782
46	Bhatapara	None	Baloda Bazar	Raipur	252,829
47	Dharsiwa	None	Raipur	Raipur	234,726
48	Raipur City Gramin	None	Raipur	Raipur	349,371
49	Raipur City West	None	Raipur	Raipur	291,591
50	Raipur City North	None	Raipur	Raipur	202,204
51	Raipur City South	None	Raipur	Raipur	260,006
52	Arang	SC	Raipur	Raipur	231,375
53	Abhanpur	None	Raipur	Raipur	214,002
54	Rajim	None	Gariaband	Mahasamund	228,453
55	Bindranawagarh	ST	Gariaband	Mahasamund	226,593
56	Sihawa	ST	Dhamtari	Kanker	193,736
57	Kurud	None	Dhamtari	Mahasamund	208,888
58	Dhamtari	None	Dhamtari	Mahasamund	220,402
59	Sanjari Balod	None	Balod	Kanker	225,116
60	Dondi Lohara	ST	Balod	Kanker	221,829
61	Gunderdehi	None	Balod	Kanker	244,682
62	Patan	None	Durg	Durg	217,319
63	Durg Gramin	None	Durg	Durg	220,704
64	Durg City	None	Durg	Durg	227,843
65	Bhilai Nagar	None	Durg	Durg	169,013
66	Vaishali Nagar	None	Durg	Durg	251,284
67	Ahiwara	SC	Durg	Durg	244,787
68	Saja	None	Bemetara	Durg	250,817
69	Bemetara	None	Bemetara	Durg	247,204
70	Navagarh	SC	Bemetara	Durg	266,759
71	Pandariya	None	Kabirdham	Rajnandgaon	316,340
72	Kawardha	None	Kabirdham	Rajnandgaon	331,671
73	Khairagarh	None	Rajnandgaon	Rajnandgaon	219,825
74	Dongargarh	SC	Rajnandgaon	Rajnandgaon	209,950
75	Rajnandgaon	None	Rajnandgaon	Rajnandgaon	211,705
76	Dongargaon	None	Rajnandgaon	Rajnandgaon	203,009
77	Khujji	None	Rajnandgaon	Rajnandgaon	191,582
78	Mohla-Manpur	ST	Rajnandgaon	Rajnandgaon	168,008
79	Antagarh	ST	Kanker	Kanker	176,261
80	Bhanupratappur	ST	Kanker	Kanker	203,467
81	Kanker	ST	Kanker	Kanker	182,944
82	Keshkal	ST	Kondagaon	Kanker	207,062
83	Kondagaon	ST	Kondagaon	Bastar	189,137
84	Narayanpur	ST	Narayanpur	Bastar	191,290
85	Bastar	ST	Bastar	Bastar	167,919
86	Jagdalpur	None	Bastar	Bastar	206,226
87	Chitrakot	ST	Bastar	Bastar	177,625
88	Dantewara	ST	Dantewada	Bastar	192,806
89	Bijapur	ST	Bijapur	Bastar	169,457
90	Konta	ST	Sukma	Bastar	166,912

== See also ==
- List of Lok Sabha constituencies in Chhattisgarh
- List of constituencies of the Madhya Pradesh Legislative Assembly
