= Baleshwar Sahu =

Indian politician

Member of Chhattisgarh Legislative Assembly
- Incumbent
- Assumed office 2023
- Preceded by: Keshaw Prasad Chandra
- Constituency: Jaijaipur

Personal details
- Party: Indian National Congress
- Profession: Politician

Baleshwar Sahu (born 1988) is an Indian politician from Chhattisgarh. He is an MLA from Jaijaipur Assembly constituency in Sakti district. He won the 2023 Chhattisgarh Legislative Assembly election, representing the Indian National Congress.

== Early life and education ==
Sahu is from Jaijaipur, Sakti district, Chhattisgarh. He is the son of Teras Ram Sahu. He completed his M.Sc. in 2016 at Dr CV Raman University, Bilaspur.

== Career ==
Sahu won from Jaijaipur Assembly constituency representing the Indian National Congress in the 2023 Chhattisgarh Legislative Assembly election. He polled 76,747 votes and defeated his nearest rival, Krishna Kant Chandra of the Bharatiya Janata Party, by a margin of 25,922 votes. BJP has never won from Jaijaipur, a general assembly constituency, one among the nine constituencies, where the ruling BJP failed to establish a foothold.
