= Lormi Assembly constituency =

Legislative Assembly constituency in Chhattisgarh State, India

Coordinates: 22.27°N 81.7°E

Lormi
- Constituency No. 26 for the Chhattisgarh Legislative Assembly

Constituency details
- Country: India
- Region: Central India
- State: Chhattisgarh
- District: Mungeli
- Lok Sabha constituency: Bilaspur
- Established: 2003
- Total electors: 228,487
- Reservation: None

Member of Legislative Assembly
- 6th Chhattisgarh Legislative Assembly
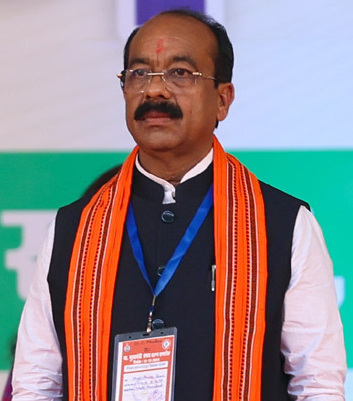
- Incumbent Arun Sao
- Party: Bharatiya Janata Party
- Elected year: 2023
- Preceded by: Dharmjeet Singh Thakur

Lormi is one of the 90 Legislative Assembly constituencies of Chhattisgarh state in India.

It is part of Mungeli district.

== Members of the Legislative Assembly ==
Election	Name	Party
Madhya Pradesh Legislative Assembly
1957	Gangaprasad	Akhil Bharatiya Ram Rajya Parishad
1962	Yeshwantraj Singh	Akhil Bharatiya Ram Rajya Parishad
1967	Rajendra Prasad Shukla	Indian National Congress
1972	Sheo Prasad Gotia	Indian National Congress
1977	Phool Chand Jain	Janata Party
1980	Baijnath Chandra Kar	Indian National Congress
1985	Bhupendra Singh	Bharatiya Janata Party
1990	Niranjan Kesharvani	Bharatiya Janata Party
1993	Muniram Sahu	Bharatiya Janata Party
1998	Dharmjeet Singh Thakur	Indian National Congress
Chhattisgarh Legislative Assembly
2003	Dharmjeet Singh Thakur	Indian National Congress
2008	Dharmjeet Singh Thakur	Indian National Congress
2013	Tokhan Sahu	Bharatiya Janata Party
2018	Dharmjeet Singh Thakur	Janta Congress Chhattisgarh
2023	Arun Sao	Bharatiya Janata Party

== Election results ==
=== 2023 ===
2023 Chhattisgarh Legislative Assembly election: Lormi
Party	Candidate	Votes	%	±%
BJP	Arun Sao	75,070	47.80	▲18.24
INC	Thaneshvar Sahu	29,179	18.58	▲6.9
Independent	Sanjeet Burman	25,126	16.00	New
JCC	Sagar Singh Bais	15,910	10.13	▼37.33
NOTA	None of the Above	814	0.52	▼0.28
Majority		45,891	29.22	▼11.32
Turnout		1,57,052	68.74	▼3.59
BJP gain from JCC		Swing		

=== 2018 ===
Chhattisgarh Legislative Assembly Election, 2018: Lormi
Party	Candidate	Votes	%	±%
JCC	Dharmjeet Singh Thakur	67,742	47.46	
BJP	Tokhan Sahu	42,189	29.56	
INC	Shatruhan Chandrakar	16,669	11.68	
Independent	Lalit Sahu	3,706	2.60	
Independent	Sanat Kumar Sahu	2526	1.77	
Independent	Tirith Ram	1,719	1.20	
NOTA	None of the Above	1,143	0.80	
Majority		25,553	17.90	
Turnout		142,744	72.33	
JCC gain from BJP		Swing		

== See also ==
- List of constituencies of the Chhattisgarh Legislative Assembly
- Mungeli district
