= Pandariya Assembly constituency =

Legislative Assembly constituency in Chhattisgarh State, India

Coordinates: 22.22°N 81.41°E

Pandariya
- Constituency No. 71 for the Chhattisgarh Legislative Assembly

Constituency details
- Country: India
- Region: Central India
- State: Chhattisgarh
- District: Kabirdham
- Lok Sabha constituency: Rajnandgaon
- Established: 2008
- Total electors: 316,340
- Reservation: None

Member of Legislative Assembly
- 6th Chhattisgarh Legislative Assembly
- Incumbent Bhawna Bohra
- Party: Bharatiya Janata Party
- Elected year: 2023
- Preceded by: Mamta Chandrakar

Pandariya is one of the 90 Legislative Assembly constituencies of Chhattisgarh state in India.

It comprises Pandariya tehsil, and parts of Kawardha tehsil, both in Kabirdham district. As of 2023, it is represented by Bhawna Bohra of the Bharatiya Janata Party.

== Members of the Legislative Assembly ==
Year	Member	Party
Until 2008: Constituency did not exist
2008	Mohammad Akbar	Indian National Congress
2013	Moti Ram Chandravanshi	Bharatiya Janata Party
2018	Mamta Chandrakar	Indian National Congress
2023	Bhawna Bohra	Bharatiya Janata Party

== Election results ==
=== 2023 ===
2023 Chhattisgarh Legislative Assembly election: Pandariya
Party	Candidate	Votes	%	±%
BJP	Bhawna Bohra	120,847	50.66	+21.05
INC	Neelu Chandravanshi	94,449	39.59	−6.79
BSP	Chait Ram Raj	6,214	2.60	−12.82
JCC	Bhai Ravi Chandravanshi	4,783	2.01	
Independent	Sachchidanand Kaushik	2,414	1.01	
NOTA	None of the Above	2,167	0.91	−1.50
Majority		26,398	11.07	−5.70
Turnout		238,545	75.41	−2.43
BJP gain from INC		Swing		

=== 2018 ===
2018 Chhattisgarh Legislative Assembly election: Pandariya
Party	Candidate	Votes	%	±%
INC	Mamta Chandrakar	100,907	46.38	
BJP	Motiram Chandravanshi	64420	29.61	
BSP	Chaitram Raj	33547	15.42	
Independent	Harendra Kumar Dahire	2511	1.15	
Independent	Ramkumar Sinha	2450	1.13	
Independent	Reshamlal Patre	2266	1.04	
NOTA	None of the Above	5234	2.41	
Majority		36,487	16.77	
Turnout		217548	77.84	
INC gain from BJP		Swing		

== See also ==
- List of constituencies of the Chhattisgarh Legislative Assembly
- Kabirdham district
