= Rikesh Sen =

Indian politician

Rikesh Sen (born 1981) is an Indian politician from Chhattisgarh. He is an MLA from the Vaishali Nagar Assembly constituency in the Durg District. He won the 2023 Chhattisgarh Legislative Assembly election, representing the Bharatiya Janata Party.

== Early life and education ==
Rikesh Sen is from Vaishali Nagar, Durg District, Chhattisgarh. He is the son of Anand Sen. He passed Class 12 in 1997 at B.S.P. Higher Secondary School, Bhilai.

== Career ==
Rikesh Sen won from the Vaishali Nagar Assembly constituency, representing the Bharatiya Janata Party in the 2023 Chhattisgarh Legislative Assembly election. He polled 98,272 votes and defeated his nearest rival, Mukesh Chandrakar of the Indian National Congress, by a margin of 40,074 votes.
