= Bhawna Bohra =

Indian politician

Member of Chhattisgarh Legislative Assembly
- Incumbent
- Assumed office 3 December 2023
- Preceded by: Mamta Chandrakar
- Constituency: Pandariya

Personal details
- Born: 24 August 1982 (age 44) Ranveerpur, Kawardha district, Chhattisgarh, India
- Party: Bharatiya Janata Party
- Spouse: Manish Bohra
- Children: 2
- Occupation: Business, Agriculture

Bhawna Bohra (born 24 August 1982) is an Indian politician. She is member of Bharatiya Janata Party. She represents Pandariya in the legislative assembly of Chhattisgarh.
