= Vaishali Nagar Assembly constituency =

Legislative Assembly constituency in Chhattisgarh State, India

Coordinates: 21.22°N 81.35°E

Vaishali Nagar
- Constituency No. 66 for the Chhattisgarh Legislative Assembly

Constituency details
- Country: India
- Region: Central India
- State: Chhattisgarh
- District: Durg
- Lok Sabha constituency: Durg
- Established: 2008
- Total electors: 251,284
- Reservation: None

Member of Legislative Assembly
- 6th Chhattisgarh Legislative Assembly
- Incumbent Rikesh Sen
- Party: Bharatiya Janata Party
- Elected year: 2023
- Preceded by: Vidya Ratan Bhasin

Vaishali Nagar is one of the 90 Legislative Assembly constituencies of Chhattisgarh state in India.

It comprises parts of Durg tehsil, in Durg district. As of 2023, its representative is Shri Rikesh Sen of the Bharatiya Janata Party.

== Members of the Legislative Assembly ==
Election	Name	Party
Prior to 2008: Constituency did not exist
2008	Saroj Pandey	Bharatiya Janata Party
2008	Bhajan Singh Nirankari	Indian National Congress
2013	Vidya Ratan Bhasin	Bharatiya Janta Party
2018	Vidya Ratan Bhasin	Bharatiya Janta Party
2023	Rikesh Sen	Bharatiya Janta Party

== Election results ==
=== 2023 ===
2023 Chhattisgarh Legislative Assembly election: Vaishali Nagar
Party	Candidate	Votes	%	±%
BJP	Rikesh Sen	98,272	59.45	+9.73
INC	Mukesh Chandrakar	58,198	35.21	−2.18
JCC	Yogesh Sahu	2,020	1.22	−6.07
BSP	Dinesh Kumar	1,670	1.01	
NOTA	None of the Above	892	0.54	−1.32
Majority		40,074	24.24	+11.91
Turnout		165,294	65.78	+0.05
BJP hold		Swing		

=== 2018 ===
Chhattisgarh Legislative Assembly Election, 2018: Vaishali Nagar
Party	Candidate	Votes	%	±%
BJP	Vidya Ratan Bhasin	72,920	49.72	
INC	Badruddin Qureshi	54,840	37.39	
JCC	Manoj Kumar	10,696	7.29	New
NOTA	None of the Above	2,724	1.86	
Majority		18,080	12.33	
Turnout		146,675	65.73	

== See also ==
- List of constituencies of the Chhattisgarh Legislative Assembly
- Durg district
