= Dharmjeet Singh Thakur =

Indian politician

Member of Chhattisgarh Legislative Assembly
- Incumbent
- Assumed office 3 December 2023
- Preceded by: Rashmi Ashish Singh
- Constituency: Takhatpur
- In office 11 December 2018 – 3 December 2023
- Preceded by: Tokhan Sahu
- Succeeded by: Arun Sao
- Constituency: Lormi
- In office 1998–2013
- Preceded by: Muniram Sahu
- Succeeded by: Tokhan Sahu
- Constituency: Lormi

Deputy speaker of Chhattisgarh legislative assembly
- In office 13 March 2003 – 5 December 2003
- Preceded by: Banwari Lal Agrawal
- Succeeded by: Badridhar Deewan

Personal details
- Born: Dharmjeet Singh Thakur; 30 June 1953 (age 72)
- Party: Bharatiya Janta Party (2023-present)
- Other political affiliations: Indian National Congress (till 2016); Janta Congress Chhattisgarh (2016-2023)
- Parent: Kalpnath Singh (father)
- Education: B.A.
- Alma mater: Government Graduate College, Bilaspur
- Profession: Agriculture

Dharmjeet Singh Thakur (born 30 June 1953) is an Indian politician. He is current MLA from Takhatpur assembly constituency. He was elected to the Chhattisgarh Legislative Assembly from Lormi in the 2018 Chhattisgarh Legislative Assembly election as a member of the Janta Congress Chhattisgarh.

== Political career ==
Singh Started his political career from student politics. Dharamjit Singh learned the art of politics from Vidya Charan Shukla. Vidya Charan Shukla has been his godfather. In 1998, he got Congress ticket for the first time from Lormi Assembly. And he defeated BJP's sitting MLA Muniram Sahu by 19000 votes. Along with becoming MLA for the first time, Dharamjit Singh also got the title of Excellent MLA. Later he also became the Deputy Speaker of the Assembly. He joined Janta Congress Chhattisgarh In 2016 and joined BJP in August 2023 before 2023 Chhattisgarh Legislative Assembly election. He is current MLA from Takhatpur.
