= Jaijaipur Assembly constituency =

Legislative Assembly constituency in Chhattisgarh State, India

Coordinates: 21.83°N 82.82°E

Jaijaipur
- Constituency No. 37 for the Chhattisgarh Legislative Assembly

Constituency details
- Country: India
- Region: Central India
- State: Chhattisgarh
- District: Janjgir-Champa
- Lok Sabha constituency: Janjgir-Champa
- Established: 2008
- Total electors: 249,202
- Reservation: None

Member of Legislative Assembly
- 6th Chhattisgarh Legislative Assembly
- Incumbent Baleshwar Sahu
- Party: Indian National Congress
- Elected year: 2023

Jaijaipur is one of the 90 Legislative Assembly constituencies of Chhattisgarh state in India.

It comprises Jaijaipur tehsil and parts of Champa tehsil and Malkhroda tehsil, all in Janjgir-Champa district.

== Members of the Legislative Assembly ==
Election	Name	Party
Before 2008: Constituency did not exist
2008	Mahant Ramsunder Das	Indian National Congress
2013	Keshav Prasad Chandra	Bahujan Samaj Party
2018	Keshav Prasad Chandra	Bahujan Samaj Party
2023	Baleshwar Sahu	Indian National Congress

== Election results ==
=== 2023 ===
Chhattisgarh Legislative Assembly Election, 2023: Jaijaipur
Party	Candidate	Votes	%	±%
INC	Baleshwar Sahu	76,747	44.04	+19.32
BJP	Krishna Kant Chandra	50,825	29.16	+1.56
BSP	Keshav Prasad Chandra	26,877	15.42	−26.07
Independent	Om Prakash Banjare	10,405	5.97	
JCC	Tekchand Chandra	3,330	1.91	
AAP	Durgalal Kewat	1,852	1.06	
NOTA	None of the Above	840	0.48	−0.50
Majority		25,922	14.88	+0.99
Turnout		174,274	69.93	+1.71
INC gain from BSP		Swing		

=== 2018 ===
Chhattisgarh Legislative Assembly Election, 2018: Jaijaipur
Party	Candidate	Votes	%	±%
BSP	Keshav Prasad Chandra	64,774	41.49	
BJP	Kailash Sahu	43,087	27.60	
INC	Anil Kumar Chandra	38,594	24.72	
NOTA	None of the Above	1527	0.98	
Majority		21,687	13.89	
Turnout		156,125	68.22	
BSP hold		Swing		

== See also ==
- List of constituencies of the Chhattisgarh Legislative Assembly
- Janjgir-Champa district
