= Kavita Pran Lahrey =

Indian politician

Member of the Chhattisgarh Legislative Assembly
- Incumbent
- Assumed office November 2023
- Preceded by: Chandradev Prasad Rai
- Constituency: Bilaigarh

Personal details
- Born: 1993 (age 32–33)
- Party: Indian National Congress
- Profession: Politician

Kavita Pran Lahrey (born 1993) is an Indian politician from Chhattisgarh. She is an MLA from Bilaigarh Assembly constituency, which is reserved for Scheduled Caste community, in Sarangarh-Bilaigarh district. She won the 2023 Chhattisgarh Legislative Assembly election representing the Indian National Congress.

== Early life and education ==
Kavita is from Bilaigarh, Sarangarh-Bilaigarh district, Chhattisgarh. She married Pran Prasad Lahrey, a government teacher. She completed her B.A. in 2020 at a college affiliated with Dr. C.V. Raman University, Kota Bilaspur.

== Career ==
Kavita won from Bilaigarh Assembly constituency representing Indian National Congress in the 2023 Chhattisgarh Legislative Assembly election. She polled 81,647 votes and defeated her nearest rival, Dineshlal Jagade of Bharatiya Janata Party, by a margin of 17,939 votes.
