= Dharamlal Kaushik =

Indian politician

Leader of the Opposition, Chhattisgarh Legislative Assembly
- In office 4 January 2019 – 17 August 2022
- Preceded by: T. S. Singh Deo, INC
- Succeeded by: Narayan Chandel, BJP

Member of Chhattisgarh Legislative Assembly for Bilha
- Incumbent
- Assumed office 12 December 2018
- Preceded by: Siyaram Kaushik, INC
- In office 2008–2013
- Preceded by: Siyaram Kaushik INC
- Succeeded by: Siyaram Kaushik INC
- In office 1998–2003
- Preceded by: Ashok Rao INC
- Succeeded by: Siyaram Kaushik INC

Speaker of the Chhattisgarh Legislative Assembly
- In office 5 January 2009 – 6 January 2014
- Preceded by: Prem Prakash Pandey, BJP
- Succeeded by: Gaurishankar Agrawal, BJP

President, Chhattisgarh BJP
- In office August 2014 – March 2019
- Preceded by: Vishnudeo Sai
- Succeeded by: Vikram Usendi

Personal details
- Born: 1 February 1958 (age 68) Bilaspur, Chhattisgarh, India
- Party: Bharatiya Janata Party
- Education: C.M. Dubey Postgraduate College, Bilaspur; Pt. Ravishankar Shukla University, Raipur
- Occupation: Politician

Dharamlal Kaushik (born 1 February 1958) is an Indian politician from the Bharatiya Janta Party and the 3rd speaker of Chhattisgarh Legislative Assembly from 2009 to 2014. On 4 January 2019, he was elected as the leader of opposition in Chhattisgarh Legislative Assembly after the BJP lost the legislative assembly election to the INC held in 2018. He also served as the state president of BJP's Chhattisgarh unit from 2014 till March 2019.

== Political career ==
Kaushik was first elected to Madhya Pradesh Legislative Assembly in 1998 from Bilha (Vidhan Sabha). After creation of Chhattisgarh from Madhya Pradesh state, Kaushik contested 2003 Chhattisgarh Legislative Assembly election but lost to Siyaram Kaushik of Indian National Congress. He was elected to Chhattisgarh Legislative Assembly in 2008 by defeating Indian National Congress candidate Siyaram Kaushik by a margin of 6,070 votes. Again, he lost 2013 Chhattisgarh Legislative Assembly election to his Congress rival Siyaram Kaushik. On 11 December 2018, he again won the election from same constituency and became Leader of the Opposition of Chhattisgarh Legislative Assembly.
