= Bilaigarh Assembly constituency =

Legislative Assembly constituency in Chhattisgarh State, India

Coordinates: 21.64°N 82.72°E

Bilaigarh
- Constituency No. 43 for the Chhattisgarh Legislative Assembly

Constituency details
- Country: India
- Region: Central India
- State: Chhattisgarh
- District: Baloda Bazar
- Lok Sabha constituency: Janjgir-Champa
- Established: 2003
- Total electors: 301,885
- Reservation: SC

Member of Legislative Assembly
- 6th Chhattisgarh Legislative Assembly
- Incumbent Kavita Pran Lahrey
- Party: Indian National Congress
- Elected year: 2023
- Preceded by: Chandradev Prasad Rai

Bilaigarh Legislative Assembly constituency is one of the 90 Legislative Assembly constituencies of Chhattisgarh state in India.

It comprises Bilaigarh tehsil and parts of Kasdol tehsil, in Baloda Bazar district, and is reserved for candidates belonging to the Scheduled Castes.

== Members of the Legislative Assembly ==
Election	Name	Party
Before 2008: Constituency did not exist
2008	Shivkumar Dahariya	Indian National Congress
2013	Sanam Jangre	Bharatiya Janata Party
2018	Chandradev Prasad Rai	Indian National Congress
2023	Kavita Pran Lahrey	Indian National Congress

== Election results ==
=== 2023 ===
Chhattisgarh Legislative Assembly Election, 2023: Basna
Party	Candidate	Votes	%	±%
INC	Kavita Pran Lahrey	81,647	37.92	+1.73
BJP	Dinesh Lal Jangdey	63,708	29.59	+9.15
BSP	Shyam Kumar Tandan	61,920	28.76	−2.48
NOTA	None of the Above	2,324	1.08	−0.32
Majority		17,939	8.33	+3.38
Turnout		215,333	71.33	−0.37
INC hold		Swing		

=== 2018 ===
Chhattisgarh Legislative Assembly Election, 2018: Bilaigarh
Party	Candidate	Votes	%	±%
INC	Chandradev Prasad Rai	71,936	36.19	
BSP	Shyam Kumar Tandan	62,089	31.24	
BJP	Sanam Jangade	40,623	20.44	
Independent	Bhoj Ram Ajagale	10,595	5.33	
Independent	Hari Ram Kurrey	2,580	1.30	
Independent	Sanjay Kumar	1,822	0.92	
NOTA	None of the Above	2,789	1.40	
Majority		9,847	4.95	
Turnout		198,769	71.70	
INC gain from BJP		Swing		

== See also ==
- List of constituencies of the Chhattisgarh Legislative Assembly
- Baloda Bazar district
