= Tokhan Sahu =

Indian politician (born 1969)

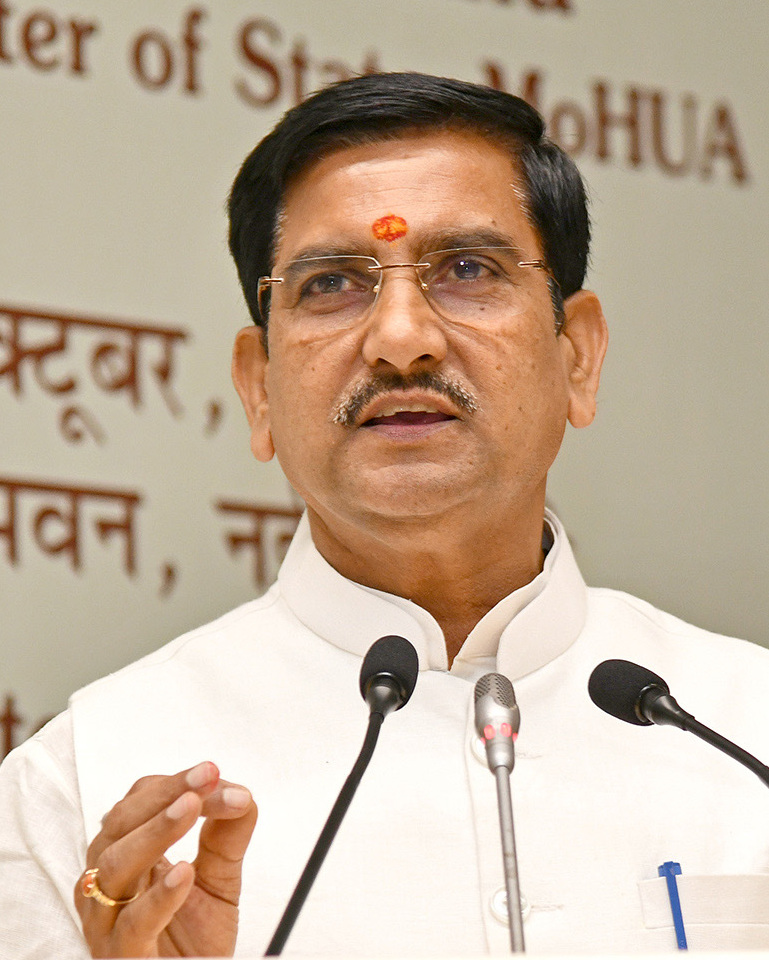

Minister of State in Ministry of Housing and Urban Affairs
- Incumbent
- Assumed office 11 June 2024
- Prime Minister: Narendra Modi
- Minister: Manohar Lal Khattar
- Preceded by: Kaushal Kishore

Member of Parliament
- Incumbent
- Assumed office 4 June 2024
- Preceded by: Arun Sao
- Constituency: Bilaspur

Member of Chhattisgarh Legislative Assembly
- In office 8 December 2013 – 11 December 2018
- Preceded by: Dharmjeet Singh
- Succeeded by: Dharmjeet Singh
- Constituency: Lormi

Personal details
- Born: Tokhan Sahu; 15 October 1969 (age 56) Dindori, Mungeli, Chhattisgarh
- Party: Bharatiya Janta Party
- Spouse: Smt. Lilawati Sahu
- Children: 2 (1 son, 1 daughter)
- Education: M.Com
- Occupation: Politician

Tokhan Sahu (born 15 October 1969) is an Indian politician and a member of parliament to the 18th Lok Sabha from Bilaspur. He is currently serving as Minister of State for Ministry of Housing and Urban Affairs. He was also a member of 4th legislative assembly of Chhattisgarh from Lormi.

== Political career ==
Sahu has been elected as a Member of Parliament from Bilaspur Lok Sabha constituency in the 2024 Indian general elections. He defeated Devendra Yadav of Indian National Congress by a margin of 164618 votes.

=== Minister in Third Modi ministry ===
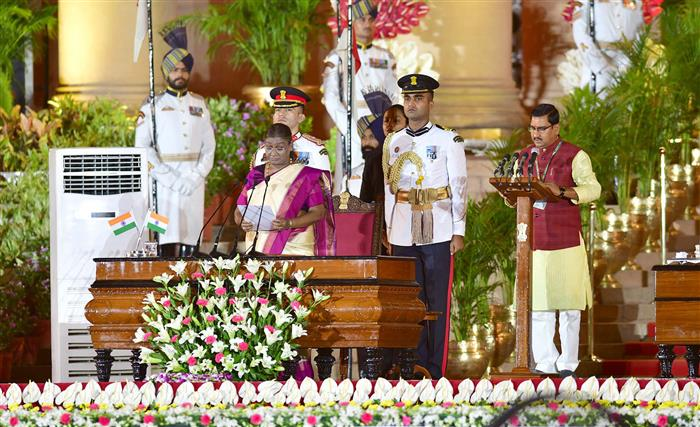
President of India Droupadi Murmu administering the oath as Minister of State in Ministry of Housing and Urban Affairs in third Narendra Modi ministry to Shri Tokhan Sahu at a Swearing-in Ceremony at Rashtrapati Bhavan, in New Delhi on June 09, 2024.

Lok Sabha
Preceded by Arun Sao	Member of Parliament for Bilaspur; 2024–present	Incumbent
Political offices
Preceded by Kaushal Kishore	Minister of Housing and Urban Affairs; 11 June 2024 – Present; Ministers of State	Incumbent
Preceded by Dharmjeet Singh Thakur	Member of the Legislative Assembly for Lormi; 2013–2018	Succeeded by Dharmjeet Singh Thakur
