= Beltara Assembly constituency =

Legislative Assembly constituency in Chhattisgarh State, India

Coordinates: 22.28°N 82.27°E

Beltara
- Constituency No. 31 for the Chhattisgarh Legislative Assembly

Constituency details
- Country: India
- Region: Central India
- State: Chhattisgarh
- District: Bilaspur
- Lok Sabha constituency: Bilaspur
- Established: 2008
- Total electors: 248,729
- Reservation: None

Member of Legislative Assembly
- 6th Chhattisgarh Legislative Assembly
- Incumbent Sushant Shukla
- Party: Bharatiya Janata Party
- Elected year: 2023

Beltara is one of the 90 Legislative Assembly constituencies of Chhattisgarh state in India. It is part of Bilaspur district. The constituency was created after the passing of the Delimitation of Parliamentary & Assembly Constituencies Order - 2008. It had its first election in 2008.

== Members of the Legislative Assembly ==
Year	Member	Party
Before 2008: Constituency did not exist
2008	Badridhar Deewan	Bharatiya Janata Party
2013	Badridhar Deewan	Bharatiya Janata Party
2018	Rajnish Kumar Singh	Bharatiya Janata Party
2023	Sushant Shukla	Bharatiya Janata Party

== Election results ==
=== 2023 ===
Chhattisgarh Legislative Assembly Election, 2023: Beltara
Party	Candidate	Votes	%	±%
BJP	Sushant Shukla	79,528	48.28	+13.79
INC	Rajendra Sahu	62,565	37.98	+7.84
BSP	Ramkumar Suryavanshi	15,118	9.18	
NOTA	None of the Above	587	0.36	−1.15
Majority		16,963	10.30	+5.95
Turnout		164,718	66.22	−1.80
BJP hold		Swing		

=== 2018 ===
Chhattisgarh Legislative Assembly Election, 2018: Beltara
Party	Candidate	Votes	%	±%
BJP	Rajnish Kumar Singh	49,601	34.49	
INC	Rajendra Sahu	43,342	30.14	
JCC	Anil Tah	38,308	26.64	
Independent	Sohit Yadav	2,576	1.79	
Akhil Bhartiya Sarvadharma Samaj Party	Shital Soni	1,663	1.16	
Independent	Sanjay Singh	1,458	1.01	
NOTA	None of the Above	2,176	1.51	
Majority		6,259	4.35	
Turnout		143,799	68.02	
BJP hold		Swing		

== See also ==
- List of constituencies of the Chhattisgarh Legislative Assembly
- Bilaspur district, Chhattisgarh
