= Narayan Chandel =

Indian politician

Leader of the Opposition, Chhattisgarh Legislative Assembly
- In office 18 August 2022 – 3 December 2023
- Chief Minister: Bhupesh Baghel
- Preceded by: Dharamlal Kaushik
- Succeeded by: Charan Das Mahant

Deputy Speaker of Chhattisgarh Legislative Assembly
- In office 2 August 2010 – 11 December 2013
- Speaker: Dharamlal Kaushik
- Preceded by: Badridhar Deewan
- Succeeded by: Badridhar Diwan

Member of Chhattisgarh Legislative Assembly
- In office 11 December 2018 – 3 December 2023
- Preceded by: Moti Lal Dewangan
- Succeeded by: Vyas Kashyap
- Constituency: Janjgir-Champa
- In office 2008–2013
- Preceded by: Moti Lal Dewangan
- Succeeded by: Moti Lal Dewangan
- Constituency: Janjgir-Champa

Member of Madhya Pradesh Legislative Assembly
- In office 1998–2003
- Preceded by: Charan Das Mahant
- Succeeded by: Moti Lal Dewangan
- Constituency: Champa

Personal details
- Born: 19 April 1965 (age 61) Janjgir, Madhya Pradesh, India (now in Chhattisgarh, India)
- Party: Bharatiya Janata Party
- Spouse: Pramila Chandel
- Children: 1 son, 2 daughters
- Profession: Politician
- Website: narayanchandel.in

Narayan Chandel (born 19 April 1965) is an Indian politician and former Leader Of Opposition of Bharatiya Janata Party, Chhattisgarh State. He represented Janjgir-Champa and also served as Deputy speaker of Chhattisgarh Legislative Assembly.

== Political career ==
Chandel was first elected to Madhya Pradesh Legislative Assembly in 1998. After creation of Chhattisgarh state from Madhya Pradesh, he contested 2003 Chhattisgarh Legislative Assembly election from same constituency but lost to Moti Lal Dewangan of Indian National Congress by margin of 7,710 votes.

Again, he won 2008 assembly election and became Deputy Speaker in Chhattisgarh Legislative Assembly. In 2018, Chandel was again elected to assembly by defeating Moti Lal Dewangan of Congress Party by margin of 4,188 votes.
