= Badridhar Deewan =

Indian politician (1929–2021)

Member of Chhattisgarh Legislative Assembly
- In office 8 December 2008 – 11 December 2018
- Preceded by: Constituency established
- Succeeded by: Rajnish Kumar Singh
- Constituency: Beltara

Deputy speaker of Chhattisgarh legislative assembly
- In office 23 July 2015 – 12 December 2018
- Speaker: Gaurishankar Agrawal
- Preceded by: Narayan Chandel
- Succeeded by: Manoj Singh Mandavi
- In office 12 July 2005 – 11 December 2008
- Speaker: Prem Prakash Pandey
- Preceded by: Dharmjeet Singh Thakur
- Succeeded by: Narayan Chandel

Personal details
- Born: 27 November 1929 Deori, Bilaspur district, Chhattisgarh
- Died: 4 May 2021 (aged 91) Bilaspur, India
- Party: Bharatiya Janta Party
- Children: 3 sons (including Vijay Dhar Diwan)
- Occupation: Politician

Badridhar Deewan (27 November 1929 – 4 May 2021) was an Indian politician and a Bharatiya Janata Party leader from Chhattisgarh, India. He was a member of the Chhattisgarh Legislative Assembly from Beltara. Deewan twice served as the deputy speaker of the Chhattisgarh legislative assembly.
