= Ganesh Shankar Bajpai =

Indian politician

Ganesh Shankar Bajpai is an Indian politician who was the member of Chhattisgarh Legislative Assembly from Baloda Bazar Assembly constituency ( no 47) then Raipur district, (now Baloda Bazar district ), during 2003–2008.
