= Keshaw Prasad Chandra =

Indian politician

Keshaw Prasad Chandra is an Indian politician and was the member of the Chhattisgarh Legislative Assembly for the constituency of Jaijaipur from 2013 till 2023. He is a member of the Bahujan Samaj Party.
