= Rajendra Prasad Shukla =

Indian politician

Rajendra Prasad Shukla (Hindi: राजेन्द्र प्रसाद शुक्ल, (10 February 1930 – 20 August 2006) was an indian politician from the state of Madhya Pradesh and Chhattisgarh. He had been an M.L.A. to Madhya Pradesh Legislative Assembly several times, he was elected Speaker there in mid 1980s, as minister in early 1990s. Later after formation of Chhattisgarh, he was elected from Kota, Bilaspur to Chhattisgarh Legislative Assembly and became first speaker of Chhattisgarh. Rajendra Prasad Shukla had been a prestigious leader for Kargi road Kota.

== Family background ==
Rajendra Prasad Shukla was married to Leela Devi Shukla, with whom he has 3 sons and 3 daughters. Pradeep Shukla, Deepa Mishra,
