= Manoj Singh Mandavi =

Indian politician (1964–2022)

Deputy speaker of Chhattisgarh legislative assembly
- In office 2 December 2019 – 16 October 2022
- Preceded by: Badridhar Deewan
- Succeeded by: Santram Netam

Member of the Chhattisgarh Legislative Assembly
- In office 13 December 2013 – 16 October 2022
- Preceded by: Bramhanand
- Succeeded by: Savitri Manoj Mandavi
- Constituency: Bhanupratappur

Personal details
- Born: 14 November 1964 Telagara, Madhya Pradesh, India
- Died: 16 October 2022 (aged 57) Dhamtari, Chhattisgarh, India
- Party: Indian National Congress
- Other political affiliations: Independent (2008–2013)
- Spouse: Savitri Manoj Mandavi (m. 1995)
- Children: 2
- Education: Ravishankar University Raipur (B.A., M.A.)

Manoj Singh Mandavi (14 November 1964 – 16 October 2022) was an Indian politician and a member of the 4th Chhattisgarh Legislative Assembly, elected from the Bhanupratappur constituency in the 2018 Chhattisgarh Legislative Assembly election. He was a member of the Indian National Congress.

== Early life and education ==
Mandavi was born on 14 November 1964 to Hari Shankar Mandavi (Thakur) and hailed from Telagara village, then in Bastar district of Madhya Pradesh, presently in Kanker district of Chhattisgarh. He graduated with a Bachelor of Arts degree in 1986 and earned a Master of Arts in Sociology in 1988, both from Government Degree College, Kanker affiliated to Ravishankar University Raipur.

== Political career ==
Mandavi was elected as a Member of the Legislative Assembly of the state of Madhya Pradesh in 1998. Following the creation of the state of Chhattisgarh by the Madhya Pradesh Reorganisation Act, 2000 Mandavi became a member of the new state's legislative assembly. He served as Minister of State for home and prisons in Ajit Jogi's government of Chhattisgarh between 2000 and 2003. Mandavi contested from the Bhanupratappur constituency for the first time in 2003 as an Indian National Congress (INC) candidate, but lost to BJP's Deo Lal Dugga by a margin of only 1379 votes. In the next legislative election of 2008, now contesting as an Independent candidate, he lost to BJP's Bramhanand by 15479 votes.

In 2013, Mandavi won in the Bhanupratappur constituency as an INC candidate with 64,837 votes, defeating BJP's Satish Latiya and securing 45.98% of the total vote share. He repeated this in the 2018 Chhattisgarh Legislative Assembly election with 72,520 votes, gaining 49.07% of the total vote share and defeating BJP's Deo Lal Dugga in the process.

On 30 November 2019, Mandavi filed nomination papers for the post of Deputy Speaker in the 4th Chhattisgarh Legislative Assembly. He was elected to the post unanimously on 2 December 2019. He was succeeded by his wife Savitri Manoj Mandavi, who won the bye election after his death.

== Personal life and death ==
Mandavi married Savitri Manoj Mandavi on 21 February 1995, with whom he had two sons. They lived in Nathia Nawagaon in Charama tehsil of Kanker district of Chhattisgarh.

Mandavi fell ill in his home village of Nathia Nawagaon on 15 October 2022. He was taken to hospital in nearby Charama before being transferred to a hospital at Dhamtari where he died on 16 October, after suffering a heart attack. To mark Mandavi's death, the state government implemented a one-day period of mourning in Kanker district and the capital city of Raipur on 16 October 2022. Government-hosted entertainment was cancelled and the national flag was flown at half mast. Mandavi was to be buried in his village later that day.
