= Janta Congress Chhattisgarh =

Political party in India

Janta Congress Chhattisgarh (J)
- Abbreviation: JCC
- Leader: Amit Jogi
- General Secretary: Mahesh Dewangan Santosh Gupta
- Founder: Ajit Jogi
- Founded: 23 June 2016 (9 years ago)
- Split from: Indian National Congress
- Headquarters: Shri Balaji Complex, Near Gandhi Maidan, Khamtarai, Raipur, Chhattisgarh - 492001
- Colours: Pink
- ECI Status: State Party
- Alliance: JCC+BSP+CPI (2018)
- Seats in Chhattisgarh Legislative Assembly: 0 / 90

Election symbol
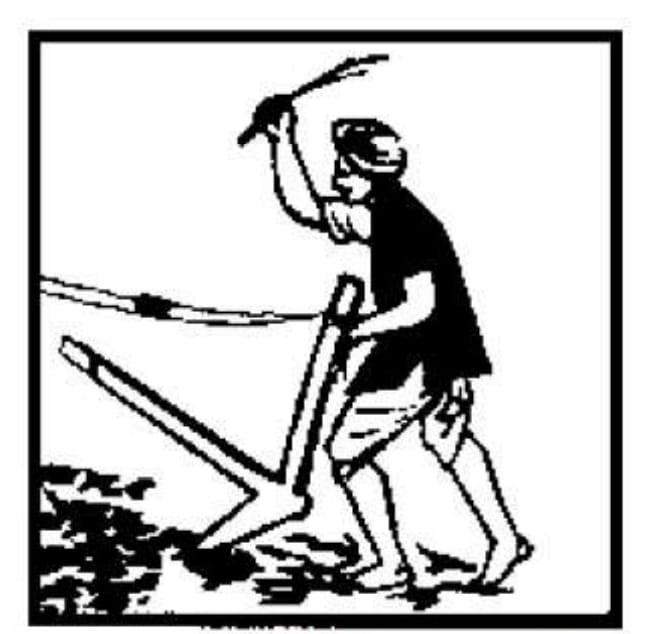

Janta Congress Chhattisgarh (J) (transl. People's Congress Chhattisgarh; abbr. JCC) is a political party in the Indian state of Chhattisgarh. The party was founded by former Chief Minister, Ajit Jogi, after Jogi and his son Amit were expelled from Indian National Congress due to anti-party activities as well as sabotaging a bypoll election in Antagarh. Amit Jogi was expelled for six years.

Ajit Jogi launched the party in Thathapur village of Kawardha district and directly challenged Chief Minister of Chhattisgarh Raman Singh.

== Elections ==
=== 2018 Chhattisgarh Assembly election ===
The JCC and BSP decided to fight in the 2018 Chhattisgarh Legislative Assembly election in alliance with each other according to which, JCC contested on 55 seats while BSP contested on 35 seats. The alliance declared Ajit Jogi as its Chief Ministerial candidate. Later, the CPI also gave support to this alliance. The alliance strongly condemns the policies of both the main parties in the state, the BJP and INC and gives a new platform to the people of Chhattisgarh in the form of a third front. Ajit Jogi released the manifesto on stamp paper and said, "I am ready to go to the jail if the promises remain unfulfilled". However the alliance was badly defeated as it could manage to win only seven seats out of the 90 seats in which JCC won five seats and its alliance partner BSP won two seats.

=== 2023 Chhattisgarh Assembly election ===
The JCC broke its alliance with BSP and decided to contest the election alone. Party head Amit Jogi decided to contest from Patan, the seat of the current Chief Ministers Bhupesh Baghel. The party failed to win any seat and got negligible vote share.

== Electoral performance ==
Chhattisgarh Legislative Assembly elections
Election Year	Party leader	Seats contested	Seats won	Change in seats	Percentage of votes	Vote swing	Popular vote	Alliance	Result
2018	Ajit Jogi	57	5 / 90	▲5	7.61%	–	1,086,514	JCC + BSP + CPI	Lost
2023	Amit Jogi	77	0 / 90	▼5	1.25%	▼6.36%	-	-	Lost

== See also ==
- Indian National Congress breakaway parties
- List of political parties in India
- Category:Janta Congress Chhattisgarh politicians
