= 2018 Chhattisgarh Legislative Assembly election =

Elections in India

- 12 and 20 November 2018

All 90 seats in the Chhattisgarh Legislative Assembly 46 seats needed for a majority
- Opinion polls
- Registered: 18,588,520
- Turnout: 76.88% (▼0.57%)
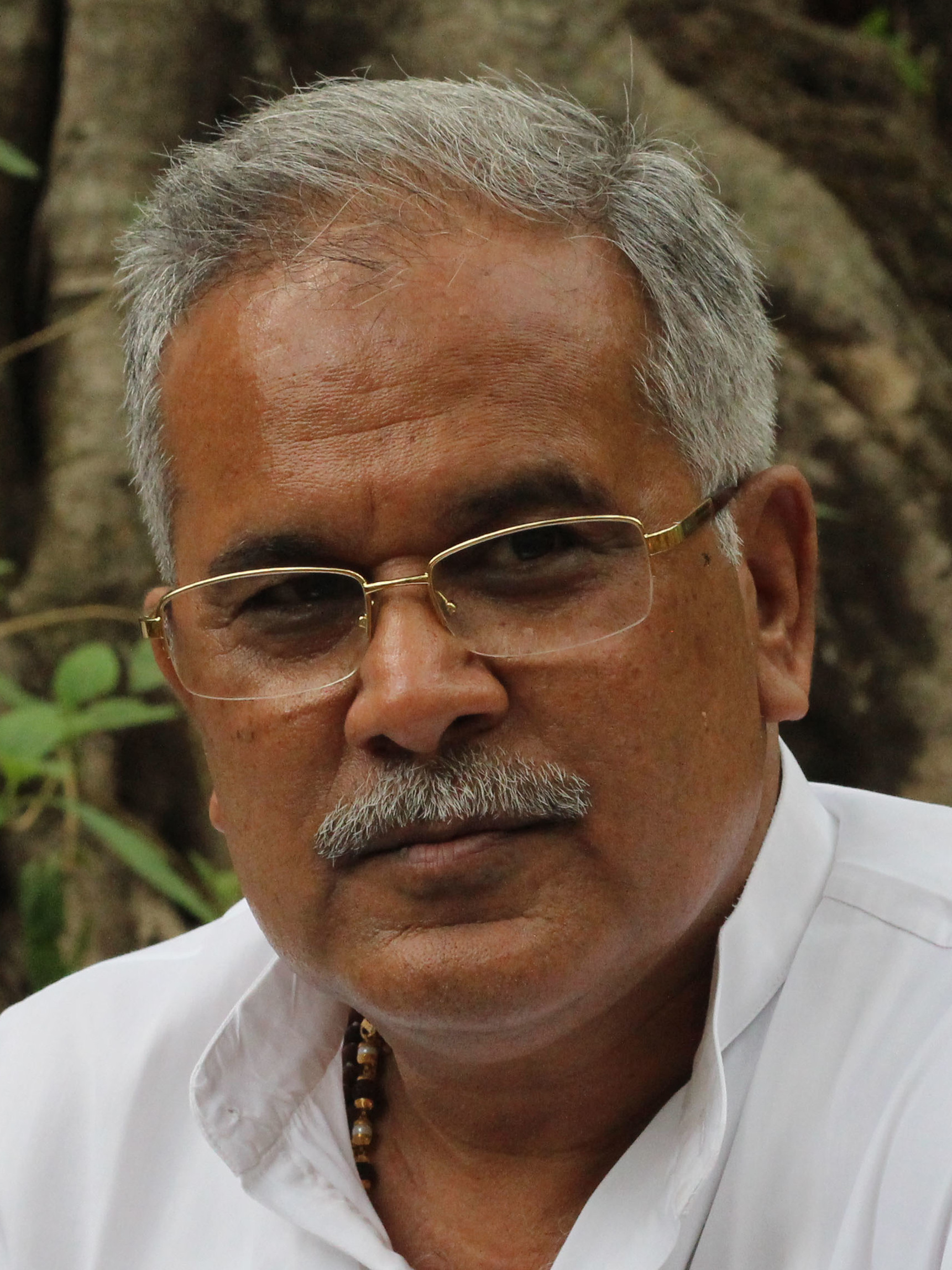

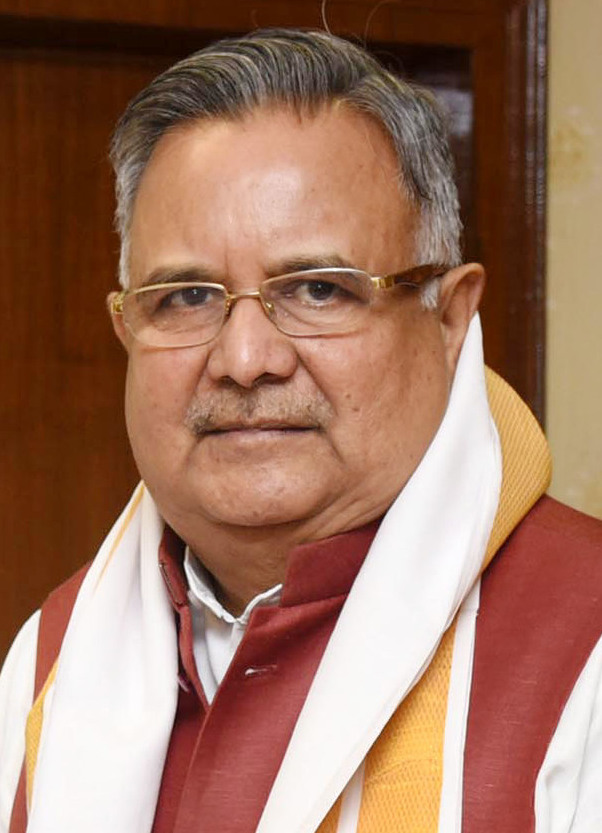

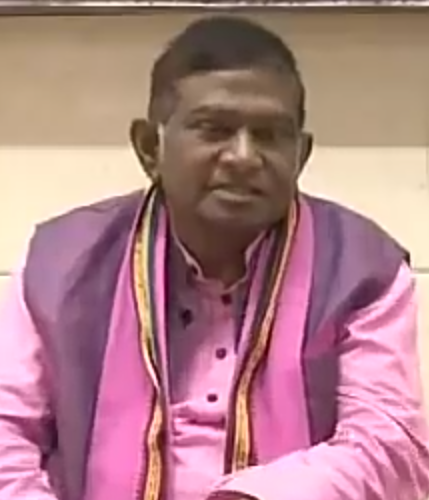

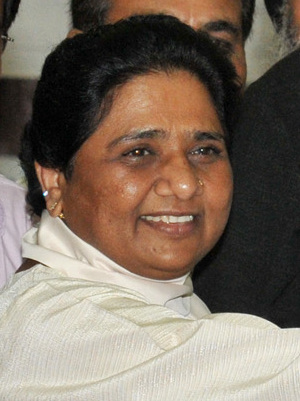
	Majority party	Minority party
Leader	Bhupesh Baghel	Raman Singh
Party	INC	BJP
Alliance	UPA	NDA
Leader since	2014	2003
Leader's seat	Patan	Rajnandgaon
Last election	39	49
Seats won	68	15
Seat change	▲29	▼34
Popular vote	6,136,429	4,701,530
Percentage	43.0%	33.0%
Swing	▲2.71%	▼8.04%
	Third party	Fourth party
Leader	Ajit Jogi	Mayawati
Party	JCC	BSP
Alliance	JCC + BSP	BSP + JCC
Leader since	2016	2003
Leader's seat	Marwahi	Did not contest
Last election	new party	1
Seats won	5	2
Seat change	▲5	▲1
Popular vote	1,081,760	552,313
Percentage	7.6%	3.9%
Swing	▲7.6%	▼0.37%
- Seatwise map of the election results

- Structure of the Chhattisgarh Legislative Assembly after the election
Chief Minister before election
Raman Singh
BJP
CM After
Bhupesh Baghel
INC

The 2018 Chhattisgarh Legislative Assembly election was held to elect members to the Legislative Assembly of the Indian State of Chhattisgarh. The election was held in two phases for a total of 90 seats; the first for 18 seats in South Chhattisgarh on 12 November 2018, and the second for the remaining 72 on 20 November.

The INC got a landslide victory winning 68 seats against the ruling BJP's 15 seats, and consequently formed the government after 15 years as opposition party. Incumbent Chief Minister Raman Singh resigned on 11 December, the day of counting and declaration of result, taking the responsibility for the defeat in the elections. Elected to the Assembly from Patan, INC leader Bhupesh Baghel took office on 17 December as the third Chief Minister of the State.

Election map (Constituencies)

Chhattisgarh

== Background ==
The tenure of Chhattisgarh Legislative Assembly ends on 5 January 2019.

== Schedule ==
The Election Commission of India announced the election dates on 6 October 2018. It said the election would take place in two phases: phase one on 12 November in the left-wing extremism-affected areas that encompassed eighteen constituencies, and on 20 November in the remaining constituencies. The commission also announced that the Model Code of Conduct came into effect with the said announcement and that the results would be declared on 11 December.

Event dates	Phase I	Phase II
Filing nominations	16–23 October	26 October–2 November
Scrutiny of nominations	24 October	3 November
Withdrawal of candidatures	26 October	5 November
Polling	12 November	20 November
Counting	11 December	

== Seat Allotment ==
Alliance/Party		Flag	Symbol	Leader	Seats contested	
Indian National Congress				Bhupesh Baghel	90	
Bharatiya Janata Party				Raman Singh	90	
JJP+	Janta Congress Chhattisgarh			Amit Jogi	57	90+3
JJP+	Bahujan Samaj Party			Hemant Poyam	33+3	90+3

== Candidates ==
District	No.	Constituency	INC		BJP		JCC + BSP	
District	No.	Constituency	Party	Candidate	Party	Candidate	Party	Candidate
Manendragarh-Chirmiri-Bharatpur	1	Bharatpur-Sonhat (ST)	INC	Gulab Kamro	BJP	Champadevi Pawle	BSP	Krishana Prasad Cherva
Manendragarh-Chirmiri-Bharatpur	2	Manendragarh	INC	Dr. Vinay Jaiswal	BJP	Shyam Bihari Jaiswal	JCC	Lakhan Lal Shrivastava
Koriya	3	Baikunthpur	INC	Ambica Singh Deo	BJP	Bhaiyalal Rajwade	JCC	Bihari Lal Rajwade
Surajpur	4	Premnagar	INC	Khel Sai Singh	BJP	Vijay Pratap Singh	JCC	Pankaj Tiwari
Surajpur	5	Bhatgaon	INC	Paras Nath Rajwade	BJP	Rajni Ravishankar Tripathi	JCC	Surendra Choudhary
Balrampur	6	Pratappur (ST)	INC	Dr. Premsai Singh Tekam	BJP	Ramsewak Paikra	JCC	Dr. Narendra Pratap Singh
Balrampur	7	Ramanujganj (ST)	INC	Brihaspat Singh	BJP	Ramkishun Singh	JCC	Mohan Singh
Balrampur	8	Samri (ST)	INC	Chintamani Mahraj	BJP	Sidhnath Paikra	BSP	Mitkoo Bhagat
Surguja	9	Lundra (ST)	INC	Dr. Pritam Ram (E)	BJP	Vijaynath Singh	BSP	Maya Bhagat
Surguja	10	Ambikapur	INC	T. S. Baba (E)	BJP	Anurag Singh Deo	BSP	Sita Ram Das
Surguja	11	Sitapur (ST)	INC	Amarjeet Bhagat (E)	BJP	Professor Gopal Ram	JCC	Setram Bara
Jashpur	12	Jashpur (ST)	INC	Vinay Kumar Bhagat	BJP	Govind Ram Bhagat	BSP	Gaganmati Bhagat
Jashpur	13	Kunkuri (ST)	INC	U. D. Minj	BJP	Bharat Sai	BSP	Benjamin Minj
Jashpur	14	Pathalgaon (ST)	INC	Rampukar Singh Thakur	BJP	Shivshankar Painkara	JCC	M. S. Painkara
Raigarh	15	Lailunga (ST)	INC	Chakradhar Singh Sidar	BJP	Satyanand Rathiya	JCC	Hridya Ram Rathiya
Raigarh	16	Raigarh	INC	Prakash Shakrajeet Naik	BJP	Roshanlal	JCC	Vibhas Singh Thakur
Raigarh	17	Sarangarh (SC)	INC	Uttari Ganpat Jangde	BJP	Kera Bai Manahar	BSP	Arvind Khatker
Raigarh	18	Kharsia	INC	Umesh Patel	BJP	Op Choudhary	BSP	Narayan Sidar
Raigarh	19	Dharamjaigarh (ST)	INC	Laljeet Singh Rathia	BJP	Leenav Birju Rathia	JCC	Santram Rathia
Korba	20	Rampur (ST)	INC	Shyam Lal Kanwar	BJP	Nanki Ram Kanwar	JCC	Phool Singh Rathiya
Korba	21	Korba	INC	Jaisingh Agrawal	BJP	Vikas Mahto	JCC	Ram Singh Agrawal
Korba	22	Katghora	INC	Purushottam Kanwar	BJP	Lakhanlal Dewangan	JCC	Govind Singh Rajput
Korba	23	Pali-Tanakhar (ST)	INC	Mohit Ram	BJP	Uike Ramdyal	BSP	Tapeshwar Singh Maravi
Gaurela-Pendra-Marwahi	24	Marwahi (ST)	INC	Gulab Singh Raj	BJP	Archana Porte	JCC	Ajit Jogi
Gaurela-Pendra-Marwahi	25	Kota	INC	Vibhor Singh	BJP	Kashi Ram Sahu	JCC	Renu Ajit Jogi
Mungeli	26	Lormi	INC	Shatruhan (Sonu) Chandrakar	BJP	Tokhan Sahu	JCC	Dharmjeet Singh
Mungeli	27	Mungeli (SC)	INC	Rakesh Patre	BJP	Punnulal Mohale	JCC	Chandrabhan Barmate
Bilaspur	28	Takhatpur	INC	Rashmi Ashish Singh	BJP	Harshita Pandey	JCC	Santosh Kaushik (Guruji)
Bilaspur	29	Bilha	INC	Rajendra Shukla	BJP	Dharam Lal Kaushik	JCC	Siyaram Kaushik
Bilaspur	30	Bilaspur	INC	Shailesh Pandey	BJP	Amar Agrawal	JCC	Brijesh Sahu
Bilaspur	31	Beltara	INC	Rajendra Sahu (Dabbu)	BJP	Rajnish Kumar Singh	JCC	Anil Tah
Bilaspur	32	Masturi (SC)	INC	Dilip Lahariya	BJP	Dr. Krishna Murti Bandhi	BSP	Jayendra Singh Patle
Janjgir–Champa	33	Akaltara	INC	Chunnilal Sahu	BJP	Saurabh Singh	BSP	Richa Jogi
Janjgir–Champa	34	Janjgir-Champa	INC	Motilal Dewangan	BJP	Narayan Chandel	BSP	Byas Narayan Kashyap
Janjgir–Champa	35	Sakti	INC	Charan Das Mahant	BJP	Medha Ram Sahu	BSP	Gautam Rathore
Janjgir–Champa	36	Chandrapur	INC	Ram Kumar Yadav	BJP	Bahu Rani Sanyogita Singh Judev	BSP	Gitanjali Patel
Janjgir–Champa	37	Jaijaipur	INC	Anil Kumar Chandra	BJP	Kailash Sahu	BSP	Keshav Prasad Chandra
Janjgir–Champa	38	Pamgarh (SC)	INC	Gorelal Barman	BJP	Ambesh Jangre	BSP	Indu Banjare
Mahasamund	39	Saraipali (SC)	INC	Kismat Lal Nand	BJP	Shyam Tandi	BSP	Chhabilal Ratre
Mahasamund	40	Basna	INC	Devendra Bahadur Singh	BJP	Durgacharan (D.C.) Patel	JCC	Trilochan Nayak Lungiwala
Mahasamund	41	Khallari	INC	Dwarikadhish Yadav	BJP	Monika Dilip Sahu	JCC	Paresh Bagbahara
Mahasamund	42	Mahasamund	INC	Vinod Sevan Lal Chandrakar	BJP	Poonam Chandrakar	JCC	Tribhuwan Mahilang
Baloda Bazar	43	Bilaigarh (SC)	INC	Chandradev Prasad Rai	BJP	Dr. Sanam Jangde	JCC	Fulmani Tandan (Note: Friendly fight between Janta Congress Chhattisgarh and Bahujan Samaj Party. Bahujan Samaj Party fielded Shyam Kumar Tandan in Bilaigarh (SC) (43))
Baloda Bazar	44	Kasdol	INC	Shakuntala Sahu	BJP	Gaurishankar Agrawal	JCC	Parmeshwar Yadu (Note: Friendly fight between Janta Congress Chhattisgarh and Bahujan Samaj Party. Bahujan Samaj Party fielded Rameshwar Prasad Kaiwart in Kasdol (44))
Baloda Bazar	45	Balodabazar	INC	Janak Ram Verma	BJP	Tesu Lal Dhurandhar	JCC	Pramod Kumar Sharma
Baloda Bazar	46	Bhatapara	INC	Sunil Maheshwari	BJP	Shivratan Sharma	JCC	Chaitram Sahu
Raipur	47	Dharsiwa	INC	Anita Yogendra Sharma	BJP	Devji Bhai Patel	JCC	Panna Lal Sahu
Raipur	48	Raipur City Gramin	INC	Satyanarayan Sharma	BJP	Nand Kumar Sahu	JCC	Dr. Omprakash Dewangan
Raipur	49	Raipur City West	INC	Vikas Upadhyay	BJP	Rajesh Munat	BSP	Bhojraj Gaurkhede
Raipur	50	Raipur City North	INC	Kuldeep Juneja	BJP	Shri Chand Sundrani	JCC	Amar Gidwani
Raipur	51	Raipur City South	INC	Kanhaiya Agrawal	BJP	Brijmohan Agrawal	BSP	Umesh Das Manikpuri
Raipur	52	Arang (SC)	INC	Dr. Shivkumar Dahariya	BJP	Sanjay Dhidhi	JCC	Sanjay Chelak
Raipur	53	Abhanpur	INC	Dhanendra Sahu	BJP	Chandrashekhar Sahu	JCC	Dayaram Nishad
Gariaband	54	Rajim	INC	Amitesh Shukla	BJP	Santosh Upadhyay	JCC	Rohit Sahu
Gariaband	55	Bindranawagarh (ST)	INC	Sanjay Netam	BJP	Damarudhar Pujari	BSP	Devendra Thakur
Dhamtari	56	Sihawa (ST)	INC	Dr. Lakshmi Dhruw	BJP	Pinky Shivraj Shah	JCC	Shantanu Som
Dhamtari	57	Kurud	INC	Laxmikanta Sahu	BJP	Ajay Chandrakar	BSP	Kanhaiya Lal Sahu
Dhamtari	58	Dhamtari	INC	Gurumukh Singh Hora	BJP	Ranjana Dipendra Sahu	JCC	Digvijay Singh Kridutt
Balod	59	Sanjari Balod	INC	Sangeeta Sinha	BJP	Pawan Sahu	JCC	Arjun Hirwani
Balod	60	Dondi Lohara (ST)	INC	Anila Bhendia	BJP	Lal Mahendra Singh Tekam	JCC	Rajesh Churendra
Balod	61	Gunderdehi	INC	Kunwer Singh Nishad	BJP	Deepak Tarachand Sahu	JCC	Rajendra Kumar Rai
Durg	62	Patan	INC	Bhupesh Baghel	BJP	Motilal Sahu	JCC	Shakuntala Sahu
Durg	63	Durg Gramin	INC	Tamradhwaj Sahu	BJP	Jageshwar Sahu	JCC	Dr. Balmukund Dewangan
Durg	64	Durg City	INC	Arun Vora	BJP	Chandrika Chandrakar	JCC	Pratap Madhyani
Durg	65	Bhilai Nagar	INC	Devendra Yadav	BJP	Prem Prakash Pandey	BSP	Deenanath Jaiswar
Durg	66	Vaishali Nagar	INC	Badruddin Qureshi	BJP	Vidya Ratan Bhasin	JCC	Manoj Kumar
Durg	67	Ahiwara (SC)	INC	Guru Rudra Kumar	BJP	Rajmahant Sanwla Ram Dahre	BSP	Dr. Shobha Ram Banjare
Bemetara	68	Saja	INC	Ravindra Chaube	BJP	Labhchand Bafna	JCC	Teksingh Chandel
Bemetara	69	Bemetara	INC	Ashish Kumar Chhabra	BJP	Awadhesh Singh Chandel	JCC	Yogesh Tiwari
Bemetara	70	Navagarh (SC)	INC	Gurudayal Singh Banjare	BJP	Dayaldas Baghel	BSP	Omprakash Batchpayi
Kabirdham	71	Pandariya	INC	Mamta Chandrakar	BJP	Motiram Chandravanshi	BSP	Chaitram Raj
Kabirdham	72	Kawardha	INC	Akbar Bhai	BJP	Ashok Sahu	JCC	Agam Das Anant
Rajnandgaon	73	Khairagarh	INC	Girwar Janghel	BJP	Komal Janghel	JCC	Devwrat Singh
Rajnandgaon	74	Dongargarh (SC)	INC	Bhuneshwar Shobharam Baghel	BJP	Sarojani Banjare	BSP	Mishri Lal Markande
Rajnandgaon	75	Rajnandgaon	INC	Karuna Shukla	BJP	Dr. Raman Singh	JCC	Deepak Yadav
Rajnandgaon	76	Dongargaon	INC	Daleshwar Sahu	BJP	Madhusudan Yadav	BSP	Ashok Verma
Rajnandgaon	77	Khujji	INC	Chhanni Chandu Sahu	BJP	Hirendra Kumar Sahu	JCC	Jarnail Singh Bhatiya
Rajnandgaon	78	Mohala-Manpur (ST)	INC	Indrashah Mandavi	BJP	Kanchan Mala Bhuarya	JCC	Sanjeet Thakur
Kanker	79	Antagarh (ST)	INC	Anoop Nag	BJP	Vikram Usendi	BSP	Hemant Poyam
Kanker	80	Bhanupratappur (ST)	INC	Manoj Singh Mandavi	BJP	Deo Lal Dugga	JCC	Manak Darpatti
Kanker	81	Kanker (ST)	INC	Shishupal Shori	BJP	Hira Markam	BSP	Ramsahay Korram
Kondagaon	82	Keshkal (ST)	INC	Sant Ram Netam	BJP	Harishankar Netam	BSP	Jugalkishor Bodh
Kondagaon	83	Kondagaon (ST)	INC	Mohan Markam	BJP	Lata Usendi	BSP	Narendra Netam
Narayanpur	84	Narayanpur (ST)	INC	Chandan Kashyap 'E'	BJP	Kedar Kashyap	JCC	Baliram Kachlam
Bastar	85	Bastar (ST)	INC	Baghel Lakheshwar [E]	BJP	Dr. Subhau Kashyap	JCC	Sonsay Kashyap
Bastar	86	Jagdalpur	INC	Rekhchand Jain [E]	BJP	Santosh Bafna	JCC	Amit Pandey
Bastar	87	Chitrakot (ST)	INC	Deepak Baij [E]	BJP	Lachhuram Kashyap	JCC	Tankeshwar Bhardwaj
Dantewada	88	Dantewara (ST)	INC	Devati Karma	BJP	Bhima Mandavi	BSP	Keshav Netam
Bijapur	89	Bijapur (ST)	INC	Vikram Mandavi	BJP	Mahesh Gagda	JCC	Chandraiya Sakni
Sukma	90	Konta (ST)	INC	Kawasi Lakhma	BJP	Dhaniram Barse	BSP	Budhram Kartami

== Opinion polls ==
Opinion polls showed a tough competition between the Bharatiya Janata Party (BJP) and the Indian National Congress (INC), but the alliance between Janta Congress Chhattisgarh (JCC) and Bahujan Samaj Party (BSP) also showed similar numbers to that of the former two.

Date	Polling agency	BJP	INC	Others	Lead
9 November 2018	ABP News- CSDS	56	25	04	31
9 November 2018	Cvoter	43	41	07	2
2 November 2018	ABP News- C Voter	43	42	06	1
25 October 2018	IndiaTV - CNX	50	30	10	20
17 October 2018	ABP News- C Voter	40	47	3	7
10 October 2018	News Nation	46	39	5	7
9 October 2018	TimesNow- Warroom Strategies	47	33	10	14
14 August 2018	ABP News- C Voter	33	54	3	21
28 July 2018	Spick Media	36	53	1	17
3 April 2018	IBC24	48	34	8	14
Average as on 9 November 2018		44	40	6	4

== Polling ==
According to the Election Commission of India, a total of 4,300 booths for the region's registered 1.62 million women and 1.55 million male voters were set up for the first phase of polls. The first phase of election, in 18 constituencies, saw a voter turnout of 76.42 per cent according to the commission, an increase from 75.06 per cent in 2013. This came despite calls from the Naxalites in the region to boycott the election. A total of 125,000 police and paramilitary personnel were posted across the 18 constituencies, which were spread over the Naxalism-affected districts such as Bastar, Kanker, Sukma, Bijapur, Dantewada, Narayanpur, Kondagaon and Rajnandgaon. However, the polls saw two major disruptions. An improvised explosive device (IED) went off in Katekalyan, in Dantewada, before voting began. In Bijapur district, an encounter between Naxalites and the 204th battalion of the Central Reserve Police Force's (CRPF) COBRA unit left 10 Naxalites killed and five CRPF personnel injured.

The campaigning ahead of the second phase concluded on 18 November. In an incident of another IED blast, three security personnel were killed that day in the Bheji and Elarmadgu villages of Sukma district. However, voting on 20 November went "peaceful and incident-free". A turnout of 76.34 per cent was reported by the commission, while updating the figures of the first phase to 76.39 per cent. The Commission set up 19,336 polling stations for this phase of polling.

Overall, a total of 76.35 percent was reported across the State, a minor drop from 77.40 percent in 2013. 38 constituencies, most of which fell primarily in rural areas, reported a turnout of more than 80 percent. Kurud reported the highest turnout at 88.99 percent, followed by Kharsiya at 86.81 percent, while Bijapur reported the lowest at 44.68 percent. Ahead of counting and the declaration of result on 11 December, 28 companies of the Central Armed Police Forces were posted to guard rooms were the EVMs were kept.

== Exit polls ==
Most of the exit polls predicted a "tight finish" between the BJP and the INC.

Polling agency	BJP	INC	Others	Lead
CSDS – ABP News	52	35	03	17
CNX– Times Now	46	35	09	11
C Voter – Republic TV	39	45	05	06
News Nation	40	44	06	04
Jan Ki Baat– Republic TV	44	40	06	04
News 24-Pace Media	39	48	03	9
Axis My India – India Today	26	60	04	24
News X- NETA	42	41	07	01
Today's Chanakya	36	50	04	14
News 18- Surjit Bhalla	46	37	07	09
Poll of Polls	41	44	05	03

== Results ==
=== Seats and vote-share ===
The results gave the Indian National Congress a clear majority and differed from the trend shown by the Opinion and Exit polls. The BJPs count fell drastically, while the INC formed a majority Government. The seat and vote share was as follows -

Parties and coalitions	Popular vote			Seats		
Parties and coalitions	Votes	%	±pp	Won	+/−	%
Indian National Congress (INC)	6,143,880	43.0%	▲2.71%	68	▲29	75.6
Bharatiya Janata Party (BJP)	4,706,830	33.0%	▼8.04%	15	▼34	16.7
Janta Congress Chhattisgarh (JCC)	1,086,514	7.6%	New	5	New	5.5
Bahujan Samaj Party (BSP)	552,313	3.9%	▼0.37%	2	▲1	2.2
None of the Above (NOTA)	282,588	2.0%				
Total	1,42,76,255	100.00		90	±0	100.0
Valid votes	13,993,667	99.9				
Invalid votes	14,242	0.1				
Votes cast / turnout	14,290,497	76.88				
Abstentions	4,298,023	23.12				
Registered voters	18,588,520					

=== Results by district ===
District	Seats				
District	Seats	INC	BJP	JCC	BSP
Manendragarh-Chirmiri-Bharatpur	2	2	—N/a	—N/a	—N/a
Koriya	1	1	—N/a	—N/a	—N/a
Surajpur	2	2	—N/a	—N/a	—N/a
Balrampur	3	3	—N/a	—N/a	—N/a
Surguja	3	3	—N/a	—N/a	—N/a
Jashpur	3	3	—N/a	—N/a	—N/a
Raigarh	5	5	—N/a	—N/a	—N/a
Korba	4	3	1	—N/a	—N/a
Gaurela-Pendra-Marwahi	2	—N/a	—N/a	2	—N/a
Mungeli	2	—N/a	1	1	—N/a
Bilaspur	5	2	3	—N/a	—N/a
Janjgir–Champa	6	2	2	—N/a	2
Mahasamund	4	4	—N/a	—N/a	—N/a
Baloda Bazar	4	2	1	1	—N/a
Raipur	7	6	1	—N/a	—N/a
Gariaband	2	1	1	—N/a	—N/a
Dhamtari	3	1	2	—N/a	—N/a
Balod	3	3	—N/a	—N/a	—N/a
Durg	6	5	1	—N/a	—N/a
Bemetara	3	3	—N/a	—N/a	—N/a
Kabirdham	2	2	—N/a	—N/a	—N/a
Rajnandgaon	6	4	1	1	—N/a
Kanker	3	3	—N/a	—N/a	—N/a
Kondagaon	2	2	—N/a	—N/a	—N/a
Narayanpur	1	1	—N/a	—N/a	—N/a
Bastar	3	3	—N/a	—N/a	—N/a
Dantewada	1	—N/a	1	—N/a	—N/a
Bijapur	1	1	—N/a	—N/a	—N/a
Sukma	1	1	—N/a	—N/a	—N/a
Total	90	68	15	5	2

== Elected members ==
District	Constituency		Winner				Runner Up				Margin	%
District	No.	Name	Candidate	Party	Votes	%	Candidate	Party	Votes	%	Margin	%
Manendragarh-Chirmiri-Bharatpur	1	Bharatpur-Sonhat (ST)	Gulab Kamro	INC	51,732	38.85	Champadevi Pawle	BJP	35,199	26.43	16,533	12.42
Manendragarh-Chirmiri-Bharatpur	2	Manendragarh	Dr. Vinay Jaiswal	INC	34,803	36.53	Shyam Bihari Jaiswal	BJP	30,792	32.32	4,011	4.21
Koriya	3	Baikunthpur	Ambica Singh Deo	INC	48,885	37.73	Bhaiyalal Rajwade	BJP	43,546	33.61	5,339	4.12
Surajpur	4	Premnagar	Khel Sai Singh	INC	66,475	38.75	Vijay Pratap Singh	BJP	51,135	29.81	15,340	8.94
Surajpur	5	Bhatgaon	Paras Nath Rajwade	INC	74,623	43.29	Rajni Ravishankar Tripathi	BJP	58,889	34.16	15,734	9.13
Balrampur	6	Pratappur (ST)	Dr. Premsai Singh Tekam	INC	90,148	51.70	Ramsewak Paikra	BJP	46,043	26.40	44,105	25.30
Balrampur	7	Ramanujganj (ST)	Brihaspat Singh	INC	64,580	41.70	Ramkishun Singh	BJP	31,664	20.45	32,916	21.25
Balrampur	8	Samri (ST)	Chintamani Mahraj	INC	80,620	49.51	Sidhnath Paikra	BJP	58,697	36.05	21,923	13.46
Surguja	9	Lundra (ST)	Dr. Pritam Ram (E)	INC	77,773	51.21	Vijaynath Singh	BJP	55,594	36.60	22,179	14.61
Surguja	10	Ambikapur	T.S. Baba (E)	INC	1,00,439	56.19	Anurag Singh Deo	BJP	60,815	34.02	39,624	22.17
Surguja	11	Sitapur (ST)	Amarjeet Bhagat (E)	INC	86,670	56.56	Professor Gopal Ram	BJP	50,533	32.98	36,137	23.58
Jashpur	12	Jashpur (ST)	Vinay Kumar Bhagat	INC	71,963	42.24	Govind Ram Bhagat	BJP	63,937	37.53	8,026	4.71
Jashpur	13	Kunkuri (ST)	U. D. Minj	INC	69,896	46.16	Bharat Sai	BJP	65,603	43.32	4,293	2.84
Jashpur	14	Pathalgaon (ST)	Rampukar Singh Thakur	INC	96,599	55.72	Shivshankar Painkara	BJP	59,913	34.56	36,686	21.16
Raigarh	15	Lailunga (ST)	Chakradhar Singh Sidar	INC	81,770	50.08	Satyanand Rathiya	BJP	57,287	35.09	24,483	14.99
Raigarh	16	Raigarh	Prakash Shakrajeet Naik	INC	69,062	36.06	Roshanlal	BJP	54,482	28.45	14,580	7.61
Raigarh	17	Sarangarh (SC)	Uttari Ganpat Jangde	INC	1,01,834	52.49	Kera Bai Manahar	BJP	49,445	25.48	52,389	27.01
Raigarh	18	Kharsia	Umesh Patel	INC	94,201	52.92	Op Choudhary	BJP	77,234	43.39	16,967	9.53
Raigarh	19	Dharamjaigarh (ST)	Laljeet Singh Rathia	INC	95,173	55.99	Leenav Birju Rathia	BJP	54,838	32.26	40,335	23.73
Korba	20	Rampur (ST)	Nanki Ram Kanwar	BJP	65,048	38.72	Phool Singh Rathiya	JCC	46,873	27.90	18,175	10.82
Korba	21	Korba	Jaisingh Agrawal	INC	70,119	43.28	Vikas Mahto	BJP	58,313	35.99	11,806	7.29
Korba	22	Katghora	Purushottam Kanwar	INC	59,227	38.46	Lakhanlal Dewangan	BJP	47,716	30.99	11,511	7.47
Korba	23	Pali-Tanakhar (ST)	Mohit Ram	INC	66,971	38.59	Hira Singh Markam	GGP	57,315	33.02	9,656	5.57
Gaurela-Pendra-Marwahi	24	Marwahi (ST)	Ajit Jogi	JCC	74,041	49.64	Archana Porte	BJP	27,579	18.49	46,462	31.15
Gaurela-Pendra-Marwahi	25	Kota	Renu Ajit Jogi	JCC	48,800	32.77	Kashi Ram Sahu	BJP	45,774	30.74	3,026	2.03
Mungeli	26	Lormi	Dharmjeet Singh	JCC	67,742	47.46	Tokhan Sahu	BJP	42,189	29.56	25,553	17.90
Mungeli	27	Mungeli (SC)	Punnulal Mohale	BJP	60,469	38.28	Rakesh Patre	INC	51,982	32.91	8,487	5.37
Bilaspur	28	Takhatpur	Rashmi Ashish Singh	INC	52,616	32.35	Santosh Kaushik (Guruji)	JCC	49,625	30.51	2,991	1.84
Bilaspur	29	Bilha	Dharam Lal Kaushik	BJP	84,431	43.00	Rajendra Shukla	INC	57,907	29.49	26,524	13.51
Bilaspur	30	Bilaspur	Shailesh Pandey	INC	67,896	50.57	Amar Agrawal	BJP	56,675	42.22	11,221	8.35
Bilaspur	31	Beltara	Rajnish Kumar Singh	BJP	49,601	34.49	Rajendra Sahu	INC	43,342	30.14	6,259	4.35
Bilaspur	32	Masturi (SC)	Dr. Krishna Murti Bandhi	BJP	67,950	36.37	Jayendra Singh Patle	BSP	53,843	28.82	14,107	7.55
Janjgir–Champa	33	Akaltara	Saurabh Singh	BJP	60,502	38.91	Richa Jogi	BSP	58,648	37.72	1,854	1.19
Janjgir–Champa	34	Janjgir-Champa	Narayan Chandel	BJP	54,040	36.73	Motilal Dewangan	INC	49,852	33.89	4,188	2.84
Janjgir–Champa	35	Sakti	Charan Das Mahant	INC	78,058	52.57	Medha Ram Sahu	BJP	48,012	32.33	30,046	20.24
Janjgir–Champa	36	Chandrapur	Ram Kumar Yadav	INC	51,717	31.96	Gitanjali Patel	BSP	47,299	29.23	4,418	2.73
Janjgir–Champa	37	Jaijaipur	Keshav Prasad Chandra	BSP	64,774	41.49	Kailash Sahu	BJP	43,087	27.60	21,687	13.89
Janjgir–Champa	38	Pamgarh (SC)	Indu Banjare	BSP	50,129	36.32	Gorelal Barman	INC	47,068	34.11	3,061	2.21
Mahasamund	39	Saraipali (SC)	Kismat Lal Nand	INC	1,00,302	63.34	Shyam Tandi	BJP	48,014	30.32	52,288	33.02
Mahasamund	40	Basna	Devendra Bahadur Singh	INC	67,535	38.50	Sampat Agrawal	IND	50,027	28.52	17,508	9.98
Mahasamund	41	Khallari	Dwarikadhish Yadav	INC	96,108	57.97	Monika Dilip Sahu	BJP	39,130	23.60	56,978	34.37
Mahasamund	42	Mahasamund	Vinod Sevan Lal Chandrakar	INC	49,356	31.91	Poonam Chandrakar	BJP	26,290	17.00	23,066	14.91
Baloda Bazar	43	Bilaigarh (SC)	Chandradev Prasad Rai	INC	71,936	36.19	Shyam Kumar Tandan	BSP	62,089	31.24	9,847	4.95
Baloda Bazar	44	Kasdol	Shakuntala Sahu	INC	1,21,422	49.14	Gaurishankar Agrawal	BJP	73,004	29.54	48,418	19.60
Baloda Bazar	45	Balodabazar	Pramod Kumar Sharma	JCC	65,251	33.34	Janak Ram Verma	INC	63,122	32.26	2,129	1.08
Baloda Bazar	46	Bhatapara	Shivratan Sharma	BJP	63,399	35.81	Sunil Maheshwari	INC	51,490	29.08	11,909	6.73
Raipur	47	Dharsiwa	Anita Yogendra Sharma	INC	78,989	48.02	Devji Bhai Patel	BJP	59,589	36.23	19,400	11.79
Raipur	48	Raipur City Gramin	Satyanarayan Sharma	INC	78,468	45.35	Nand Kumar Sahu	BJP	68,015	39.31	10,453	6.04
Raipur	49	Raipur City West	Vikas Upadhyay	INC	76,359	50.86	Rajesh Munat	BJP	64,147	42.73	12,212	8.13
Raipur	50	Raipur City North	Kuldeep Juneja	INC	59,843	54.40	Shri Chand Sundrani	BJP	43,502	39.54	16,341	14.86
Raipur	51	Raipur City South	Brijmohan Agrawal	BJP	77,589	52.70	Kanhaiya Agrawal	INC	60,093	40.82	17,496	11.88
Raipur	52	Arang (SC)	Dr. Shivkumar Dahariya	INC	69,900	45.10	Sanjay Dhidhi	BJP	44,823	28.92	25,077	16.18
Raipur	53	Abhanpur	Dhanendra Sahu	INC	76,761	47.08	Chandrashekhar Sahu	BJP	53,290	32.68	23,471	14.40
Gariaband	54	Rajim	Amitesh Shukla	INC	99,041	56.42	Santosh Upadhyay	BJP	40,909	23.30	58,132	33.12
Gariaband	55	Bindranawagarh (ST)	Damarudhar Pujari	BJP	79,619	44.10	Sanjay Netam	INC	69,189	38.32	10,430	5.78
Dhamtari	56	Sihawa (ST)	Dr. Lakshmi Dhruw	INC	88,451	56.45	Pinky Shivraj Shah	BJP	43,015	27.45	45,436	29.00
Dhamtari	57	Kurud	Ajay Chandrakar	BJP	72,922	42.27	Neelam Chandrakar	IND	60,605	35.13	12,317	7.14
Dhamtari	58	Dhamtari	Ranjana Dipendra Sahu	BJP	63,198	36.64	Gurumukh Singh Hora	INC	62,734	36.37	464	0.27
Balod	59	Sanjari Balod	Sangeeta Sinha	INC	90,428	51.53	Pawan Sahu	BJP	62,940	35.87	27,488	15.66
Balod	60	Dondi Lohara (ST)	Anila Bhendia	INC	67,448	40.46	Lal Mahendra Singh Tekam	BJP	34,345	20.60	33,103	19.86
Balod	61	Gunderdehi	Kunwer Singh Nishad	INC	1,10,369	59.11	Deepak Tarachand Sahu	BJP	54,975	29.45	55,394	29.66
Durg	62	Patan	Bhupesh Baghel	INC	84,352	51.85	Motilal Sahu	BJP	56,875	34.96	27,477	16.89
Durg	63	Durg Gramin	Tamradhwaj Sahu	INC	76,208	51.34	Jageshwar Sahu	BJP	49,096	33.08	27,112	18.26
Durg	64	Durg City	Arun Vora	INC	64,981	46.68	Chandrika Chandrakar	BJP	43,900	31.53	21,081	15.15
Durg	65	Bhilai Nagar	Devendra Yadav	INC	51,044	48.29	Prem Prakash Pandey	BJP	48,195	45.60	2,849	2.69
Durg	66	Vaishali Nagar	Vidya Ratan Bhasin	BJP	72,920	49.72	Badruddin Qureshi	INC	54,840	37.39	18,080	12.33
Durg	67	Ahiwara (SC)	Guru Rudra Kumar	INC	88,735	54.98	Rajmahant Sanwla Ram Dahre	BJP	57,048	35.35	31,687	19.63
Bemetara	68	Saja	Ravindra Chaube	INC	95,658	51.62	Labhchand Bafna	BJP	64,123	34.60	31,535	17.02
Bemetara	69	Bemetara	Ashish Kumar Chhabra	INC	74,914	43.35	Awadhesh Singh Chandel	BJP	49,783	28.81	25,131	14.54
Bemetara	70	Navagarh (SC)	Gurudayal Singh Banjare	INC	86,779	49.97	Dayaldas Baghel	BJP	53,579	30.85	33,200	19.12
Kabirdham	71	Pandariya	Mamta Chandrakar	INC	1,00,907	46.38	Motiram Chandravanshi	BJP	64,420	29.61	36,487	16.77
Kabirdham	72	Kawardha	Akbar Bhai	INC	1,36,320	56.63	Ashok Sahu	BJP	77,036	32.00	59,284	24.63
Rajnandgaon	73	Khairagarh	Devwrat Singh	JCC	61,516	36.08	Komal Janghel	BJP	60,646	35.57	870	0.51
Rajnandgaon	74	Dongargarh (SC)	Bhuneshwar Shobharam Baghel	INC	86,949	54.15	Sarojani Banjare	BJP	51,531	32.09	35,418	22.06
Rajnandgaon	75	Rajnandgaon	Dr. Raman Singh	BJP	80,589	51.69	Karuna Shukla	INC	63,656	40.83	16,933	10.86
Rajnandgaon	76	Dongargaon	Daleshwar Sahu	INC	84,581	52.37	Madhusudan Yadav	BJP	65,498	40.55	19,083	11.82
Rajnandgaon	77	Khujji	Chhanni Chandu Sahu	INC	71,733	47.18	Hirendra Kumar Sahu	BJP	44,236	29.09	27,497	18.09
Rajnandgaon	78	Mohala-Manpur (ST)	Indrashah Mandavi	INC	50,576	40.35	Kanchan Mala Bhuarya	BJP	29,528	23.56	21,048	16.79
Kanker	79	Antagarh (ST)	Anoop Nag	INC	57,061	47.53	Vikram Usendi	BJP	43,647	36.35	13,414	11.18
Kanker	80	Bhanupratappur (ST)	Manoj Singh Mandavi	INC	72,520	49.07	Deo Lal Dugga	BJP	45,827	31.01	26,693	18.06
Kanker	81	Kanker (ST)	Shishupal Shori	INC	69,053	51.25	Hira Markam	BJP	49,249	36.55	19,804	14.70
Kondagaon	82	Keshkal (ST)	Sant Ram Netam	INC	73,470	48.33	Harishankar Netam	BJP	56,498	37.17	16,972	11.16
Kondagaon	83	Kondagaon (ST)	Mohan Markam	INC	61,582	44.60	Lata Usendi	BJP	59,786	43.30	1,796	1.30
Narayanpur	84	Narayanpur (ST)	Chandan Kashyap 'E'	INC	58,652	44.34	Kedar Kashyap	BJP	56,005	42.34	2,647	2.00
Bastar	85	Bastar (ST)	Baghel Lakheshwar [E]	INC	74,378	58.01	Dr. Subhau Kashyap	BJP	40,907	31.91	33,471	26.10
Bastar	86	Jagdalpur	Rekhchand Jain [E]	INC	76,556	52.92	Santosh Bafna	BJP	49,116	33.95	27,440	18.97
Bastar	87	Chitrakot (ST)	Deepak Baij [E]	INC	62,616	46.93	Lachhuram Kashyap	BJP	44,846	33.61	17,770	13.32
Dantewada	88	Dantewara (ST)	Bhima Mandavi	BJP	37,990	33.42	Devati Karma	INC	35,818	31.51	2,172	1.91
Bijapur	89	Bijapur (ST)	Vikram Mandavi	INC	44,011	55.92	Mahesh Gagda	BJP	22,427	28.50	21,584	27.42
Sukma	90	Konta (ST)	Kawasi Lakhma	INC	31,933	35.05	Dhaniram Barse	BJP	25,224	27.68	6,709	7.37

== Bypolls (2018-2023) ==
S.No	Date	Constituency	MLA before election	Party before election	Elected MLA	Party after election
88	23 September 2019	Dantewara	Bhima Mandavi	Bharatiya Janata Party	Devati Karma	Indian National Congress
87	21 October 2019	Chitrakot	Deepak Baij	Indian National Congress	Rajman Venjam	Indian National Congress
24	3 November 2020	Marwahi	Ajit Jogi	Janta Congress Chhattisgarh	Krishna Kumar Dhruw	Indian National Congress
73	12 April 2022	Khairagarh	Devwrat Singh	Janta Congress Chhattisgarh	Yashoda Verma	Indian National Congress
80	5 December 2022	Bhanupratappur	Manoj Singh Mandavi	Indian National Congress	Savitri Manoj Mandavi	Indian National Congress

== See also ==
- Elections in Chhattisgarh
- 2018 elections in India
