= 5th Chhattisgarh Assembly =

Legislature in Chhattisgarh, India

←	4th Assembly	6th Assembly	→

Overview
- Legislative body: Chhattisgarh Legislative Assembly
- Term: 6 January 2019 – 6 January 2024
- Election: 2018 Chhattisgarh Legislative Assembly election
- Government: Bhupesh Baghel ministry
- Opposition: Bharatiya Janata Party
- Members: 90
- Leader of the House: Bhupesh Baghel
- Leader of the Opposition: Dharam Lal Kaushik (2019-2022); Narayan Chandel
- Party control: Indian National Congress

The Fifth Legislative Assembly of Chhattisgarh was constituted after the 2018 Chhattisgarh Legislative Assembly elections which were concluded in November 2018, with the results being declared on 11 December 2018. The tenure of the fifth Chhattisgarh Assembly ended on 5 January 2024.

== Members of Legislative Assembly ==
No.	Constituency	Name	Party	Alliance	Remarks
1	Bharatpur-Sonhat	Gulab Kamro	Indian National Congress	UPA	
2	Manendragarh	Dr. Vinay Jaiswal	Indian National Congress	UPA	
3	Baikunthpur	Ambika Singh Deo	Indian National Congress	UPA	
4	Premnagar	Khel Sai Singh	Indian National Congress	UPA	
5	Bhatgaon	Paras Nath Rajwade	Indian National Congress	UPA	
6	Pratappur	Dr. Prem Sai Singh Tekam	Indian National Congress	UPA	
7	Ramanujganj	Brihaspat Singh	Indian National Congress	UPA	
8	Samri	Chintamani Maharaj	Indian National Congress	UPA	
9	Lundra	Dr. Pritam Ram	Indian National Congress	UPA	
10	Ambikapur	Tribhuvaneshwar Sharan Singh Deo	Indian National Congress	UPA	
11	Sitapur	Amarjeet Bhagat	Indian National Congress	UPA	
12	Jashpur	Vinay Kumar Bhagat	Indian National Congress	UPA	
13	Kunkuri	Uttam Dhan Minj	Indian National Congress	UPA	
14	Pathalgaon	Rampukar Singh Thakur	Indian National Congress	UPA	
15	Lailunga	Chakradhar Singh Sidar	Indian National Congress	UPA	
16	Raigarh	Prakash Shakrajeet Naik	Indian National Congress	UPA	
17	Sarangarh	Uttari Ganpat Jangde	Indian National Congress	UPA	
18	Kharsia	Umesh Patel	Indian National Congress	UPA	
19	Dharamjaigarh	Laljeet Singh Rathia	Indian National Congress	UPA	
20	Rampur	Nanki Ram Kanwar	Bharatiya Janata Party	NDA	
21	Korba	Jai Singh Agrawal	Indian National Congress	UPA	
22	Katghora	Purushottam Kanwar	Indian National Congress	UPA	
23	Pali-Tanakhar	Mohit Ram	Indian National Congress	UPA	
24	Marwahi	Dr. Krishna Kumar Dhruw	Indian National Congress	UPA	Won in 2020 bypoll necessitated after the death of Ajit Jogi
25	Kota	Renu Jogi	Janta Congress Chhattisgarh	Others	
26	Lormi	Dharmjeet Singh Thakur	Janta Congress Chhattisgarh	Others	
27	Mungeli	Punnulal Mohle	Bharatiya Janata Party	NDA	
28	Takhatpur	Rashmi Ashish Singh	Indian National Congress	UPA	
29	Bilha	Dharam Lal Kaushik	Bharatiya Janata Party	NDA	
30	Bilaspur	Shailesh Pandey	Indian National Congress	UPA	
31	Beltara	Rajnish Kumar Singh	Bharatiya Janata Party	NDA	
32	Masturi	Dr. Krishna Moorti Bandhi	Bharatiya Janata Party	NDA	
33	Akaltara	Saurabh Singh	Bharatiya Janata Party	NDA	
34	Janjgir-Champa	Narayan Chandel	Bharatiya Janata Party	NDA	
35	Sakti	Charan Das Mahant	Indian National Congress	UPA	
36	Chandrapur	Ram Kumar Yadav	Indian National Congress	UPA	
37	Jaijaipur	Keshav Prasad Chandra	Bahujan Samaj Party	Others	
38	Pamgarh	Indu Banjare	Bahujan Samaj Party	Others	
39	Saraipali	Kismat Lal Nand	Indian National Congress	UPA	
40	Basna	Devendra Bahadur Singh	Indian National Congress	UPA	
41	Khallari	Dwarikadhish Yadav	Indian National Congress	UPA	
42	Mahasamund	Vinod Sevan Lal Chandrakar	Indian National Congress	UPA	
43	Bilaigarh	Chandradev Prasad Rai	Indian National Congress	UPA	
44	Kasdol	Shakuntala Sahu	Indian National Congress	UPA	
45	Baloda Bazar	Pramod Kumar Sharma	Janta Congress Chhattisgarh	Others	
46	Bhatapara	Shivratan Sharma	Bharatiya Janata Party	NDA	
47	Dharsiwa	Anita Yogendra Sharma	Indian National Congress	UPA	
48	Raipur City Gramin	Satyanarayan Sharma	Indian National Congress	UPA	
49	Raipur City West	Vikas Upadhyay	Indian National Congress	UPA	
50	Raipur City North	Kuldeep Juneja	Indian National Congress	UPA	
51	Raipur City South	Brijmohan Agrawal	Bharatiya Janata Party	NDA	
52	Arang	Dr. Shivkumar Dahariya	Indian National Congress	UPA	
53	Abhanpur	Dhanendra Sahu	Indian National Congress	UPA	
54	Rajim	Amitesh Shukla	Indian National Congress	UPA	
55	Bindrawagarh	Damarudhar Pujari	Bharatiya Janata Party	NDA	
56	Sihawa	Dr. Lakshmi Dhruw	Indian National Congress	UPA	
57	Kurud	Ajay Chandrakar	Bharatiya Janata Party	NDA	
58	Dhamtari	Ranjana Dipendra Sahu	Bharatiya Janata Party	NDA	
59	Sanjari-Balod	Sangeeta Sinha	Indian National Congress	UPA	
60	Daundi Lohara	Anila Bhediya	Indian National Congress	UPA	
61	Gunderdehi	Kunwer Singh Nishad	Indian National Congress	UPA	
62	Patan	Bhupesh Baghel	Indian National Congress	UPA	
63	Durg Gramin	Tamradhwaj Sahu	Indian National Congress	UPA	
64	Durg City	Arun Vora	Indian National Congress	UPA	
65	Bhilai Nagar	Devendra Yadav	Indian National Congress	UPA	
66	Vaishali Nagar	Vidya Ratan Bhasin	Bharatiya Janata Party	NDA	
67	Ahiwara	Guru Rudra Kumar	Indian National Congress	UPA	
68	Saja	Ravindra Choubey	Indian National Congress	UPA	
69	Bemetara	Ashish Kumar Chhabra	Indian National Congress	UPA	
70	Navagarh	Gurudayal Singh Banjare	Indian National Congress	UPA	
71	Pandariya	Mamta Chandrakar	Indian National Congress	UPA	
72	Kawardha	Mohammad Akbar	Indian National Congress	UPA	
73	Khairagarh	Yashoda Verma	Indian National Congress	UPA	Won in 2022 by-poll necessitated after the death of Devwrat Singh.
74	Dongargarh	Bhuneshwar Shobharam Baghel	Indian National Congress	UPA	
75	Rajnandgaon	Dr. Raman Singh	Bharatiya Janata Party	NDA	
76	Dongargaon	Daleshwar Sahu	Indian National Congress	UPA	
77	Khujji	Chhanni Chandu Sahu	Indian National Congress	UPA	
78	Mohla-Manpur	Indrashah Mandavi	Indian National Congress	UPA	
79	Antagarh	Anoop Nag	Indian National Congress	UPA	
80	Bhanupratappur	Manoj Singh Mandavi	Indian National Congress	UPA	
81	Kanker	Shishupal Shori	Indian National Congress	UPA	
82	Keshkal	Sant Ram Netam	Indian National Congress	UPA	
83	Kondagaon	Mohan Markam	Indian National Congress	UPA	
84	Narayanpur	Chandan Kashyap	Indian National Congress	UPA	
85	Bastar	Lakheshwar Baghel	Indian National Congress	UPA	
86	Jagdalpur	Rekhchand Jain	Indian National Congress	UPA	
87	Chitrakot	Rajman Venjam	Indian National Congress	UPA	Won in 2019 bypoll necessitated after resignation by Deepak Baij
88	Dantewada	Devati Karma	Indian National Congress	UPA	Won in 2019 bypoll necessitated after the death of Bhima Mandavi
89	Bijapur	Vikram Mandavi	Indian National Congress	UPA	
90	Konta	Kawasi Lakhma	Indian National Congress	UPA	
