= 2023 Chhattisgarh Legislative Assembly election =

Chhattisgarh Legislative Polls, 2023

- 7 and 17 November 2023

All 90 seats in the Chhattisgarh Legislative Assembly 46 seats needed for a majority
- Opinion polls
- Turnout: 76.75% (▼0.13 pp)
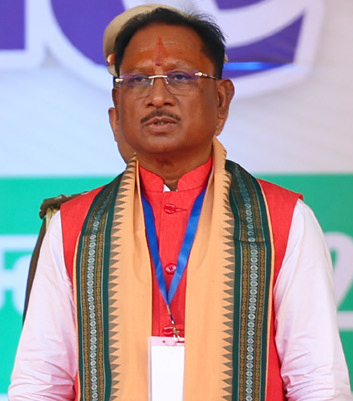

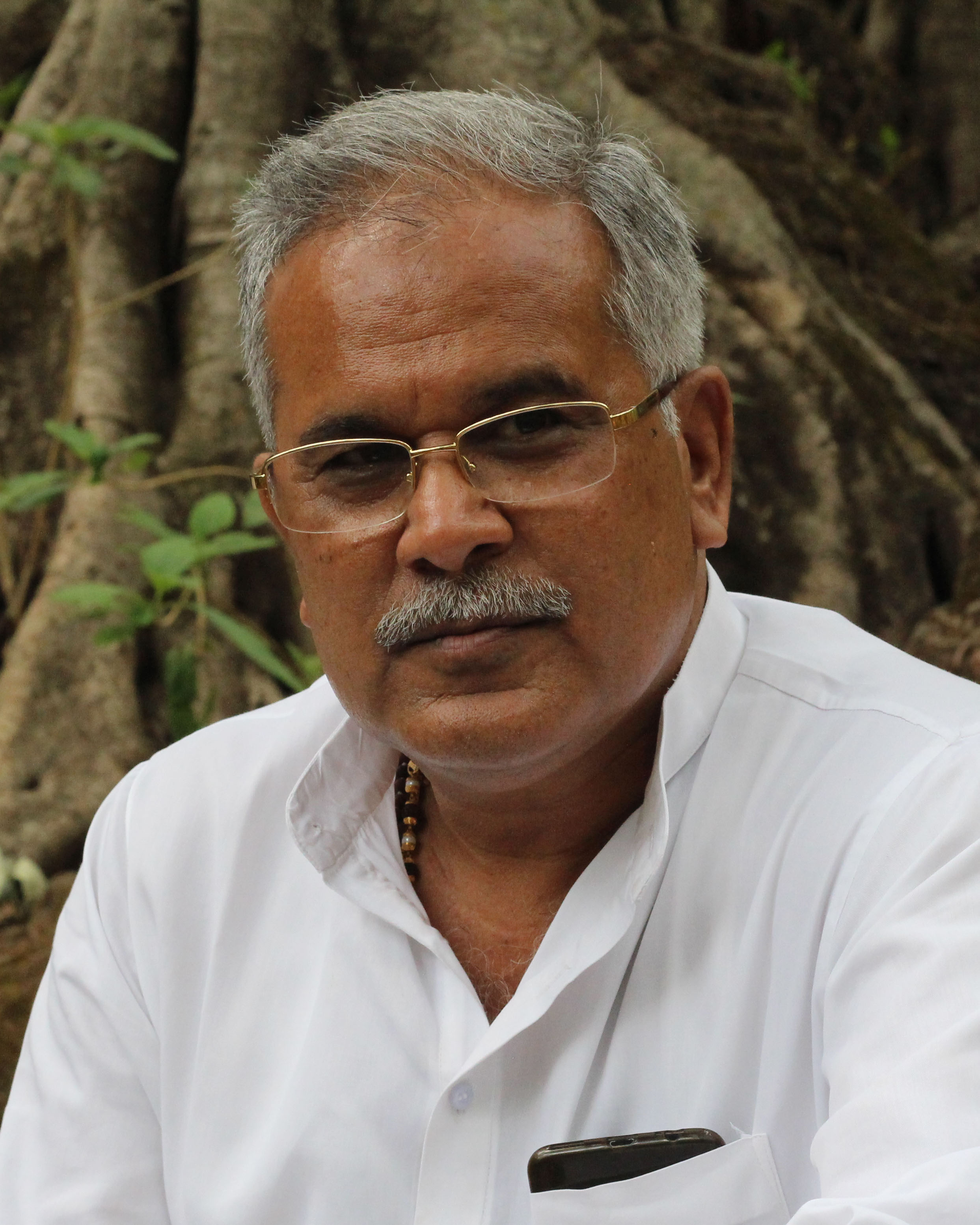
| | Majority party | Minority party |
|---|---|---|
| Leader | Vishnu Deo Sai (Note: BJP did not name any chief ministerial candidate for the election. Sai's name was announced as chief minister after the elections.) | Bhupesh Baghel |
| Party | BJP | INC |
| Leader since | 2023 | 2014 |
| Leader's seat | Kunkuri | Patan |
| Last election | 32.97% 15 seats | 43.04%, 68 seats |
| Seats won | 54 | 35 |
| Seat change | ▲39 | ▼33 |
| Popular vote | 72,34,968 | 66,02,586 |
| Percentage | 46.27% | 42.23% |
| Swing | ▲13.30 pp | ▼0.81 pp |

- Structure of the Chhattisgarh Legislative Assembly after the election

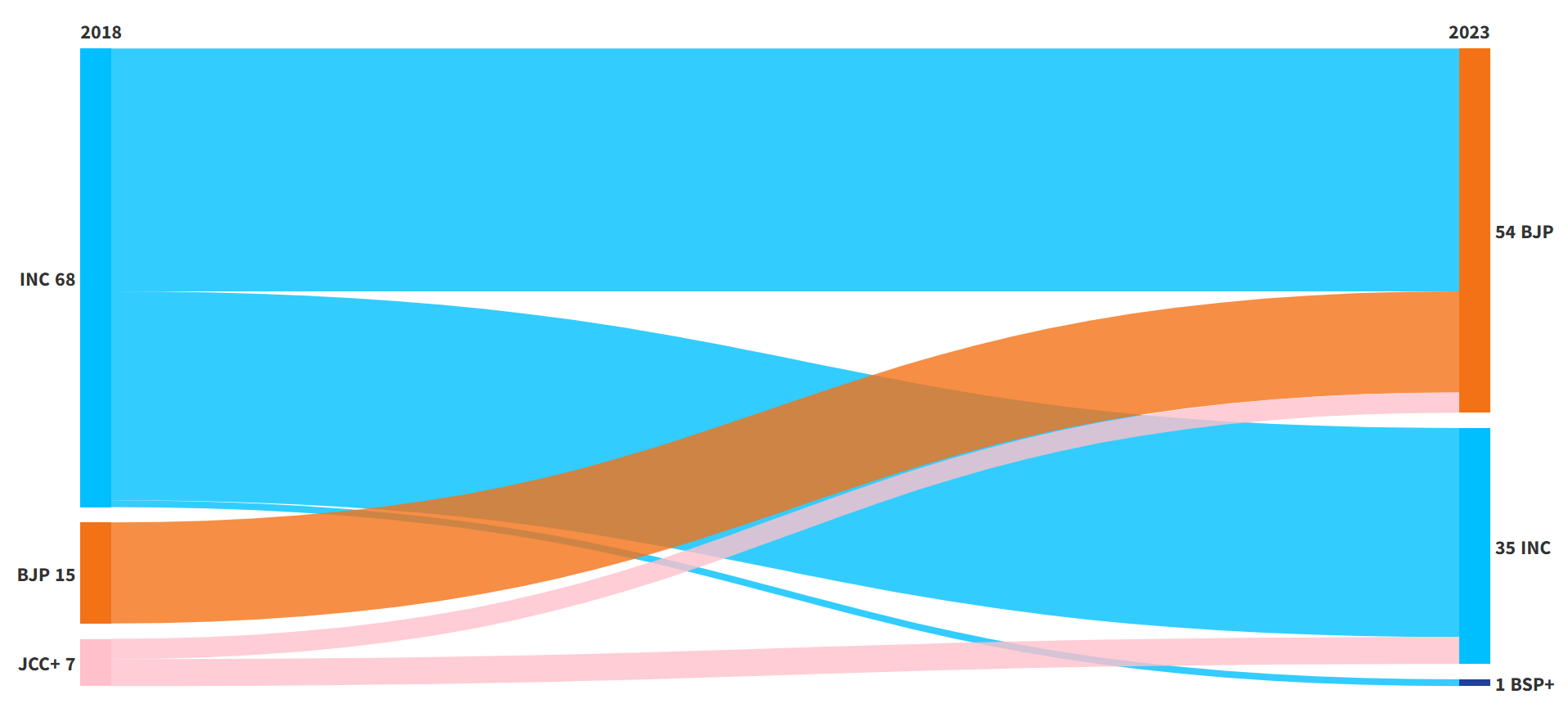
- Sankey Diagram of 2023 elections in comparision to 2018 elections
Chief Minister before election
Bhupesh Baghel
INC
Chief Minister after election
Vishnu Deo Sai
BJP

Legislative Assembly elections were held in Chhattisgarh in two phases on 7 November and 17 November 2023 to elect all 90 members of Chhattisgarh Legislative Assembly. The votes were counted and the results declared on 3 December 2023.

Defying all pollsters and predictions, the BJP won an absolute majority with 54 seats, wresting power from the INC, which had won a landslide in 2018 but could win only 35 seats. This was also the BJP's biggest win in Chhattisgarh. On 13 December, BJP leader Vishnu Deo Sai took oath as the fourth chief minister of the state.

== Background ==
The tenure of the Chhattisgarh Legislative Assembly is scheduled to end on 3 January 2024. The previous assembly elections were held in November 2018. After the election, Indian National Congress formed the state government, with Bhupesh Baghel becoming Chief Minister.

== Schedule ==
The schedule of the election was announced by the Election Commission of India on 9 October 2023.

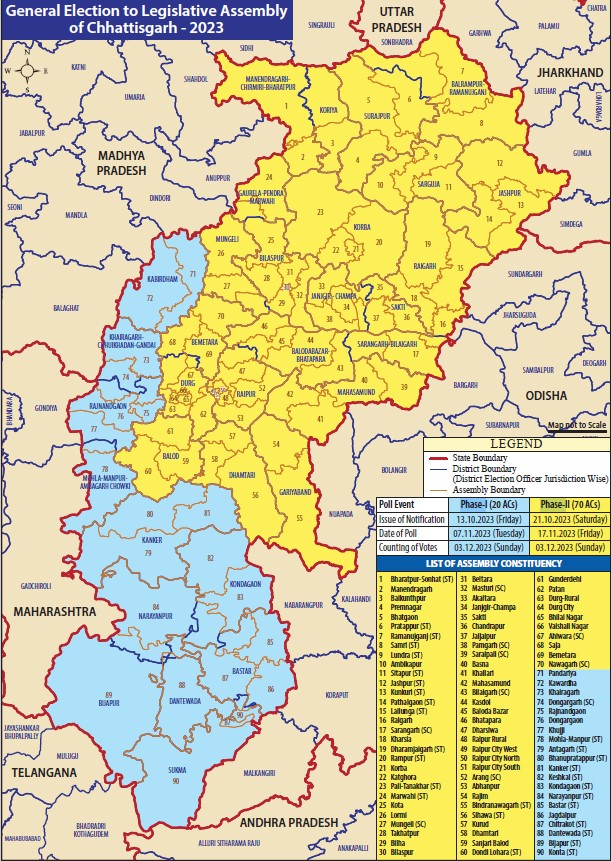
Phases of the Chhattisgarh Legislative Assembly election

| Poll event | Phase I | Phase II |
|---|---|---|
| Notification date | 13 October 2023 | 21 October 2023 |
| Start of nomination | 13 October 2023 | 21 October 2023 |
| Last date for filing nomination | 20 October 2023 | 30 October 2023 |
| Scrutiny of nomination | 21 October 2023 | 31 October 2023 |
| Last date for withdrawal of nomination | 23 October 2023 | 2 November 2023 |
| Date of poll | 7 November 2023 | 17 November 2023 |
| Date of Counting of Votes | 3 December 2023 | 3 December 2023 |

== Parties and alliances ==
| Alliance/Party | | Flag | Symbol | Leader | Seats contested | |
|---|---|---|---|---|---|---|
| Indian National Congress | | | | Bhupesh Baghel | 90 | |
| Bharatiya Janata Party | | | | Arun Sao | 90 | |
| BSP+ | Bahujan Samaj Party | | | Hemant Poyam | 58+1 | 90 |
| BSP+ | Gondwana Ganatantra Party | | | Kuldeep Prajapati | 32 | 90 |
| Janta Congress Chhattisgarh | | | | Amit Jogi | 77 | |
| Aam Aadmi Party | | | | Komal Hupendi | 53 | |
| Samajwadi Party | | | | | 22 | |
| Communist Party of India | | | | | 12 | |
| Communist Party of India (Marxist) | | | | | 3 | |
| Lok Janshakti Party (Ram Vilas) | | | | | 3 | |
| Lok Janshakti Party | | | | | 1 | |
| 44 REGISTERED (UNRECOGNISED) PARTIES | | | | | 308 | |
| INDEPENDENT | | | | | 430 | |

== Candidates ==
| District | Constituency | | | | | |
| District | Constituency | | INC | | BJP | |
| Koriya | 1 | Bharatpur-Sonhat (ST) | INC | Gulab Singh Kamro | BJP | Renuka Singh |
| Koriya | 2 | Manendragarh | INC | Ramesh Singh | BJP | Shyam Bihari Jaiswal |
| Koriya | 3 | Baikunthpur | INC | Ambika Singh Deo | BJP | Bhaiyalal Rajwade |
| Surajpur | 4 | Premnagar | INC | Khelsai Singh | BJP | Bhulan Singh Maravi |
| Surajpur | 5 | Bhatgaon | INC | Paras Nath Rajwade | BJP | Laxmi Rajwade |
| Balrampur | 6 | Pratappur (ST) | INC | Rajkumari Marawi | BJP | Shakuntala Singh Porthe |
| Balrampur | 7 | Ramanujganj (ST) | INC | Dr. Ajay Tirkey | BJP | Ramvichar Netam |
| Balrampur | 8 | Samri (ST) | INC | Vijay Paikara | BJP | Udeshwari Paikra |
| Surguja | 9 | Lundra (ST) | INC | Dr. Pritam Ram | BJP | Praboj Bhinj |
| Surguja | 10 | Ambikapur | INC | T. S. Singh Deo | BJP | Rajesh Agarwal |
| Surguja | 11 | Sitapur (ST) | INC | Amarjeet Bhagat | BJP | Ram Kumar Toppo |
| Jashpur | 12 | Jashpur (ST) | INC | Vinay Kumar Bhagat | BJP | Raimuni Bhagat |
| Jashpur | 13 | Kunkuri (ST) | INC | U D Minj | BJP | Vishnu Dev Sai |
| Jashpur | 14 | Pathalgaon (ST) | INC | Rampukar Singh | BJP | Gomati Sai |
| Raigarh | 15 | Lailunga (ST) | INC | Vidyavati Sidar | BJP | Suniti Rathia |
| Raigarh | 16 | Raigarh | INC | Prakash Shakrajeet Naik | BJP | O. P. Choudhary |
| Raigarh | 17 | Sarangarh (SC) | INC | Uttari Jangde | BJP | Shivkumari Chauhan |
| Raigarh | 18 | Kharsia | INC | Umesh Patel | BJP | Mahesh Sahu |
| Raigarh | 19 | Dharamjaigarh (ST) | INC | Laljeet Singh Rathiya | BJP | Harishchandra Rathia |
| Korba | 20 | Rampur (ST) | INC | Phool Singh Rathiya | BJP | Nankiram Kanwar |
| Korba | 21 | Korba | INC | Jai Singh Agrawal | BJP | Lakhan Lal Dewangan |
| Korba | 22 | Katghora | INC | Purshottam Kanwar | BJP | Premchand Patel |
| Korba | 23 | Pali-Tanakhar (ST) | INC | Duleshwari Sidar | BJP | Ramdaya Uikey |
| Gaurela Pendra Marwahi | 24 | Marwahi (ST) | INC | Dr. Krishna Kumar Dhruw | BJP | Pranav Kumar Marpachhi |
| Gaurela Pendra Marwahi | 25 | Kota | INC | Atal Srivastav | BJP | Prabal Pratap Singh Judev |
| Mungeli | 26 | Lormi | INC | Thaneshwar Sahu | BJP | Arun Sao |
| Mungeli | 27 | Mungeli (SC) | INC | Sanjit Banerjee | BJP | Punnulal Mohle |
| Bilaspur | 28 | Takhatpur | INC | Dr. Rashmi Ashish Singh | BJP | Dharamjeet Singh Thakur |
| Bilaspur | 29 | Bilha | INC | Siyaram Kaushik | BJP | Dharamlal Kaushik |
| Bilaspur | 30 | Bilaspur | INC | Shailesh Pandey | BJP | Amar Agrawal |
| Bilaspur | 31 | Beltara | INC | Vijay Kesarwani | BJP | Sushant Shukla |
| Bilaspur | 32 | Masturi (SC) | INC | Dilip Lahariya | BJP | Krishnamuti Bandi |
| Janjgir-Champa | 33 | Akaltara | INC | Raghvendra Singh | BJP | Saurabh Singh |
| Janjgir-Champa | 34 | Janjgir-Champa | INC | Vyas Kashyap | BJP | Narayan Chandel |
| Janjgir-Champa | 35 | Sakti | INC | Charan Das Mahant | BJP | Khilawan Sahu |
| Janjgir-Champa | 36 | Chandrapur | INC | Ram Kumar Yadav | BJP | Sanyogita Singh Judev |
| Janjgir-Champa | 37 | Jaijaipur | INC | Baleshwar Sahu | BJP | Krishnakant Chandra |
| Janjgir-Champa | 38 | Pamgarh (SC) | INC | Sheshraj Harbans | BJP | Santosh Lahre |
| Mahasamund | 39 | Saraipali (SC) | INC | Chaturi Nand | BJP | Sarla Kosaria |
| Mahasamund | 40 | Basna | INC | Devender Bahadur Singh | BJP | Sampat Agarwal |
| Mahasamund | 41 | Khallari | INC | Dwarikadhish Yadav | BJP | Alka Chandrakar |
| Mahasamund | 42 | Mahasamund | INC | Dr. Rashmi Chandrakar | BJP | Yogeshwar Raju Sinha |
| Baloda Bazar | 43 | Bilaigarh (SC) | INC | Kavita Pran Lahrey | BJP | Dineshlal Jagade |
| Baloda Bazar | 44 | Kasdol | INC | Sandeep Sahu | BJP | Dhaniram Dhivar |
| Baloda Bazar | 45 | Baloda Bazar | INC | Shailesh Trivedi | BJP | Tank Ram Verma |
| Baloda Bazar | 46 | Bhatapara | INC | Inder Kumar Sao | BJP | Shivratan Sharma |
| Raipur | 47 | Dharsiwa | INC | Chhaya Verma | BJP | Anuj Sharma |
| Raipur | 48 | Raipur City Gramin | INC | Pankaj Sharma | BJP | Motilal Sahu |
| Raipur | 49 | Raipur City West | INC | Vikas Upadhyay | BJP | Rajesh Munat |
| Raipur | 50 | Raipur City North | INC | Kuldeep Juneja | BJP | Purandar Mishra |
| Raipur | 51 | Raipur City South | INC | Mahant Ram Sundar Das | BJP | Brijmohan Agrawal |
| Raipur | 52 | Arang (SC) | INC | Shivkumar Dahariya | BJP | Guru Khushwant Saheb |
| Raipur | 53 | Abhanpur | INC | Dhanendra Sahu | BJP | Indra Kumar Sahu |
| Gariaband | 54 | Rajim | INC | Amitesh Shukla | BJP | Rohit Sahu |
| Gariaband | 55 | Bindrawagarh (ST) | INC | Janak Lal Dhruv | BJP | Govardhan Ram Manjhi |
| Dhamtari | 56 | Sihawa (ST) | INC | Ambika Markam | BJP | Shrawan Markam |
| Dhamtari | 57 | Kurud | INC | Tarini Chandrakar | BJP | Ajay Chandrakar |
| Dhamtari | 58 | Dhamtari | INC | Omkar Sahu | BJP | Ranjana Sahu |
| Balod | 59 | Sanjari-Balod | INC | Sangeeta Sinha | BJP | Rakesh Yadav |
| Balod | 60 | Dondi Lohara (ST) | INC | Anila Bhediya | BJP | Devlal Halwa Thakur |
| Balod | 61 | Gunderdehi | INC | Kunwar Singh Nishad | BJP | Virendra Sahu |
| Durg | 62 | Patan | INC | Bhupesh Baghel | BJP | Vijay Baghel |
| Durg | 63 | Durg Gramin | INC | Tamradhwaj Sahu | BJP | Lalit Chandrakar |
| Durg | 64 | Durg City | INC | Arun Vora | BJP | Gajendra Yadav |
| Durg | 65 | Bhilai Nagar | INC | Devender Singh Yadav | BJP | Prem Prakash Pandey |
| Durg | 66 | Vaishali Nagar | INC | Mukesh Chandrakar | BJP | Rikesh Sen |
| Durg | 67 | Ahiwara (SC) | INC | Nirmal Kosare | BJP | Doman Korsevada |
| Bemetara | 68 | Saja | INC | Ravindra Choubey | BJP | Ishwar Sahu |
| Bemetara | 69 | Bemetara | INC | Ashish Kumar Chhabra | BJP | Dipesh Sahu |
| Bemetara | 70 | Navagarh (SC) | INC | Guru Rudra Kumar | BJP | Dayaldas Baghel |
| Kabirdham | 71 | Pandariya | INC | Neelkanth Chandravanshi | BJP | Bhawna Bohra |
| Kabirdham | 72 | Kawardha | INC | Mohammad Akbar | BJP | Vijay Sharma |
| Rajnandgaon | 73 | Khairagarh | INC | Yashoda Verma | BJP | Vikrant Singh |
| Rajnandgaon | 74 | Dongargarh (SC) | INC | Harshita Swami Baghel | BJP | Vinod Khandekar |
| Rajnandgaon | 75 | Rajnandgaon | INC | Girish Devangan | BJP | Raman Singh |
| Rajnandgaon | 76 | Dongargaon | INC | Daleshwar Sahu | BJP | Bharat Verma |
| Rajnandgaon | 77 | Khujji | INC | Bhola Ram Sahu | BJP | Geeta Ghasi Sahu |
| Rajnandgaon | 78 | Mohla-Manpur (ST) | INC | Indrashah Mandavi | BJP | Sanjeev Saha |
| Kanker | 79 | Antagarh (ST) | INC | Roop Singh Potai | BJP | Vikram Usendi |
| Kanker | 80 | Bhanupratappur (ST) | INC | Savitri Mandavi | BJP | Gautam Uikey |
| Kanker | 81 | Kanker (ST) | INC | Shankar Dhurve | BJP | Asharam Netam |
| Kondagaon | 82 | Keshkal (ST) | INC | Sant Ram Netam | BJP | Neelkanth Tekam |
| Kondagaon | 83 | Kondagaon (ST) | INC | Mohan Markam | BJP | Lata Usendi |
| Narayanpur | 84 | Narayanpur (ST) | INC | Chandan Kashyap | BJP | Kedar Nath Kashyap |
| Bastar | 85 | Bastar (ST) | INC | Lakheshwar Baghel | BJP | Maniram Kashyap |
| Bastar | 86 | Jagdalpur | INC | Jitin Jaiswal | BJP | Kiran Singh Deo |
| Bastar | 87 | Chitrakot (ST) | INC | Deepak Baij | BJP | Vinayak Goyal |
| Dantewada | 88 | Dantewada (ST) | INC | Chavindra Mahendra Karma | BJP | Chetaram Arami |
| Bijapur | 89 | Bijapur (ST) | INC | Vikram Mandavi | BJP | Mahesh Gagada |
| Sukma | 90 | Konta (ST) | INC | Kawasi Lakhma | BJP | Soyam Muka |

== Campaigns ==
=== Indian National Congress ===
The Indian National Congress (INC) campaigned slogan using "Fir se Congress layenge" (will bring congress again). The party's manifesto promised to continue and expand its existing welfare schemes, such as the Rajiv Gandhi Kisan Nyay Yojana (RGKNY), which provides financial assistance to farmers, and the Narva, Garva, Ghurva, Badi Yojana, which is a rural development program.

Chief Minister Bhupesh Baghel, who addressed rallies and public meetings across the state. Baghel highlighted the party's achievements in government, such as the implementation of the RGKNY, the reduction in poverty, and the improvement in law and order. He also promised to continue working for the development of the state if the INC was re-electedThe INC also targeted the Bharatiya Janata Party (BJP), the main opposition party in the state. Baghel accused the BJP of being anti-farmer and anti-poor, and of failing to develop the state when it was in power. He also criticized the BJP's central government for its policies, such as demonetization and GST, which he said had hurt the state's economy. The INC also targeted the BJP by using Adani in their campaign.

Manifesto

=== Bharatiya Janata Party ===
The party's manifesto, titled "Modi's Guarantee for Chhattisgarh 2023," promised to create one lakh new jobs, provide free electricity to farmers, and increase the minimum support price for paddy to ₹3,100 per quintal. The BJP Chhattisgarh also promised to improve infrastructure, healthcare, and education in the state.

The BJP's campaign was led by Union Home Minister Amit Shah, who addressed rallies across the state. Shah attacked the incumbent Congress government over alleged corruption, lawlessness, and the neglect of farmers and tribals. He also accused the Congress of promoting religious conversion and appeasement politics. Other senior BJP leaders who campaigned in Chhattisgarh included former Chief Minister Raman Singh, Union Minister Bhupender Yadav, and party spokesperson Sambit Patra. They assured on the BJP's development record and the party's commitment to Hindutva.

The BJP also targeted the Congress government on the issue of Naxalism. The party alleged that the Congress was soft on Naxalites and that the state had witnessed an increase in Naxal violence in recent years.

Manifesto

== Security concerns ==
Chhattisgarh has historicaly been part of India's red corridor, a hotspot for Naxalite–Maoist insurgency. To ensure a secure polling process, over 60,000 security personnel, mostly from the Central Armed Police Forces (CAPFs) were deployed to 12 constituencies in the Bastar region. In total 20 constituencies saw the deployment of security forces.

In mid-afternoon on 7 November, the date of polling for the first phase, security personnel were injured in a gunfight in the southern villages of Tadmetla and Duled.

On 17 November, during the second phase of the elections, a Naxal IED blast occurred, resulting in the death of Indo-Tibetan Border Police Head Constable Joginder Singh when the Electronic Voting Machine was being returned to Gariaband from the polling stations of Bade and Gobra. The EVM was undamaged according to the Inspector-General of the Raipur Range, Arif Sheikh.

== Surveys and polls ==
=== Opinion polls ===
Seat share
| Polling agency | Date published | Margin of error | Sample Size | | | | Majority |
| Polling agency | Date published | Margin of error | Sample Size | INC | BJP | Others | Majority |
| ABP News-Matrize | 26 March 2023 | ±3% | 27,000 | 47-52 | 34-39 | 1-5 | INC |
| ABP News-C-Voter | 20 August 2023 | ±3–5% | 7,696 | 48-54 | 35-41 | 0-3 | INC |
| ABP News-CVoter | 9 October 2023 | ±3–5% | 11,928 | 45-55 | 39-45 | 0-2 | Hung |
| ABP News-CVoter | 4 November 2023 | ±3–5% | 5,782 | 45-51 | 36-42 | 2-5 | Hung |

Vote share
| Polling agency | Date published | Margin of error | Sample Size | | | | Lead |
| Polling agency | Date published | Margin of error | Sample Size | INC | BJP | Others | Lead |
| ABP News-Matrize | 26 March 2023 | ±3% | 27,000 | 44% | 43% | 13% | 1% |
| ABP News-CVoter | 20 August 2023 | ±3–5% | 7,696 | 46% | 41% | 13% | 5% |
| ABP News-CVoter | 9 October 2023 | ±3–5% | 11,928 | 45.3% | 43.5% | 11.2% | 1.8% |
| ABP News-CVoter | 4 November 2023 | ±3–5% | 5,782 | 44.8% | 42.7% | 12.5% | 2.1% |

=== Exit polls ===
Exit polls were released on 30 November 2023. All exit polls incorrectly predicted the Congress to win, or at least become the single largest party in a hung assembly. Thus the exit polls turned out to be a failure, as BJP won the election with clear majority.

| Polling agency | | | | Majority |
| Polling agency | INC | BJP | Others | Majority |
| India Today-Axis My India | 40-50 | 36-46 | 1-5 | Hung |
| India TV-CNX | 46-56 | 30-40 | 3-5 | INC |
| TV9 Bharatvarsh-Polstrat | 40-50 | 35-45 | 0-3 | Hung |
| ABP News-CVoter | 41-53 | 36-48 | 0-3 | Hung |
| News18-Today's Chanakya | 49-65 | 25-41 | 0-3 | INC |
| People's Insight | 23 | 67 | 0 | BJP |
| Republic TV-Matrize | 44-52 | 34-42 | 0-2 | Hung |
| Dainik Bhaskar | 46-55 | 35-45 | 0-10 | INC |
| Times Now-ETG | 48-56 | 32-40 | 2-4 | INC |
| Jan Ki Baat | 42-53 | 34-45 | 3 | Hung |
| Poll of Polls | 49 | 38 | 3 | INC |
| Actual Results | 35 | 54 | 1 | BJP |

== Results ==
=== Results by party ===
Vote share by party
1. Bharatiya Janata Party (46.3%)
2. Indian National Congress (42.2%)
3. Bahujan Samaj Party (2.05%)
4. NOTA (1.26%)
5. Others (8.19%)
Seat share by party
1. Bharatiya Janata Party (60.0%)
2. Indian National Congress (38.9%)
3. Gondwana Ganatantra Party (1.11%)

| Party | Popular vote | | | Seats | | |
| Party | Votes | % | ±pp | Contested | Won | +/− |
|---|---|---|---|---|---|---|
| BJP | 7,234,968 | 46.27 | ▲13.30 | 90 | 54 | ▲39 |
| INC | 6,602,586 | 42.23 | ▼0.81 | 90 | 35 | ▼33 |
| BSP | 319,903 | 2.05 | ▼1.85 | 58 | 0 | ▼2 |
| Other parties | 858,568 | 5.49 | ▼2.11 | 513 | 1 | ▼4 |
| IND | 421,430 | 2.70 | ▼3.18 | 430 | 0 | Steady |
| NOTA | 197,678 | 1.26 | ▼0.72 | | | |
| Total | 15,634,933 | 100% | - | 1181 | 90 | - |
Vote statistics
| Valid votes | 15,634,933 | 99.80 | | | | |
| Invalid votes | 31,611 | 0.20 | | | | |
| Votes cast/ turnout | 15,666,544 | 76.75 | | | | |
| Abstentions | 4,746,263 | 23.25 | | | | |
| Registered voters | 20,412,807 | | | | | |

=== Results by district ===
| Divisions | Seats | | | |
| Divisions | Seats | BJP | INC | OTH |
| Manendragarh-Chirmiri-Bharatpur | 2 | 2 | —N/a | —N/a |
| Koriya | 1 | 1 | —N/a | —N/a |
| Surajpur | 2 | 2 | —N/a | —N/a |
| Balrampur | 3 | 3 | —N/a | —N/a |
| Surguja | 3 | 3 | —N/a | —N/a |
| Jashpur | 3 | 3 | —N/a | —N/a |
| Raigarh | 3 | 1 | 2 | —N/a |
| Sarangarh-Bilaigarh | 3 | —N/a | 3 | —N/a |
| Korba | 4 | 2 | 1 | 1 |
| Gaurella-Pendra-Marwahi | 2 | 1 | 1 | —N/a |
| Mungeli | 2 | 2 | —N/a | —N/a |
| Janjgir-Champa | 3 | —N/a | 3 | —N/a |
| Sakti | 3 | —N/a | 3 | —N/a |
| Bilaspur | 5 | 4 | 1 | —N/a |
| Mahasamund | 4 | 2 | 2 | —N/a |
| Baloda Bazar | 3 | 1 | 2 | —N/a |
| Raipur | 7 | 7 | —N/a | —N/a |
| Gariaband | 2 | 1 | 1 | —N/a |
| Dhamtari | 3 | 1 | 2 | —N/a |
| Balod | 3 | —N/a | 3 | —N/a |
| Durg | 6 | 4 | 2 | —N/a |
| Bemetara | 3 | 3 | —N/a | —N/a |
| Kabirdham | 2 | 2 | —N/a | —N/a |
| Khairagarh-Chhuikhadan-Gandai | 1 | —N/a | 1 | —N/a |
| Rajnandgaon | 4 | 1 | 3 | —N/a |
| Mohla-Manpur-Ambagarh Chowki | 1 | —N/a | 1 | —N/a |
| Kanker | 3 | 2 | 1 | —N/a |
| Kondagaon | 2 | 2 | —N/a | —N/a |
| Narayanpur | 1 | 1 | —N/a | —N/a |
| Bastar | 3 | 2 | 1 | —N/a |
| Dantewada | 1 | 1 | —N/a | —N/a |
| Bijapur | 1 | —N/a | 1 | —N/a |
| Sukma | 1 | —N/a | 1 | —N/a |
| Total | 90 | 54 | 35 | 1 |

=== Results by constituency ===
| District | Constituency | | Winner | | | | Runner-up | | | | Margin |
| District | # | Name | Candidate | Party | Votes | % | Candidate | Party | Votes | % | Margin |
|---|---|---|---|---|---|---|---|---|---|---|---|
| Manendragarh-Chirmiri-Bharatpur | 1 | Bharatpur-Sonhat (ST) | Renuka Singh | BJP | 55,809 | 37.54 | Gulab Kamro | INC | 50,890 | 34.23 | 4,919 |
| Manendragarh-Chirmiri-Bharatpur | 2 | Manendragarh | Shyam Bihari Jaiswal | BJP | 48,503 | 48.19 | Ramesh Singh Vakil | INC | 36,623 | 36.39 | 11,880 |
| Koriya | 3 | Baikunthpur | Bhaiyalal Rajwade | BJP | 66,866 | 48.21 | Ambika Singh Deo | INC | 41,453 | 29.89 | 25,413 |
| Surajpur | 4 | Premnagar | Bhulan Singh Marabi | BJP | 99,957 | 51.87 | Khelsai Singh | INC | 66,667 | 34.59 | 33,290 |
| Surajpur | 5 | Bhatgaon | Laxmi Rajwade | BJP | 105,162 | 54.06 | Paras Nath Rajwade | INC | 61,200 | 31.46 | 43,962 |
| Balrampur | 6 | Pratappur (ST) | Shakuntala Singh Portey | BJP | 83,796 | 43.59 | Rajkumari Shivbhajan Marabi | INC | 72,088 | 37.50 | 11,708 |
| Balrampur | 7 | Ramanujganj (ST) | Ramvichar Netam | BJP | 99,574 | 54.58 | Ajay Kumar Tirkey | INC | 69,911 | 38.32 | 29,663 |
| Balrampur | 8 | Samri (ST) | Uddheshwari Paikra | BJP | 83,483 | 45.53 | Vijay Paikra | INC | 69,540 | 37.93 | 13,943 |
| Surguja | 9 | Lundra (ST) | Prabodh Minz | BJP | 87,463 | 52.82 | Pritam Ram | INC | 63,335 | 38.25 | 24,128 |
| Surguja | 10 | Ambikapur | Rajesh Agrawal | BJP | 90,780 | 46.34 | T. S. Singh Deo | INC | 90,686 | 46.29 | 94 |
| Surguja | 11 | Sitapur (ST) | Ramkumar Toppo | BJP | 83,088 | 50.36 | Amarjeet Bhagat | INC | 65,928 | 39.96 | 17,160 |
| Jashpur | 12 | Jashpur (ST) | Raymuni Bhagat | BJP | 89,103 | 49.21 | Vinay Bhagat | INC | 71,458 | 39.47 | 17,645 |
| Jashpur | 13 | Kunkuri (ST) | Vishnu Deo Sai | BJP | 87,607 | 54.90 | U. D. Minj | INC | 62,063 | 38.90 | 25,544 |
| Jashpur | 14 | Pathalgaon (ST) | Gomati Sai | BJP | 82,320 | 45.87 | Rampukar Singh Thakur | INC | 82,065 | 45.75 | 255 |
| Raigarh | 15 | Lailunga (ST) | Vidyawati Sidar | INC | 84,666 | 48.20 | Suniti Satyanand Rathiya | BJP | 80,490 | 45.82 | 4,176 |
| Raigarh | 16 | Raigarh | O. P. Choudhary | BJP | 129,134 | 63.21 | Prakash Shakrajeet Naik | INC | 64,691 | 31.66 | 64,443 |
| Sarangarh-Bilaigarh | 17 | Sarangarh (SC) | Uttari Ganpat Jangde | INC | 109,484 | 52.15 | Shivkumari Saradhan Chouhan | BJP | 79,789 | 38.01 | 29,695 |
| Sarangarh-Bilaigarh | 18 | Kharsia | Umesh Patel | INC | 100,988 | 53.74 | Mahesh Sahu | BJP | 79,332 | 42.22 | 21,656 |
| Raigarh | 19 | Dharamjaigarh (ST) | Laljeet Singh Rathia | INC | 90,493 | 49.18 | Harishchandra Rathia | BJP | 80,856 | 43.94 | 9,637 |
| Korba | 20 | Rampur (ST) | Phool Singh Rathiya | INC | 93,647 | 53.11 | Nanki Ram Kanwar | BJP | 70,788 | 40.14 | 22,859 |
| Korba | 21 | Korba | Lakhan Lal Dewangan | BJP | 92,029 | 53.74 | Jai Singh Agrawal | INC | 66,400 | 38.77 | 25,629 |
| Korba | 22 | Katghora | Premchand Patel | BJP | 73,680 | 45.19 | Purushottam Kanwar | INC | 56,780 | 34.83 | 16,900 |
| Korba | 23 | Pali-Tanakhar (ST) | Tuleshwar Markam | GGP | 60,862 | 32.87 | Duleshwari Sidar | INC | 60,148 | 32.48 | 714 |
| Gaurela-Pendra-Marwahi | 24 | Marwahi (ST) | Pranav Kumar Marpachi | BJP | 51,960 | 33.35 | Gulab Raj | JCC | 39,882 | 25.60 | 12,078 |
| Gaurela-Pendra-Marwahi | 25 | Kota | Atal Shrivastava | INC | 73,479 | 44.95 | Prabal Pratap Singh Judev | BJP | 65,522 | 40.08 | 7,957 |
| Mungeli | 26 | Lormi | Arun Sao | BJP | 75,070 | 47.80 | Thaneshwar Sahu | INC | 29,179 | 18.58 | 45,891 |
| Mungeli | 27 | Mungeli (SC) | Punnulal Mohle | BJP | 85,429 | 49.72 | Sanjit Banerjee | INC | 73,648 | 42.86 | 11,781 |
| Bilaspur | 28 | Takhatpur | Dharmjeet Singh Thakur | BJP | 90,978 | 50.58 | Dr.Rashmi Ashish Singh | INC | 76,086 | 42.30 | 14,892 |
| Bilaspur | 29 | Bilha | Dharamlal Kaushik | BJP | 100,346 | 46.93 | Siyaram Kaushik | INC | 91,389 | 42.74 | 8,957 |
| Bilaspur | 30 | Bilaspur | Amar Agrawal | BJP | 83,022 | 57.94 | Shailesh Pandey | INC | 54,063 | 37.73 | 28,959 |
| Bilaspur | 31 | Beltara | Sushant Shukla | BJP | 79,528 | 48.28 | Vijay Kesarwani | INC | 62,565 | 37.98 | 16,963 |
| Bilaspur | 32 | Masturi (SC) | Dilip Lahariya | INC | 95,497 | 46.79 | Dr. Krishnamurti Bandi | BJP | 75,356 | 36.92 | 20,141 |
| Janjgir–Champa | 33 | Akaltara | Raghavendra Kumar Singh | INC | 80,043 | 47.05 | Saurabh Singh | BJP | 57,285 | 33.67 | 22,758 |
| Janjgir–Champa | 34 | Janjgir-Champa | Vyas Kashyap | INC | 72,900 | 45.62 | Narayan Chandel | BJP | 65,929 | 41.26 | 6,971 |
| Sakti | 35 | Sakti | Charan Das Mahant | INC | 81,519 | 50.56 | Dr. Khilawan Sahu | BJP | 69,124 | 42.88 | 12,395 |
| Sakti | 36 | Chandrapur | Ram Kumar Yadav | INC | 85,525 | 48.48 | Bahurani Judev | BJP | 69,549 | 39.42 | 15,976 |
| Sakti | 37 | Jaijaipur | Baleshwar Sahu | INC | 76,747 | 44.04 | Krishna Kant Chandra | BJP | 50,825 | 29.16 | 25,922 |
| Janjgir–Champa | 38 | Pamgarh (SC) | Sheshraj Harvansh | INC | 63,963 | 42.80 | Santosh Lahre | BJP | 47,789 | 31.98 | 16,174 |
| Mahasamund | 39 | Saraipali (SC) | Chaturi Nand | INC | 100,503 | 50.57 | Sarla Kosariya | BJP | 58,615 | 34.74 | 41,888 |
| Mahasamund | 40 | Basna | Sampat Agrawal | BJP | 108,871 | 57.80 | Devender Bahadur Singh | INC | 72,078 | 38.27 | 36,793 |
| Mahasamund | 41 | Khallari | Dwarikadhish Yadav | INC | 104,052 | 57.86 | Alka Chandrakar | BJP | 66,933 | 37.22 | 37,119 |
| Mahasamund | 42 | Mahasamund | Yogeshwar Raju Sinha | BJP | 84,594 | 51.41 | Dr. Rashmi Chandrakar | INC | 68,442 | 41.60 | 16,152 |
| Sarangarh-Bilaigarh | 43 | Bilaigarh (SC) | Kavita Pran Lahrey | INC | 81,647 | 37.92 | Dr. Dineshlal Jagade | BJP | 63,708 | 29.59 | 17,939 |
| Baloda Bazar | 44 | Kasdol | Sandeep Sahu | INC | 136,362 | 50.71 | Dhaniram Dhivar | BJP | 102,597 | 37.78 | 33,765 |
| Baloda Bazar | 45 | Baloda Bazar | Tank Ram Verma | BJP | 108,381 | 49.34 | Shailesh Trivedi | INC | 93,635 | 42.63 | 14,746 |
| Baloda Bazar | 46 | Bhatapara | Inder Kumar Sao | INC | 94,066 | 49.01 | Shivratan Sharma | BJP | 82,750 | 43.11 | 11,316 |
| Raipur | 47 | Dharsiwa | Anuj Sharma | BJP | 107,283 | 58.65 | Chhaya Verma | INC | 62,940 | 34.41 | 44,343 |
| Raipur | 48 | Raipur City Gramin | Motilal Sahu | BJP | 113,032 | 54.98 | Pankaj Sharma | INC | 77,282 | 37.59 | 35,750 |
| Raipur | 49 | Raipur City West | Rajesh Munat | BJP | 98,938 | 60.35 | Vikas Upadhyay | INC | 57,709 | 35.20 | 41,229 |
| Raipur | 50 | Raipur City North | Purandar Mishra | BJP | 54,279 | 48.26 | Kuldeep Singh Juneja | INC | 31,225 | 27.76 | 23,054 |
| Raipur | 51 | Raipur City South | Brijmohan Agrawal | BJP | 109,263 | 69.48 | Mahant Ramsundar Das | INC | 41,544 | 26.42 | 67,719 |
| Raipur | 52 | Arang | Guru Khushwant Saheb | BJP | 94,039 | 52.59 | Dr. Shivkumar Dahariya | INC | 77,501 | 43.34 | 16,538 |
| Raipur | 53 | Abhanpur | Indra Kumar Sahu | BJP | 93,295 | 52.00 | Dhanendra Sahu | INC | 77,742 | 43.33 | 15,553 |
| Gariaband | 54 | Rajim | Rohit Sahu | BJP | 96,423 | 50.16 | Amitesh Shukla | INC | 84,512 | 43.96 | 11,911 |
| Gariaband | 55 | Bindrawagarh (ST) | Janak Dhruw | INC | 92,639 | 47.48 | Gowardhan Singh Manjhi | BJP | 91,823 | 47.06 | 816 |
| Dhamtari | 56 | Sihawa (ST) | Ambika Markam | INC | 84,891 | 49.81 | Shrawan Markam | BJP | 71,725 | 42.08 | 13,166 |
| Dhamtari | 57 | Kurud | Ajay Chandrakar | BJP | 94,712 | 50.07 | Tarni Neelam Chandrakar | INC | 86,622 | 45.79 | 8,090 |
| Dhamtari | 58 | Dhamtari | Onkar Sahu | INC | 88,544 | 48.44 | Rajana Dipendra Sahu | BJP | 85,938 | 47.02 | 2,606 |
| Balod | 59 | Sanjari-Balod | Sangeeta Sinha | INC | 84,649 | 44.20 | Rakesh Kumar Yadav | BJP | 67,603 | 35.30 | 17,046 |
| Balod | 60 | Dondi Lohara (ST) | Anila Bhendiya | INC | 102,762 | 56.43 | Devlal Thakur | BJP | 67,183 | 36.89 | 35,579 |
| Balod | 61 | Gunderdehi | Kunwer Singh Nishad | INC | 103,191 | 50.35 | Virendra Sahu | BJP | 88,328 | 43.10 | 14,863 |
| Durg | 62 | Patan | Bhupesh Baghel | INC | 95,438 | 51.91 | Vijay Baghel | BJP | 75,715 | 41.18 | 19,723 |
| Durg | 63 | Durg Gramin | Lalit Chandrakar | BJP | 87,175 | 52.52 | Tamradhwaj Sahu | INC | 70,533 | 42.50 | 16,642 |
| Durg | 64 | Durg City | Gajendra Yadav | BJP | 97,906 | 63.89 | Arun Vora | INC | 49,209 | 32.11 | 48,697 |
| Durg | 65 | Bhilai Nagar | Devendra Yadav | INC | 54,405 | 48.47 | Prem Prakash Pandey | BJP | 53,141 | 47.34 | 1,264 |
| Durg | 66 | Vaishali Nagar | Rikesh Sen | BJP | 98,272 | 59.45 | Mukesh Chandrakar | INC | 58,198 | 35.21 | 40,074 |
| Durg | 67 | Ahiwara (SC) | Domanlal Korsewada | BJP | 96,717 | 54.65 | Nirmal Korse | INC | 71,454 | 40.38 | 25,263 |
| Bemetara | 68 | Saja | Ishwar Sahu | BJP | 101,789 | 48.55 | Ravindra Choubey | INC | 96,593 | 46.07 | 5,196 |
| Bemetara | 69 | Bemetara | Dipesh Sahu | BJP | 97,731 | 49.60 | Ashish Chhabda | INC | 88,597 | 44.97 | 9,134 |
| Bemetara | 70 | Navagarh (SC) | Dayaldas Baghel | BJP | 101,631 | 50.01 | Guru Rudra Kumar | INC | 86,454 | 42.54 | 15,177 |
| Kabirdham | 71 | Pandariya | Bhawna Bohra | BJP | 120,847 | 50.66 | Neelu Chandravanshi | INC | 94,449 | 39.59 | 26,398 |
| Kabirdham | 72 | Kawardha | Vijay Sharma | BJP | 144,257 | 53.22 | Mohammad Akbar | INC | 104,665 | 38.62 | 39,592 |
| Khairagarh-Chhuikhadan-Gandai | 73 | Khairagarh | Yashoda Verma | INC | 89,704 | 49.26 | Vikrant Singh | BJP | 84,070 | 46.16 | 5,634 |
| Rajnandgaon | 74 | Dongargarh (SC) | Harshita Swami Baghel | INC | 89,145 | 51.59 | Vinod Khandekar | BJP | 74,778 | 43.27 | 14,367 |
| Rajnandgaon | 75 | Rajnandgaon | Raman Singh | BJP | 102,499 | 61.21 | Girish Dewangan | INC | 57,415 | 34.29 | 45,084 |
| Rajnandgaon | 76 | Dongargaon | Daleshwar Sahu | INC | 81,479 | 47.49 | Bharatlal Verma | BJP | 78,690 | 45.86 | 2,789 |
| Rajnandgaon | 77 | Khujji | Bholaram Sahu | INC | 80,465 | 50.64 | Geeta Ghasi Sahu | BJP | 54,521 | 34.31 | 25,944 |
| Mohla-Manpur-Ambagarh Chowki | 78 | Mohla-Manpur | Indrashah Mandavi | INC | 77,454 | 57.79 | Sanjeev Shah | BJP | 45,713 | 34.11 | 31,741 |
| Kanker | 79 | Antagarh (ST) | Vikram Usendi | BJP | 59,547 | 42.21 | Roop Singh Potai | INC | 35,837 | 25.40 | 23,710 |
| Kanker | 80 | Bhanupratappur (ST) | Savitri Manoj Mandavi | INC | 83,931 | 50.63 | Gautam Uikey | BJP | 52,999 | 31.97 | 30,932 |
| Kanker | 81 | Kanker (ST) | Asharam Netam | BJP | 67,980 | 45.57 | Shankar Dhruv | INC | 67,964 | 45.56 | 16 |
| Kondagaon | 82 | Keshkal (ST) | Neelkanth Tekam | BJP | 77,438 | 45.39 | Sant Ram Netam | INC | 71,878 | 42.13 | 5,560 |
| Kondagaon | 83 | Kondagaon (ST) | Lata Usendi | BJP | 80,465 | 51.32 | Mohan Lal Markam | INC | 61,893 | 39.47 | 18,572 |
| Narayanpur | 84 | Narayanpur (ST) | Kedar Nath Kashyap | BJP | 69,110 | 48.22 | Chandan Kashyap | INC | 49,580 | 34.76 | 19,188 |
| Bastar | 85 | Bastar (ST) | Lakheshwar Baghel | INC | 68,401 | 47.92 | Maniram Kashyap | BJP | 61,967 | 43.41 | 6,434 |
| Bastar | 86 | Jagdalpur | Kiran Singh Deo | BJP | 90,336 | 55.46 | Jitin Jaiswal | INC | 60,502 | 37.14 | 29,834 |
| Bastar | 87 | Chitrakot (ST) | Vinayak Goyal | BJP | 63,954 | 43.73 | Deepak Bajj | INC | 55,584 | 38.01 | 8,370 |
| Dantewada | 88 | Dantewada (ST) | Chaitram Atami | BJP | 57,739 | 42.92 | K. Chavindra Mahendra Karma | INC | 40,936 | 30.43 | 16,803 |
| Bijapur | 89 | Bijapur (ST) | Vikram Mandavi | INC | 35,739 | 43.84 | Mahesh Gagda | BJP | 33,033 | 40.52 | 2,706 |
| Sukma | 90 | Konta (ST) | Kawasi Lakhma | INC | 32,776 | 31.24 | Soyam Muka | BJP | 30,795 | 29.35 | 1,981 |

== Aftermath ==
After the incumbent Congress government was defeated, chief minister Bhupesh Baghel tendered his resignation to governor Biswabhusan Harichandan.

On 10 December 2023, the BJP legislature party meeting was held in Raipur headed by its central observers Arjun Munda, Sarbananda Sonowal and Dushyant Kumar Gautam where Kunkuri MLA Vishnu Deo Sai was elected as the next chief minister and Arun Sao and Vijay Sharma were elected as deputy chief ministers. Later, they met governor Biswabhusan Harichandan and staked claim to form the government.

On 13 December, Vishnu Deo Sai, Arun Sao and Vijay Sharma took oath as chief minister a deputy chief ministers of Chhattisgarh at the Science College ground in Raipur.
