= 2013 Chhattisgarh Legislative Assembly election =

- 11 and 19 November 2013

All 90 seats in the Legislative Assembly 46 seats needed for a majority
- Turnout: 77.45% (▲6.79%)
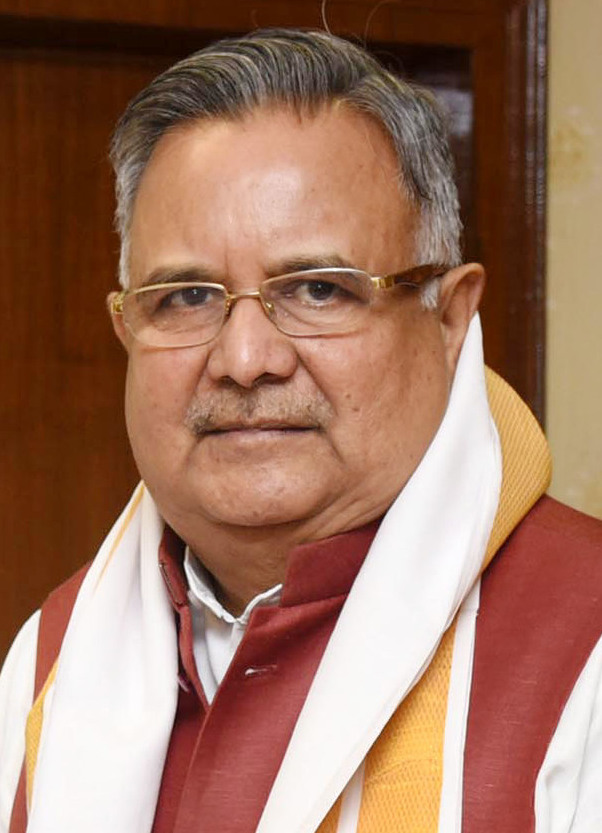

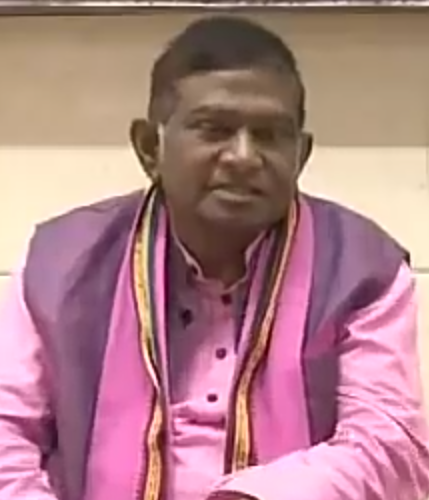

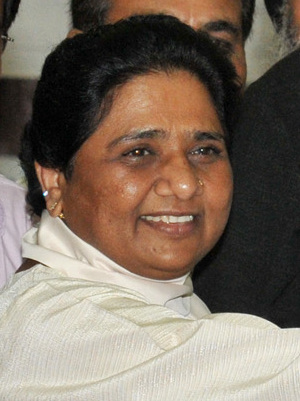
	First party	Second party	Third party
Leader	Raman Singh	Ajit Jogi	Mayawati
Party	BJP	INC	BSP
Alliance	NDA	UPA	-
Leader since	2003	2000	2003
Leader's seat	Rajnandgaon	Marwahi	did not contest
Seats before	50	38	2
Seats after	49	39	1
Seat change	▼1	▲1	▼1
Percentage	41.0%	40.3%	4.3%
Swing	▲0.7%	▲1.7%	▼1.8%
- Seatwise map of the election results

- Structure of the Chhattisgarh Legislative Assembly after the election
CM before election
Raman Singh
BJP
Elected CM
Raman Singh
BJP

Chhattisgarh Legislative Assembly election 2013 was held in two phases on 11 and 19 November in Chhattisgarh state of India. The result was announced on 8 December. Incumbent ruling party BJP and Chief Minister Raman Singh retained the majority in assembly and formed government consequently for the third time.

== Polls ==
Voter-verified paper audit trail (VVPAT) along with EVMs was used in 1 assembly seat in Chhattisgarh elections. The first phase in the Naxal-affected areas of Bastar, consisting of 18 constituencies, voted on 11 November and had a 75.53% voter turnout. The second phase in the other 72 constituencies was held on 19 November and had a 74.7% turnout.

=== Security ===
The Hindu reported that 32 battalions of central paramilitaries were added to the 117,000 security force personnel in the area. Another almost 25,000 Chhattisgarh Police were stations in south Chhattisgarh. As a result, the Gond tribal region would consist of approximately 143,000 armed security personnel. The Hindu stated that after the mobilization of 600 companies of paramilitary forces in the tribal region, it was "one of the most militarized zones in the world."

== Results ==
Results were declared on 8 December 2013. Bharatiya Janata Party won 49 seats while the Indian National Congress won 39 seats. One Independent and one Bahujan Samaj Party candidate also won. BJP retained majority in state legislative assembly for consequently third time and Raman Singh sworn in as a Chief Minister.

=== Party-wise ===
Summary of the 11–19 November 2013 Chhattisgarh Legislative Assembly election results
Parties and coalitions	Popular vote			Seats			
Parties and coalitions	Votes	%	± pp	Contested	Won	+/−	%
Bharatiya Janata Party (BJP)	5,365,272	41.0	▲0.7	90	49	▼1	54.44
Indian National Congress (INC)	5,267,698	40.3	▲1.7	90	39	▲1	43.33
Independents (IND)	697,267	5.3	▼3.2	355	1	▲1	1.11
Bahujan Samaj Party (BSP)	558,424	4.3	▼1.8	90	1	▼1	1.11
Chhattisgarh Swabhiman Manch (CSM)	226,167	1.7	▲1.7	54	0	Steady	0.00
Gondvana Gantantra Party (GGP)	205,325	1.6	Steady	44	0	Steady	0.00
Other parties and candidates	352,622	2.7	▼2.2	353	0	Steady	0.00
None of the Above (NOTA)	401,058	3.1	▲3.1				
Total	13,073,833	100.00		1076	90	±0	100.0
Valid votes	12,672,775	99.90					
Invalid votes	12,051	0.10					
Votes cast / turnout	13,085,884	77.45					
Abstentions	4,222,987	22.55					
Registered voters	16,895,762						
Source: Election Commission of India

=== Region-wise ===
Region	Seats				
Region	Seats	BJP	INC	BSP	IND
Surguja	14	7	7	—N/a	—N/a
Central Chhattisgarh	64	38	24	1	1
Bastar	12	4	8	—N/a	—N/a
Total	90	49	39	1	1

=== District-wise ===
District	Seats				
District	Seats	BJP	INC	BSP	IND
Koriya	3	3	—N/a	—N/a	—N/a
Surajpur	2	—N/a	2	—N/a	—N/a
Balrampur	3	1	2	—N/a	—N/a
Surguja	3	—N/a	3	—N/a	—N/a
Jashpur	3	3	—N/a	—N/a	—N/a
Raigarh	5	3	2	—N/a	—N/a
Korba	4	1	3	—N/a	—N/a
Bilaspur	7	3	4	—N/a	—N/a
Mungeli	2	2	—N/a	—N/a	—N/a
Janjgir-Champa	6	3	2	1	—N/a
Mahasamund	4	3	—N/a	—N/a	1
Baloda Bazar	4	3	1	—N/a	—N/a
Raipur	7	5	2	—N/a	—N/a
Gariaband	2	2	—N/a	—N/a	—N/a
Dhamtari	3	2	1	—N/a	—N/a
Balod	3	—N/a	3	—N/a	—N/a
Durg	6	4	2	—N/a	—N/a
Bemetara	3	3	—N/a	—N/a	—N/a
Kawardha	2	2	—N/a	—N/a	—N/a
Rajnandgaon	6	2	4	—N/a	—N/a
Kanker	3	1	2	—N/a	—N/a
Kondagaon	2	—N/a	2	—N/a	—N/a
Narayanpur	1	1	—N/a	—N/a	—N/a
Bastar	3	1	2	—N/a	—N/a
Dantewada	1	—N/a	1	—N/a	—N/a
Bijapur	1	1	—N/a	—N/a	—N/a
Sukma	1	—N/a	1	—N/a	—N/a
Total	90	49	39	1	1

=== Constituency-wise ===
Constituency		Winner			Runner Up			Margin
#	Name	Candidate	Party	Votes	Candidate	Party	Votes	Margin
Koriya district
1	Bharatpur-Sonhat (ST)	Champa Devi Pawle	BJP	42968	Gulab Kamro	INC	38360	4608
2	Manendragarh	Shyam Bihari Jaiswal	BJP	32613	Gulab Singh	INC	28435	4178
3	Baikunthpur	Bhaiyalal Rajwade	BJP	45471	Bedanti Tiwari	INC	44402	1069
Surajpur district
4	Premnagar	Khelsai Singh	INC	77318	Renuka Singh	BJP	58991	18327
5	Bhatgaon	Paras Nath Rajwade	INC	67339	Rajni Tripathi	BJP	59971	7368
Balrampur district
6	Pratappur (ST)	Ram Sewak Paikra	BJP	66550	Prem Sai Singh Tekam	INC	58407	8143
7	Ramanujganj (ST)	Brihaspat Singh	INC	73174	Ramvichar Netam	BJP	61582	11592
8	Samri (ST)	Pritam Ram	INC	82585	Siddhnath Paikra	BJP	50762	31823
Surguja district
9	Lundra (ST)	Chintamani Maharaj	INC	64771	Vijay Baba	BJP	54825	9946
10	Ambikapur	T. S. Singh Deo	INC	84668	Anurag Singh Deo	BJP	65110	19558
11	Sitapur (ST)	Amarjeet Bhagat	INC	70217	Raja Ram Bhagat	BJP	52362	17855
Jashpur district
12	Jashpur (ST)	Rajsharan Bhagat	BJP	79419	Sarhul Ram Bhagat	INC	45070	34349
13	Kunkuri (ST)	Rohit Kumar Sai	BJP	76593	Abraham Tirkey	INC	47727	28866
14	Pathalgaon (ST)	Shivshankar Paikra	BJP	71485	Rampukar Singh Thakur	INC	67576	3909
Raigarh district
15	Lailunga (ST)	Suniti Rathia	BJP	75093	Hriday Ram Rathiya	INC	60892	14201
16	Raigarh	Roshanlal Agarwal	BJP	91045	Shakrajeet Nayak	INC	70453	20592
17	Sarangarh (SC)	Kerabhai Manhar	BJP	81971	Padma Mahnar	INC	66127	15844
18	Kharsia	Umesh Patel	INC	95470	Jawaharlal Naik	BJP	56582	38888
19	Dharamjaigarh (ST)	Laljeet Singh Rathia	INC	79276	Om Prakash Rathia	BJP	59288	19988
Korba district
20	Rampur (ST)	Shyamlal Kanwar	INC	67868	Nanki Ram Kanwar	BJP	57953	9915
21	Korba	Jai Singh Agrawal	INC	72386	Jogesh Lamba	BJP	57937	14449
22	Katghora	Lakhan Lal Dewangan	BJP	61646	Bodhram Kanwar	INC	48516	13130
23	Pali-Tanakhar (ST)	Ram Dayal Uike	INC	69450	Hira Singh Markam	GGP	40637	28813
Bilaspur district
24	Marwahi (ST)	Amit Jogi	INC	82909	Samira Paikra	BJP	36659	46250
25	Kota	Renu Jogi	INC	58390	Kashiram Sahu	BJP	53301	5089
Mungeli district
26	Lormi	Tokhan Sahu	BJP	52302	Dharmjeet Singh Thakur	INC	46061	6241
27	Mungeli (SC)	Punnulal Mohle	BJP	61026	Chandrabhan Barmate	INC	58281	2745
Bilaspur district
28	Takhatpur	Raju Singh	BJP	44735	Ashish Singh Thakur	INC	44127	608
29	Bilha	Siyaram Kaushik	INC	83598	Dharamlal Kaushik	BJP	72630	10968
30	Bilaspur	Amar Agrawal	BJP	72255	Vani Rao	INC	56656	15599
31	Beltara	Badridhar Diwan	BJP	50890	Bhuvneshwar Yadav	INC	45162	5728
32	Masturi (SC)	Dilip Lahariya	INC	86509	Krishnamurti Bandi	BJP	62363	24146
Janjgir–Champa district
33	Akaltara	Chunnilal Sahu	INC	69355	Dinesh Singh	BJP	47662	21693
34	Janjgir-Champa	Motilal Dewangan	INC	54291	Narayan Chandel	BJP	44080	10211
35	Sakti	Khilawan Sahu	BJP	51577	Saroja Manharan Rathore	INC	42544	9033
36	Chandrapur	Yudhvir Singh Judev	BJP	51295	Ram Kumar Yadav	BSP	45078	6217
37	Jaijaipur	Keshav Prasad Chandra	BSP	47188	Kailash Sahu	BJP	44609	2579
38	Pamgarh (SC)	Ambesh Jangde	BJP	45342	Dujaram Bouddh	BSP	37217	8125
Mahasamund district
39	Saraipali (SC)	Ramlal Chouhan	BJP	82064	Haridas Bharadwaj	INC	53232	28832
40	Basna	Rupkumari Choudhary	BJP	77137	Devendra Bahadur Singh	INC	70898	6239
41	Khallari	Chunni Lal Sahu	BJP	58652	Paresh Bagbahara	INC	52653	5999
42	Mahasamund	Vimal Chopra	IND	47416	Agni Chandrakar	INC	42694	4722
Baloda Bazar district
43	Bilaigarh (SC)	Sangam Jangade	BJP	71364	Shiv Kumar Dahria	INC	58669	12695
44	Kasdol	Gaurishankar Agrawal	BJP	93629	Rajkamal Singhania	INC	70701	22928
45	Baloda Bazar	Janak Ram Verma	INC	76549	Laxmi Baghel	BJP	66572	9977
46	Bhatapara	Shivratan Sharma	BJP	76137	Chaitram Sahu	INC	63797	12340
Raipur district
47	Dharsiwa	Devjibhai Patel	BJP	69419	Anita Yogendra Sharma	INC	67029	2390
48	Raipur Rural	Satyanarayan Sharma	INC	70774	Nand Kumar Sahu	BJP	68913	1861
49	Raipur City West	Rajesh Munat	BJP	64611	Vikas Upadhyay	INC	58451	6160
50	Raipur City North	Shrichand Sundrani	BJP	52164	Kuldeep Juneja	INC	48688	3476
51	Raipur City South	Brijmohan Agrawal	BJP	81429	Kiranmayee Nayak	INC	46630	34799
52	Arang (SC)	Naveen Markaandey	BJP	59067	Guru Rudra Kumar	INC	45293	13774
53	Abhanpur	Dhanendra Sahu	INC	67926	Chandra Shekhar Sahu	BJP	59572	8354
Gariaband district
54	Rajim	Santosh Upadhyay	BJP	69625	Amitesh Shukla	INC	67184	2441
55	Bindrawagarh (ST)	Govardhan Singh Manhi	BJP	85843	Janak Dhruw	INC	55307	30536
Dhamtari district
56	Sihawa (ST)	Shravan Markam	BJP	53894	Ambika Markam	INC	46407	7487
57	Kurud	Ajay Chandrakar	BJP	83190	Lekhram Sahu	INC	56013	27177
58	Dhamtari	Gurumukh Singh Hora	INC	70960	Inder Chopra	BJP	60460	10500
Balod district
59	Sanjari-Balod	Bhaiyaram Sinha	INC	88874	Pritam Sahu	BJP	58441	30433
60	Dondi Lohara (ST)	Anila Bhediya	INC	66026	Horilal Rawate	BJP	46291	19735
61	Gunderdehi	Rajendra Rai	INC	72770	Virendra Sahu	BJP	51490	21280
Durg district
62	Patan	Bhupesh Baghel	INC	68185	Vijay Baghel	BJP	58842	9343
63	Durg Gramin	Ramshila Sahu	BJP	50327	Pratima Chandrakar	INC	47348	2979
64	Durg City	Arun Vora	INC	58645	Hemchand Yadav	BJP	53024	5621
65	Bhilai Nagar	Premprakash Pandey	BJP	55654	Badruddin Quraishi	INC	38548	17106
66	Vaishali Nagar	Vidyaratan Bhasin	BJP	72594	Bhajan Singh Nirankari	INC	48146	24448
67	Ahiwara (SC)	Rajmahant Sanwla Ram Dahre	BJP	75337	Ashok Dongre	INC	43661	31676
Bemetara district
68	Saja	Labhchand Bafna	BJP	81707	Ravindra Choubey	INC	72087	9620
69	Bemetara	Awadhesh Singh Chandel	BJP	74162	Tamradhwaj Sahu	INC	59048	15114
70	Navagarh (SC)	Dayaldas Baghel	BJP	69447	Dheeru Prasad Ghritlahare	CSM	42254	27193
Kawardha district
71	Pandariya	Motiram Chandravanshi	BJP	81685	Lalji Chandravanshi	INC	74412	7273
72	Kawardha	Ashok Sahu	BJP	93645	Mohammad Akbar	INC	91087	2558
Rajnandgaon district
73	Khairagarh	Girwar Janghel	INC	70133	Komal Janghel	BJP	67943	2190
74	Dongargarh (SC)	Sarojini Banjare	BJP	67158	Thaneshwar Patila	INC	62474	4684
75	Rajnandgaon	Raman Singh	BJP	86797	Alka Mudliyar	INC	50931	35866
76	Dongargaon	Daleshwar Sahu	INC	67755	Dinesh Gandhi	BJP	66057	1698
77	Khujji	Bholaram Sahu	INC	51873	Rajinder Bhatia	IND	43179	8694
78	Mohla-Manpur (ST)	Tej Kunwar Netam	INC	42648	Bhojesh Singh Mandavi	BJP	41692	956
Kanker district
79	Antagarh (ST)	Vikram Usendi	BJP	53477	Manturam Pawar	INC	48306	5171
80	Bhanupratappur (ST)	Manoj Singh Mandavi	INC	64837	Satish Latiya	BJP	49941	14896
81	Kanker (ST)	Shankar Dhruw	INC	50586	Sanjay Kodopi	BJP	45961	4625
Kondagaon district
82	Keshkal (ST)	Santram Netam	INC	53867	Sewakram Netam	BJP	45178	8689
83	Kondagaon (ST)	Mohan Markam	INC	54290	Lata Usendi	BJP	49155	5135
Narayanpur district
84	Narayanpur (ST)	Kedar Nath Kashyap	BJP	54874	Chandan Kashyap	INC	42074	12800
Bastar district
85	Bastar (ST)	Lakheshwar Baghel	INC	57942	Subhau Kashyap	BJP	38774	19168
86	Jagdalpur	Santosh Bafna	BJP	64803	Shamu Kashyap	INC	48145	16658
87	Chitrakot (ST)	Deepak Baij	INC	50303	Baiduram Kashyap	BJP	37974	12329
Dantewada district
88	Dantewada (ST)	Devati Karma	INC	41417	Bhima Mandavi	BJP	35430	5987
Bijapur district
89	Bijapur (ST)	Mahesh Gagda	BJP	29578	Rajendra Pambhoi	INC	20091	9487
Sukma district
90	Konta (ST)	Kawasi Lakhma	INC	27610	Dhaniram Barse	BJP	21824	5786

== See also ==
- 2013 elections in India
- 2008 Chhattisgarh Legislative Assembly election
