= Uddheshwari Paikra =

Indian politician

Uddheshwari Paikra (born 1972) is an Indian politician from Chhattisgarh. She is an MLA from Samri Assembly constituency, which is reserved for Scheduled Tribes community, in Balrampur District. She won the 2023 Chhattisgarh Legislative Assembly election representing the Bharatiya Janata Party.

== Early life and education ==
Paikra is from Samri, Balrampur District, Chhattisgarh. She married Sidhnath Paikra, also a politician. She passed Class 12 in 1989 at the Government Higher Secondary School, Amarkantak, Shahdol. She is a member of the Balrampur Zilla Panchayat and earlier worked as a petrol bunk operator.

== Career ==
Paikra won from Samri Assembly constituency representing the Bharatiya Janata Party in the 2023 Chhattisgarh Legislative Assembly election. She polled 83,483 votes and defeated her nearest rival, Vijay Paikra of Indian National Congress, by a margin of 13,943 votes. She is one among the few elected MLAs who face criminal cases as per her affidavit with Election Commission of India.
