= Ambika Markam =

Indian politician

Ambika Markam is an Indian politician from the Indian National Congress. In the 2023 Chhattisgarh Legislative Assembly election, she was elected in the Sihawa Assembly constituency.

== See also ==
- 6th Chhattisgarh Assembly
