= Asharam Netam =

Indian politician

Asharam Netam (born 1981) is an Indian politician from Chhattisgarh. He is an MLA from Kanker Assembly constituency, which is reserved for Scheduled Tribes community, in Kanker District. He won the 2023 Chhattisgarh Legislative Assembly election, representing the Bharatiya Janata Party.

== Early life and education ==
Netam is from Kanker, Chhattisgarh. His father, Jainu Ram Netam, is a farmer. He completed his B.A. in 2014 at a college affiliated with MATS University.

== Career ==
Netam won from Kanker Assembly constituency representing the Bharatiya Janata Party in the 2023 Chhattisgarh Legislative Assembly election. He polled votes and defeated his nearest rival, Shankar Dhruw of the Indian National Congress, by a slender margin of 16 votes. The narrow margin of 16 votes was the closest electoral contest in the 2023 Chhattisgarh Assembly election.
