= 1972 Madhya Pradesh Legislative Assembly election =

Indian state election

- 8 March 1972

All 296 assembly constituencies 149 seats needed for a majority
- Registered: 20,859,747
- Turnout: 49.83%

	Majority party	Minority party
Leader	Prakash Chandra Sethi	undeclared
Party	INC	ABJS
Leader since	1980
Last election	167	78
Seats won	220	48
Seat change	▲53	▼30
Popular vote	52,19,823	31,18,832
Percentage	47.93%	28.64%
Chief Minister before election
Shyama Charan Shukla
INC
Elected Chief Minister
Prakash Chandra Sethi
INC

Elections to the Madhya Pradesh Legislative Assembly were held in March 1972. These were the elections to the legislative assembly having 296 seats in undivided Madhya Pradesh. The Indian National Congress won a majority of seats and Prakash Chandra Sethi was sworn in as the new Chief Minister.

After the 1962 Madhya Pradesh Legislative Assembly election, the number of constituencies in Madhya Pradesh were increased to 296, following the recommendation of the Delimitation Commission of India.

== Results ==
#	Party	Seats Contested	Seats won	Seats Changed	% Votes
1	Indian National Congress	289	220	▲53	47.93%
1	Bharatiya Jana Sangh	260	48	▼30	28.64%
3	Samyukta Socialist Party/Socialist Party	172	7	N/A	6.24%
4	Communist Party of India	30	3	▲2	1.02%
7	Independent	296	18	▼4	14.73%
	Total		296		

== Elected members ==
Constituency	Reserved for	Member	Party
Sheopur	None	Lokendra Singh	Bharatiya Jana Sangh
Bijeypur	None	Jagmohan Singh	Bharatiya Jana Sangh
Sabalgarh	None	Raghubar Dayal Rasoiya	Indian National Congress
Joura	None	Ramcharan Lal Mishra	Indian National Congress
Morena	None	Maharaj Singh	Bharatiya Jana Sangh
Dimni	SC	Chhawi Ram	Bharatiya Jana Sangh
Ambah	SC	Raja Ram Singh	Indian National Congress
Gohad	SC	Bhure Lal	Bharatiya Jana Sangh
Mehgaon	None	Rameshwar Dayal Dantre	Samyukta Socialist Party
Attair	None	Rameshwar Dayal Arele	Indian National Congress
Bhind	None	Navin Chandra Bhoota	Indian National Congress
Ron	None	Rasal Singh	Bharatiya Jana Sangh
Lahar	None	Raghavram Chaudhary	Indian National Congress
Gwalior	None	Srrvate Ramchandra	Communist Party of India
Lashkar	None	Sitila Sahai	Bharatiya Jana Sangh
Morar	None	Rajendra Singh	Indian National Congress
Gird	None	Vijayaraje Scindhia	Bharatiya Jana Sangh
Dabra	None	Pahadsingh	Indian National Congress
Bhander	SC	Chaturbhuj Morya	Bharatiya Jana Sangh
Seondha	None	Shiv Charan	Indian National Congress
Datia	None	Gulab Chand Kannoolal	Bharatiya Jana Sangh
Karera	None	Hardas Gupta	Bharatiya Jana Sangh
Pohri	SC	Babu Lal	Bharatiya Jana Sangh
Shivpuri	None	Sushil B. Ashathana	Bharatiya Jana Sangh
Pichhore	None	Bhanu Pratap Singh	Indian National Congress
Kolaras	None	Jagadish Prasad Verma	Bharatiya Jana Sangh
Guna	None	Shivpratap Singh	Bharatiya Jana Sangh
Chachaura	None	Krishnvallabh Gupta	Bharatiya Jana Sangh
Raghogarh	SC	Harlal Shakyawar	Bharatiya Jana Sangh
Ashoknagar	None	Mahendra Singh	Bharatiya Jana Sangh
Mungaoli	None	Gajra Singh	Bharatiya Jana Sangh
Niwari	None	Luxmi Narayan Nayak	Samyukta Socialist Party
Jatara	None	Ram Krishna Mishra	Indian National Congress
Kharagpur	SC	Baiju Ahirwar	Indian National Congress
Tikamgarh	None	Sardar Singh	Indian National Congress
Malehra	None	Dashrath	Indian National Congress
Bijawar	None	Yadvendra Singh	Bharatiya Jana Sangh
Chhatarpur	None	Mahendra Kumar	Indian National Congress
Maharajpur	SC	Nathoo Ram	Bharatiya Jana Sangh
Laundi	None	Baboo Ram Chaturvedi	Indian National Congress
Panna	None	Het Ram Dube	Indian National Congress
Amanganj	SC	Tatu Lal	Indian National Congress
Pawai	None	Jagdish Singh	Indian National Congress
Maihar	None	Lalji Patel	Indian National Congress
Nagod	SC	Bala Prasad	Indian National Congress
Satna	None	Kanta	Indian National Congress
Chitrakoot	None	Ram Chandra Bajpayee	Indian National Congress
Ranpur Baghelan	None	Toshan Singh	Samyukta Socialist Party
Amarpatan	None	Gulsher Ahmed	Indian National Congress
Rewa	None	Muni Prasad Shukla	Indian National Congress
Sirmaur	None	Rajmani Patel	Indian National Congress
Teonthar	None	Triveni Prasad	Bharatiya Jana Sangh
Mangawan	None	Shriniwas Tiwari	Samyukta Socialist Party
Gurh	None	Rampal Singh	Indian National Congress
Deotalab	SC	Ramkhelavan	Samyukta Socialist Party
Mauganj	None	Ramdhani Mishra	Independent
Churahat	None	Chandra Pratap	Indian National Congress
Sidhi	None	Arjun Singh	Indian National Congress
Deosar	ST	Balraj	Indian National Congress
Singrauli	None	Shyamkartik Ram	Indian National Congress
Gopadbanas	ST	Jagwa	Independent
Beohari	None	Ramgopal Gupta	Bharatiya Jana Sangh
Umaria	None	Ranvijaya Pratap Singh	Indian National Congress
Naorozabad	ST	Jagan Nath Singh	Indian National Congress
Jaisingnagar	ST	Kamala Prasad	Independent
Sohagpur	None	Krishnapal Singh	Indian National Congress
Pushparajgarh	ST	Dalbir Singh	Independent
Kotma	None	Mrigendra Singh	Indian National Congress
Jaitpur	ST	Bhagwandin	Indian National Congress
Manendragarh	ST	Dharam Pal	Indian National Congress
Baikunthpur	None	Ramchandra Singh Deo	Indian National Congress
Premnagar	ST	Bhuvneshwar	Bharatiya Jana Sangh
Surajpur	None	Dhirendranath	Indian National Congress
Pal	ST	Deosai	Indian National Congress
Samri	ST	Larangsai	Bharatiya Jana Sangh
Lundra	ST	Chamru Ram	Indian National Congress
Ambikapur	None	Devendra Khumari	Indian National Congress
Lakhanpur	None	Satyanarayan	Indian National Congress
Sitapur	ST	Sukhi Ram	Indian National Congress
Bagicha	ST	Narhari Prasad Sai	Bharatiya Jana Sangh
Jashpur	ST	Luis Bega	Indian National Congress
Tapkara	ST	Dineshwar Sai	Bharatiya Jana Sangh
Pathalgaon	ST	Laljit Singh	Bharatiya Jana Sangh
Dharamjaigarh	None	Vaidya Begraj Sharma	Indian National Congress
Gharghoda	ST	Surendra Singh	Indian National Congress
Raigarh	None	Ramkumar Agrawal	Indian National Congress
Pussour	None	Kamla Kumari	Indian National Congress
Sarangarh	SC	Sheo Prasad Gotia	Indian National Congress
Rampur	ST	Pyarelal Sheoprasad	Indian National Congress
Kotghora	None	Bodhram	Independent
Tanakhar	ST	Lal Kirtikumar Singh	Independent
Marwahi	ST	Bhavar Singh Porte	Indian National Congress
Kota	None	Mathuraprasad Dube	Indian National Congress
Lormi	None	Rajendra Prasad Shukla	Indian National Congress
Mungeli	SC	Ganeshram Anant	Indian National Congress
Jarhagaon	None	Mohammad Bashir Khan	Indian National Congress
Takhatpur	None	Rohani Kumar	Indian National Congress
Bilaspur	None	Shridhar Mishra	Indian National Congress
Bilha	None	Chitrakant Jaiswal	Indian National Congress
Masturi	SC	Godil Prasad	Indian National Congress
Pamgarh	SC	Kulpatsingh Kupitram	Indian National Congress
Akaltara	None	Rajendra Kumar Singh	Indian National Congress
Baloda	None	Radheshyam Shukla	Indian National Congress
Champa	None	Bisahudas Mahant	Indian National Congress
Sakti	None	Pushpendranath Singh	Independent
Malkharoda	SC	Pooranlal Jangade	Bharatiya Jana Sangh
Chandrapur	None	Bhawanilal Verma	Indian National Congress
Abhanpur	None	Chetram Parshottam	Bharatiya Jana Sangh
Raipur	None	Sudhirmukherji	Independent
Arang	SC	Kanhaiyalal Kosariya	Indian National Congress
Dharsiwan	None	Munnalal Shukla	Indian National Congress
Baloda Bazar	None	Dolatram Ramdayal	Indian National Congress
Bhatapara	None	Shivlal Mehta	Indian National Congress
Palari	SC	Phoolsingh	Indian National Congress
Kasdol	None	Kanhaiyalal Sharma	Indian National Congress
Bhatgaon	SC	Reshamlal Tikaram	Independent
Saraipali	None	V. B. Singh	Indian National Congress
Basna	None	Laxman Jaideo	Indian National Congress
Pithora	None	Thamkur Bhanupratap Singh	Indian National Congress
Mahasamund	None	Purushottamlal K. Dhaluram	Samyukta Socialist Party
Rajim	None	Shyamcharan Shukla	Indian National Congress
Bindranawagarh	ST	Parwati K. P. Shah	Independent
Sihawa	ST	Pusauram	Indian National Congress
Dhamtari	None	Keshrimal	Indian National Congress
Kurud	None	Yeshwant Rao Meghawale	Bharatiya Jana Sangh
Bhanupratappur	ST	Satyanarain Singh	Indian National Congress
Kanker	ST	Vishram Dhongai	Indian National Congress
Keskai	ST	Ganga Ram Rana	Indian National Congress
Kondagaon	ST	Mankuram Sodi	Indian National Congress
Bakawand	ST	Jhitruram	Indian National Congress
Jagdalpur	ST	Baliram Kashyap Mahadev	Bharatiya Jana Sangh
Chitrakote	ST	Ramakonda	Indian National Congress
Konta	ST	Beti Harma	Bharatiya Jana Sangh
Dantewara	ST	Lakshman Karma	Indian National Congress
Bijapur	ST	Kistaiya Papaiya	Indian National Congress
Narayanpur	ST	Ratiram	Indian National Congress
Maro	SC	Kishan	Indian National Congress
Bemetara	None	Laxman Prasad Vaidya	Indian National Congress
Dhamdha	SC	Tumanlal	Indian National Congress
Bhilai	None	Phoolchand Bafna	Indian National Congress
Durg	None	Motilal Vora	Indian National Congress
Bhathagaon	None	Kejouram	Independent
Gunderdehi	None	Ghanaram Sahu	Independent
Balod	None	Hiralal Sonboir	Indian National Congress
Dondi Lohara	ST	Jhumuklal Bhendia	Indian National Congress
Chowki	ST	Gobardhan	Indian National Congress
Khujji	None	Baldev Prasad Mishra	Indian National Congress
Rajnandgaon	None	Kishorilal	Indian National Congress
Dongargaon	None	S. Jairam Ayyar	Indian National Congress
Dongargarh	None	Hiraram Ramsewak	Indian National Congress
Khairagarh	None	Vijayalal Oswal	Indian National Congress
Bireudranagar	None	Deviprasad Choube	Indian National Congress
Kawardha	None	Kumar Yashwant Raj Singh	Independent
Baihar	ST	Sudhanwasingh	Bharatiya Jana Sangh
Lanji	None	Narbada Pd. Shrivastava	Independent
Kirnapur	None	Jhankarsingh	Indian National Congress
Waraseoni	None	Thansingh	Indian National Congress
Khairalanjee	None	Madhusudan	Indian National Congress
Katangi	None	Chittor Singh	Indian National Congress
Balaghat	None	Nandkishor	Indian National Congress
Paraswada	None	Tejlal Tembhre	Indian National Congress
Mandla	None	Narayani Devi	Indian National Congress
Bichhiya	ST	Darbari Singh	Indian National Congress
Ghughri	ST	Shyamlal Ujiyar	Bharatiya Jana Sangh
Bajag	ST	Mohansingh Daulatsingh	Indian National Congress
Dindori	ST	Sunderlal Ureti	Indian National Congress
Niwas	ST	Anoopsingh Harisingh	Bharatiya Jana Sangh
Bargi	None	Nathusingh	Indian National Congress
Panagar	None	Girwar Singh Patel	Indian National Congress
Jabalpur Cantonment	None	Manmohandas	Indian National Congress
Jabalpur West	None	Sawaimal	Indian National Congress
Jabalpur East	None	Krishnaawatar Bhanot	Indian National Congress
Patan	SC	Motilal Shenkar	Indian National Congress
Katangi	None	Satendraprasad Mishra	Indian National Congress
Sihora	None	Parmanandbhai	Indian National Congress
Bahoriband	None	Kunjbihari Lal	Indian National Congress
Murwara	None	Lakhan Singh Solanki	Indian National Congress
Badwara	None	N. V. Raman	Indian National Congress
Vijairaghogarh	None	Ramrani Johar	Indian National Congress
Nohata	None	Thakur Neknarayan Singh	Indian National Congress
Damoh	None	Anand Kumar	Independent
Hatta	None	Kunjbiharilal Manmohanlal	Indian National Congress
Patharia	SC	Gopal Das Munnilal	Indian National Congress
Banda	None	Shri Krishna Selat	Indian National Congress
Bina	None	Dalchand Bhagwandas	Indian National Congress
Khurai	SC	Liladhar	Indian National Congress
Sagar	None	Jwalaprasad Jyotishi	Indian National Congress
Surkhi	SC	Gaya Prasad Kabirpanthi	Indian National Congress
Rehli	None	Gourishankar Pathak	Indian National Congress
Deori	None	Dwarika Prasad Katare	Indian National Congress
Gadarwara	None	Hari Shanker Sthapak	Indian National Congress
Bohani	None	Agarwal L. N. Khajanchi	Indian National Congress
Nasimhapur	None	S. S. Narayan Mushram	Indian National Congress
Gotegaon	None	Narsingdas	Indian National Congress
Lakhnadon	ST	Basantrao Uikey	Indian National Congress
Chhapara	ST	Satendrasingh Thakur	Indian National Congress
Keolari	None	Vimla K. P. Verma	Indian National Congress
Barghat	None	Jageshwarnath Bisen	Bharatiya Jana Sangh
Seoni	None	Nityendra Nath Sheel	Indian National Congress
Chhindwara	None	Jagdish Prasad Chandrakar	Indian National Congress
Parasia	SC	Barikrao Amrutrao	Indian National Congress
Damua	ST	Rajkumari Gyanda	Indian National Congress
Amarwara	ST	Udayabhanshah	Indian National Congress
Chaurai	None	Laxminarayan Lalji Prasad	Indian National Congress
Sausar	None	Manikrao Narayanrao	Indian National Congress
Pandhurna	None	Madhavlal Dube Mikulal	Indian National Congress
Multai	None	Radhakrishna Garg Vakeel	Independent
Masod	None	Ramji Chhitraiya Mahajan	Independent
Bhainsdehi	ST	Kalyasingh Balaji	Indian National Congress
Betul	None	Maruti Narayanrao	Indian National Congress
Ghoradongri	ST	Bishram Gurdi	Indian National Congress
Piparia	None	Ratan Kumari Devi	Indian National Congress
Denwa	None	Vinay Kumar Diwan	Indian National Congress
Hoshangabad	None	Sushila Dixit	Indian National Congress
Itarsi	None	Hari Prasad Chaturvedi	Indian National Congress
Timarni	SC	Kheeprasad Bastabad	Indian National Congress
Harda	None	Nanhelal Patel	Indian National Congress
Sanchi	SC	Dulichand	Indian National Congress
Udaipura	None	Goutam Sharma	Indian National Congress
Bereli	None	Jaswant Singh	Indian National Congress
Ghojpur	None	Gulabchand	Indian National Congress
Budhni	None	Saligram Vakil	Independent
Ashta	SC	Umrao Singh Dariya Singh	Indian National Congress
Sehore	None	Aziz Qureshi	Indian National Congress
Bhopal	None	Khan Shakir Ali Khan	Communist Party of India
Govindpura	None	Mohanlal Asthana	Indian National Congress
Bairagarh	None	Laxmi Narain Sharma	Bharatiya Jana Sangh
Berasia	None	Gauri Shankar Kaushal	Bharatiya Jana Sangh
Kurwai	None	Awadh Narayan	Bharatiya Jana Sangh
Vidisha	None	Surya Prakash	Indian National Congress
Basoda	SC	Sita Ram	Bharatiya Jana Sangh
Sironj	None	I. Khan Tarzi Mashriqul	Indian National Congress
Biaora	None	Ram Karan Ugra	Indian National Congress
Narsingarh	None	Mangi Lal Bhandari	Indian National Congress
Sarangpur	SC	Sajjan Singh Vishnar	Indian National Congress
Rajgarh	None	Gulab Singh	Indian National Congress
Khilchipur	None	Prabhu Dayal Choube	Indian National Congress
Shujalpur	None	Rameshwar Dayal Sharma	Indian National Congress
Gulana	None	Ramesh Dube	Indian National Congress
Shajapur	None	Tara P. Chandra Sharma	Indian National Congress
Susner	None	Haribhau Joshi	Bharatiya Jana Sangh
Agar	SC	Madhukar Marmat	Indian National Congress
Tarana	None	Lakshminarayan Jain	Indian National Congress
Mahidpur	None	Narayan Prasad Sharma	Indian National Congress
Ujjain North	None	Prakash Chand Sethi	Indian National Congress
Ujjain South	SC	Durgadas Suryavansi	Indian National Congress
Khacharod	None	Kunwar Veerendra Singh	Bharatiya Jana Sangh
Barnagar	None	Abhyasingh	Indian National Congress
Depalpur	None	Ramchandra Agrawal	Indian National Congress
Mhow	None	Prakash Chand Sethi	Indian National Congress
Indore 1	None	Mahesh Joshi	Indian National Congress
Indore 2	None	Homi Daji	Communist Party of India
Indore 3	None	Chandra Prabhash Shekhar	Indian National Congress
Indore 4	None	Narayan Prasad Shukla	Indian National Congress
Sawer	SC	Radhakrishan Malviya	Indian National Congress
Dewas	None	Dhirajsingh Mohansingh	Indian National Congress
Sonkatch	SC	Bapulal Kishanlal	Indian National Congress
Bagli	None	Kailashchandra Umashankar	Bharatiya Jana Sangh
Khategaon	None	Manjulabai Vagle	Indian National Congress
Harsud	None	Kalicharan Sakargaye	Indian National Congress
Nimarkhedi	None	Raghunath Rao Mandloi	Indian National Congress
Pandhana	SC	Sakharam Deokaran	Bharatiya Jana Sangh
Khandwa	None	Gangacharan Mishra	Indian National Congress
Shahpur	None	Shivkumarsingh Nawalsingh	Indian National Congress
Burhanpur	None	Brijmohan D. Mishra	Bharatiya Jana Sangh
Bhikangaon	None	Rana Balbahadur Singh	Indian National Congress
Barwaha	None	Amolakchand Chajed	Indian National Congress
Maheshwar	SC	Sitaram Sadhuram	Indian National Congress
Khargone	None	Chandrakanta R. Khode	Indian National Congress
Dhulkot	ST	Sobhagsingh Dhyansingh	Indian National Congress
Sendhwa	ST	Shobharam Patel	Indian National Congress
Rajpur	ST	Barku Mahadu Chouhan	Indian National Congress
Anjad	None	Babu G. Solanki	Bharatiya Jana Sangh
Barwani	ST	Umraosingh Parwatsingh	Bharatiya Jana Sangh
Manawar	ST	Shivbhanu Solanki	Indian National Congress
Dharampuri	ST	Fatebhansingh Ramsingh	Indian National Congress
Dhar	None	Surendrasingh Gangasingh	Indian National Congress
Badnawar	None	Chiranjilal Alawa	Indian National Congress
Sardarpur	SC	Babusingh Alawa	Indian National Congress
Kukshi	ST	Pratapsingh Baghel	Indian National Congress
Alirajpur	ST	Magan Singh Patel	Indian National Congress
Jobat	ST	Ajmersingh	Indian National Congress
Jhabua	ST	Gangabai	Indian National Congress
Thandla	ST	Manna	Samyukta Socialist Party
Petlawad	ST	Dileep Singh	Indian National Congress
Sailana	ST	Prabhudayal Gehiote	Indian National Congress
Ratlam	None	Akbarali Arif	Indian National Congress
Jaora	None	Bankatelal Todi	Indian National Congress
Alot	SC	Lila Devi Choudhary	Indian National Congress
Manasa	None	Surajbhai Tugnawat	Indian National Congress
Garoth	None	Kasturchand Chaudhary	Indian National Congress
Suwasara	SC	Ramgopal Bhartiya	Indian National Congress
Sitamau	None	Dhansukhlal Bhachawat	Indian National Congress
Mandsaur	None	Shyam Sunder Patidar	Indian National Congress
Neemuch	None	Raghunandan Prasad	Indian National Congress
Jawad	None	Kanhiyalal Nagauri	Indian National Congress
