= Harshita Swami Baghel =

Indian politician

Harshita Swami Baghel (born 1987) is an Indian politician from Chhattisgarh. She is a Member of the Legislative Assembly (MLA) from Dongargarh Assembly constituency, which is reserved for Scheduled Caste community, in Rajnandgaon district. She won the 2023 Chhattisgarh Legislative Assembly election representing the Indian National Congress.

== Early life and education ==
Baghel is from Dongargarh, Rajnandgaon district, Chhattisgarh. She married Manish Baghel, a government medical officer. She completed her M.A. and L.L.B. in 2019 at Pandit Ravishankar Shukla University, Raipur.

== Career ==
Baghel won from Dongargarh Assembly constituency representing the Indian National Congress in the 2023 Chhattisgarh Legislative Assembly election. She polled 89,145 votes and defeated her nearest rival, Vinod Khandekar of the Bharatiya Janata Party, by a margin of 14,367 votes.
