= Indrashah Mandavi =

Indian politician

Indrashah Mandavi (born 1962) is an Indian politician from Chhattisgarh. He is an MLA from Mohla-Manpur Assembly constituency in Mohla-Manpur-Ambagarh Chowki district. He won the 2023 Chhattisgarh Legislative Assembly election, representing the Indian National Congress.

== Early life and education ==
Mandavi is from Mohla Manpur, Mohla Manpur Ambagarh Chowki district, Chhattisgarh. He is the son of late Nilkanth Shah Mandavi. He completed his post graduation in history and also did a diploma in Civil Engineering.

== Career ==
Mandavi won from Mohla Manpur Assembly constituency representing the Indian National Congress in the 2023 Chhattisgarh Legislative Assembly election. He polled 77,454 votes and defeated his nearest rival, Sanjeev Shah of the Bharatiya Janata Party, by a margin of 31,741 votes. He first became an MLA winning the 2018 Chhattisgarh Legislative Assembly election defeating Kanchan Mala Bhuarya of the BJP by a margin of 21,048 votes.
