= Savitri Manoj Mandavi =

Indian politician

Savitri Manoj Mandavi (born 1966) is an Indian politician from Chhattisgarh. She is an MLA from Bhanupratappur Assembly constituency, which is reserved for Scheduled Tribes community, in Kanker district. She won the 2023 Chhattisgarh Legislative Assembly election representing Indian National Congress.

== Early life and education ==
Savitri is from Bhanupratappur, Kanker district, Chhattisgarh. Her late husband Manoj Singh Mandavi was a two time former MLA from the same constituency and was a deputy speaker of the house. She completed her BHSC in 1988 at Government College of Dhamtari, Pandit Ravishankar Shukla University, Raipur. Before joining politics, she quit her job as a government teacher.

== Career ==
Savitri won from Bhanupratapur Assembly constituency representing the Indian National Congress in the 2023 Chhattisgarh Legislative Assembly election. She polled 89,931 votes and defeated her nearest rival, Gautam Uikey of the Bharatiya Janata Party, by a margin of 30,932 votes. She first became an MLA winning the 2022 bye election which caused due the death of her husband Manoj Mandavi, the sitting MLA.
