= Kedar Nath Kashyap =

Indian politician

Minister of Water Resources Government of Chhattisgarh
- Incumbent
- Assumed office 22 December 2023
- Appointed by: Biswabhusan Harichandan
- Chief Minister: Vishnu Deo Sai
- Preceded by: Ravindra Choubey

Minister of Forest and Climate Change Government of Chhattisgarh
- Incumbent
- Assumed office 22 December 2023
- Governor: Biswabhusan Harichandan
- Chief Minister: Vishnu Deo Sai
- Preceded by: Mohammad Akbar

Minister of Co-operatives Government of Chhattisgarh
- Incumbent
- Assumed office 22 December 2023
- Governor: Biswabhusan Harichandan
- Chief Minister: Vishnu Deo Sai
- Preceded by: Prem Sai Singh Tekam

Member of Chhattisgarh Legislative Assembly
- Incumbent
- Assumed office 3 December 2023
- Preceded by: Chandan Kashyap
- Constituency: Narayanpur
- In office 7 December 2008 – 11 December 2018
- Preceded by: Vikram Usendi
- Succeeded by: Chandan Kashyap
- Constituency: Narayanpur
- In office 7 December 2003 – 7 December 2008
- Preceded by: Anturam Kashyap
- Constituency: Bhanpuri

Minister of School Education, Government of Chhattisgarh
- In office 9 December 2013 – 11 December 2018
- Chief Minister: Raman Singh
- Preceded by: Brijmohan Agrawal
- Succeeded by: Prem Sai Singh Tekam

Minister of Tribal and Scheduled Caste, Backward Class and Minority Development, Government of Chhattisgarh
- In office 8 December 2008 – 11 December 2018
- Chief Minister: Raman Singh
- Succeeded by: Prem Sai Singh Tekam

Minister of Public Health Engineering, Government of Chhattisgarh
- In office 7 December 2003 – 8 December 2013
- Chief Minister: Raman Singh
- Preceded by: Bhupesh Baghel
- Succeeded by: Ram Sewak Paikra

Personal details
- Born: Kedar Nath Kashyap; 5 November 1974 (age 51) Farsaguda, Bastar, Madhya Pradesh (now in Chhattisgarh), India
- Party: Bharatiya Janata Party
- Spouse: Shanti Kashyap
- Children: 3
- Parent: Baliram Kashyap
- Education: Pandit Ravishankar Shukla University
- Profession: Agriculture, Politician

Kedar Nath Kashyap (born 5 November 1974) is an Indian politician and a member of Bharatiya Janata Party. He is current Forest And Climate Change Minister of Chhattisgarh. He served as Cabinet Minister in Government of Chhattisgarh holding School Education, Tribal and Scheduled Caste, Backward Class and Minority Development portfolios. He is fourth time MLA in legislative assembly of Chhattisgarh.

He is son of senior BJP Leader Late Baliram Kashyap and younger brother of former MP Dinesh Kashyap.

== Political career ==
Kashyap was first elected as MLA in 2003 from Bhanpuri constituency and became Minister of State (Independent Charge) in Raman Singh's ministry. He got re-elected in 2008 from Narayanpur and also retained the seat in 2013 Assembly election. He served as Cabinet Minister for Tribal and Scheduled Caste, Backward Class and Minority Development during 2008 to 2018. He lost 2018 Assembly election to Chandan Kashyap of Congress.
