= Prabodh Minz =

Indian politician

Member of Chhattisgarh Legislative Assembly
- Incumbent
- Assumed office 2023
- Preceded by: Pritam Ram
- Constituency: Lundra

Personal details
- Political party: Bharatiya Janata Party
- Profession: Politician

Prabodh Minz (born 1962) is an Indian politician from Chhattisgarh. He is an MLA from Lundra Assembly constituency, which is a reserved constituency for Scheduled Tribes community, in Surguja district. He won the 2023 Chhattisgarh Legislative Assembly election, representing the Bharatiya Janata Party.

== Early life and education ==
Minz is from Bhagwanpur, Ambikapur tehsil, Surguja district, Chhattisgarh. His late father, Bernard Samuel Minz, was a farmer. He also served as a councilor. He did his diploma in mechanical in 1983 awarded by Madhya Pradesh Board of Technical Education, Bhopal. He is a Catholic Christian. He was formerly with the Indian National Congress but switched to Nationalist Congress Party for a short while in 2003 before joining the BJP in 2004.

== Career ==
Minz won from Lundra Assembly constituency representing the Bharatiya Janata Party in the 2023 Chhattisgarh Legislative Assembly election. He polled 87,463 votes and defeated his nearest rival, Pritam Ram of the Indian National Congress, by a margin of 24,128 votes.

He served as Mayor of Ambikapur city for two terms from 2004. During his term as the mayor, Ambikapur won five Clean City awards. He was a member of the State Minority Commission in 2019. Later in 2019, he was also elected as a corporator in the municipal elections.

== See also ==
- 6th Chhattisgarh Assembly
