= Mohla-Manpur Assembly constituency =

Legislative Assembly constituency in Chhattisgarh State, India

Coordinates: 20.58°N 80.75°E

Mohla-Manpur
- Constituency No. 78 for the Chhattisgarh Legislative Assembly

Constituency details
- Country: India
- Region: Central India
- State: Chhattisgarh
- District: Rajnandgaon
- Lok Sabha constituency: Rajnandgaon
- Established: 2008
- Total electors: 168,008
- Reservation: ST

Member of Legislative Assembly
- 6th Chhattisgarh Legislative Assembly
- Incumbent Indrashah Mandavi
- Party: Indian National Congress
- Elected year: 2023
- Preceded by: Tej Kunwar Netam

Mohla-Manpur is one of the 90 Legislative Assembly constituencies of Chhattisgarh state in India.

It is part of Rajnandgaon district and is reserved for candidates belonging to the Scheduled Tribes.

== Members of the Legislative Assembly ==
Year	Member	Party
Prior to 2008: Constituency did not exist
2008	Shivraj Singh Usare	Indian National Congress
2013	Tej Kunwar Netam	Indian National Congress
2018	Indrashah Mandavi	Indian National Congress
2023	Indrashah Mandavi	Indian National Congress

== Election results ==
=== 2023 ===
2023 Chhattisgarh Legislative Assembly election: Mohla-Manpur
Party	Candidate	Votes	%	±%
INC	Indrashah Mandavi	77,454	57.79	+17.44
BJP	Sanjeev Shah	45,713	34.11	+10.55
Hamar Raj Party	Yuvraj Netam	1,316	0.98	New
Forward Democratic Labour Party	Hemlal Darro	1,254	0.94	
Independent	Bramharam Mandavi	1,225	0.91	
NOTA	None of the Above	3,354	2.5	−0.88
Majority		31,741	23.68	+6.89
Turnout		134,027	79.77	−0.51
INC hold		Swing		

=== 2018 ===
Chhattisgarh Legislative Assembly Election, 2018: Mohla-Manpur
Party	Candidate	Votes	%	±%
INC	Indrashah Mandavi	50,576	40.35	
BJP	Kanchan Mala Bhuarya	29,528	23.56	
JCC	Sanjeet Thakur	28,740	22.93	
Independent	Smt. Khagesh Thakur	3,769	3.01	
API	Siyaram Nuroti	1,461	1.17	
Independent	Dhanesh Koliyare	1,394	1.11	
SS	Pyarelal Koratia	1,371	1.09	
AAP	Arjun Mandavi	1,269	1.01	
Independent	Kanak Nagvansi	1,153	0.92	
NOTA	None of the Above	4,238	3.38	
Majority		21,048	16.79	
Turnout		124,903	80.28	
INC hold		Swing		

== See also ==
- List of constituencies of the Chhattisgarh Legislative Assembly
- Rajnandgaon district
