= Takhatpur Assembly constituency =

Legislative Assembly constituency in Chhattisgarh State, India

Coordinates: 22.13°N 81.87°E

Takhatpur
- Constituency No. 28 for the Chhattisgarh Legislative Assembly

Constituency details
- Country: India
- Region: Central India
- State: Chhattisgarh
- District: Bilaspur
- Lok Sabha constituency: Bilaspur
- Established: 2003
- Total electors: 243,812
- Reservation: None

Member of Legislative Assembly
- 6th Chhattisgarh Legislative Assembly
- Incumbent Dharmjeet Singh Thakur
- Party: Bharatiya Janata Party
- Elected year: 2023
- Preceded by: Rashmi Ashish Singh

Takhatpur is one of the 90 Legislative Assembly constituencies of Chhattisgarh state in India.

It comprises Takhatpur tehsil in Bilaspur district. As of 2023, its representative is Dharmjeet Singh Thakur of the Bharatiya Janata Party.

== Members of the Legislative Assembly ==
Election	Name	Party
Madhya Pradesh Legislative Assembly
1962	Murlidhar Mishra	Indian National Congress
1967	Manharan Lal Pandey	Bharatiya Jana Sangh
1972	Rohani Kumar	Indian National Congress
1977	Manharan Lal Pandey	Janata Party
1980	Taherbhai	Indian National Congress
1985	Manharan Lal Pandey	Bharatiya Janata Party
1990	Manharan Lal Pandey	Bharatiya Janata Party
1993	Manharan Lal Pandey	Bharatiya Janata Party
1998	Jagjeet Singh Makkad	Bharatiya Janata Party
Chhattisgarh Legislative Assembly
2003	Balram Singh	Indian National Congress
2008	Raju Singh Kshatri	Bharatiya Janata Party
2013	Raju Singh Kshatri	Bharatiya Janata Party
2018	Rashmi Ashish Singh	Indian National Congress
2023	Dharmjeet Singh Thakur	Bharatiya Janata Party

== Election results ==
=== 2023 ===
2023 Chhattisgarh Legislative Assembly election: Takhatpur
Party	Candidate	Votes	%	±%
BJP	Dharmjeet Singh Thakur	90,978	50.58	+22.53
INC	Rashmi Ashish Singh	76,086	42.30	+9.95
Independent	Sanjeev Khandey	3,502	1.95	
BSP	Mohan Mishra	1,938	1.08	
NOTA	None of the Above	1395	0.78	+0.22
Majority		14,892	8.28	+6.44
Turnout		179885	73.78	+0.58
BJP gain from INC		Swing		

=== 2018 ===
2018 Chhattisgarh Legislative Assembly election: Takhatpur
Party	Candidate	Votes	%	±%
INC	Rashmi Ashish Singh	52,616	32.35	
JCC	Santosh Kaushik	49,625	30.51	
BJP	Harshita Pandey	45,622	28.05	
Independent	Balram Sahu	1861	1.14	
NOTA	None of the Above	916	0.56	
Majority		2,991	1.84	
Turnout		162,638	73.20	
INC gain from BJP		Swing		

== See also ==
- List of constituencies of the Chhattisgarh Legislative Assembly
- Bilaspur district, Chhattisgarh
