= Narayanpur Assembly constituency =

Legislative Assembly constituency in Chhattisgarh State, India

Coordinates: 21.83°N 81.9°E

Narayanpur
- Constituency No. 84 for the Chhattisgarh Legislative Assembly

Constituency details
- Country: India
- Region: Central India
- State: Chhattisgarh
- District: Narayanpur
- Lok Sabha constituency: Bastar
- Established: 1952
- Total electors: 191,290
- Reservation: ST

Member of Legislative Assembly
- 6th Chhattisgarh Legislative Assembly
- Incumbent Kedar Nath Kashyap
- Party: Bhartiya Janata Party
- Elected year: 2023
- Preceded by: Chandan Kashyap

Narayanpur is one of the 90 Legislative Assembly constituencies of Chhattisgarh state in India. It is in Narayanpur district and is reserved for candidates belonging to the Scheduled Tribes. It forms a part of the Lok Sabha constituency of Bastar.

== Members of the Legislative Assembly ==
Year	Member	Party
Madhya Pradesh Legislative Assembly
1952	Rameshwar	Indian National Congress
1957	Rameshwar	Indian National Congress
1962	Ram Bharosa	Independent politician
1967	B. Jaideo	Independent politician
1972	Ratiram	Indian National Congress
1977	Gadru Ram Sori	Janata Party
1980	Shambhunath Naik	Janata Party
1985	Badri Nath Baghel	Indian National Congress
1990	Shambhu Nath Naik	Bharatiya Janata Party
1993	Vikram Singh Usendi	Bharatiya Janata Party
1998	Manturam Pawar	Indian National Congress
Chhattisgarh Legislative Assembly
2003	Vikram Usendi	Bharatiya Janata Party
2008	Kedar Nath Kashyap	Bharatiya Janata Party
2013	Kedar Nath Kashyap	Bharatiya Janata Party
2018	Chandan Kashyap	Indian National Congress
2023	Kedar Nath Kashyap	Bharatiya Janata Party

== Election results ==
=== 2023 ===
2023 Chhattisgarh Legislative Assembly election: Narayanpur
Party	Candidate	Votes	%	±%
BJP	Kedar Nath Kashyap	69,110	48.20	+5.86
INC	Chandan Kashyap	49,922	34.82	−9.52
CPI	Phulsingh Kachlam	5,606	3.91	
AAP	Narendra Kumar Nag	4,008	2.8	+0.85
BSP	Ayatu Ram Mandavi	3,488	2.43	
Independent	Sukhlal Karanga	2,148	1.50	
NOTA	None of the Above	5,381	3.75	−1.43
Majority		19,188	13.38	+11.38
Turnout		143,370	74.95	−0.08
BJP gain from INC		Swing		

=== 2018 ===
Chhattisgarh Legislative Assembly Election, 2018: Narayanpur
Party	Candidate	Votes	%	±%
INC	Chandan Kashyap	58,652	44.34	
BJP	Kedar Nath Kashyap	56,005	42.34	
Independent	Nilambar Baghel	2,696	2.04	
AAP	Narend Kumar Nag	2,576	1.95	
JCC	Baliram Kachlam	2,249	1.70	
India Praja Bandhu Party	Ramshila Mandavi	1,756	1.33	
API	Paneesh Prasad Nag	1,485	1.12	
NOTA	None of the Above	6,858	5.18	
Majority		2,647	2.0	
Turnout		131,812	75.03	
INC gain from BJP		Swing		

== See also ==
- List of constituencies of the Chhattisgarh Legislative Assembly
- Narayanpur district
