= Chintamani Maharaj =

Indian politician

Member of Parliament, Lok Sabha
- Incumbent
- Assumed office 4 June 2024
- Preceded by: Renuka Singh
- Constituency: Sarguja

Member of the Chhattisgarh Legislative Assembly
- In office 2013–2018
- Preceded by: Ramdev Ram
- Succeeded by: Pritam Ram
- Constituency: Lundra
- In office 11 December 2018 – 3 December 2023
- Preceded by: Pritam Ram
- Succeeded by: Udheshwari Paikra
- Constituency: Samri

Personal details
- Born: 19 August 1962 (age 63) Village Srikot, Balrampur district
- Party: Bharatiya Janata Party
- Other political affiliations: Indian National Congress (till 2024)
- Education: 11th Pass
- Occupation: Politician, farmer
- As of 13 June, 2018 Source: ["Biography:Maharaj, Chintamani" (PDF). Chhattisgarh Legislative Assembly.]

Chintamani Maharaj (born 19 August 1962) is an Indian politician from Chhattisgarh. He won Shashi Singhas an MP from Sarguja Lok Sabha constituency which is reserved for Scheduled Tribes (ST) candidates in Surguja District. He represented the Bharatiya Janata Party in the 2024 Indian general election in Chhattisgarh.

== Early life and education ==
Maharaj is from Srikot village, Surguja District, Chhattisgarh. He is the son of late Rameshwar Singh. He passed Class 12 in 2014 from a college affiliated with Chhattisgarh Sanskrit Vidyamandal, Rampuram.

== Career ==
Maharaj became an MLA for the first time winning the 2013 Chhattisgarh Legislative Assembly election from Lundra Assembly constituency representing the Indian National Congress In 2013, he polled 64,771 votes and defeated his nearest rival, Vijay Baba of Bharatiya Janata Party, by a margin of 9,946 votes. Later, he joined the Bharatiya Janata Party and became a Member of Parliament winning from Sarguja Lok Sabha constituency in the 2024 Indian general election in Chhattisgarh. He polled 7,13,200 votes and defeated his nearest rival, Shashi Singh of Indian National Congress, by a margin of 64,822 votes.

== See also ==
- Chhattisgarh Legislative Assembly
- 2013 Chhattisgarh Legislative Assembly election
