= Bhanpuri =

- city
- Location in Chhattisgarh, India Bhanpuri (India)
- Coordinates: 21.1°N 80.92°E
- Country: India
- State: Chhattisgarh
- District: Raipur
- Elevation: 301 m (988 ft)

Population (2001)
  - Total: 16,357

Languages
  - Official: Hindi, Chhattisgarhi
- Time zone: UTC+5:30 (IST)
- Vehicle registration: CG

Bhanpuri is a census town in Raipur District in the state of Chhattisgarh, India.

== Geography ==
Bhanpuri is located at 21.1°N 80.92°E. It has an average elevation of 301 metres (987 feet).

== Demographics ==
As of 2001 India census, Bhanpuri had a population of 16,357. Males constitute 53% of the population and females 47%. Bhanpuri has an average literacy rate of 65%, higher than the national average of 59.5%; with male literacy of 74% and female literacy of 55%. 17% of the population is under 6 years of age.
