= Bhanupratappur Assembly constituency =

Legislative Assembly constituency in Chhattisgarh State, India

Coordinates: 20.3°N 81.07°E

Bhanupratappur
- Constituency No. 80 for the Chhattisgarh Legislative Assembly

Constituency details
- Country: India
- Region: Central India
- State: Chhattisgarh
- District: Kanker
- Lok Sabha constituency: Kanker
- Established: 1961
- Total electors: 203,467
- Reservation: ST

Member of Legislative Assembly
- 6th Chhattisgarh Legislative Assembly
- Incumbent Savitri Manoj Mandavi
- Party: Indian National Congress
- Elected year: 2023
- Preceded by: Manoj Singh Mandavi

Bhanupratappur is one of the 90 Legislative Assembly constituencies of Chhattisgarh state in India.

It is part of Kanker district and is reserved for candidates belonging to the Scheduled Tribes.

== Members of the Legislative Assembly ==
Year	Member	Party
Madhya Pradesh Legislative Assembly
1962	Ram Prasad	Independent
1967	J. Hatoi	Praja Socialist Party
1972	Satyanarain Singh	Indian National Congress
1977	Pyarelal Sukhlal Singh	Janata Party
1980	Ganga Potai	Indian National Congress
1985	Ganga Potai	Indian National Congress
1990	Jhaduram Rawate	Independent
1993	Deolal Dugga	Bharatiya Janata Party
1998	Manoj Singh Mandavi	Indian National Congress
Chhattisgarh Legislative Assembly
2003	Deolal Dugga	Bharatiya Janata Party
2008	Brahmanand Netam	Bharatiya Janata Party
2013	Manoj Singh Mandavi	Indian National Congress
2018	Manoj Singh Mandavi	Indian National Congress
2022^	Savitri Manoj Mandavi	Indian National Congress
2023	Savitri Manoj Mandavi	Indian National Congress

== Election results ==
=== 2023 ===
2023 Chhattisgarh Legislative Assembly election: Bhanupratappur
Party	Candidate	Votes	%	±%
INC	Savitri Manoj Mandavi	83,931	50.63	+5.75
BJP	Gautam Uike	52,999	31.97	+1.60
AAP	Komal Hupendi	15,255	9.2	
Hamar Raj Party	Akbar Ram Korram	3,217	1.94	
NOTA	None of the Above	2,305	1.39	−1.52
Majority		30,932	18.66	+4.51
Turnout		165,777	81.48	+6.70
INC hold		Swing		

=== 2022 by-election ===
Bye-election, 2022: Bhanupratappur
Party	Candidate	Votes	%	±%
INC	Savitri Manoj Mandavi	65,479	44.88	−4.19
BJP	Bramhanand Netam	44,308	30.37	−0.64
Independent	Akbar Ram Korram	23,417	16.05	
Independent	Dinesh Kumar Kallo	3,851	2.64	
API	Shivlal Pudo	1,309	0.90	
GGP	Ghanshyam Jurri	2485	1.70	
NOTA	None of the Above	4251	2.91	
Majority		21,171	14.51	−3.55
Turnout		1,46,443	74.78	−2.80
INC hold		Swing		
INC hold		Swing		

=== 2018 ===
2018 Chhattisgarh Legislative Assembly election: Bhanupratappur
Party	Candidate	Votes	%	±%
INC	Manoj Singh Mandavi	72,520	49.07	
BJP	Deo Lal Dugga	45,827	31.01	
AAP	Komal Hupendi	9,634	6.52	
JCC	Manak Darpatti	9,611	6.5	
GGP	Siya Ram Parchapi	2,698	1.83	
SS	Shyam Lal Gawde	1,699	1.15	
API	Durga Prasad Thakur	1,565	1.06	
NOTA	None of the Above	4,235	2.87	
Majority		26,693	18.06	
Turnout		146,909	77.58	
INC hold		Swing		

== See also ==
- List of constituencies of the Chhattisgarh Legislative Assembly
- Kanker district
