= Bilha Assembly constituency =

Legislative Assembly constituency in Chhattisgarh State, India

Coordinates: 21.97°N 82.05°E

Bilha
- Constituency No. 29 for the Chhattisgarh Legislative Assembly

Constituency details
- Country: India
- Region: Central India
- State: Chhattisgarh
- District: Bilaspur
- Lok Sabha constituency: Bilaspur
- Established: 1967
- Total electors: 306,473
- Reservation: None

Member of Legislative Assembly
- 6th Chhattisgarh Legislative Assembly
- Incumbent Dharam Lal Kaushik
- Party: Bharatiya Janata Party
- Elected year: 2018

Bilha is one of the 90 Legislative Assembly constituencies of Chhattisgarh state in India. It is in Bilaspur district.

== Members of Legislative Assembly ==
Year	Member	Party
Madhya Pradesh Legislative Assembly
1967	Chitrakant Jaiswal	Indian National Congress
1972	Chitrakant Jaiswal	Indian National Congress
1977	Chitrakant Jaiswal	Indian National Congress
1980	Chitrakant Jaiswal	Indian National Congress
1985	Chitrakant Jaiswal	Indian National Congress
1990	Ashok Rao	Janata Dal
1993	Ashok Rao	Indian National Congress
1998	Dharamlal Kaushik	Bharatiya Janata Party
Chhattisgarh Legislative Assembly
2003	Siyaram Kaushik	Indian National Congress
2008	Dharamlal Kaushik	Bharatiya Janata Party
2013	Siyaram Kaushik	Indian National Congress
2018	Dharamlal Kaushik	Bharatiya Janata Party
2023	Dharamlal Kaushik	Bharatiya Janata Party

== Election results ==
=== 2018 ===
Chhattisgarh Legislative Assembly Election, 2018: Bilha
Party	Candidate	Votes	%	±%
BJP	Dharam Lal Kaushik	100,346		
NOTA	None of the Above			
Majority				
Turnout				

== See also ==
- List of constituencies of the Chhattisgarh Legislative Assembly
- Bilaspur district, Chhattisgarh
- Bilha
