= Dongargarh Assembly constituency =

Legislative Assembly constituency in Chhattisgarh State, India

Coordinates: 21.19°N 80.76°E

Dongargarh
- Constituency No. 74 for the Chhattisgarh Legislative Assembly

Constituency details
- Country: India
- Region: Central India
- State: Chhattisgarh
- District: Rajnandgaon
- Lok Sabha constituency: Rajnandgaon
- Established: 1952
- Total electors: 209,950
- Reservation: SC

Member of Legislative Assembly
- 6th Chhattisgarh Legislative Assembly
- Incumbent Harshita Swami Baghel
- Party: Indian National Congress
- Elected year: 2023
- Preceded by: Bhuneshwar Shobharam Baghel

Dongargarh is one of the 90 Legislative Assembly constituencies of Chhattisgarh state in India. It is in Rajnandgaon district and is reserved for candidates belonging to the Scheduled Castes. It is a segment of Rajnandgaon constituency in the Lok Sabha.

== Members of Assembly ==
Election	Name	Party
Madhya Pradesh Legislative Assembly
1952	Vijaylal	Indian National Congress
1957	Vijaylal	Indian National Congress
1957	Bhootnath	Indian National Congress
1962	Ganeshmal Bhandari	Indian National Congress
1967	Ganeshmal Bhandari	Indian National Congress
1972	Hiraram Ramsewak	Indian National Congress
1977	Vinayak Meshram	Janata Party
1980	Tuman Lal	Indian National Congress
1985	Dhanesh Kumar Patila	Indian National Congress
1990	Dhanesh Kumar Patila	Indian National Congress
1993	Dhanesh Kumar Patila	Indian National Congress
1998	Dhanesh Kumar Patila	Indian National Congress
Chhattisgarh Legislative Assembly
2003	Vinod Khandekar	Bharatiya Janata Party
2008	Ramji Bharti	Bharatiya Janata Party
2013	Sarojini Banjare	Bharatiya Janata Party
2018	Bhuneshwar Shobharam Baghel	Indian National Congress
2023	Harshita Swami Baghel	Indian National Congress

== Election results ==
=== 2023 ===
2023 Chhattisgarh Legislative Assembly election: Dongargarh
Party	Candidate	Votes	%	±%
INC	Harshita Swami Baghel	89,145	51.59	−2.56
BJP	Vinod Khandekar	74,778	43.27	+11.18
BSP	Bahadur Kurre	2,032	1.18	−2.18
NOTA	None of the Above	1,679	0.97	−1.46
Majority		14,367	8.32	−13.74
Turnout		172,810	82.31	−0.39
INC hold		Swing		

=== 2018 ===
2018 Chhattisgarh Legislative Assembly election: Dongargarh
Party	Candidate	Votes	%	±%
INC	Bhuneshwar Shobaram Baghel	86,949	54.15	
BJP	Sarojini Banjare	51,531	32.09	
Independent	Tarun Kumar Hathel	6,699	4.17	
BSP	Mishri Lal Markande	5,388	3.36	
NOTA	None of the Above	3,896	2.43	
Majority		35,418	22.06	
Turnout		160,127	82.7	
INC gain from BJP		Swing		

=== 2013 ===
- Sarojini Banjare (BJP): 67,158 votes
- Dr. Thaneshwar Patila (INC): 62,474 votes

=== 2003 ===
- Vinod Khandekar (BJP): 55,188 votes
- Dhanesh Patila (INC): 40,711 votes

== See also ==
- List of constituencies of the Chhattisgarh Legislative Assembly
- Rajnandgaon district
