= Samri Assembly constituency =

Legislative Assembly constituency in Chhattisgarh State, India

Coordinates: 23.41°N 83.93°E

Samri
- Constituency No. 8 for the Chhattisgarh Legislative Assembly

Constituency details
- Country: India
- Region: Central India
- State: Chhattisgarh
- District: Balrampur
- Lok Sabha constituency: Surguja
- Established: 1951
- Total electors: 218,557
- Reservation: ST

Member of Legislative Assembly
- 6th Chhattisgarh Legislative Assembly
- Incumbent Udheshwari Paikra
- Party: Bharatiya Janata Party
- Elected year: 2023
- Preceded by: Chintamani Maharaj

Samri is one of the 90 Legislative Assembly constituencies of Chhattisgarh state in India. It is in Balrampur district and is reserved for candidates belonging to the Scheduled Tribes.

== Members of Legislative Assembly ==
Year	Member	Party
Madhya Pradesh Legislative Assembly
1952	Shivbaksh Ram	Indian National Congress
1962	Jai Ram	Independent
1967	Larang Sai	Bharatiya Jana Sangh
1972	Larang Sai	Bharatiya Jana Sangh
1977	Amin Sai	Janata Party
1980	Larang Sai	Bharatiya Janata Party
1985	Maheshwar Ram	Indian National Congress
1990	Amin Sai	Bharatiya Janata Party
1993	Amin Sai	Bharatiya Janata Party
1998	Sohanlal	Bharatiya Janata Party
Chhattisgarh Legislative Assembly
2003	Siddha Nath Paikra	Bharatiya Janata Party
2008	Siddha Nath Paikra	Bharatiya Janata Party
2013	Pritam Ram	Indian National Congress
2018	Chintamani Maharaj	Indian National Congress
2023	Uddheshwari Paikra	Bharatiya Janata Party

== Election results ==
=== 2023 ===
2023 Chhattisgarh Legislative Assembly election: Ramanujganj
Party	Candidate	Votes	%	±%
BJP	Uddheshwari Paikra	83,483	45.53	+9.48
INC	Vijay Paikra	69540	37.93	−11.58
BSP	Anand Tigga	5034	2.75	−1.30
NOTA	None of the Above	4981	2.72	−1.12
Majority		29,663	16.26	−4.99
Turnout		183357	83.89	+1.58
Registered electors		218,557		
BJP gain from INC		Swing		

=== 2018 ===
Chhattisgarh Legislative Assembly Election, 2018: Samri
Party	Candidate	Votes	%	±%
INC	Chintamani Maharaj	80,620	49.51	
BJP	Sidhnath Paikra	58,697	36.05	
BSP	Mitkoo Bhagat	6,587	4.05	
NOTA	None of the Above	6,250	3.84	
Majority		21,923	13.46	
Turnout		1,62,825	82.31	
INC hold		Swing		

== See also ==
- List of constituencies of the Chhattisgarh Legislative Assembly
- Balrampur district, Chhattisgarh
