= Sihawa Assembly constituency =

Legislative Assembly constituency in Chhattisgarh State, India

Coordinates: 20.28°N 81.93°E

Sihawa
- Constituency No. 56 for the Chhattisgarh Legislative Assembly

Constituency details
- Country: India
- Region: Central India
- State: Chhattisgarh
- District: Dhamtari
- Lok Sabha constituency: Kanker
- Established: 2003
- Total electors: 193,736
- Reservation: ST

Member of Legislative Assembly
- 6th Chhattisgarh Legislative Assembly
- Incumbent Ambika Markam
- Party: Indian National Congress
- Elected year: 2023

Sihawa is one of the 90 Legislative Assembly constituencies of Chhattisgarh state in India.

It is part of Dhamtari district and is reserved for candidates belonging to the Scheduled Tribes.

== Members of the Legislative Assembly ==
Year	Member	Party
Madhya Pradesh Legislative Assembly
Before 1961: Constituency did not exist
1962	Narayan Singh	Bharatiya Jana Sangh
1967	Pusauram	Indian National Congress
1972	Pusauram	Indian National Congress
1977	Madhav Laxman	Janata Party
1980	Ram Nath	Indian National Congress
1985	Ashok Som	Indian National Congress
1990	Madhav Singh Dhruw	Indian National Congress
1993	Madhav Singh Dhruw	Indian National Congress
1998	Madhav Singh Dhruw	Indian National Congress
Chhattisgarh Legislative Assembly
2003	Pinky Dhruw	Bharatiya Janata Party
2008	Ambika Markam	Indian National Congress
2013	Shravan Markam	Bharatiya Janata Party
2018	Dr. Lakshmi Dhruw	Indian National Congress
2023	Ambika Markam	Indian National Congress

== Election results ==
=== 2023 ===
2023 Chhattisgarh Legislative Assembly election: Sihawa
Party	Candidate	Votes	%	±%
INC	Ambika Markam	84,891	49.81	−6.64
BJP	Shrawan Markam	71,725	42.08	+14.63
Hamar Raj Party	Jeewrakhan Marai	4,492	2.64	New
Independent	Manmohan Singh Bisen	1,821	1.07	
Bharatiya Shakti Chetna Party	Domar Singh Netam	1,623	0.95	New
GGP	Devchandra Uike	1,579	0.93	−4.26
NOTA	None of the Above	3574	2.10	−0.65
Majority		13,166	7.73	−21.27
Turnout		170,445	87.98	+5.30
INC hold		Swing		

=== 2018 ===
Chhattisgarh Legislative Assembly Election, 2018: Sihawa
Party	Candidate	Votes	%	±%
INC	Dr. Lakshmi Dhruw	88,451	56.45	
BJP	Pinky Shivaraj Shah	43,015	27.45	
GGP	Vinod Kumar Nagvanshi	8,126	5.19	
Independent	Makhan Lal Markam	4,729	3.02	
JCC	Shantanu Som	2,312	1.48	
AAP	Akbar Mandavi	1,544	0.99	
NOTA	None of the Above	4,306	2.75	
Majority		45,436	29.00	
Turnout		156,695	82.68	
INC gain from BJP		Swing		

== See also ==
- List of constituencies of the Chhattisgarh Legislative Assembly
- Dhamtari district
- Sihawa
