= Pratima Chandrakar =

Indian politician

Personal details
- Born: Chhattisgarh, India
- Party: Indian National Congress

Pratima Chandrakar is a politician from the Indian National Congress party. She was a Member of the Chhattisgarh Legislative Assembly representing Durg Rural Assembly constituency.
