= Sakti Assembly constituency =

Legislative Assembly constituency in Chhattisgarh State, India

Coordinates: 22.02°N 82.96°E

Sakti
- Constituency No. 35 for the Chhattisgarh Legislative Assembly

Constituency details
- Country: India
- Region: Central India
- State: Chhattisgarh
- District: Sakti
- Lok Sabha constituency: Janjgir-Champa
- Established: 2003
- Total electors: 214,392
- Reservation: None

Member of Legislative Assembly
- 6th Chhattisgarh Legislative Assembly
- Incumbent Charan Das Mahant
- Party: Indian National Congress
- Elected year: 2023

Sakti is one of the 90 Legislative Assembly constituencies of Chhattisgarh state in India.

It comprises Sakti tehsil and parts of Champa tehsil, in Sakti district.

== Members of the Legislative Assembly ==
Election	Name	Party
Madhya Pradesh Legislative Assembly
1952	Rajbahudur Leeladhar Singh	Independent politician
1957	Rajbahudur Leeladhar Singh	Praja Socialist Party
1962	Tankrajeshwari	Indian National Congress
1967	I. Devi	Indian National Congress
1972	Pushpendranath Singh	Independent politician
1977	Raja Surendra Bahadur Singh	Indian National Congress
1980	Raja Surendra Bahadur Singh	Indian National Congress
1985	Raja Surendra Bahadur Singh	Indian National Congress
1990	Pushpendra Bahadur Singh	Bharatiya Janata Party
1993	Raja Surendra Bahadur Singh	Indian National Congress
1998	Megharam Sahu	Bharatiya Janata Party
Chhattisgarh Legislative Assembly
2003	Megharam Sahu	Bharatiya Janata Party
2008	Saroja Manharan Rathore	Indian National Congress
2013	Doctor Khilawan Sahu	Bharatiya Janata Party
2018	Charan Das Mahant	Indian National Congress
2023	Charan Das Mahant	Indian National Congress

== Election results ==
=== 2023 ===
Chhattisgarh Legislative Assembly Election, 2023: Sakti
Party	Candidate	Votes	%	±%
INC	Charan Das Mahant	81,519	50.56	−2.01
BJP	Khilawan Sahu	69,124	42.88	+10.55
GGP	Bhaiya Jitendra Chauhan	3,464	2.15	
AAP	Anubhav Tiwari	2,752	1.71	+1.38
NOTA	None of the Above	909	0.56	−0.15
Majority		12,395	7.68	−12.56
Turnout		161,218	75.20	−0.24
INC hold		Swing		

=== 2018 ===
Chhattisgarh Legislative Assembly Election, 2018: Sakti
Party	Candidate	Votes	%	±%
INC	Charan Das Mahant	78,058	52.57	
BJP	Medha Ram Sahu	48,012	32.33	
BSP	Gautam Rathore	13,907	9.37	
NOTA	None of the Above	1,057	0.71	
Majority		30,046	20.24	
Turnout		148,495	75.44	
INC gain from BJP		Swing		

== See also ==
- List of constituencies of the Chhattisgarh Legislative Assembly
- Janjgir-Champa district
