= Ambikapur Assembly constituency =

Legislative Assembly constituency in Chhattisgarh State, India

Coordinates: 23.13°N 83.18°E

Ambikapur
- Constituency No. 10 for the Chhattisgarh Legislative Assembly

Constituency details
- Country: India
- Region: Central India
- State: Chhattisgarh
- Division: Surguja
- District: Surguja
- Lok Sabha constituency: Surguja
- Established: 1951
- Total electors: 256,691
- Reservation: None

Member of Legislative Assembly
- 6th Chhattisgarh Legislative Assembly
- Incumbent Rajesh Agarwal
- Party: Bharatiya Janata Party
- Elected year: 2023
- Preceded by: T. S. Singh Deo

Ambikapur is one of the 90 Legislative Assembly constituencies of Chhattisgarh state in India. It is in Surguja district.

== Members of Legislative Assembly ==
| Year | Member | Party |
Madhya Pradesh Legislative Assembly
| 1952 | Parasnath Thakur | Indian National Congress |
| 1957 | Brij Bhushan | Indian National Congress |
| 1962 | Amresh Prasad | Independent |
| 1967 | S Tripathi | Indian National Congress |
| 1972 | Devendra Kumari Singh Deo | Indian National Congress |
| 1977 | Prabhunarayan Tripathi | Janata Party |
| 1980 | Madan Gopal Singh | Indian National Congress |
| 1985 | Madan Gopal Singh | Indian National Congress |
| 1990 | Madan Gopal Singh | Indian National Congress |
| 1993 | Madan Gopal Singh | Indian National Congress |
| 1998 | Madan Gopal Singh | Indian National Congress |
Chhattisgarh Legislative Assembly
| 2003 | Kamalbhan Singh Marabi | Bharatiya Janata Party |
| 2008 | T. S. Singh Deo | Indian National Congress |
| 2013 | T. S. Singh Deo | Indian National Congress |
| 2018 | T. S. Singh Deo | Indian National Congress |
| 2023 | Rajesh Agrawal | Bharatiya Janata Party |

== Election results ==
=== Assembly Election 2023 ===
2023 Chhattisgarh Legislative Assembly election : Ambikapur
| Party | Candidate | Votes | % | ±% |
|---|---|---|---|---|
| BJP | Rajesh Agrawal | 90,780 | 46.86% | ▲12.72 |
| INC | T. S. Singh Deo | 90,686 | 46.81% | ▼9.58 |
| GGP | Balsai Korram | 6,083 | 3.14% | ▲0.64 |
| NOTA | None of the Above | 2,168 | 1.12% | ▲0.78 |
| Independent | Rakesh Kumar Sahu | 1,318 | 0.68% | New |
| JCC | Abdul Majid | 1,193 | 0.62% | New |
| Margin of victory | | 94 | 0.05% | ▼22.19 |
| Turnout | | 1,93,746 | 76.37% | ▼3.34 |
| Registered electors | | 2,56,691 | | ▲13.57 |
| BJP gain from INC | | Swing | ▼9.53 | |

=== Assembly Election 2018 ===
2018 Chhattisgarh Legislative Assembly election : Ambikapur
| Party | Candidate | Votes | % | ±% |
|---|---|---|---|---|
| INC | T. S. Singh Deo | 100,439 | 56.38% | ▲3.35 |
| BJP | Anurag Singh Deo | 60,815 | 34.14% | ▼6.65 |
| GGP | Gopal Prasad Gupta | 4,459 | 2.50% | ▲0.94 |
| Independent | Tarun Kumar Bhagat | 2,173 | 1.22% | New |
| Independent | Kranti Kumar Rawat | 2,103 | 1.18% | New |
| BSP | Sita Ram Das | 1,322 | 0.74% | ▼0.30 |
| Independent | T. S. Singh Deo | 1,075 | 0.60% | New |
| NOTA | None of the Above | 609 | 0.34% | ▼2.37 |
| Margin of victory | | 39,624 | 22.24% | ▲9.99 |
| Turnout | | 1,78,140 | 79.13% | ▲0.26 |
| Registered electors | | 2,26,012 | | ▲11.22 |
| INC hold | | Swing | ▲3.35 | |

=== Assembly Election 2013 ===
2013 Chhattisgarh Legislative Assembly election : Ambikapur
| Party | Candidate | Votes | % | ±% |
|---|---|---|---|---|
| INC | T. S. Singh Deo | 84,668 | 53.03% | ▲10.92 |
| BJP | Anurag Singh Deo | 65,110 | 40.78% | ▼0.59 |
| NOTA | None of the Above | 4,327 | 2.71% | New |
| GGP | Sewa Ram Porte | 2,503 | 1.57% | ▼3.00 |
| Independent | Adhiwakta Vijay Tiwari | 1,917 | 1.20% | New |
| BSP | Ram Das Toppo | 1,670 | 1.05% | ▼0.65 |
| Margin of victory | | 19,558 | 12.25% | ▲11.51 |
| Turnout | | 1,59,646 | 80.83% | ▲7.84 |
| Registered electors | | 2,03,212 | | ▲7.99 |
| INC hold | | Swing | ▲10.92 | |

=== Assembly Election 2008 ===
2008 Chhattisgarh Legislative Assembly election : Ambikapur
| Party | Candidate | Votes | % | ±% |
|---|---|---|---|---|
| INC | T. S. Singh Deo | 56,043 | 42.11% | ▲18.94 |
| BJP | Anurag Singh Deo | 55,063 | 41.37% | ▼11.97 |
| GGP | Jainath Keram | 6,078 | 4.57% | New |
| CPI | Amar Nath Pandey | 2,885 | 2.17% | New |
| Independent | Ramnayak Maurya | 2,698 | 2.03% | New |
| BSP | Kumkum Bhatnagar | 2,258 | 1.70% | ▼1.55 |
| Independent | Jhamekeshwar Paikra | 1,392 | 1.05% | New |
| Margin of victory | | 980 | 0.74% | ▼29.44 |
| Turnout | | 1,33,083 | 70.98% | ▲3.72 |
| Registered electors | | 1,88,173 | | ▲2.20 |
| INC gain from BJP | | Swing | ▼11.24 | |

=== Assembly Election 2003 ===
2003 Chhattisgarh Legislative Assembly election : Ambikapur
| Party | Candidate | Votes | % | ±% |
|---|---|---|---|---|
| BJP | Kamal Bhan Singh | 65,812 | 53.35% | New |
| INC | Madan Gopal Singh | 28,590 | 23.18% | New |
| NCP | Prabodh Minj | 14,568 | 11.81% | New |
| BSP | Gurusharan Singh Painkara | 4,011 | 3.25% | New |
| Independent | Fuleswari Singh | 3,935 | 3.19% | New |
| SP | Ganjha Ram Thakur | 2,977 | 2.41% | New |
| JMM | Bansidhar Urawan | 1,406 | 1.14% | New |
| Margin of victory | | 37,222 | 30.17% | |
| Turnout | | 1,23,363 | 67.00% | |
| Registered electors | | 1,84,121 | | |
| BJP win (new seat) | | | | |

== See also ==
- List of constituencies of the Chhattisgarh Legislative Assembly
- Surguja district
