= Lundra Assembly constituency =

Legislative Assembly constituency in Chhattisgarh State, India

Coordinates: 23.13°N 83.41°E

Lundra
- Constituency No. 9 for the Chhattisgarh Legislative Assembly

Constituency details
- Country: India
- Region: Central India
- State: Chhattisgarh
- Division: Surguja
- District: Surguja
- Lok Sabha constituency: Surguja
- Established: 1961
- Total electors: 193,902
- Reservation: ST

Member of Legislative Assembly
- 6th Chhattisgarh Legislative Assembly
- Incumbent Praboj Bhinj
- Party: Bharatiya Janata Party
- Elected year: 2023
- Preceded by: Pritam Ram

Lundra is one of the 90 Legislative Assembly constituencies of Chhattisgarh state in India. It is in Surguja district and is reserved for candidates belonging to the Scheduled Tribes.

== Members of the Legislative Assembly ==
| Year | Member | Party |
Madhya Pradesh Legislative Assembly
| 1962 | Atmaram Ingole | Bharatiya Jana Sangh |
| 1967 | C Birsai | Indian National Congress |
| 1972 | Chamru Ram | Indian National Congress |
| 1977 | Asan Ram | Janata Party |
| 1980 | Bhola Singh | Indian National Congress |
| 1985 | Bhola Singh | Indian National Congress |
| 1990 | Ram Kishun | Bharatiya Janata Party |
| 1993 | Bhola Singh | Indian National Congress |
| 1998 | Ramdev Ram | Indian National Congress |
Chhattisgarh Legislative Assembly
| 2003 | Vijay Nath | Bharatiya Janata Party |
| 2008 | Ramdev Ram | Indian National Congress |
| 2013 | Chintamani Maharaj | Indian National Congress |
| 2018 | Pritam Ram | Indian National Congress |
| 2023 | Prabodh Minz | Bharatiya Janata Party |

== Election results ==
=== 2023 ===
2023 Chhattisgarh Legislative Assembly election: Lundra
| Party | Candidate | Votes | % | ±% |
|---|---|---|---|---|
| BJP | Prabodh Minz | 87,463 | 52.82 | +16.22 |
| INC | Dr. Pritam Ram | 63,335 | 38.25 | −12.96 |
| AAP | Alexander Kerketta | 2,599 | 1.57 | −0.10 |
| NOTA | None of the Above | 2,906 | 1.76 | +0.03 |
| Majority | | 24,128 | 14.57 | −0.04 |
| Turnout | | 165,582 | 85.39 | −0.55 |
| Registered electors | | 193,902 | | |
| BJP gain from INC | | Swing | | |

=== 2018 ===
Chhattisgarh Legislative Assembly Election, 2018: Lundra
| Party | Candidate | Votes | % | ±% |
|---|---|---|---|---|
| INC | Pritam Ram | 77,773 | 51.21 | |
| BJP | Vijaynath Singh | 55,594 | 36.60 | |
| BSP | Sumitra Singh Paikra | 1,949 | 1.28 | |
| NOTA | None of the Above | 2,626 | 1.73 | |
| Majority | | 22,179 | 14.61 | |
| Turnout | | 1,51,880 | 85.94 | |
| INC hold | | Swing | | |
