= Pritam Ram =

Indian politician

Member of the Chhattisgarh Legislative Assembly
- In office 2018–2023
- Preceded by: Chintamani Maharaj
- Succeeded by: Prabodh Minz
- Constituency: Lundra
- In office 2013–2018
- Preceded by: Siddha Nath Paikra
- Succeeded by: Chintamani Maharaj
- Constituency: Samri

Personal details
- Born: 1 July 1959 (age 66) Village Rajpur, Balrampur district
- Party: Indian National Congress
- Education: MBBS
- Occupation: Politician
- As of 13 June, 2018 Source: ["Biography:Ram, Pritam" (PDF). Chhattisgarh Legislative Assembly.]

Dr. Pritam Ram (born 1 July 1959) is an Indian Politician. He was the MLA in Chhattisgarh from The Indian National Congress.

== Political career ==
He has been the president of District Medical Administrators Association and a member of Indian Medical Association, Ambikapur Branch.

He became an MLA in Chhattisgarh for the first time from Samri (Vidhan Sabha constituency) in 2013.

== See also ==
- Chhattisgarh Legislative Assembly
- 2013 Chhattisgarh Legislative Assembly election
