= List of Monuments of National Importance in Chhattisgarh =

This is a list of Monuments of National Importance (Asian) as officially recognized by and available through the website of the Archaeological Survey of India in the state of Chhattisgarh. The monument identifier is a combination of the abbreviation of the subdivision of the list (state, ASI circle) and the numbering as published on the website of the ASI. 46 Monuments of National Importance have been recognized by the ASI in Chhattisgarh. Subsequently one monument from previous list was substituted by another.

== List of monuments of national importance ==
SL. No.	Description	Location	Address	District	Coordinates	Image
N-CT-1	Mahadev Temple including math of Bairagi and Mandapa	Narainpur		Balodabazar Bhatapara	21°34′34″N 82°22′14″E	Mahadev Temple including math of Bairagi and Mandapa
N-CT-2	The temple belonging to Mahant Laldass of Sheorinarayan	Narainpur		Balodabazar Bhatapara	21°34′34″N 82°22′13″E	The temple belonging to Mahant Laldass of Sheorinarayan
N-CT-3	Mahadeo Temple	Bastar		Bastar	19°12′44″N 81°55′58″E	Mahadeo Temple
N-CT-4	Narayan Temple	Narayanpal		Bastar	19°11′34″N 81°44′40″E	Narayan Temple
N-CT-5	Old temple of Sita Devi and Sati pillar	Deorbija		Bemetara	21°40′11″N 81°24′22″E	Old temple of Sita Devi and Sati pillar
N-CT-6	Ardhanariswara Image	Bhairam Deo Gudi		Bijapur	18°59′43″N 81°03′27″E	Upload Photo
N-CT-7	Bhima-kichak temple	Malhar		Gaurela-Pendra-Marwahi	22°42′23″N 81°47′02″E	Bhima-kichak temple
N-CT-8	Narmadeshwar Mahadev Temple	Belpan		Bilaspur	22°12′41″N 81°52′22″E	Upload Photo
N-CT-9	Shiv Temple	Gatoura		Bilaspur	22°04′08″N 82°15′30″E	Upload Photo
N-CT-10	Malhar Fort	Malhar		Bilaspur	21°53′50″N 82°16′37″E	Upload Photo
N-CT-11	Pateleswar Mahadev temple including all ancient remains of other temples close by, together with various sculptures of Brahmanical, Buddhist and Jain pantheons and inscriptions, carved and uncarved stones discovered	Malhar		Bilaspur	21°53′43″N 82°16′48″E	Pateleswar Mahadev temple including all ancient remains of other temples close by, together with various sculptures of Brahmanical, Buddhist and Jain pantheons and inscriptions, carved and uncarved stones discovered
N-CT-12	Kanthi Dewal Temple	Ratanpur		Bilaspur	22°17′20″N 82°09′36″E	Kanthi Dewal Temple
N-CT-13	The fine doorway built into the ruined wall beside the north gateway to the fort and the carved stones and images lying about within the boundaries of the village	Ratanpur		Bilaspur	22°17′07″N 82°10′02″E	The fine doorway built into the ruined wall beside the north gateway to the fort and the carved stones and images lying about within the boundaries of the village More images
N-CT-14	Sandstone Shiva temple	Deobaloda		Durg	21°13′08″N 81°28′25″E	Sandstone Shiva temple
N-CT-15	Group of temples known as the Rajiva Lochana or Rajim Temples	Rajim		Gariaband	20°57′50″N 81°52′39″E	Group of temples known as the Rajiva Lochana or Rajim Temples
N-CT-16	Sita Baree	Rajim		Gariaband	20°57′48″N 81°52′35″E	Sita Baree
N-CT-17	Temple of Ramchandra	Rajim		Gariaband	20°57′48″N 81°52′44″E	Temple of Ramchandra
N-CT-18	Ashtabhuji Temple	Adbhar		Janjgir Champa	21°57′11″N 83°01′29″E	Ashtabhuji Temple More images
N-CT-19	Kashigarh fort	Kashigarh		Janjgir Champa	21°51′10″N 82°47′06″E	Upload Photo
N-CT-20	Larger Vishnu temple	Janjgir		Janjgir Champa	22°00′21″N 82°34′20″E	Larger Vishnu temple More images
N-CT-21	Smaller Vishnu Temple	Janjgir		Janjgir Champa	22°00′23″N 82°34′20″E	Smaller Vishnu Temple More images
N-CT-22	Brick Temple of Shabari	Kharod		Janjgir Champa	21°44′26″N 82°34′41″E	Brick Temple of Shabari
N-CT-23	Andaldeo Temple	Kharod		Janjgir Champa	21°44′48″N 82°34′47″E	Andaldeo Temple
N-CT-24	Kotmi Fort	Kotmi		Janjgir Champa	22°01′43″N 82°20′32″E	Upload Photo
N-CT-25	Kotgarh	Near Bargawan		Janjgir Champa	22°03′02″N 82°26′03″E	Upload Photo
N-CT-26	Half ruined temple of Kesava Narayan	Sheori Narayan		Janjgir Champa	21°43′09″N 82°35′25″E	Upload Photo
N-CT-27	The Sheorinarayana Temple, together with ruined brick temples in the same compound and the inscription built into the wall of the Chandrachuda temple	Sheori Narayan		Janjgir Champa	21°43′10″N 82°35′24″E	Upload Photo
N-CT-28	Brick mound	Gadh Dhanora		Kondagaon	20°04′20″N 81°33′18″E	Upload Photo
N-CT-29	Chaiturgarh	Close to Bagdara		Korba	22°30′37″N 82°16′17″E	Chaiturgarh
N-CT-30	Mahadeo Temple	Pali		Korba	22°22′23″N 82°19′25″E	Mahadeo Temple
N-CT-31	Bankeshwar mahadev temple and mounds of sculptured and unsculptured stones	Tuman		Korba	22°34′29″N 82°25′20″E	Bankeshwar mahadev temple and mounds of sculptured and unsculptured stones
N-CT-32	Monuments & Temples	Sirpur		Mahasamund	21°21′11″N 82°11′12″E	Monuments & Temples
N-CT-33	Where the monuments are to be found and the mound to the east of Arang	Sirpur		Mahasamund	21°20′48″N 82°10′55″E	Where the monuments are to be found and the mound to the east of Arang
N-CT-34	The Pali inscription stone	Samarsal		Mungeli	22°10′01″N 81°47′23″E	Upload Photo
N-CT-35	Bhand Dewal	Arang		Raipur	21°11′42″N 81°58′10″E	Bhand Dewal More images
N-CT-36	Shiv Mandir	Gandai-Pandaria		Khairagarh-Chhuikhadan-Gandai district	21°39′54″N 81°06′24″E	Shiv Mandir
N-CT-37	Sita Bengra caves	Ramagarh hill		Sarguja	22°53′55″N 82°55′50″E	Sita Bengra caves
N-CT-38	Jogimara Caves	Ramagarh hill		Sarguja	22°53′35″N 82°54′19″E	Jogimara Caves
N-CT-39	Ganesh statues	Barsur		Dantewada	19°08′03″N 81°22′25″E	Ganesh statues More images
N-CT-40	Ancient sculpture in Danteswari Temple	Barsur		Dantewada	19°08′10″N 81°22′41″E	Ancient sculpture in Danteswari Temple
N-CT-41	Chandraditya Temple	Barsur		Dantewada	19°08′14″N 81°22′58″E	Chandraditya Temple
N-CT-42	Mamabhanjaka Temple	Barsur		Dantewada	19°08′16″N 81°22′25″E	Mamabhanjaka Temple
N-CT-43	Danteswari Devi Temple	Dantewada		Dantewada	18°53′48″N 81°20′41″E	Danteswari Devi Temple
N-CT-44	Kamma Memorial or Urasgattta Post	Dhilmil		Dantewada	18°59′51″N 81°44′04″E	Upload Photo
N-CT-45	Megalithic site containing uraskals	Gammewada		Dantewada	18°48′42″N 81°18′37″E	Upload Photo
N-CT-46	Karli Mahadeo Temple	Samlur		Dantewada	18°58′36″N 81°18′13″E	Upload Photo

== See also ==
- List of Monuments of National Importance in India for other Monuments of National Importance in India
- List of State Protected Monuments in Chhattisgarh
