= Bindranawagarh Assembly constituency =

Legislative Assembly constituency in Chhattisgarh State, India

Coordinates: 19.98°N 82.49°E

Bindranawagarh
- Constituency No. 55 for the Chhattisgarh Legislative Assembly

Constituency details
- Country: India
- Region: Central India
- State: Chhattisgarh
- District: Gariaband
- Lok Sabha constituency: Mahasamund
- Established: 1951
- Total electors: 226,593
- Reservation: ST

Member of Legislative Assembly
- 6th Chhattisgarh Legislative Assembly
- Incumbent Janak Dhruw
- Party: Indian National Congress
- Elected year: 2023

Bindranawagarh is one of the 90 Legislative Assembly constituencies of Chhattisgarh state in India. It is part of Gariaband district and is reserved for candidates belonging to Scheduled Tribes.

== Members of the Legislative Assembly ==
Year	Member	Party
Madhya Pradesh Legislative Assembly
Before 1956: Constituency did not exist
1957	Shyama Kumar	Indian National Congress
1957	Shyama Charan Shukla	Indian National Congress
1962	Kham Singh	Praja Socialist Party
1967	K. Komarra	Bharatiya Jana Sangh
1972	Parwati K. P. Shah	Independent politician
1977	Balram Jugsay	Janata Party
1980	Balram Jugsay	Bharatiya Janta Party
1985	Ishwarsingh	Indian National Congress
1990	Balram Pujari	Bharatiya Janta Party
1993	Omkar Shah	Indian National Congress
1998	Charan Singh Manjhi	Bharatiya Janta Party
Chhattisgarh Legislative Assembly
2003	Omkar Shah	Indian National Congress
2008	Damarudhar Pujari	Bharatiya Janata Party
2013	Govardhan Singh Manjhi	Bharatiya Janata Party
2018	Damarudhar Pujari	Bharatiya Janata Party
2023	Janak Dhruw	Indian National Congress

== Election results ==
=== 2023 ===
2023 Chhattisgarh Legislative Assembly election: Bindranawagarh
Party	Candidate	Votes	%	±%
INC	Janak Dhruw	92,639	47.48	+9.16
BJP	Gowardhan Singh Manjhi	91,823	47.06	+2.96
Bharatiya Shakti Chetna Party	Jeevan Lal Dhruw	2,619	1.34	
NOTA	None of the Above	3,710	1.90	−1.15
Majority		816	0.42	−5.36
Turnout		195,124	86.11	+0.41
INC gain from BJP		Swing		

=== 2018 ===
Chhattisgarh Legislative Assembly Election, 2018: Bindranawagarh
Party	Candidate	Votes	%	±%
BJP	Damarudhar Pujari	79,619	44.10	
INC	Sanjay Netam	69,189	38.32	
GGP	Onkar Shah	19,022	10.54	
BSP	Devendra Thakur	2,752	1.52	
AAP	Siyaram Nagesh	2,378	1.32	
CPI(M)	Bhojlal Netam	2,083	1.15	
NOTA	None of the Above	5,515	3.05	
Majority		10,430	5.78	
Turnout		180,558	85.70	
BJP hold		Swing		

== See also ==
- List of constituencies of the Chhattisgarh Legislative Assembly
- Gariaband district
