= National Highway 130C (India) =

National highway in India

National Highway 130C
- Route of the National Highway in red

Route information
- Auxiliary route of NH 30
- Length: 219 km (136 mi)

Major junctions
- North end: Abhanpur
- South end: Baldhimal

Location
- Country: India
- States: Odisha, Chhattisgarh

Highway system
- Roads in India; Expressways; National; State; Asian
← NH 30	→ NH 26

National Highway 130C, commonly referred to as NH 130C is a national highway in India. It is a spur road of National Highway 30. NH-130C traverses the states of Chhattisgarh and Odisha in India.

== Route ==
Chhattisgarh

Abhanpur, Rajim, Gariaband, Bardula, Deobhog - Odisha Border.

Odisha

Chhattisgarh Border - Baldhimal.

== Junctions ==
NH 30 Terminal near Abhanpur.
NH 26 Terminal near Baldhimal.

== See also ==
- List of national highways in India
- List of national highways in India by state
