= Janak Dhruw =

Indian politician

Member of Chhattisgarh Legislative Assembly
- Incumbent
- Assumed office 2023
- Preceded by: Damarudhar Pujari
- Constituency: Bindrawagarh

Personal details
- Party: Indian National Congress
- Profession: Politician

Janak Ram Dhruw (born 1965) is an Indian politician from Chhattisgarh. He is an MLA from Bindrawagarh Assembly constituency, which is a reserved constituency for Scheduled Tribes community, in Gariaband district. He won the 2023 Chhattisgarh Legislative Assembly election, representing the Indian National Congress.

== Early life and education ==
Dhruw is from Bindrawagarh, Gariaband district, Chhattisgarh. He is son of Abheram Dhruw. He completed his post graduation in history in 1990 at Pandit Ravishankar Shukla University, Raipur.

== Career ==
Dhruw won Bindrawagarh Assembly constituency representing the Indian National Congress in the 2023 Chhattisgarh Legislative Assembly election. He polled 92,639 votes and defeated his nearest rival, Gowardhan Singh Manjhi of the Bharatiya Janata Party, by a narrow margin of 816 votes.

In March 2024, the Congress MLA from a naxal affected region returned his security personnel, alleging that the district administration had not provided him with an official residence. He blamed the BJP government, stating that he was sending the personnel back due to the lack of accommodation for them.
