= Ramachandra Temple =

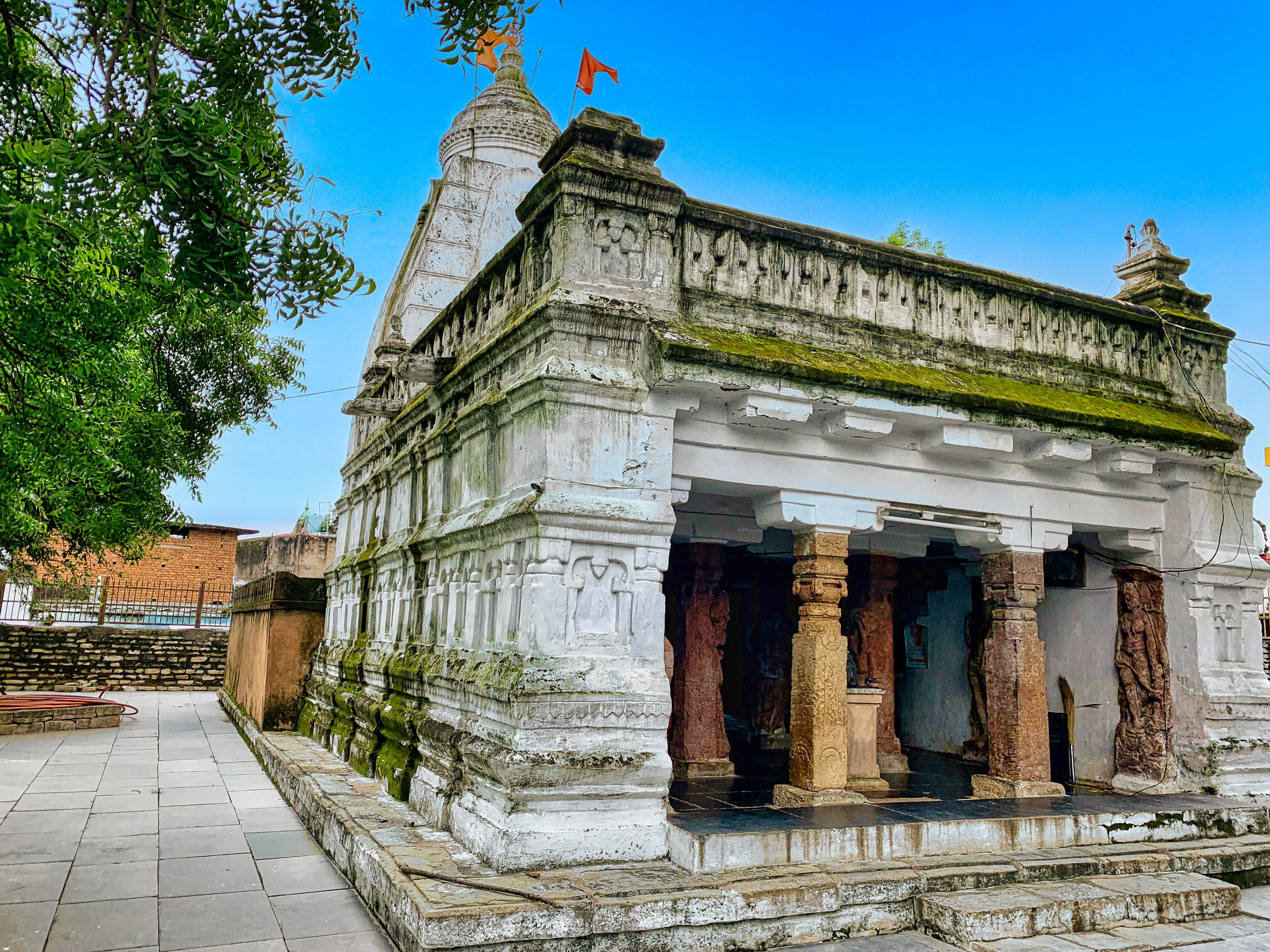

Religion
- Affiliation: Hinduism

Location
- Location: Rajim, Gariaband district, Chhattisgarh
- Country: India
- Geographic coordinates: 20°57′48″N 81°52′44″E

Ramachandra Temple is a temple located in Rajim, in the Indian state of Chhattisgarh.

== History ==
The date of construction of the temple is not known. Alexander Cunningham states, in his 1884 report that the temple had been built by Govind Lal, a merchant about 250 or 400 years ago. This would correspond to either the 17th or 15th century CE.

== Structure ==
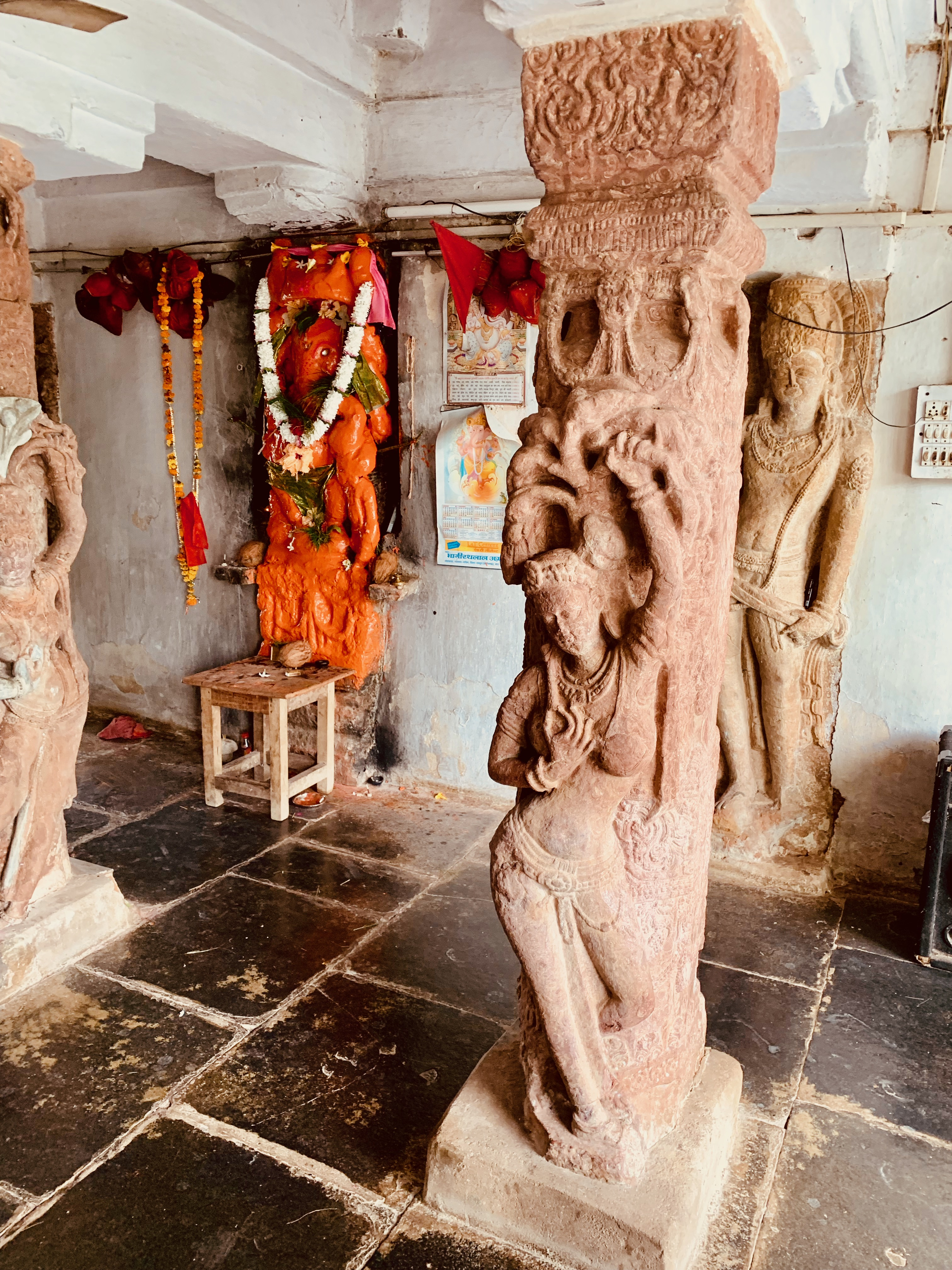
Interior

The temple is located on a plinth, similar to the Rajiv Lochan Temple. The plinth is built out of stone, while the temple itself is a plastered brick structure.

=== Mandapa ===
The roof of the mandapa is supported by two rows of five pillars each. Corresponding to these, there are five pilasters on each of the side walls, thus making for a total of ten pillars and ten pilasters.

It is quite evident that the pillars and pilasters of the temple are much older than the temple itself, dating to the 7th century CE. These, in all probability, have been brought from the ruins of Sirpur. Due to the presence of two different images of Ganga, Cunningham notes that the ruins of two different temples must have been incorporated, since a temple does not typically have twin representations of Ganga.

Four of the pillars have large, monolithic carved figures. Two have female figures, while another also has a female figure holding a branch of a tree. The fourth has a couple, consisting of a male and female figure, with an overhead mango tree containing a monkey.

=== Sanctum ===
The entrance to the sanctum consists of an earlier doorframe with three sakhas (doorjambs), within a later doorframe with four sakhas. The earlier doorway displays Vakataka influence in its design. The base of its outer doorjambs on the right is a squatting Yaksha, with its counterpart on the left being defaced. The later doorframe is dated to about the 17th century.
