= Stefano Caselli =

Italian professor of banking and finance (born 1969)

- Born: June 14, 1969 (age 57); Chiavari, Italy
- Education: Università di Genoa, Università di Siena
- Occupations: Professor of Banking and Finance, Dean of SDA Bocconi School of Management
- Known for: Banking and finance, academic leadership

Stefano Caselli (born 14 June 1969) is an Italian economist and professor of banking and finance and the Dean of SDA Bocconi School of Management. He is the author of several books on finances and capital markets.

== Early life and education ==
Stefano Caselli was born in Chiavari on 14 June 1969. In 1993, he earned a degree in Economics from the Università di Genoa and in 1998 completed a PhD in Finance at the Università di Siena.

== Career ==
Since 2007, Caselli is a professor of banking and finance at Bocconi University. In 2008, he began writing as a columnist for Corriere della Sera's Economia weekly edition.

From 2012 to 2022, he served as Vice-Rector for international affairs at Bocconi University. During his tenure, he dealt with the development of international networks, including CEMS, The Global Alliance in Management Education, and the launch of CIVICA, the European University of Social Sciences.

In 2019, Caselli was appointed to the Algebris Chair in Long-Term Investment and Absolute Return at Bocconi University. In November 2022, he became the Dean of SDA Bocconi School of Management which was subsequently ranked third in the FT Global MBA Ranking 2024. Caselli works as a director on several boards of corporations and financial institutions including Generali Real Estate SGR S.p.A. from 2012 to 2024, SIAS S.p.A. from 2012 to 2020, Credito Valtellinese S.p.A. from 2018 to 2021, and UnipolSai S.p.A. since 2022.

In March 2024, Caselli joined the Committee for the Reform of Capital Markets at the Ministry of Economy and Finance (MEF) of Italy, which started its work with a yearly mandate. He also serves on the board of ISBM, International Schools of Business Management, a non-profit organization established in 1977.

== Books ==
- Caselli Stefano, Stefano Gatti: Capital Markets: Perspectives over the Last Decade. Bocconi University Press, 1 July 2023. ISBN 978-8831322850
- Caselli Stefano, Giulia Negri: Private Equity and Venture Capital in Europe: Markets, Techniques, and Dealsi. Academic Press, 28 Mar 2021. ISBN 978-0-323-85812-0
- Caselli Stefano, Stefano Gatti: Structured Finance: Techniques, Products and Market. Springer Science & Business Media, 4 Oct 2005. ISBN 978-3-540-28139-9
