= Deobhog =

Deobhog Deobhog
- Nagar Panchayat
- Devbhog
- Location in Chhattisgarh, India
- Coordinates: 19.89645275767654°N 82.65931201493562°E
- Country: India
- State: Chhattisgarh
- District: Gariaband

Deobhog is a town and Nagar Panchayat located in the Gariaband district of Chhattisgarh state of India. It was upgraded from a Gram Panchayat to a Nagar Panchayat in September 2024, following a notification from the Government of Chhattisgarh.

It is situated in the eastern part of the district, near the border with Odisha. Historically a rural settlement governed by a Gram Panchayat, Deobhog was upgraded to a Nagar Panchayat (a type of urban local body in India) in September 2024, as part of a state government notification aimed at improving urban infrastructure and administration in growing semi-urban regions. Deobhog lies in the southeastern corner of Chhattisgarh and is close to the neighbouring state of Odisha. The region features undulating terrain and lies within a forested and mineral-rich belt. The area is primarily agrarian but also sees some mining activity nearby.

== Demographics ==
According to the 2011 Census, the combined population of the area now forming the Nagar Panchayat was approximately 5,287. Deobhog is a diverse town with a mix of tribal and non-tribal populations. The official languages are Hindi and Chhattisgarhi, with Odia also spoken due to the town’s proximity to Odisha. The area has a moderate literacy rate and a mix of tribal and non-tribal communities.

As of 2024, Deobhog functions under the jurisdiction of a Nagar Panchayat. This urban body includes:

- Deobhog
- Jharabahal
- Sonamundi

These areas were previously governed under separate Gram Panchayats and were merged into the Nagar Panchayat following urban classification.

== Infrastructure and services ==
The formation of the Nagar Panchayat is expected to facilitate better public services including:

- Road construction and maintenance
- Solid waste management
- Drinking water supply
- Urban planning and housing
- Street lighting and sanitation

== Economy ==
The local economy is driven largely by agriculture, forestry, and government employment. The nearby region also sees small-scale trade and weekly markets. With its new status as a Nagar Panchayat, Deobhog is likely to see increased government investment in infrastructure and development projects.

== Transport ==
Deobhog is connected by road to nearby towns such as Chhura, Gariaband and Raipur. Public transport includes buses and private vehicles. The nearest major railway station and airport are located in Raipur, the state capital, which lies to the northwest.

== Geography ==
It is also a low impact earthquake zone, with occurrences of earthquakes at <5 Richter. When an earthquake occurs, it may be felt indoors by many people, outdoors by a few people during the day. At night, some people may be awakened. There is an extremely high occurrence of periods with extreme drought.

Deobhog is a mining site with ample alexandrite and garnet reserves. Alexandrite is mined at Sandmura, LaTapara and garnet is mined at Gohekala, Dhupkot and Thirliguda villages of Deobhog Tehsil.
