= Bhooteshwarnath =

Bhuteshwarnath Mahadeva Temple
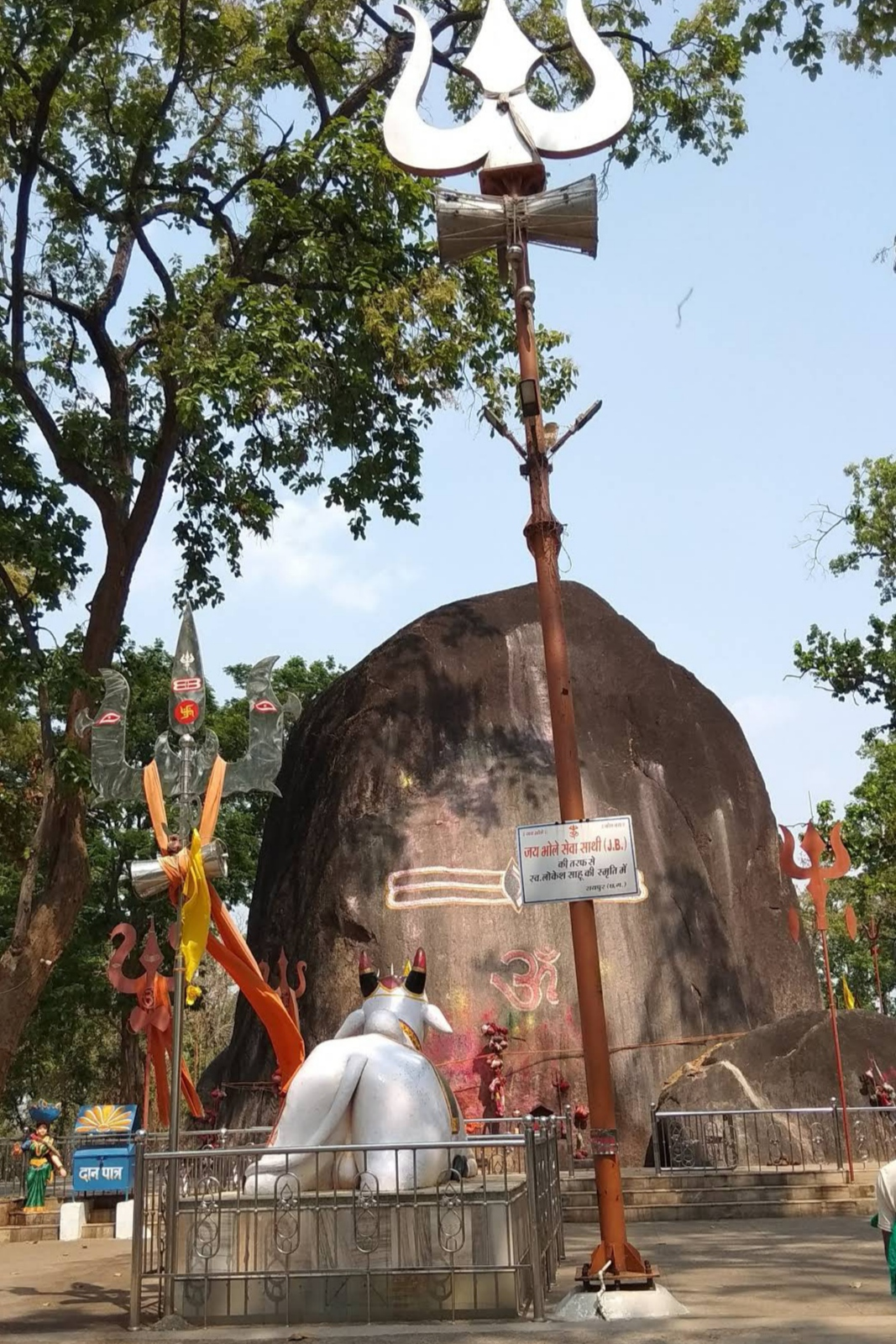

Religion
- Affiliation: Hinduism
- District: Gariaband district
- Deity: Shiva (Mahadeva)
- Festivals: Mahashivratri, Sawan

Location
- State: Chhattisgarh
- Country: India
- Interactive map of Bhuteshwarnath Mahadeva Temple
- Coordinates: 20.608359°N 82.045487°E

Bhuteshwarnath (or Bhooteshwarnath) (भूतेश्वरनाथ महादेव) also known as Bhakurra Mahadeva (भकुर्रा महादेव) is a temple of Lord Shiva, situated near Marouda Village of Gariaband district, Chhattisgarh, India. It is in the middle of the Gariaband Forests. It is the second largest natural Shivlinga (Lingam) in the world, after Siddheshwarnath in Ziro, Arunachal Pradesh.

Local belief holds that the Shivlinga is increasing in size. According to devotees who visit this place every year, the Shivlinga was once small in size, but now it is very huge. Government officials measure the size of Shivlinga every year.

Every year on Mahashivratri and on Mondays of Sawan month people with Holy Water from Mahanadi River, Rajim (Kanwar Yatra) arrive here. In Chhattisgarh, like "Dwadas Jyotirling", it is recognized as "Ardhnarishwara Shivlinga".

== Legends ==
It is said that at the time of the Zamindari system hundreds of years ago, a zamindar named Shobha Singh, of Paragaon, Gariaband, had a farm here. When Shobha Singh went to his farm in the evening, he used to hear the sound of a bull screaming and a lion roaring. He told this to the villagers; the villagers came to the farm in the evening and heard the same noises. They searched for the bull and the lion, but no such animals were found; the sounds seemed to be coming from the vicinity of this stone. Thus, people started considering this mound as a Shivlinga.
