= ISBM University =

State private university in Chhura, Gariaband, Chhattisgarh, India

- Motto: Knowledge, Wisdom, Humanity
- Type: State Private University
- Established: 2016
- Affiliations: UGC
- Chancellor: Dr. Vinay M. Agrawal
- Vice-Chancellor: Dr. Anand Mahalwar
- Visitor: Governor of Chhattisgarh
- Location: Chhura, Gariyaband, Chhattisgarh, India; 20°50′37″N 82°16′54″E
- Campus: Urban
- Website: www.isbmuniversity.edu.in
- Location within Chhattisgarh Location within India

ISBM University is a state private university located in Chhura, Gariaband, Chhattisgarh, India. ISBM University was established in 2016 by Alpha Foundation through Chhattisgarh Private Universities (Establishment and Operation) (Amendment) Act, 2016. It has won the "Best Upcoming University" award for 2017, presented by the Minister of Human Resource Development Prakash Javadekar in association with ASSOCHAM. The Chancellor of the university is Vinay Agrawal.

== Schools ==
The university comprises the following schools:

- School of Arts and Humanities
- School of Commerce
- School of Design
- School of Engineering and Technology
- School of Information and Technology
- School of Journalism and Mass Communication
- School of Law
- School of Library and Information Science
- School of Life Science
- School of Management
- School of Pharmacy
- School of Science
- School of Yoga and Naturopathy
