= Indal Deul Temple =

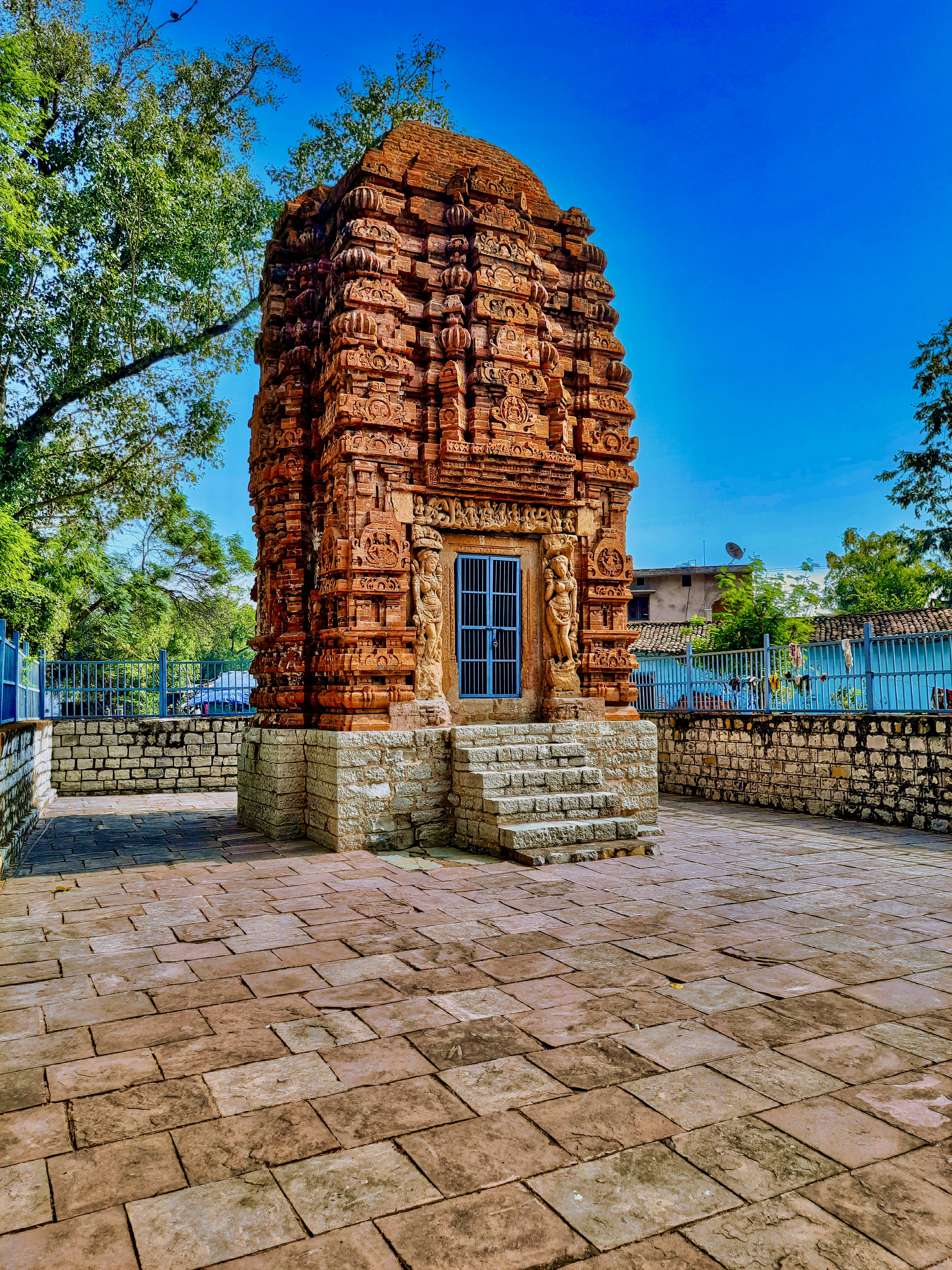

Religion
- Affiliation: Hinduism

Location
- State: Chhattisgarh
- Country: India
- Geographic coordinates: 21.746767°N 82.579628°E

Indal Deul Temple (also known as Andal Deul Temple) is a Hindu temple in Kharod, Chhattisgarh. It is dated to between 650 and 675 CE.

== History ==
The temple is a 7th-century brick and stucco structure, likely built by Maharaja Indrabala of the Panduvamshis of Dakshina Kosala. This west-facing temple is situated north of the village.

The doorway features three intricately designed bands. The third and outermost band is particularly notable, as it depicts the river goddesses Ganga and Yamuna in finely carved reliefs. These two deities are positioned on either side of the entrance, symbolizing purity and auspiciousness.

== Gallery ==
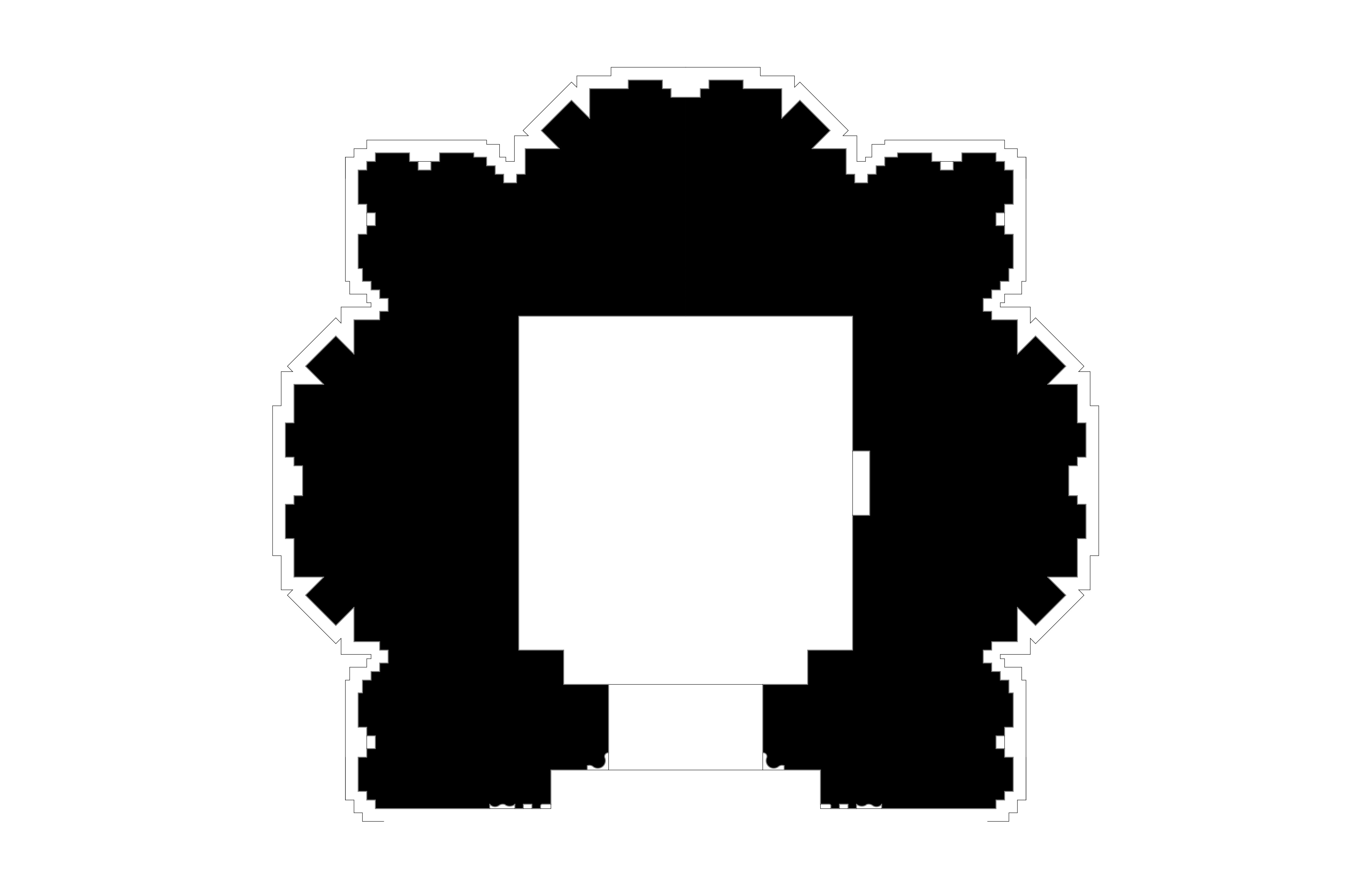
Plan

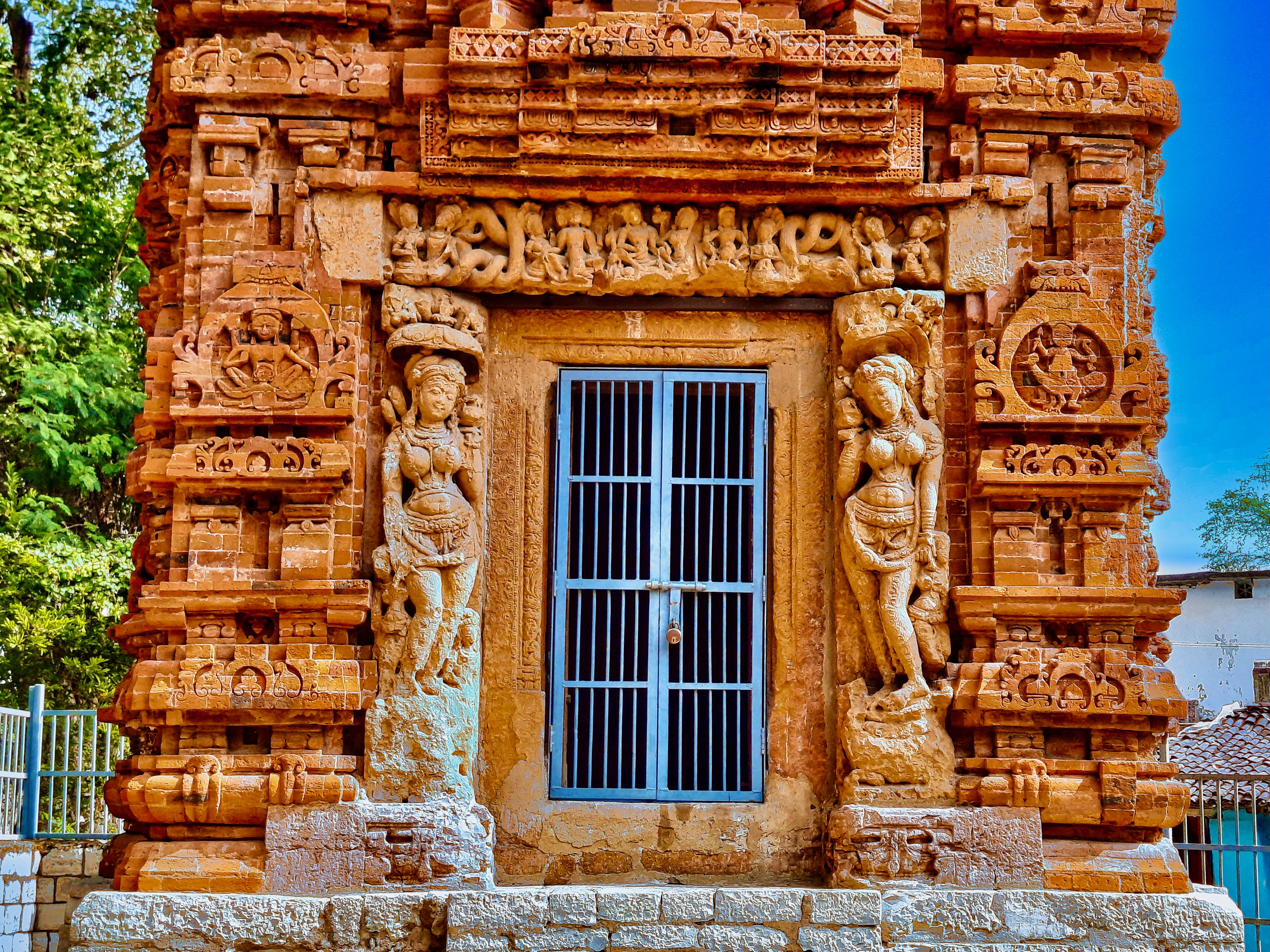
The front and doorway of the sanctum with Ganga on left, Yamuna on right
