= Mahadev Temple, Deobaloda =

Hindu temple in Durg, Chhattisgarh

Mahadev Temple
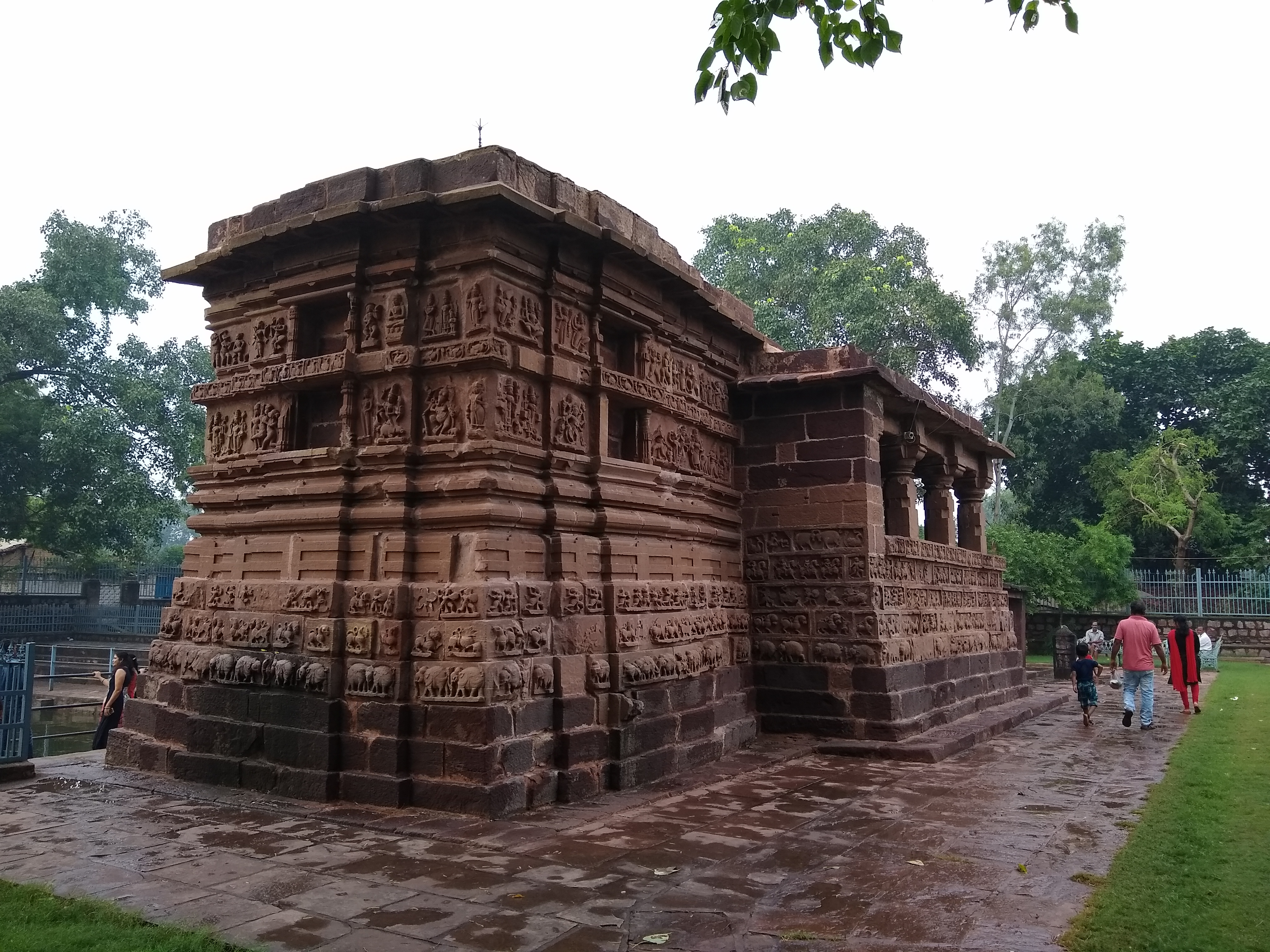
- Mahadev Temple

- Location in Chhattisgarh

Religion
- Affiliation: Hinduism
- District: Durg district
- Deity: Shiva

Location
- Location: Deobaloda, Bhilai Charoda town.
- State: Chhattisgarh
- Country: India
- Coordinates: 21°13′07″N 81°28′43″E

Architecture
- Type: Nagara
- Completed: 13th century CE

Mahadev Temple is a Hindu temple to Shiva, located in Deobaloda in the Indian state of Chhattisgarh, built in the Kalchuri era. The temple is a protected monument under the Archaeological Survey of India. The temple witnesses high footfall during Mahashivratri when the devotees from nearby villages gather here for Shiva's blessing. The event is also accompanied by a small fair.

== Overview ==
It is an ancient temple built by Kalchuris during the 13th century CE. It is said that this temple was built in just 6 months and that is why it is also called 6 Maashi ("6 months") temple. The temple has a Kund and it is believed to be connected to another old town, Arang of Chhattisgarh state, through a tunnel.

== Architecture ==
The exterior of the temple near the entrance is adorned with decorated band of Gaja, Asva and Nara. The temple wall portion has two decorated segments adorned with images of Tripurantaka Siva, Gajantaka Siva, Narasimha, Radha Krishna, Ganesh, Varaha, Lakshmi along with other depictions of Gods and Goddesses. One can find pictorial representation of hunting, hunters and bull fighting on the walls of temple.

== Legend ==
It is believed that the sculptor who was building the temple was so engrossed in his work that he didn't care about his clothes. He became naked while continuing to work day and night to complete the temple. His wife used to bring food for him, but one day his sister came. Seeing this they both got ashamed and to hide himself he jumped in the Kund (holy pond inside the temple complex) near to the temple from the rooftop. Seeing this his sister also jumped in the nearby pond. Both pond and kund exist till date. The pond is called Kasara Talab because the sister was believed to be carrying a kalasha for water. A kalash-type stone is still present there.

The locals believe there is a secret tunnel inside the Kund that leads to a temple in Arang. The sculptor who jumped, found the tunnel and reached Aaang where he became a stone. At that place Bhanadeva temple is built. The Kund has 23 steps and 2 wells beside it. In one, the flow of water never stops.

== Gallery ==
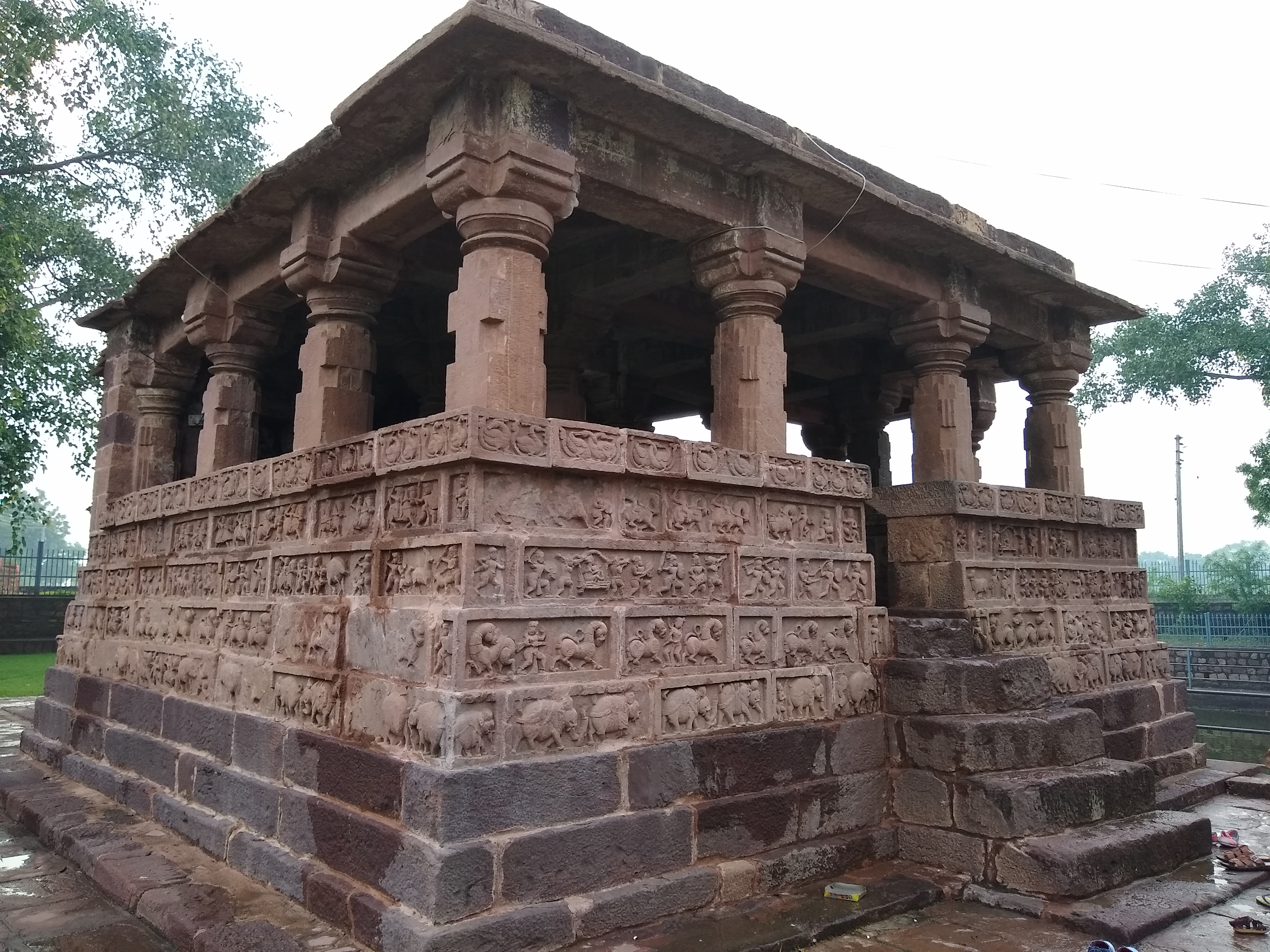
Temple wall with carvings of animals, hunters and stories

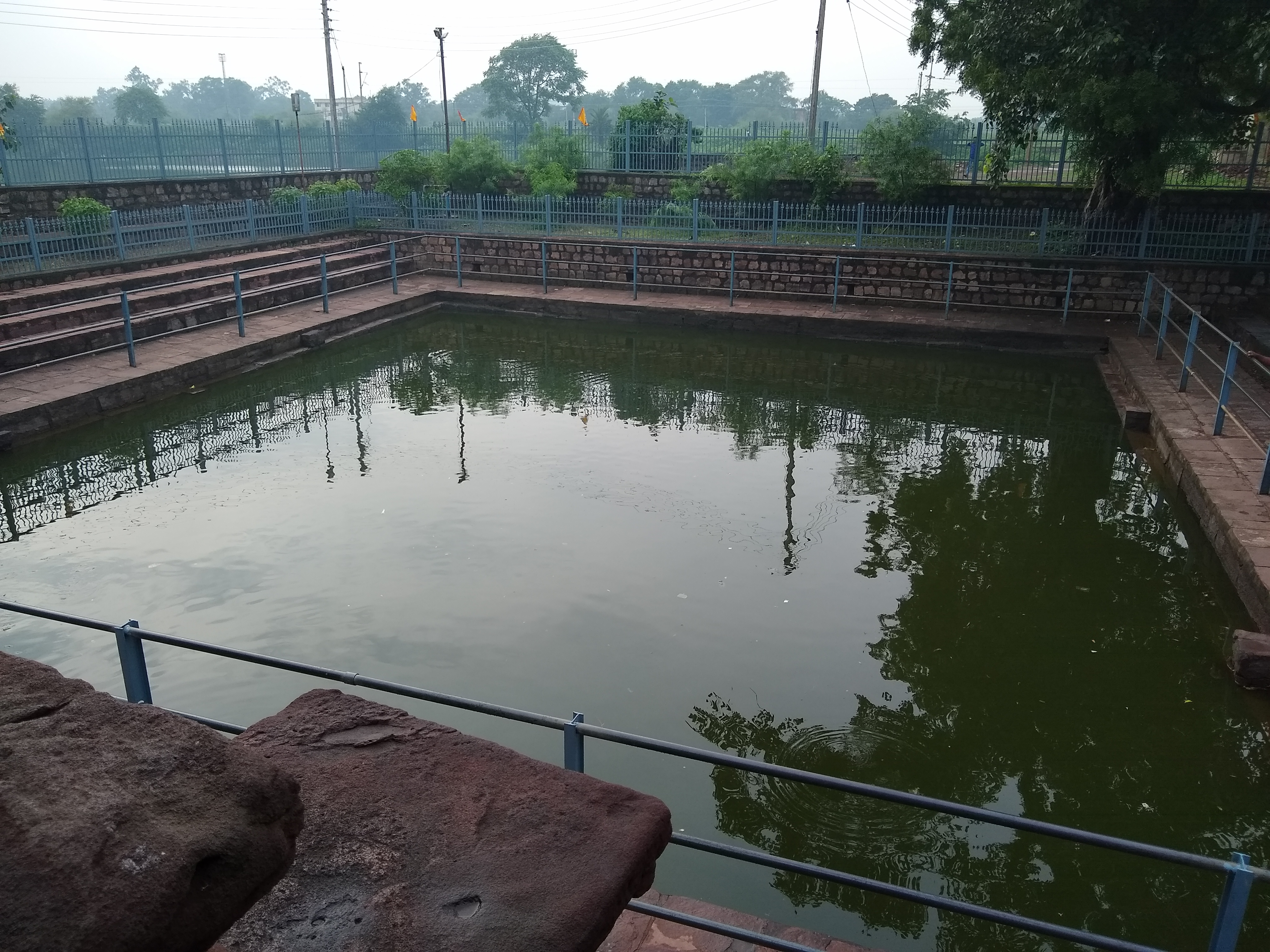
kund at the temple

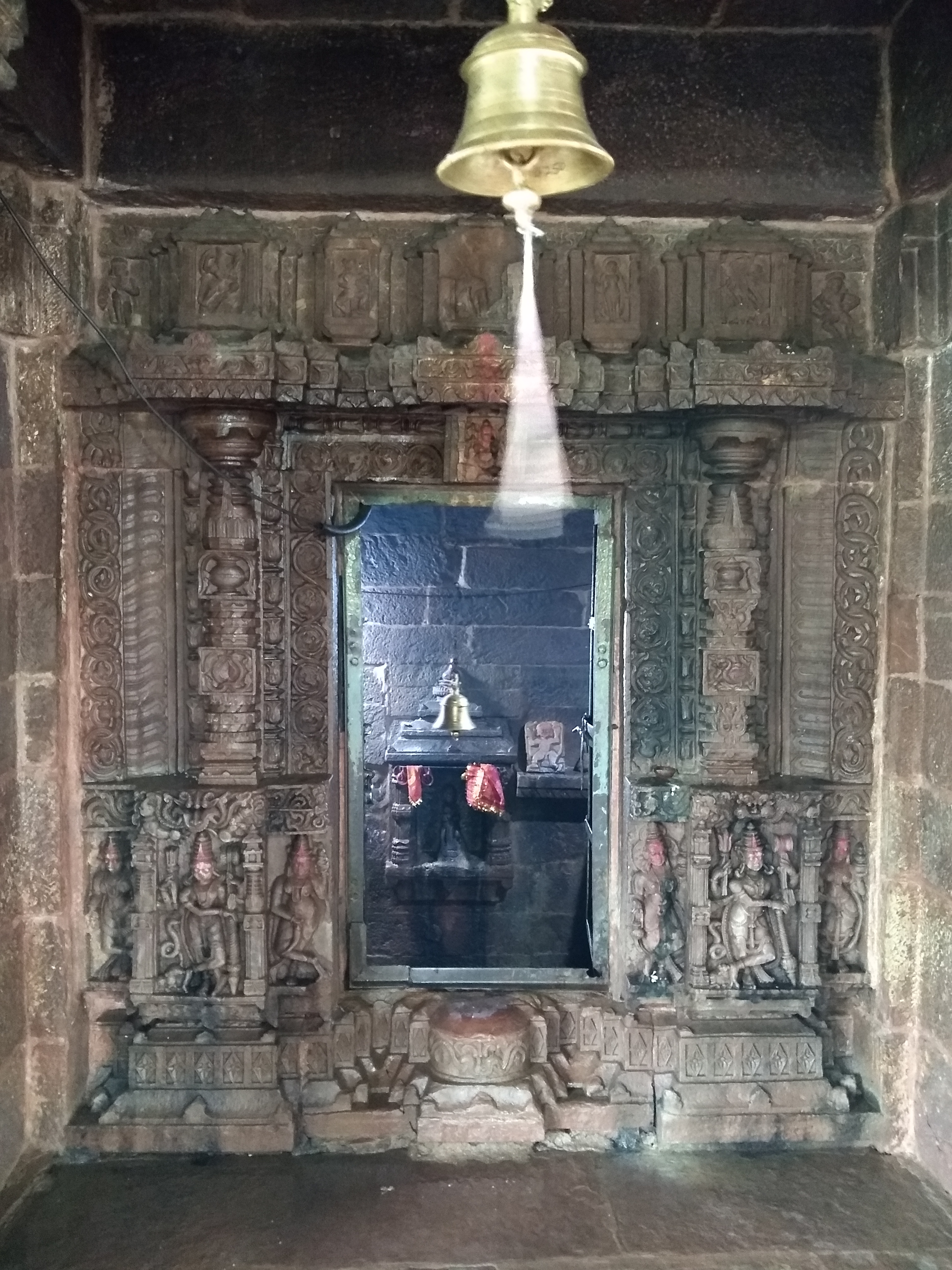
Entrance to the garbhgriha

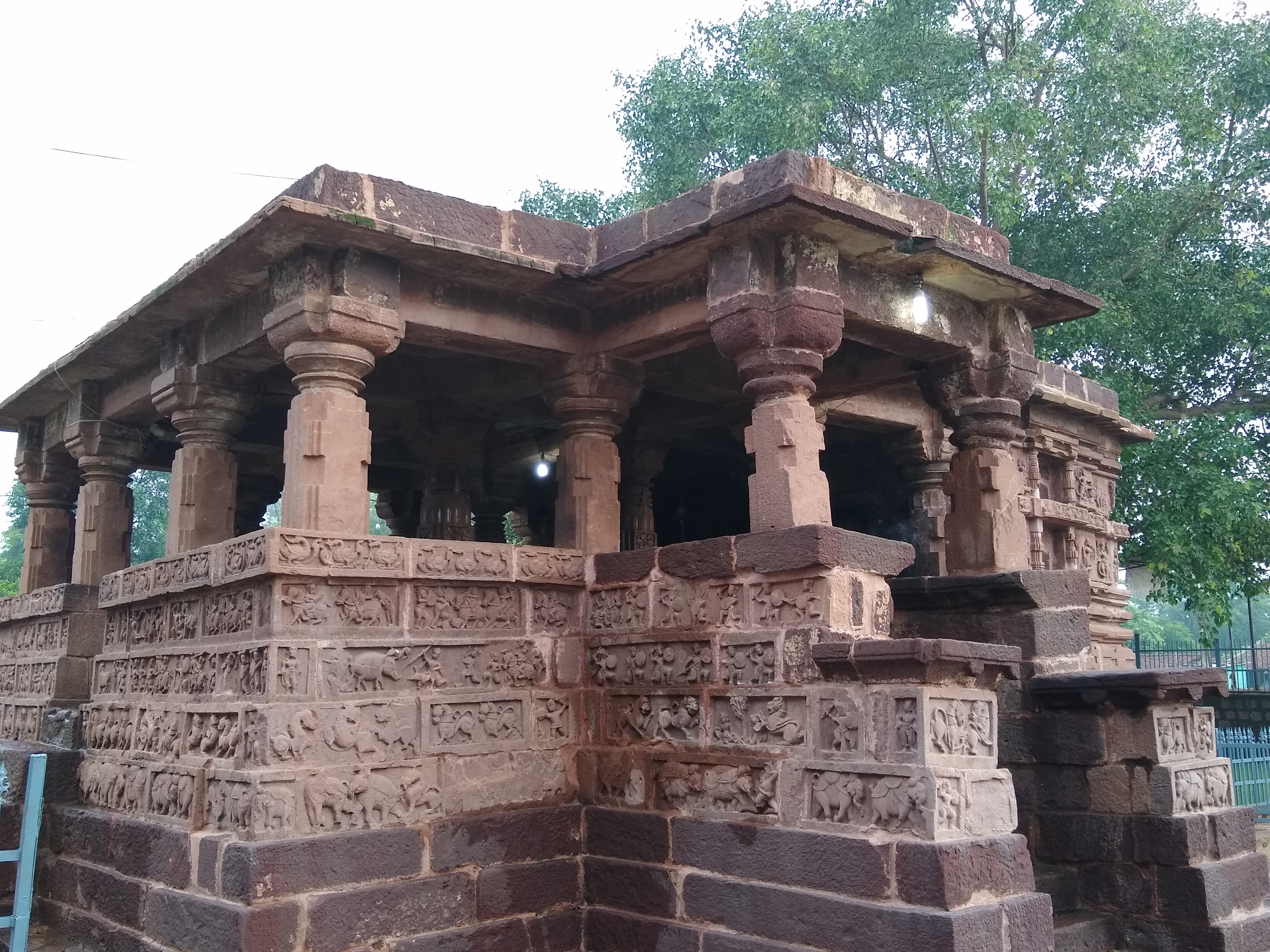
Entrance to the temple

== See also ==
- List of Hindu temples in India
- List of Shiva temples in India
