= Jatmai Mata Mandir =

Hindu temple of Goddess Durga

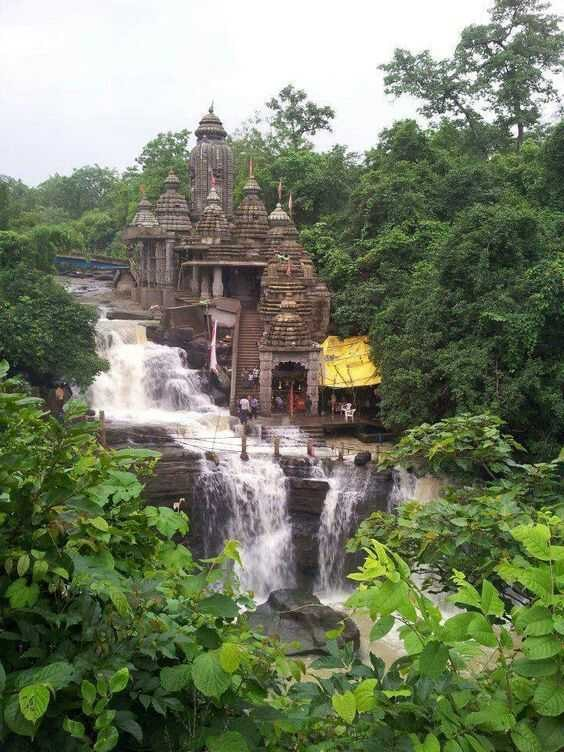

Religion
- Affiliation: Hinduism
- District: Gariaband district

Location
- Location: Gariaband
- State: Chhattisgarh
- Country: India

Architecture
- Type: Hindu temple architecture

Jatmai Mata Mandir or Jatmayi Temple is a Hindu temple of Goddess Durga ji located in Gariaband district, 80 km from state capital Raipur, Chhattisgarh, India. The water streams are adjacent to the temple where Mata touched her feet and fell down from the rocks. According to local beliefs, these water streams are the servants of the mother. Every year a fair is organized in the temple of Mata in the Navratri of Chaitra and Kunwar.

This temple of Jatmai Mata is built between the waterfalls; hence it is also one of the most popular picnic spots in Chhattisgarh.

There is also another temple named Ghatarani temple, located 25 km from the Jatamai Mata Mandir.

== Jatmai Waterfall ==
Jatmai Waterfall is a seasonal monsoon attraction located in the Gariaband district. Its popularity stems from its proximity to Raipur and Bhilai, making it a perfect one-day outing destination.

Ideal for a picnic with family and friends, the waterfall cascades beautifully in steps, creating a picturesque view. Situated just below a temple, the serene surroundings and natural beauty make Jatmai Waterfall a truly charming and refreshing escape.

== See also ==
- Danteshwari Temple
- Mata Kaushalya Temple
- Mahamaya Temple
