= Omkar Shah =

Indian politician

Omkar Shah is an Indian politician who was the member of Chhattisgarh Legislative Assembly from Bindranawagarh Assembly constituency (no 52) then Raipur district, (now Gariaband district), during 2003–2008. He resides at Village and Post - Chhura in Gariaband district.
