= Ramgarh, Chhattisgarh =

Village in Chhattisgarh, India

Coordinates: 22.928115°N 82.973014°E

Ramgarh is a village in Chhattisgarh, India; the nearest large town is Ambikapur. The Ramgarh hills are nearby. Famous Jogimara and Sitabenga Caves are situated in these hills.

== Hills ==
The Ramgarh hills are a popular tourist destination. There are many caves in Ramgarh. It is believed to be the most ancient theatre in the world.

It is also believed that lord Rama has come here and lived during his exile. This is the theatre of Kalidas (one of the biggest poets in world of Sanskrit). Here, if someone speaks in the theatre his/her sound can be heard far away. In another cave there are some paintings of ancient times. Also there is a long hole, it is believed that when lord Ram lived here, this hole was used to keep a watch on invaders. It is also believed that Ramgarh lay on the way to Lanka.

== See also ==
- Jogimara and Sitabenga Caves
- Tourism in Chhattisgarh
- Sita Marhi Natyashala
