= Kalachuri dynasty =

The Kalachuri dynasties were any of the several dynasties that ruled parts of India in the medieval era.

- Kalachuris of Mahishmati (550–625), also called Early Kalachuris
- Kalachuris of Tripuri (675–1212), also called Kalachuris of Chedi or Dahala, or Later Kalachuris
- Kalachuris of Ratnapura (1121–1225), an offshoot of the Tripuri Kalachuris
- Kalachuris of Kalyani (1156–1181), also called Kalachuris of Kalyana or Karnataka
- Kalachuris of Sarayupara (650–1080), also called Kalachuris of Gorakhpur
- Kalachuris of Raipur (14th century – 1758), offshoot of Kalachuris of Ratnapura
