= Damarudhar Pujari =

Member of the Chhattisgarh Legislative Assembly

Member of the Chhattisgarh Legislative Assembly
- Incumbent
- Assumed office January 2019
- Constituency: Bindrawagarh

Personal details
- Born: 10 May 1959 (age 66) Chhattisgarh, India
- Party: Bharatiya Janata Party
- Occupation: Farmer
- Profession: Politician

Damarudhar Pujari is an Indian farmer, social worker, and politician. He is a member of the 5th Legislative Assembly of Chhattisgarh, representing the Bindrawagarh Assembly constituency of Chhattisgarh. He is associated with the Bharatiya Janata Party.

== Early life ==
Damarudhar Pujari was born on 10 May 1959 in Chhattisgarh, India, to a Hindu family of Balram Pujari.

== Posts held ==
#	From	To	Position	Comments
01	2018	Incumbent	Member, 5th Chhattisgarh Assembly	elected first time

== See also ==
- Bharatiya Janata Party
- 5th Chhattisgarh Assembly
- Bindrawagarh Assembly constituency
