= Gariaband =

- Municipality
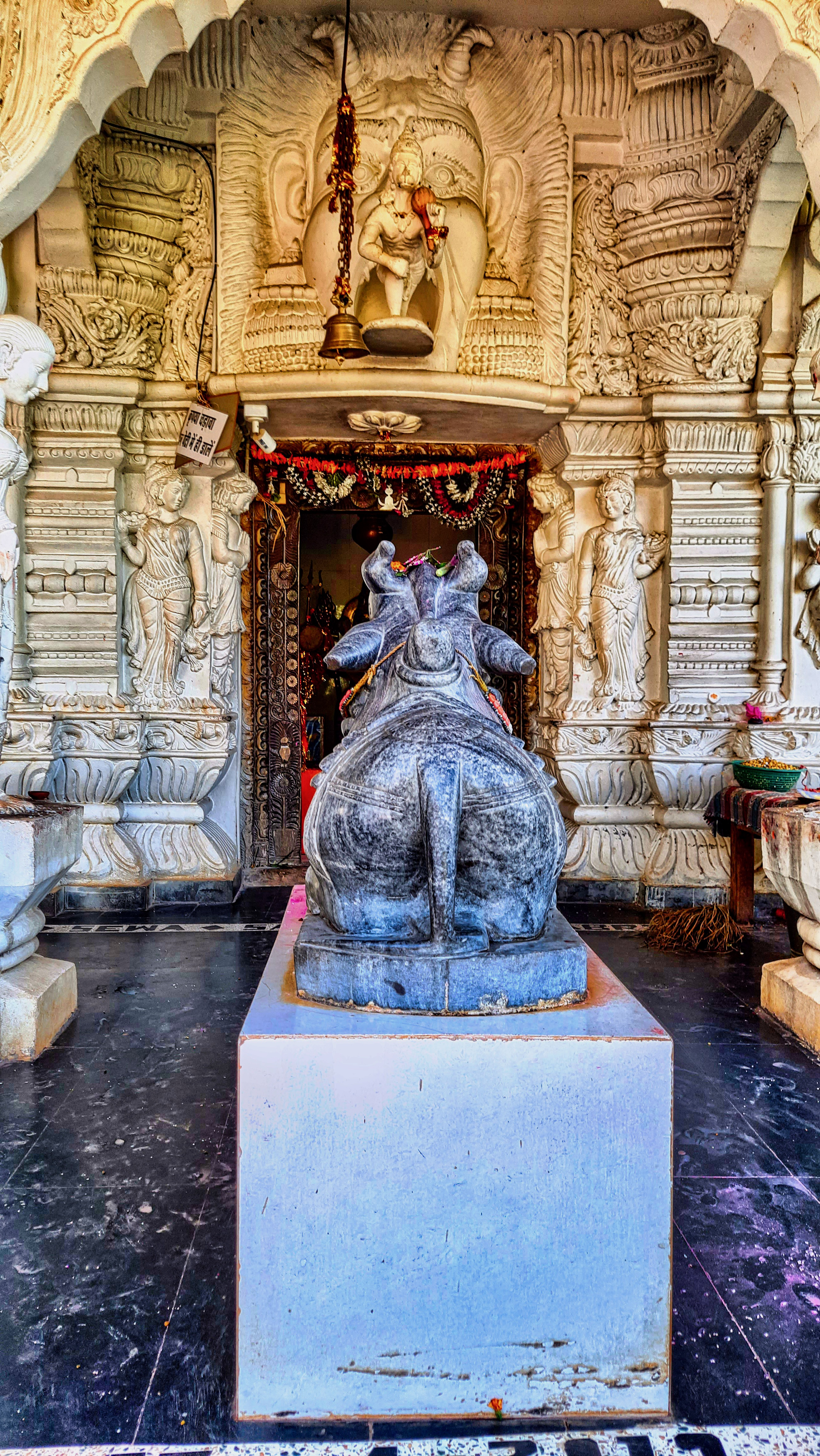
- Jatamai Temple Gariaband

- Location in Chhattisgarh, India
- Coordinates: 20.63°N 82.05°E
- Country: India
- State: Chhattisgarh
- District: Gariaband

Government
  - Body: Nagar Palika
  - Council President: Rikhi Ram Yadaw (BJP)
- Elevation: 318 m (1,043 ft)

Population (2011)
  - Total: 10,517

Languages
  - Official: Hindi, Chhattisgarhi
- Time zone: UTC+5:30 (IST)
- PIN: 493889
- Telephone code: 07706
- Vehicle registration: CG-23
- Website: gariaband.gov.in

Gariaband is a town and a Nagar Palika in Gariaband district in the state of Chhattisgarh, India. It is the district headquarter of the Gariaband district.

The nearest river that flows to this town is the Pairi River, which is 4 km away from this place. There is a major temple called Bhooteshwarnath.

== Etymology ==
Gariaband derived its name from Gīrī which translates to mountains or hills. Gariaband is a tribal area and the town is surrounded by hills. Gīrīband or Garīaband literally translates to surrounded by hills.

== Geography ==
Gariaband is Located at 20.63°N 82.05°E. Gariaband has an average elevation of 318 metres (1043 ft).

== Demographics ==
Gariyaband nagar panchayat has a population of 10,517 of which 5,233 are males while 5,284 are females as per Census India 2011.

== Tourist attractions ==
- Jatmai Mata Mandir, Jatmayi Temple is a Hindu temple of Goddess Durga. The water streams just adjacent to the temple of Mata touch her feet and fall down from the rocks.
- Bhooteshwarnath, Bhakurra Mahadeva (भकुर्रा महादेव) is a temple of Lord Shiva, It is in the middle of the Gariaband Forests. It is the second largest natural Shivlinga (Lingam) in the world .
- Ghatarani Mata Mandir, it is a Hindu temple of Goddess Durga. It is in the middle of the Gariaband forests. This place is surrounded by beautiful forests and waterfalls.

== Transportation ==
Gariaband is connected to major cities by National Highway 130C roads, and is about 80 km from Mahasamund, 90 km from Raipur the capital of Chhattisgarh.
