= Kharod =

- Town
- Location in Chhattisgarh, India Kharod (India)
- Coordinates: 21.75°N 82.57°E
- Country: India
- State: Chhattisgarh
- District: Janjgir-Champa
- Elevation: 240 m (790 ft)

Population (2001)
  - Total: 8,606

Languages
  - Official: Hindi, Chhattisgarhi
- Time zone: UTC+5:30 (IST)
- Vehicle registration: CG

Kharod is a town and a nagar panchayat in Janjgir-Champa district in the Indian state of Chhattisgarh. Kharod is historically very important place as this place is also known as Chhattisgarh ki Kashi.

According to 2011 census, total population of Kharod is 10,193.

== Geography ==
Kharod is located at 21.75°N 82.57°E. It has an average elevation of 240 metres (787 feet).

== Demographics ==
As of 2001 India census, Kharod has an average literacy rate of 60%, higher than the national average of 59.5%: male literacy is 74%, and female literacy is 46%. In Kharod, 17% of the population is under 6 years of age.

== See also ==
- Indal Deul Temple
