= Mama Bhanja Temple =

Temple in Barsur, Chhattisgarh, India

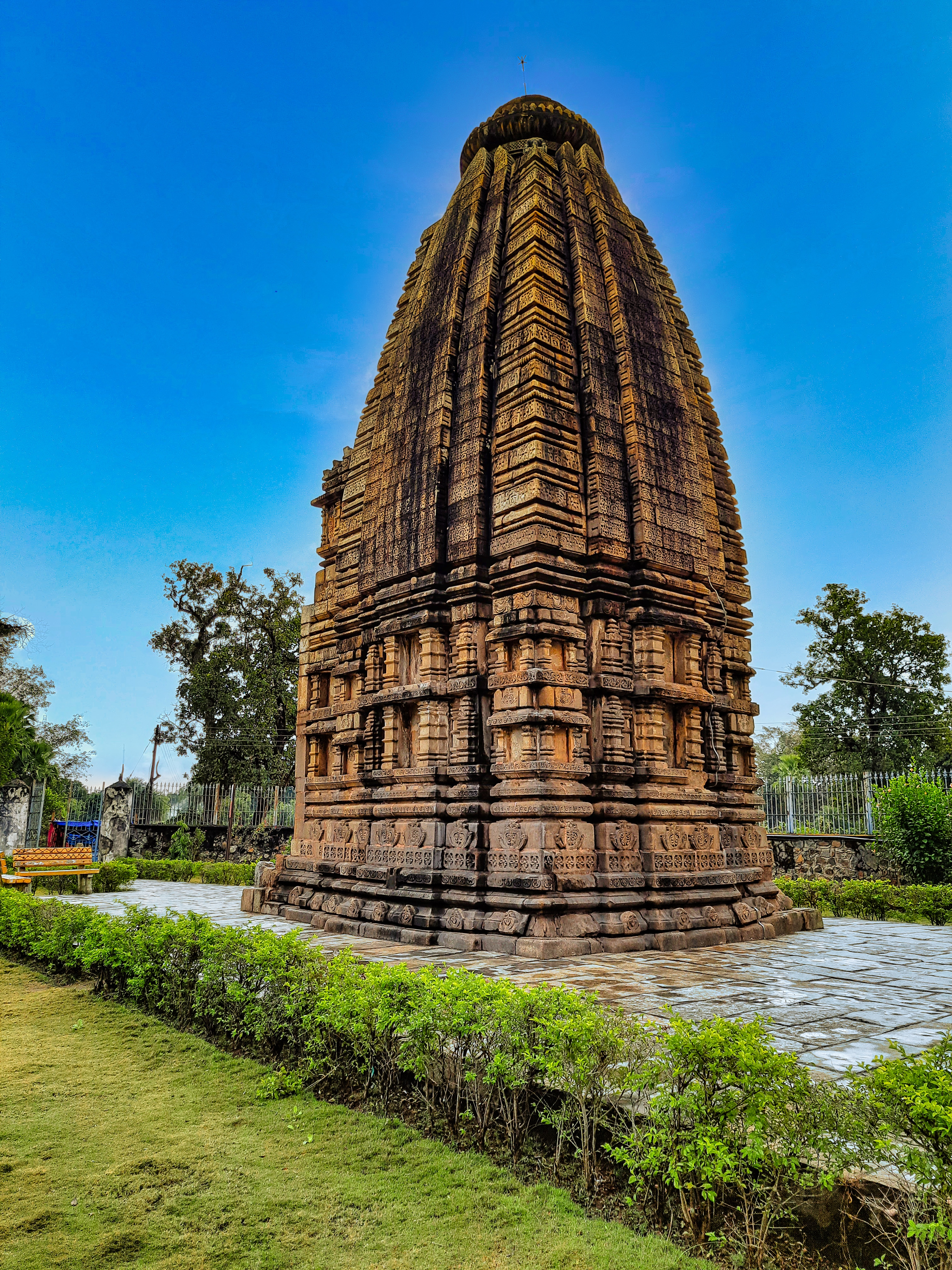

Religion
- Affiliation: Hinduism
- Interactive map of Mama Bhanja Temple

Mama Bhanja Temple is a temple in Barsur, Chhattisgarh. The temple is dedicated to God Shiva.

According to a legend, the task to create this temple was given to two people who were related (Mama is maternal uncle and Bhanja is the nephew). Surprisingly, the two men were able to complete in a day and hence the temple was given this name. The temple is now maintained by the Archaeological Survey of India.

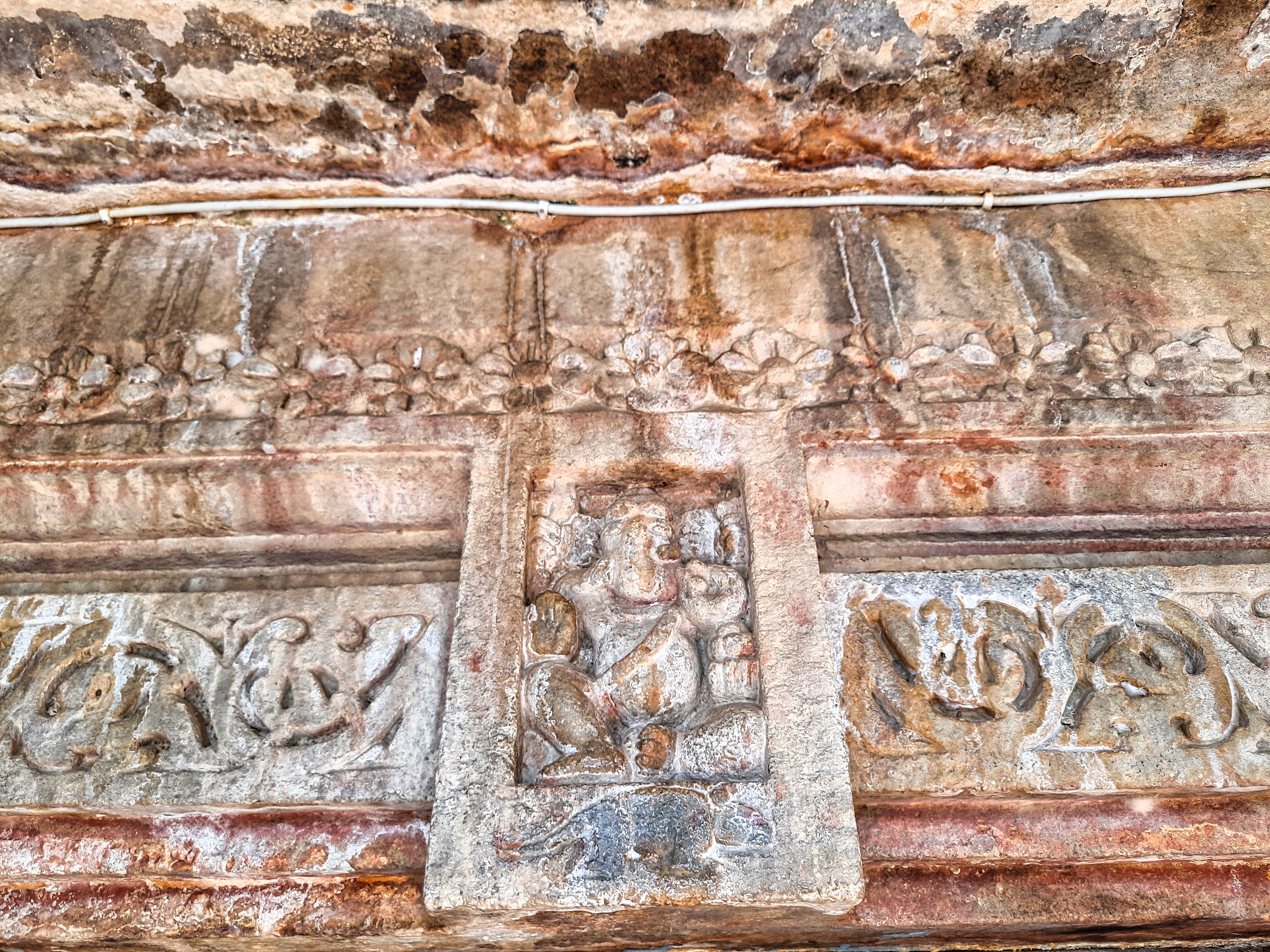
Ganesha on the lintel of the sanctum doorway
