= Jogimara and Sitabenga Caves =

Ancient caves in Chhattisgarh, India

Sitabenga and Jogimara Caves monument
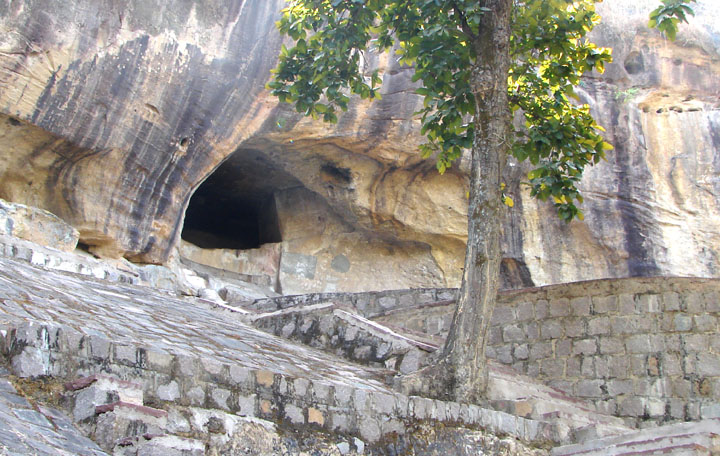
- Jogimara cave

- Location within Chhattisgarh Location within India
- Coordinates: 22°53′34.5″N 82°54′22.9″E
- Entrances: Two major caves, other minor
- Features: 8 panels of oldest known murals in India, ancient theatre-like stage and seating

The Sitabenga and Jogimara Caves, sometimes referred to either as Sitabenga Cave or Jogimara Cave, are ancient cave monuments nested in the north side of Ramgarh hills in Puta village, Chhattisgarh, India. Dated between the 3rd-century BCE to 1st-century BCE, they are notable for their non-religious inscriptions in Brahmi script and Magadhi language, and one of the oldest colored frescoes in Asia. Some scholars state that the Sitabengra cave is the oldest performance theatre on the Indian subcontinent, but others question whether it was indeed a theatre and suggest that it may have been a resting place (dharmashala) along an ancient trade route. The inscription at the Jogimara cave is equally disputed, with one translation interpreting it as a love-graffiti by a girl and a boy, while another translation interpreting it as a female dancer and a male sculptor-painter creating the two caves together to serve others. The inscription is also the oldest known mention of the word "devadasi", but this seems just a name and it is unlikely that this was related to any ancient Indian temple since the site and nearby area has no evidence of any Buddhist, Hindu or Jain temple built between the 3rd-century BCE and 8th-century CE.

The caves are partly natural and partly sculpted. The regional tradition associates it with the epic of Ramayana, one where Sita, Rama and Lakshmana came at the start of their exile. The oldest ruins and temple artwork found here relate to the Ramayana, all likely from the 8th to 12th-century based on their iconographic features.

== Location ==
The Jogimara and Sitabenga caves are in Surguja district of Chhattisgarh, about 45 kilometers southwest of Ambikapur, 180 kilometers northeast of Bilaspur city, and 5 kilometers from Khodri. It is connected by India's national highway 130, then a small spur road that climbs up into the Ramgarh hills (also called the Ramgiri hills or Devapahari), giving this site the alternate name of Ramgarh caves. Midst the two forested hills, the spur road reaches Ram Janaki temple and nearby Hindu temple ruins. Thereafter, the caves are a short hike west on a marked, stone paved trail with a seasonal waterfall and a natural lake. First comes the Sitabenga cave towards the north (also referred to as Sitabangira, (Note: Per James Beglar, this is local language equivalent of Indian word bangala (house), from which is derived the English word bungalow.) Sitabonga or Sitalangra). Next, on the south side, is the inscribed and painted Jogimara cave with platforms and railings built for visitors. The area has many small crescent caves as well, and a long large tunnel called the Hathipol (lit. a tunnel as high as an elephant).

== Description ==
The Jogimara and Sitabenga Caves are unlike all other ancient caves found in India both in design and decoration. The other sites always include religious icons and symbols. For example, the Buddhist caves include a stupa or symbols thereof, with later ones adding Buddha-related reliefs and images. Jain caves include icons or symbols associated with the Tirthankaras. Any inscriptions or paintings in a Buddhist or Jaina cave invariably includes a dedication or mention of the Buddha or Tirthankara respectively. At the Jogimara and Sitabenga Caves, there is no evidence of these. The inscriptions are poetic, the paintings largely non-religious but for one panel that seems to depict a Krishna-legend of Hinduism.

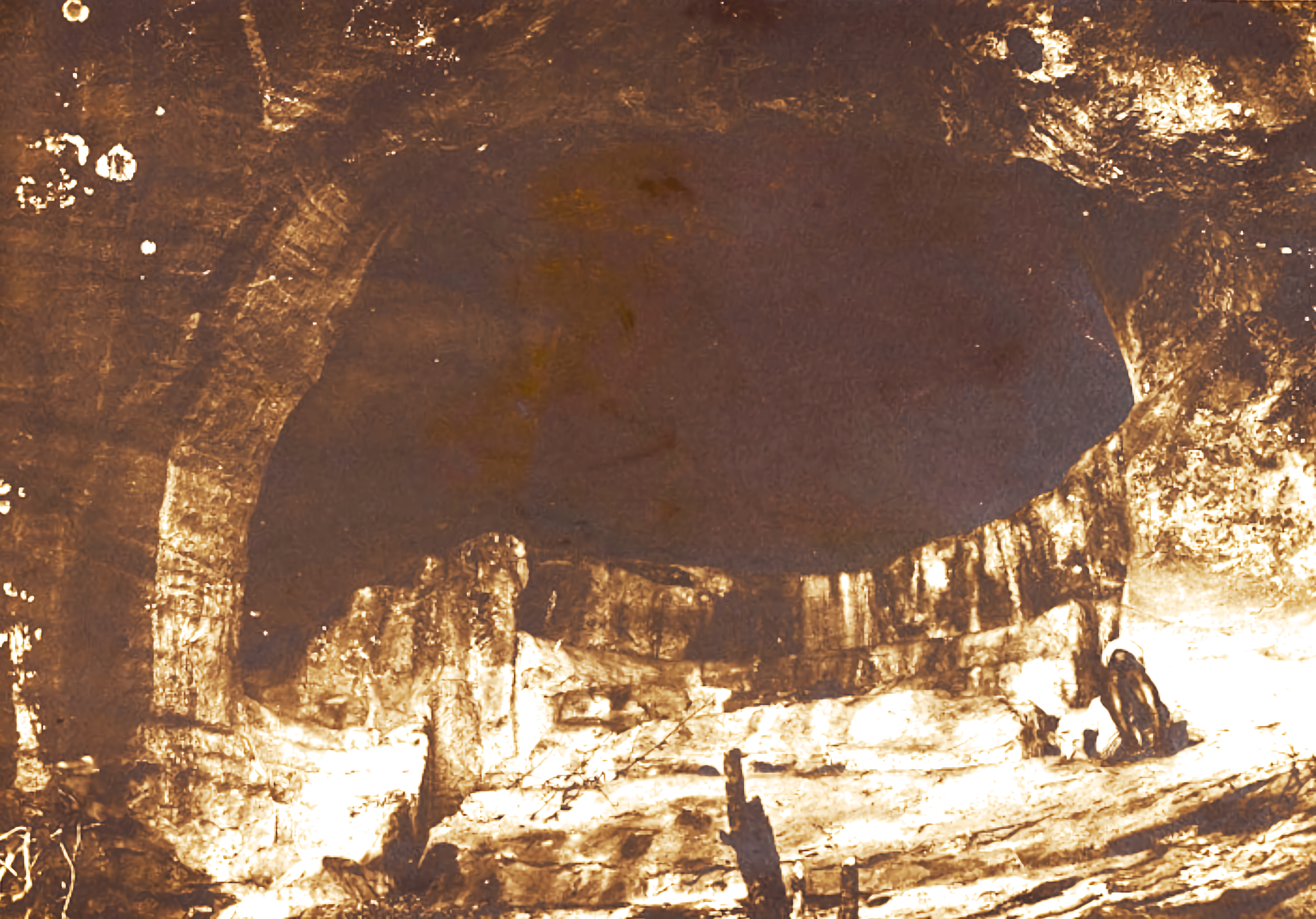
Sitabenga cave entrance, photographed in 1874

Sitabenga cave

The Sitabenga cave looks like a partly sculpted stage. It has two rows of hemispherical rock cut stone benches in front. According to Beglar who photographed this site, these may have been steps to enter the cave. However, Bloch states that the space between the benches and gradual climb into the cave make these bench-like sculpted design pointless and unlike other steps found in caves in Magadha region. Further, another set of proper steps were already provided to the left of the cave, so cutting out these long stretches with gaps seem useless. These must be benches for people to sit and watch the performance stage, states Bloch. By his count, "some 50 or more" people could easily sit on these stone benches. In order to encourage safe tourism, the local authorities have built steps, viewing platforms and other facilities near the Sitabenga cave.

The cave is oblong, about 46 by 24 feet, between 6 and 6.5 feet high. Inside, along the sides are 7 feet wide with 2.5 feet high rock cut bed slightly sloping down. Bloch proposed that these are seats and a part of the stage for the actors. Further, right around where the cave opens to the outside are two deliberately cut holes in the stone. Give their size and shape, states Bloch, these have no apparent function other than possibly holding wooden posts for a curtain or screen during a performance, or possibly to cover the cave opening to block the winter air when someone was staying inside for the night. The front of the cave has also been rock-cut and sculpted like a stage, something that would be unnecessary and unusual if this was merely a place for monks or traders to retire. (Note: Bajpai provides the Sanskrit equivalents – such as medhi, tiraskarial and others – for the different parts of the Sitabengi cave theatre; his study is based on Natyasastra and other early Indian texts on the performance arts.)

After Bloch's publication and proposal, the colonial era Indologist Heinrich Lüders followed up with the comment that the famed poet Kalidasa of about 5th-century CE was from this region of India, and passages within his poems mention sculpted performance stages. There is a gap of about 700 years between the date of Sitabenga cave and Kalidasa's compositions, noted Luders, then added that the Mathura inscriptions from around the 2nd-century BCE do mention lenasobhika, which is best translated as "cave actress".

Contemporary scholars call the Sitabengi cave as the oldest known performance stage on the Indian subcontinent, dating it between 300 BCE to 100 BCE. This classification is primarily driven by the architecture of the cave, the poetic inscriptions found in the ancient Brahmi script, as well as the murals. (Note: The Sitabenga cave is not an isolated exception of a possible ancient theatre. Other sites in India, such as one near Ranigumpha cave in Odisha have also been identified as likely an ancient theatre.) According to David Mason, a scholar of Media Studies with publications on the theatre in India, the Sitabenga cave theatre was completed in the 3rd-century BCE.

Jogimara cave

The Jogimara cave is about 15 feet by 12 feet, and has an inside height just over 6 feet. This is also a natural cave, adapted and sculpted to allow one to climb, step in, sit and rest, according to an archaeological survey by Beglar in 1874. There were no outside benches or other features sculpted at this cave.

=== Inscriptions ===
Both caves have inscriptions. According to Richard Salomon – a scholar of Indian epigraphy, Sanskrit and Buddhist studies, a paleographic analysis of these inscriptions in the pure Magadhi language suggest that they are from the 3rd-century BCE. Among ancient inscriptions found in India, states Salomon, these are "unusual for their language and content". (Note: Early analysis of these inscriptions, states Salomon, have been dated to pre-Mauryan era by some scholars and also to a bit later Sunga-period by others.) Another stylistic feature in these inscriptions is the use of danda as a punctuation mark (vertical line, as in "|" or "||"), a feature that continues to be used in many Indian languages to mark the end of a sentence or verse.

The Sitabenga cave has a two line inscription in Brahmi script close to the top of cut out wall. The Sitabenga inscription can be translated as:

Line1 Poets venerable by nature kindle the heart, who (.... lost ....)
Line2 At the swing-festival of the vernal full-moon, when frolics and music abound, people thus tie (....lost...) thick with jasmine flowers.

— – Translated by T. Bloch

The Jogimara cave has a five line inscription, (Note: Line 3 repeats Lines 1 and 2 in a larger font.) also in Brahmi script and Magadhi language (a prakrit language older than Pali, and related to Bhojpuri and Maithili languages of India). The inscription is found on the southern side after the entrance to the cave, below the painted murals on the ceiling. This inscription is partly lost and letters of some words are eroded. To translate it, the words must be completed with sensible interpolations. Two possible translations are:

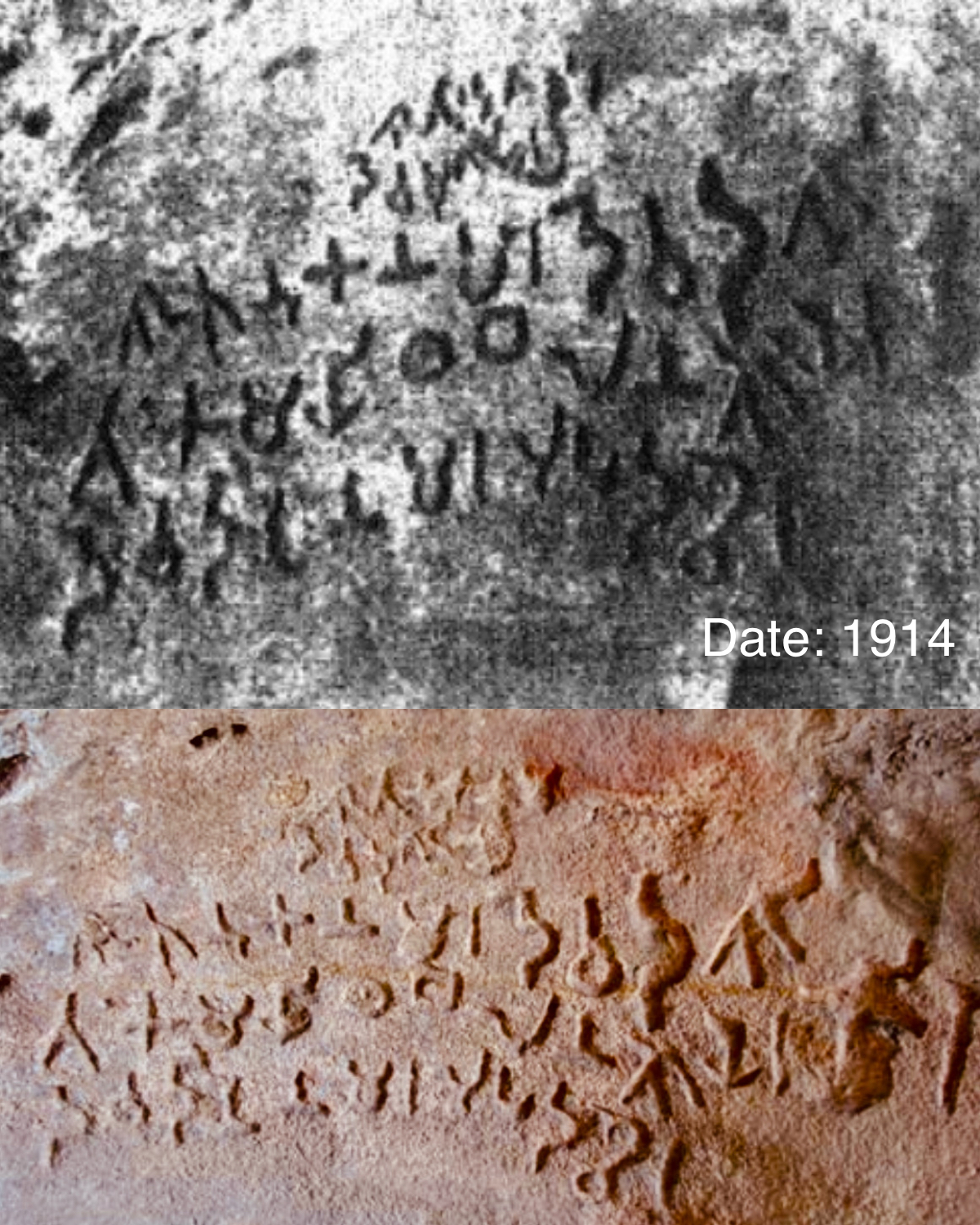
Jogimara cave inscription, Brahmi script, Chhattisgarh (300–100 BCE).

Translation 1

Line1 Sutunaka by name
Line2 a Devadasi
Line3 Sutanaka by name a Devadasi (𑀱𑀼𑀢𑀦𑀓𑀦𑀫𑀭𑀤𑁂𑀯𑀤𑀰𑀺)
Line4 An excellent among young man loved her,
Line5 Devadinna by name, skilled in sculpture (...)

— – Translated by T. Bloch

Translation 2

Line1 Sutunaka by name
Line2 a Devadasi
Line3 Sutanaka by name a Devadasi (𑀱𑀼𑀢𑀦𑀓𑀦𑀫𑀭𑀤𑁂𑀯𑀤𑀰𑀺)
Line4 made this resting place for girls
Line5 [with] Devadinna by name, skilled in painting (...)

— – Translated by T. Bloch

A third translation is similar to the first one, with the exception that it revises one word in the fourth line. Instead of "An excellent among", this leads to "A young man from Varanasi loved her". It is this third translation that has led some scholars to the theory that Ramgarh hills were an ancient resting spot for travelers, because the artist came from the ancient Hindu city of Varanasi.

=== Painting ===
There are eight panels of murals in Jogimara cave, most are badly faded. They were originally produced in three colors and cruder method than those found taught in the earliest known Indian texts on painting such as the Chitrasutras and Chitralakshana. The original paintings were repainted over by someone with an intention to restore and enhance it. This effort likely happened in the second half of the 1st millennium CE.

The original paintings lacked a base coating such as those found in Ajanta and other caves of India. At the Jogimara cave, the murals show a white base of lime. The painter sketched his (or her) ideas with an outline, which was done in red. The fresco was completed using three colors – red, yellow and black. According to Beglar, who visited these caves before Bloch and other scholars, the murals were made from five colors – yellow, two shades of red, brown, black and green.

According to Asit Halder – a famed painter who accompanied the British archaeologists to this site, the paintings here are nothing like Ajanta or other religious cave sites in India.

The mural panels are damaged. The total number of panels and what they represent, is subject to interpretation. The key features are, according to Vincent Smith:

- Panel 1: dancing girls, musicians around a sitting dancer
- Panel 2: many male figures, elephant
- Panel 3: some people sitting under a tree
- Panel 4: a couple dancing over a lily flower
- Panel 5: a doll or girl playing
- Panel 6: a boy on a tree branch, a bird on another branch, nude girls on ground around the tree (Note: This panel reminds of the Krishna legend where he steals the clothes of girls bathing in a lake, then climbs up a tree and sits on a branch; the nude girls gather around the tree demanding that he please give back those clothes.)
- Panel 7: a procession of elephants
- Panel 8: a procession of chariots, or horses and some wheels, with flowering plants

The mural is painted in a concentric pattern of panels, as if the painter wanted to create a circular view for someone looking up.

== See also ==
- Chitra (art)
