= Rajiv Lochan Temple =

Hindu temple in Rajim, India

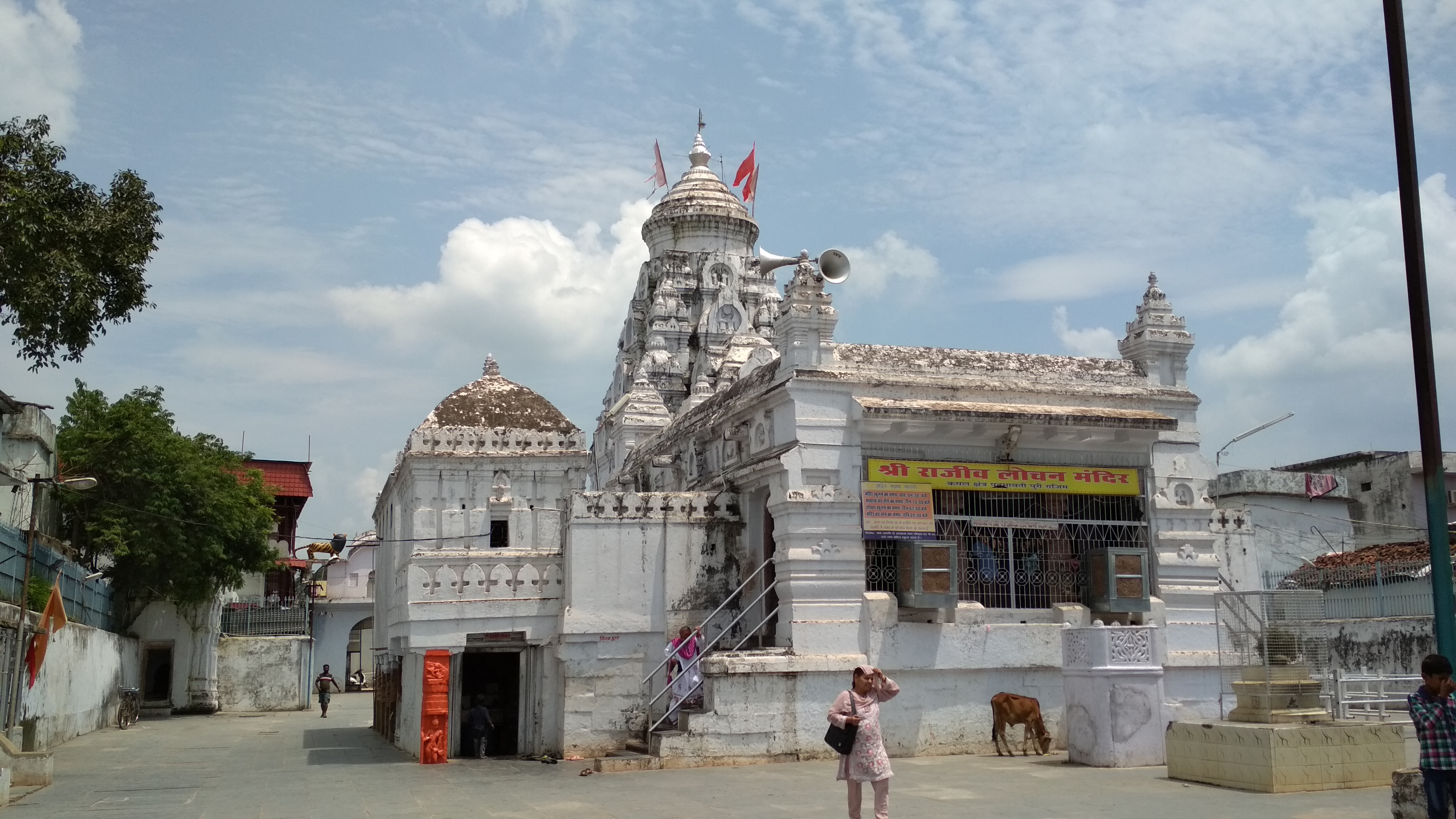

Religion
- Affiliation: Hinduism
- Deity: Vishnu

Location
- Location: Rajim
- Country: India
- Geographic coordinates: 20.9640°N 81.8775°E

Rajiv Lochan Temple is a temple located in Rajim, in the Indian state of Chhattisgarh. It is dated to the 8th century CE.

The temple is located in the middle of a courtyard, with four subsidiary shrines at four corners. The temple consists of a mandapa, an ante-chamber, and a sanctum, with the sanctum being surmounted by a shikhara. It is noted for its elaborately carved doorways, pillars, and pilasters, depicting various Hindu gods, goddesses, and other figures.

The principal deity worshipped here is a four-armed form of Vishnu. The temple is located on the route towards Jagannatha Dham, and is visited by thousands of pilgrims every year.

== History ==
There are two inscriptions within the temple. The first inscription states that it was constructed by Vilasatunga of the Nala dynasty. The inscription is undated, however, it can be dated to the 8th century CE based on paleography. The second inscription, dated 1145 CE refers to a temple built by the mythical king Jagat Pal.

The date of its construction is a matter of debate among historians. Some historians, including Alexander Cunningham date the temple to the 5th century. If that is the case, the Nala inscription probably refers to another temple, or refers to the restoration of this temple, rather than its construction. Other sources ascribe it between the 7th and 8th centuries, which is around the same time as the Nala inscription.

The temple has been renovated several times across the centuries.

== Legend ==
According to a legend, the temple was designed by the craftsman deity Vishvakarma. Another legend states that the mythical king Jagat Pal constructed the entire temple in one day. A third legend ascribes it to the mythical king Ratnakar. It states that Ratnakar was devoted to the worship of Vishnu, who materialized before him in the incarnation of Rajiva-Lochana. Ratnakar was granted a boon, and he requested that he be able to see Vishnu in this form for eternity.

== Description ==
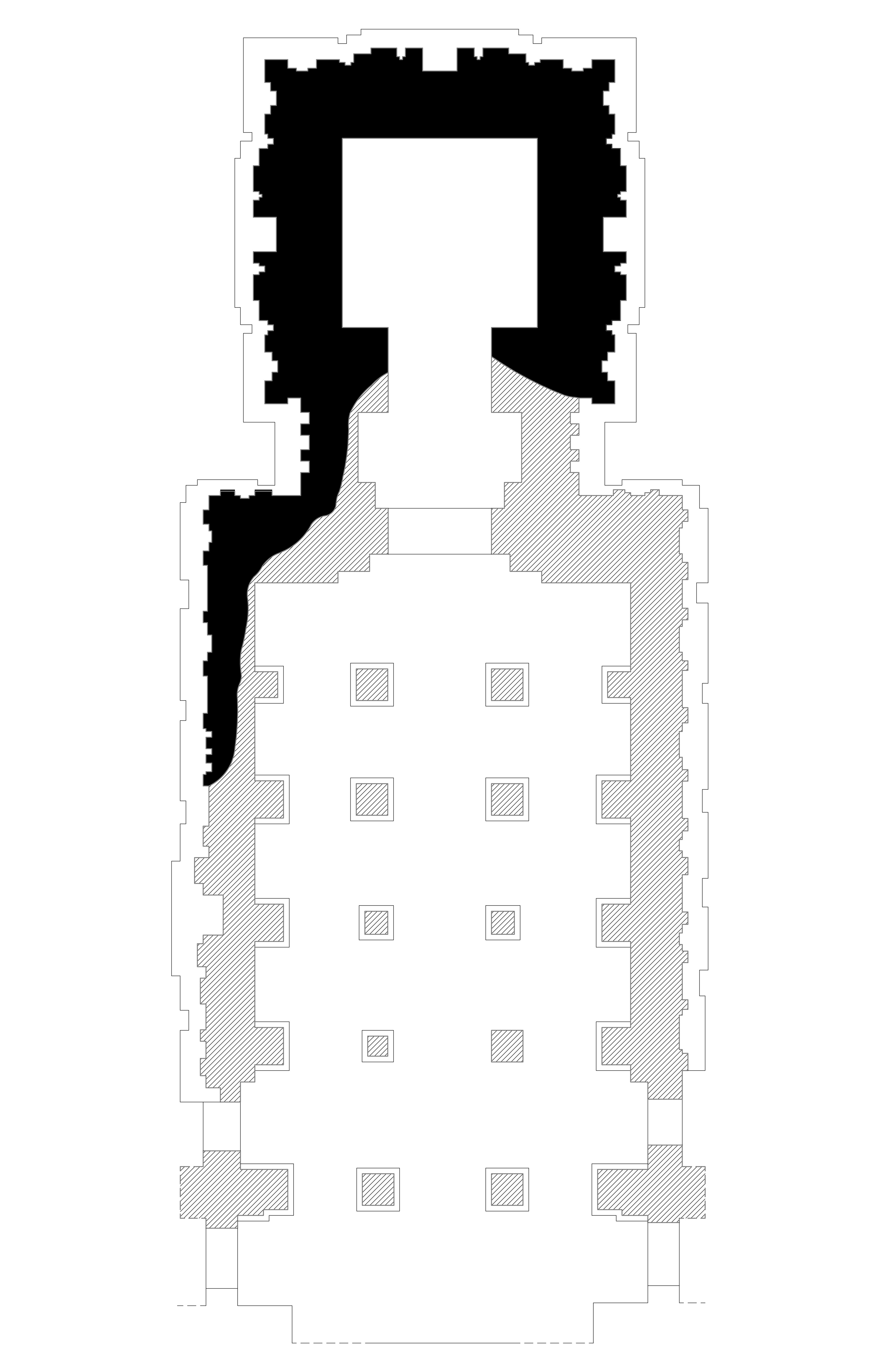
Plan of the temple (East on top)

The temple is of the pancaytana form, with four subsidiary shrines located at the corner of the compound. These shrines are dedicated to four aspects of Vishnu: Narasimha, Vamana, Varaha, and Badrinatha.

The temple is built on top of a platform, which measures about 69 by 43 feet, and about 8 feet tall. Two flights of steps are present on the north-west and south-west corners of the platform. The temple building itself measures 59 feet in length, and 25.5 feet in breadth. It is constructed out of brick.

=== Entrance ===
The principal entrance is towards the west. The entrance portico has two pilasters, with two pillars between them. The pilasters depict a tall female figure on each side. One is holding the branch of a tree with her left hand, and has her right hand raised. The other has her left hand raised, and is holding a bunch of mangoes in her right hand. The pillars are decorated with human figures, as well as a pair of knotted snakes.

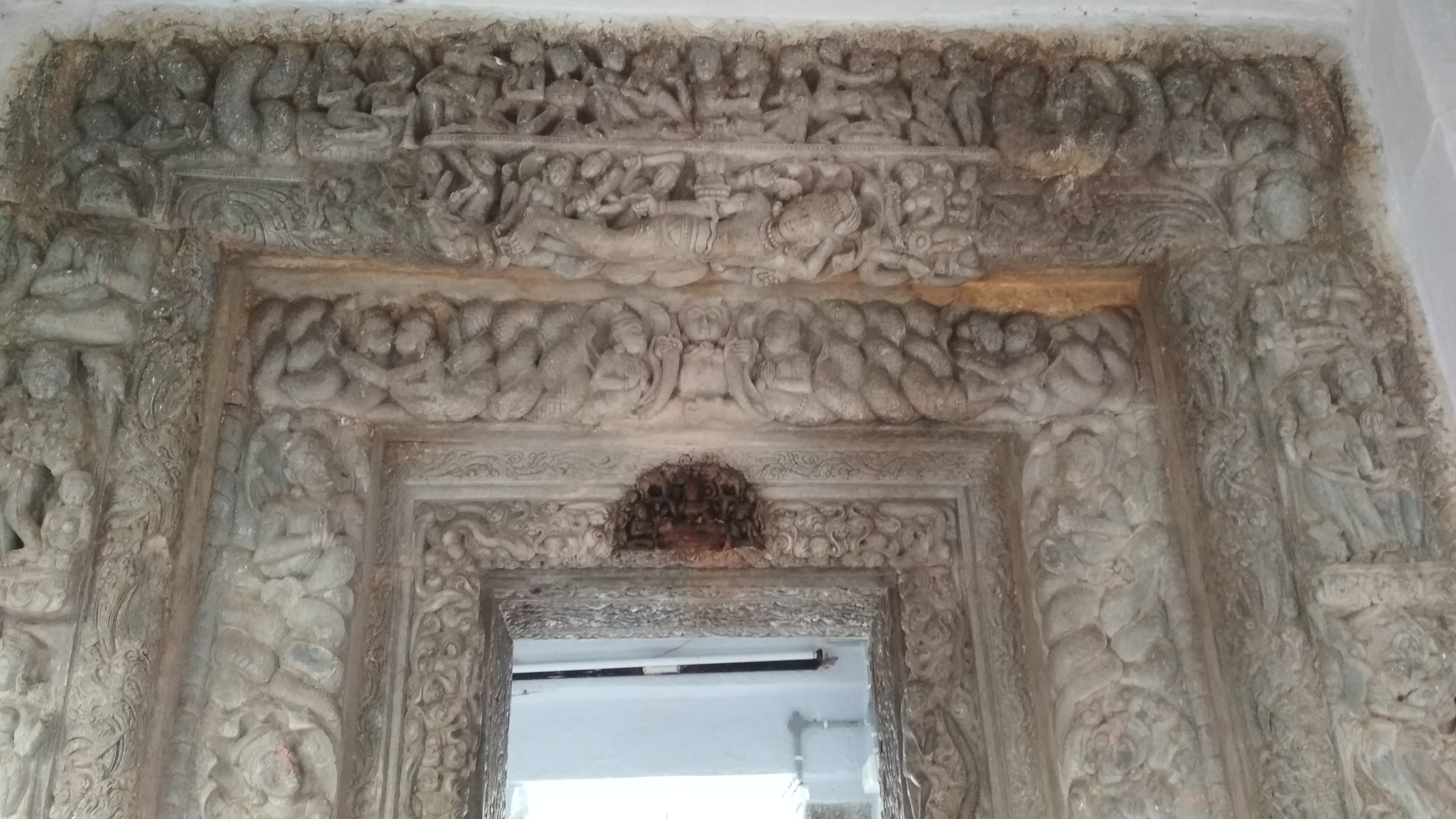
The elaborately carved entrance doorway

The entrance portico is divided into two chambers. Sculptures of Buddha and Hanuman are placed in the corners of the inner chamber. The sculpture of Buddha is of black stone, and depicts the Buddha with curly hair, sitting in contemplation under the Bodhi tree with his right hand on his knee, and left hand resting on his lap.

The doorway is elaborately carved, and is composed of bands. On the lintel of the first band over the door, Lakshmi is depicted with elephants by her side. On the lintel of the next band, Shiva is depicted along with Nagas. Vishnu is depicted on the lintel of the third band, resting on the Shesha. A multitude of figures are depicted in the final band.

=== Mandapa ===
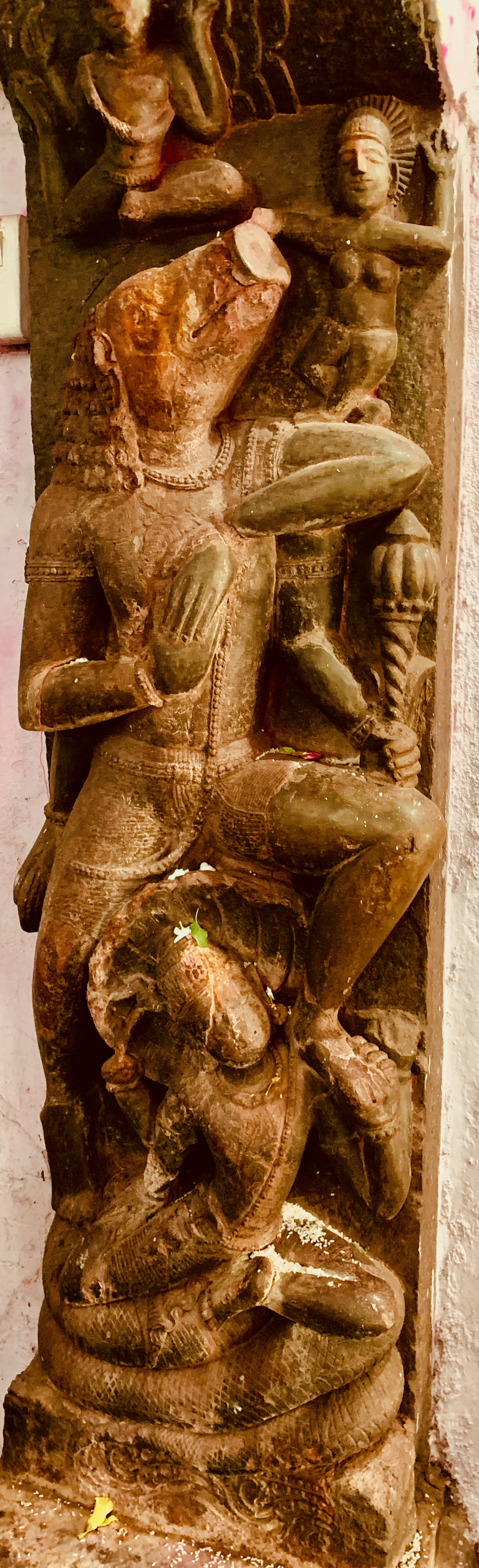
Varaha

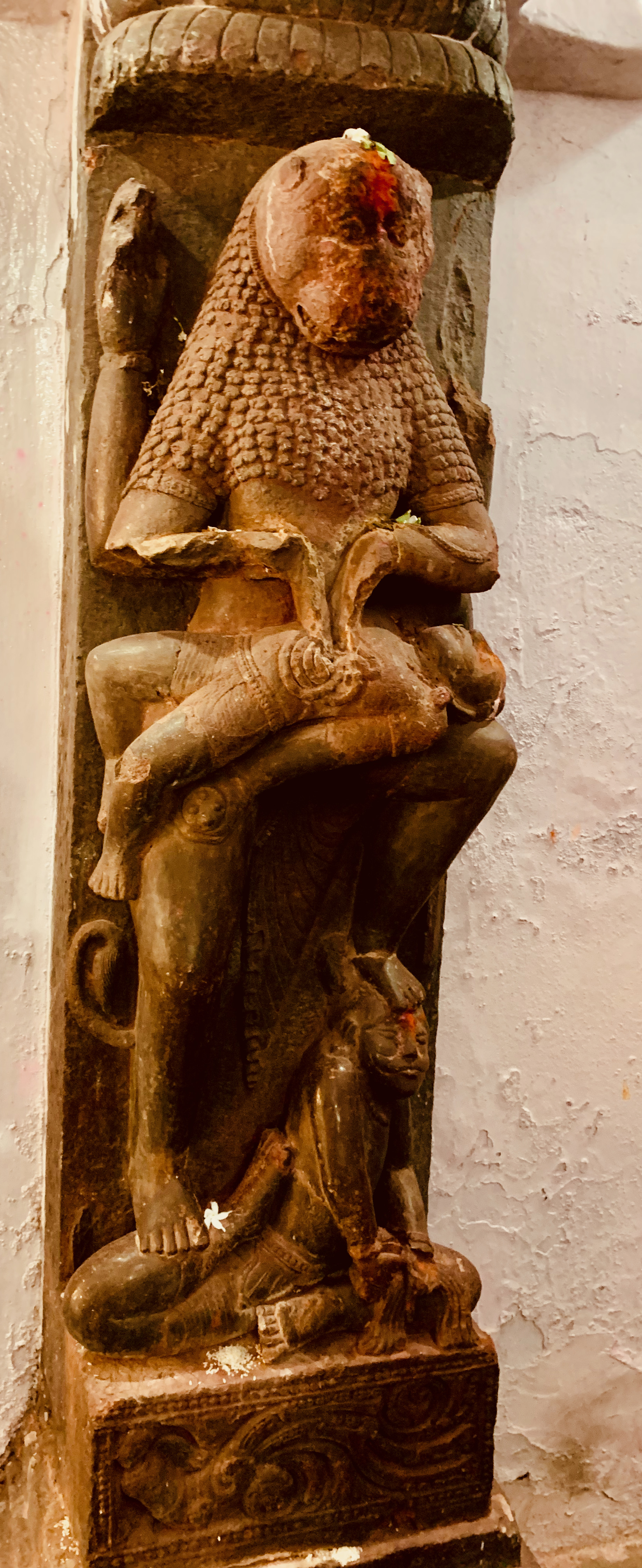
Narasimha

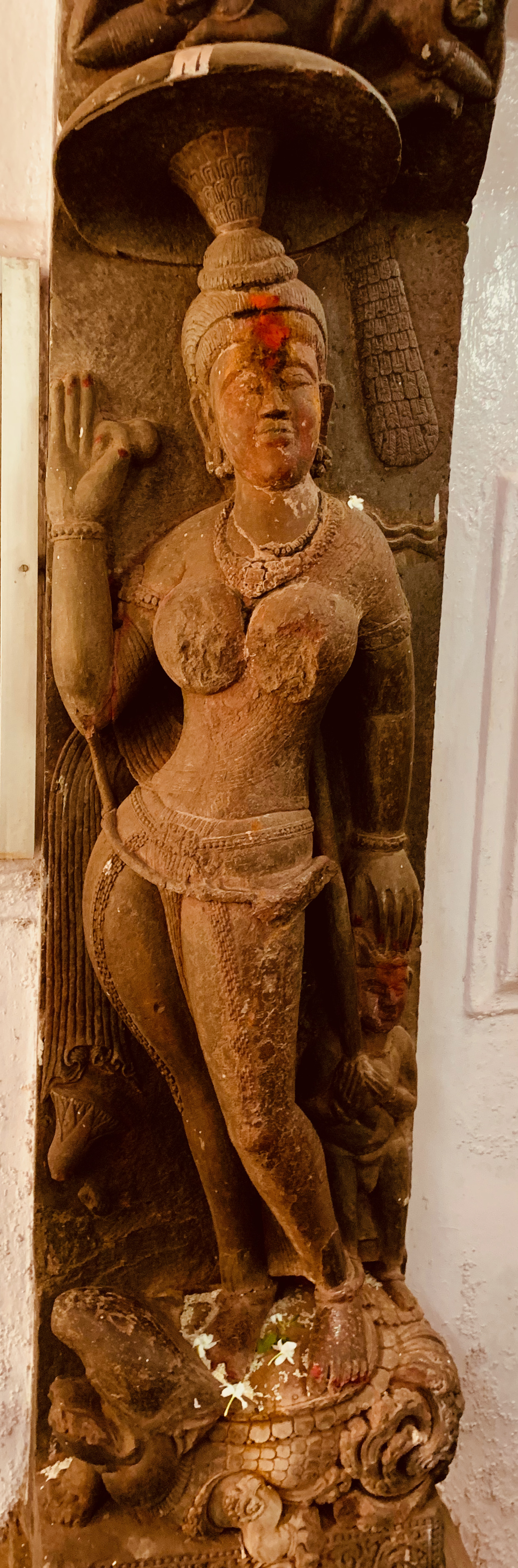
Ganga

There are twelve pilasters, six on each wall. Each depicts a single carved figure

The mandapa (pillared hall) is open towards the north. It is a flat-roofed hall, which is supported by two rows of six pillars down the middle, and a single row of six pilasters on either side. The square pillars have a plain lower half, with the upper half being highly embellished. The pilasters are ornamented with tall single figures.

The figures depicted in the pilasters of the southern wall are: (from east to west)

- A dvarapala armed with a dagger in its belt
- Narasimha
- Ganga standing over a makara, accompanied by an attendant who holds an umbrella over her head.
- An amorous couple
- A female figure identified as Sita
- A male figure armed with a dagger, and bow and arrow

The figures depicted in the pilasters of the northern wall are: (from east to west)

- A dvarapala armed with a dagger in its belt
- Varaha
- Yamuna standing over a tortoise
- Female
- Durga with eight arms, seated upon a lion
- A male figure riding a chariot with five horses. It is suggested by Cunningham that this could be Surya.

Two long rooms on the northern and southern side of the mandapa are later additions. These block the view of the main temple building, and have been described by Alexander Cunningham as "completely spoil(ing) the entire view of the temple". These rooms serve as Bhandara (treasury) and Rasoi (kitchen) of the temple.

=== Sanctum ===
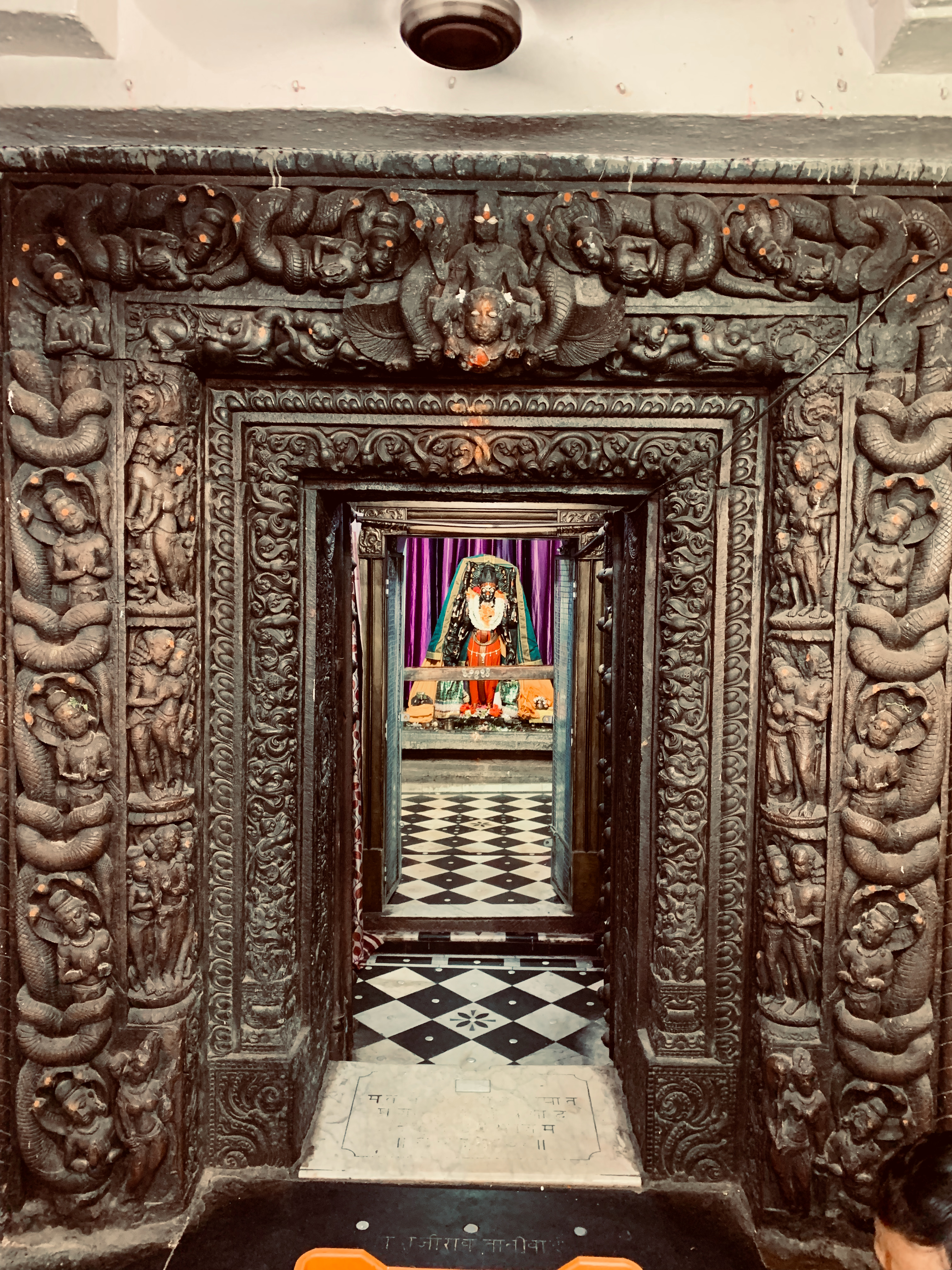
The elaborately carved entrance of the sanctum, with the principal deity visible inside.

At the eastern side of the hall is the ante-chamber, which leads into the inner sanctum. The sanctum is square in plan, with a side of about 20 feet. It is entered through an elaborately carved doorway. On its lintel is a depiction of Vishnu sitting upon Garuda. The main deity, which is a four-armed incarnation of Vishnu known as "Rajiva-Lochana" (lit. lotus-eyed) is housed here.

The sanctum is topped by a shikhara (temple tower) in the form of a square pyramid, divided into five rows of niches. Its style is similar to that of the Mahabodhi temple. The height of the temple tower is estimated to be about 50 feet above ground.

== Worship ==
The Rajiv Lochan Kumbhmela festival is held here each year on Maha Shivratri.

== Sources ==
- Cunningham, Alexander (1884). Report Of A Tour In The Central Provinces And Lower Gangetic Doab. Vol. XVII.
- Dikshit, M G (1960). Sirpur and Rajim Temples. Bhulabhai Memorial Institute. Mumbai. pp. 25-32
