= Chhura =

Nagar panchayat in Gariaband district (earlier in Raipur district) Chhattisgarh, India

Coordinates: 20°49′N 82°13′E

Chhura is a nagar panchayat located in the Gariaband district (earlier in Raipur district) of Chhattisgarh state of India.

Omkar Shah, member of Chhattisgarh Vidhan Sabha belongs to this village.
