= Rajim =

Rajim Prayag of Chhattisgarh
- town
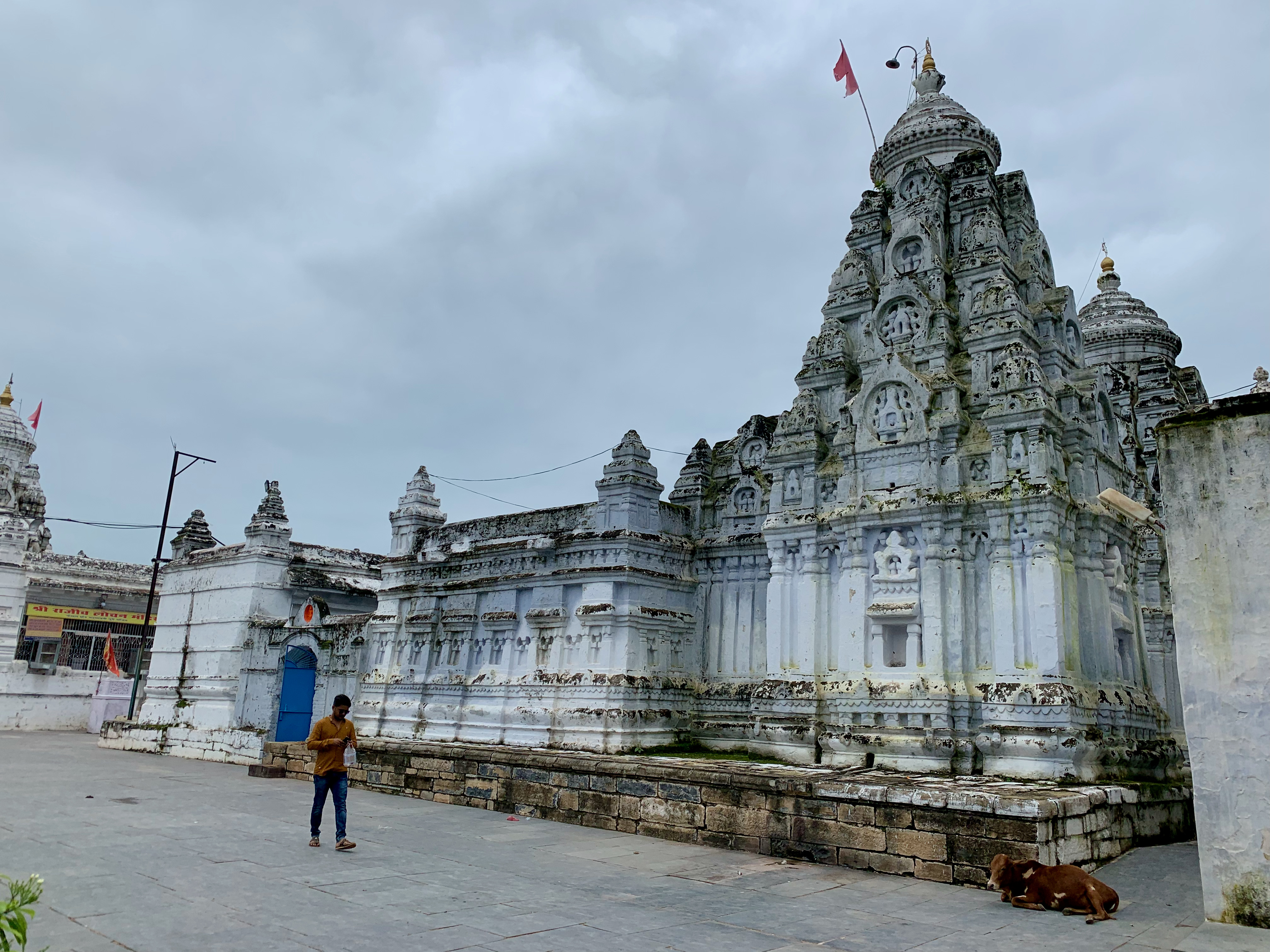
- From top to bottom: Laxman Jhula; Mahanadi River; Rajim Kumbh; Rajiv Lochan Vishnu Temple
- Nickname: Cultural capital of Chhattisgarh
- Location in Chhattisgarh, India Rajim (India)
- Coordinates: 20°57′54″N 81°52′54″E
- Country: India
- State: Chhattisgarh
- District: Raipur (proposed); Gariaband (official)
- Founder: Raja Ratnadeva
- Elevation: 281 m (922 ft)

Population (2011)
  - Total: 14,090

Languages
  - Official: Hindi, Chhattisgarhi
- Time zone: UTC+5:30 (IST)
- Vehicle registration: CG
- Nearest city: Mahasamund 25 km

Rajim is a town in Gariaband district, Chhattisgarh, India.

== Geography ==
It is located at an elevation of 281 m above MSL.

== Temples ==
=== Rajiv Lochan Vishnu temple ===
The Rajiv Lochan Vishnu temple is an ancient Vishnu temple located at Rajim. A 7th century CE inscription recording the construction of the temple, and dated to the reign of the king Vilasatunga, has been found here. Vilasatunga probably belonged to a branch of the Nala dynasty.

This temple is a notable example of the work of architect Panchayana Shaili. The temple structure is supported by twelve towered columns embroidered with stone carvings, which bear the faces of the various gods of the Hindu mythology. The temple is an important religious construct visited by devotees from all over the globe who arrive to offer their prayers to Vishnu. The statue of Buddha in the meditative position under the Bodhi tree carved out of black stone is also popular in the city.

== Notable people ==
- Maharishi Mahesh Yogi
