= Gariaband district =

- District of Chhattisgarh
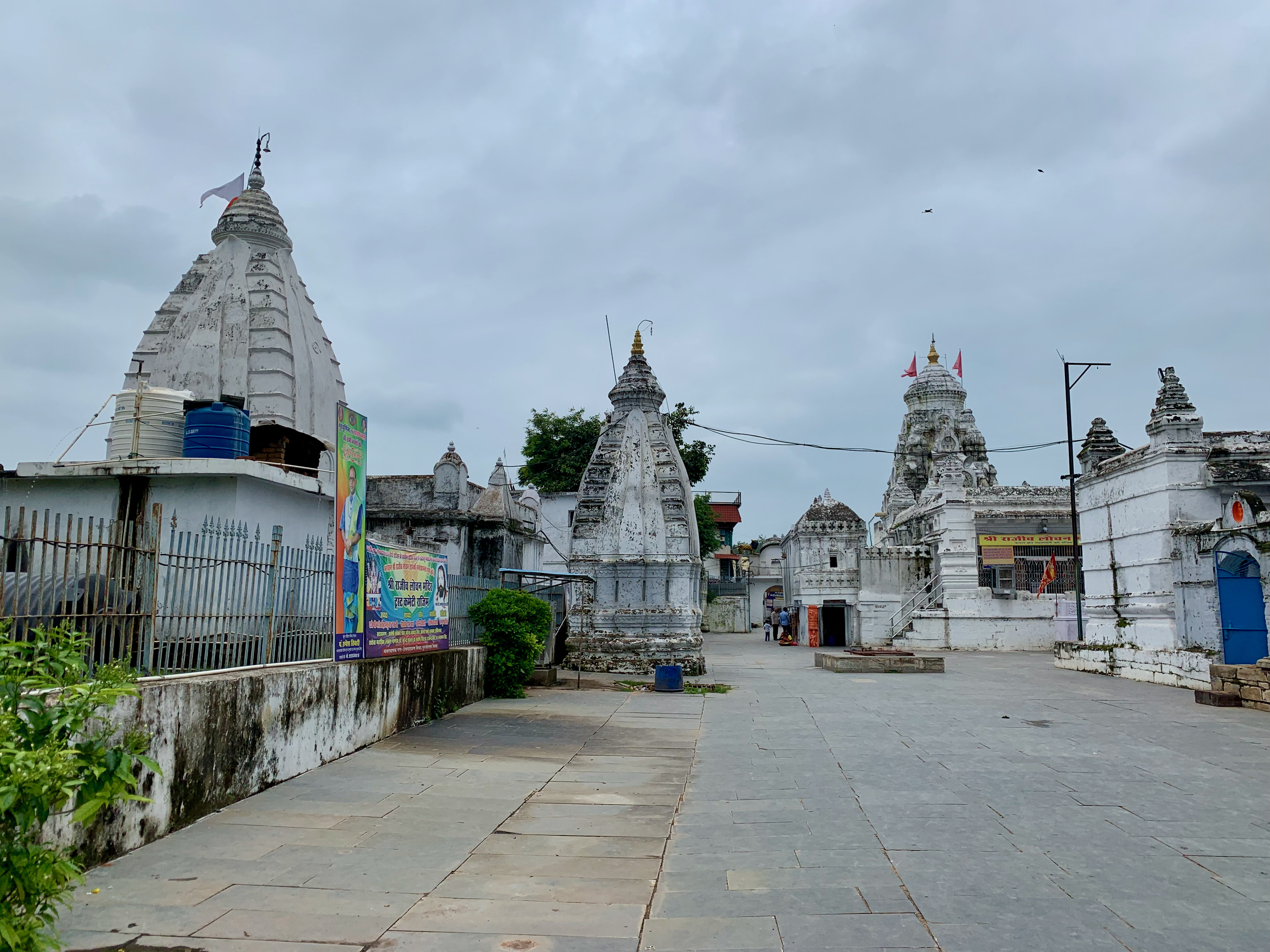
- Rajivalochan Vishnu Temple in Rajim
- Interactive map of Gariaband district
- Country: India
- State: Chhattisgarh
- Division: Raipur
- Headquarters: Gariaband
- Tehsils: List: 5

Government
  - Collector & District Magistrate: Mr. Prabhat Malik, IAS
  - Lok Sabha constituencies: Mahasamund
  - Superintendent of Police: Mr. J. R. Thakur, IPS

Area
  - Total: 5,822.861 km^{2} (2,248.219 sq mi)

Population (2011)
  - Total: 597,653
  - Density: 102.639/km^{2} (265.834/sq mi)

Demographics
  - Literacy: 68.26%
  - Sex ratio: 1020
- Time zone: UTC+05:30 (IST)
- PIN: 493xxx (Gariaband)
- Vehicle registration: CG-23
- Major highways: NH-130C
- Website: gariaband.gov.in

Gariaband district is one of the 33 districts of Chhattisgarh. It has its headquarters at Gariaband town. The district was carved out of Raipur district in 2012.

== History ==
The earliest history of the district is associated with Rajim. At the Rajiv Lochan temple, a 7th-century inscription records the king as Vilasatunga, most likely from the Nala dynasty. The region was controlled by a variety of powers, including the Mauryas and Guptas. The Kalachuris, who conquered the territory in the 10th century CE continued to rule there until Marathas invasions in 1742.

== Geography ==
The district covers an area of 5,822 square kilometres (2,248 sq mi). The district is bordered on the south by the Nabarangpur district of Odisha, on the east by the Kalahandi and Nuapada districts of Odisha, on the north by the Mahasamund and Raipur districts and on the west by the Dhamtari district.

On the north the district is bounded by the Mahanadi river, which merges with the Pairy river near Rajim. Part of the district's southern boundary with Odisha is formed by the Tel river.

The district is divided into five taluks:

- Gariaband (Bindranavagarh)
- Chhura
- Mainpur Khurd
- Deobhog
- Rajim

The district has four urban bodies: Gariaband Municipality and Rajim, Chhura and Fingeshwar Nagar panchayats.

Much of the district is covered by forest. The forest area of the district is 2,935 square kilometres (1,133 sq mi), including Udanti Sitanadi Tiger Reserve, making up over half of the district area.

The present Collector and District Magistrate of Gariaband is Chhattar Singh Dehre (IAS). Shri Bhojram Patel is the Superintendent of Police of Gariaband District.

== Demographics ==
Religions in Gariaband district (2011)
Religion	Percent
Hinduism	98.50%
Islam	0.91%
Other or not stated	0.59%
Distribution of religions

According to the 2011 census, the population of the district was 597,653, of which 40,454 (6.77%) live in urban areas. The sex ratio was 1020 and the literacy rate was 68.26%. Scheduled Castes and Scheduled Tribes made up 17.97% and 36.14% of the population respectively. Tribals made up 48% of Chhura taluk and were the majority in Gariaband and Mainpur taluks.

Languages of Gariaband district (2011)
1. Chhattisgarhi (69.5%)
2. Odia (22.9%)
3. Hindi (5.10%)
4. 'Other' Marathi (Kamar) (1.24%)
5. Other (1.23%)

According to the 2011 census 45.48% of the population speaks Chhattisgarhi, 46.95% Odia, 5.10% Hindi as their first language. 1.24% of the population spoke 'Others' under Marathi, almost all of whom were Kamar. The Odia population is concentrated in Mainpur tehsil, where over 40% of the population speaks Odia, and Deobhog tehsil, where over 80% of the population is Odia.

== Culture ==
Rajim is an important pilgrimage site, located on a Triveni Sangam: the confluence of the Pairy and Mahanadi rivers. It is sometimes known as the "Prayag of Chhattisgarh". Every year the Rajim Kumbh Mela is held from Magh Purnima to Maha Shivaratri. Rajim is particularly significant for Vaishnavites and there are a variety of temples dedicated to forms of Vishnu in the town. There are also a variety of Shiva temples in the area.

== Tourism ==
Jatmai Temple - Located in Gariaband, 85 km (53 mi) from Raipur. Jatmai Temple is dedicated to Mata Jatmai and is located in a small forest. The temple is carved out of granite with a huge tower and many small peak/ towers. On top of the main entrance, can see one murals depicting mythological characters.

Ghatarani Temple - It is another located 25 km (16 mi) from Jatmai Temple. Nearby there is a famous waterfall. The Navratri festival is celebrated in this temple.

Bhooteshwarnath - This village is nestled among thick forests 3 km (1.9 mi) away from Gariaband. Here can be found the world's largest natural Shivalinga. Every year on Mahashivratri and Monday of Sawan people (Kawariya) come here.

Sikaser Dam - Sikaser Dam is an artificial dam located 50 km (31 mi) from the district headquarters. It is accessible in all seasons. Sikaser Dam was built in 1977. The Sikaser Dam is 1,540 m (5,050 ft) long and 9.32 m (30.6 ft) high. A 2X35 MW Water Hydropower Plant is installed within the dam's structure and is used for both electricity and irrigation.

Udanti Sitanadi Tiger Reserve - The Udanti Sitanadi Tiger Reserve was established in 2009. They are also known for their pure-bred Wild Buffaloes. As of April 2021, there is one female buffalo, nine male buffaloes, and one young calf. With a low proportion of male to female buffaloes, the center is concerned about the longevity of the species. The center is hoping that their 25 h.a of land will allow for the species to repopulate successfully.
