= 1998 Madhya Pradesh Legislative Assembly election =

State assembly election in India

- 27 November 1998

All 320 assembly constituencies 161 seats needed for a majority
- Registered: 44,861,764
- Turnout: 60.22%
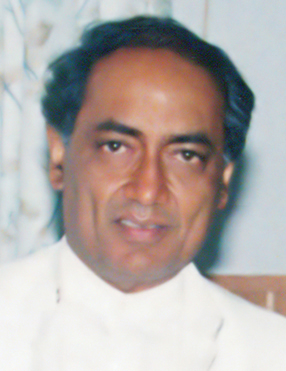
	Majority party	Minority party	Third party
		BJP	BSP
Leader	Digvijaya Singh	undeclared	Kanshi Ram
Party	INC	BJP	BSP
Leader since	1993		1984
Leader's seat	Raghogarh
Last election	174	117	11
Seats won	172	119	11
Seat change	▼2	▲2	--
Popular vote	10,778,985	10,430,233	1,633,825
Percentage	40.59%	39.28%	6.15%
Chief Minister before election
Digvijaya Singh
INC
Elected Chief Minister
Digvijaya Singh
INC

Elections to the Madhya Pradesh Legislative Assembly were held in November 1998. The Indian National Congress won a majority of seats and Digvijaya Singh was sworn in as the new Chief Minister for the second time.

These were the last elections to the legislative assembly before the passage of the Madhya Pradesh Reorganisation Act, 2000, which carved out the new state of Chhattisgarh from Madhya Pradesh. From the 320 seats in the undivided legislative assembly, the new Chhattisgarh Legislative Assembly was assigned 90 Seats, while Madhya Pradesh was left with the remaining 230 seats.

== Result ==
#	Party	Seats Contested	Seats won	Seats Changed	% Votes
1	Indian National Congress	316	172	▼2	40.59
2	Bharatiya Janata Party	320	119	▲2	39.28
3	Bahujan Samaj Party	221	11	0	6.15
4	Janata Dal	144	1	▼3	1.87
5	Samajwadi Party	228	4	▲4	1.58
6	Gondvana Gantantra Party	81	1	0	0.82
7	Ajeya Bharat Party	78	1	▲1	0.55
8	Janata Party	14	1	▲1	0.20
9	Republican Party of India	20	1	▲1	0.13
10	Independent	320	9	▲1	6.49
	Total		320		

== Elected members ==
Constituency		Winner				Runner Up				Margin
#	Name (Note: SC and ST indicate constituencies reserved for Scheduled Castes and Scheduled Tribes respectively.)	Candidate	Party	Votes	%	Candidate	Party	Votes	%	Margin
1	Sheopur	Brijraj Singh	IND	28,296	32.68	Chhotelal Semariya	INC	23,714	27.39	4,582
2	Bijeypur	Baboolal Mewra	BJP	40,472	43.43	Ramnivas Rawat	INC	34,360	36.87	6,112
3	Sabalgarh	Bundilal Rawat	BSP	30,730	28.70	Meharvan Singh Rawat	BJP	24,908	23.26	5,822
4	Joura	Soneram Kushwah	BSP	30,633	32.52	Mahesh Mishra	INC	20,456	21.72	10,177
5	Sumawali	Aidal Singh	BSP	37,085	36.96	Gajraj Singh	BJP	32,172	32.06	4,913
6	Morena	Sevaram Gupta	BJP	28,102	32.57	Kirta Ram Singh	INC	27,137	31.45	965
7	Dimni (SC)	Munshilal Khatik	BJP	28,348	41.73	Master Harisingh Sakhwar	INC	27,351	40.26	997
8	Ambah (SC)	Banshilal Jatav	BJP	25,148	33.87	Amar Singh Sakhwar	BSP	20,518	27.63	4,630
9	Gohad (SC)	Lal Singh Arya	BJP	18,869	31.28	Chaturilal Barahdiya	BSP	14,531	24.09	4,338
10	Mehgaon	Rakesh	BJP	31,360	35.26	Hari Singh	INC	27,056	30.42	4,304
11	Attair	Munna Singh	BJP	56,896	55.49	Lal Singh Kachhi	BSP	31,362	30.59	25,534
12	Bhind	Rakesh Singh	INC	40,888	37.72	Narendrasingh Kushwah	BJP	35,174	32.45	5,714
13	Ron	Rasalsingh	SP	21,501	28.20	Girdawal Singh Baghel	BSP	20,830	27.32	671
14	Lahar	Dr. Govind Singh	INC	46,656	42.39	Mathura Prasad	BJP	40,570	36.86	6,086
15	Gwalior	Narendra Singh Tomar	BJP	50,004	49.12	Ashok Kumar Sharma	IND	23,646	23.23	26,358
16	Lashkar East	Ramesh Agrawal	INC	25,633	36.74	Vivek Shejwalkar	BJP	25,316	36.28	317
17	Lashkar West	Anoop Mishra	BJP	39,129	47.85	Bhagwansingh Yadav	INC	36,583	44.73	2,546
18	Morar	Dhyanendra Singh	BJP	40,969	47.70	Ramvaran Singh Gurjar	INC	23,192	27.00	17,777
19	Gird	Lakhan Singh Yadav	BSP	30,861	36.30	Balendu Shukla	INC	21,209	24.94	9,652
20	Dabra	Narottam Mishra	BJP	26,672	28.32	Shri Lal Baghel Advocate	BSP	22,935	24.35	3,737
21	Bhander (SC)	Er. Phool Singh Baraiya	BSP	32,935	41.87	Pooransingh Palaiya	BJP	31,109	39.55	1,826
22	Seondha (SC)	Mahendra Boudh	INC	32,493	38.69	Dr. Asharam	BJP	29,010	34.55	3,483
23	Datia	Rajendra Bharti	SP	23,248	26.39	Swami Sharan Dangi	BSP	16,512	18.74	6,736
24	Karera	Ranveer Singh	BJP	31,372	30.37	Usha Yadav	SP	27,486	26.61	3,886
25	Pohri	Narendra Birthare	BJP	25,433	34.47	Baijanti Verma	INC	24,391	33.06	1,042
26	Shivpuri	Yashodhara Raje Scindia	BJP	49,205	50.47	Hari Ballabh Shukla	INC	41,905	42.98	7,300
27	Pichhore	K. P. Singh "Kakka Ju"	INC	69,291	55.45	Bhaiya Sahab	BJP	51,807	41.46	17,484
28	Kolaras (SC)	Pooran Singh Bedia	INC	35,910	44.09	Omprakash Khateek	BJP	32,933	40.43	2,977
29	Guna	Shiv Pratap Singh	INC	44,796	46.96	Kanhaiya Lal Agrawal	BJP	42,544	44.60	2,252
30	Chachaura	Shiv Narayan Meena	INC	34,840	42.48	Denvendra Singh	IND	23,770	28.98	11,070
31	Raghogarh	Digvijay Singh	INC	67,442	82.75	Chanchal Kumar Jain	BJP	13,281	16.30	54,161
32	Shadora (SC)	Gopilal Jatav	BJP	30,868	49.72	Khusal Chand Ahirwar	INC	16,821	27.09	14,047
33	Ashoknagar	Balveer Singh Kushawah	BSP	39,760	45.78	Neelam Singh Yadav	BJP	27,216	31.34	12,544
34	Mungaoli	Rao Deshraj Singh Yadav	BJP	47,806	48.44	Rajendra Singh Lodhi	INC	40,070	40.60	7,736
35	Bina	Sudhakar Bapat	BJP	36,546	50.10	Arunodaya Choubey	INC	30,718	42.11	5,828
36	Khurai (SC)	Dharmu Rai	BJP	37,091	49.48	Heeralal Chadhar	INC	32,287	43.07	4,804
37	Banda	Harnam Singh Rathor	BJP	52,604	54.65	Veerendra Singh	INC	37,738	39.20	14,866
38	Naryaoli (SC)	Surendra Choudhary	INC	34,424	46.97	Dr. Ashok Rajaram Ahirwar	BJP	29,779	40.64	4,645
39	Sagar	Smt. Sudha Jain Advocate	BJP	38,259	47.78	Premnarayan Mishra	INC	34,412	42.98	3,847
40	Surkhi	Bhupendra Singh	BJP	41,278	46.20	Govind Singh Rajpoot	INC	41,085	45.98	193
41	Rehli	Gopal Bhargava	BJP	47,155	54.28	Jeevan Patel	INC	38,950	44.83	8,205
42	Deori	Brij Bihari Pateriya	INC	39,868	48.02	Bhanu Rana	BJP	35,002	42.16	4,866
43	Niwari	Brijendra Singh Rathore	IND	65,402	47.63	Deepnarayan Singh	SP	26,024	18.95	39,378
44	Jatara	Sunil Nayak	BJP	36,174	40.11	Chhoteylal Ghosh	SP	18,343	20.34	17,831
45	Khargapur (SC)	Ahirwar Parwatlal	BJP	28,392	38.17	Ahirwar Vindravan	INC	23,264	31.27	5,128
46	Tikamgarh	Magan Lal Goil	BJP	42,079	41.15	Pramila Jain	INC	32,638	31.92	9,441
47	Malehra	Swami Prasad	BJP	35,251	36.38	Kapoor Chand Ghuwara	CPI	30,868	31.86	4,383
48	Bijawar	Manvendra Singh	INC	41,204	42.52	Jeetendra Singh	BJP	39,602	40.87	1,602
49	Chhatarpur	Umesh Shukla	BJP	50,244	47.81	Arjariya Jagdish	INC	37,428	35.62	12,816
50	Maharajpur (SC)	Ramdayal Ahirwar	BJP	39,819	46.55	Ahirwar Khilaiyan	INC	26,488	30.97	13,331
51	Chandla	Vijay Bahadur Singh	SP	40,341	41.81	Rajkishore Tiwari	BJP	29,363	30.43	10,978
52	Nohata	Ratnesh Soloman	INC	39,470	40.88	Sanjay Rai	BJP	33,229	34.41	6,241
53	Damoh	Jayant Kumar Malaiya	BJP	45,891	50.02	Ajay Bhaiya Tandan	INC	40,485	44.13	5,406
54	Patharia (SC)	Ganesh Khatik	BJP	29,366	42.54	Ramkishore Athya	INC	29,153	42.23	213
55	Hatta	Raja Patairya	INC	47,487	55.22	Dr. Vijay Singh Rajput	BJP	26,642	30.98	20,845
56	Panna	Ms. Kusum Singh	BJP	40,660	45.07	Sudhakar Dixit	INC	32,410	35.92	8,250
57	Amanganj	Gorelal	BJP	27,772	38.20	Nathulal	INC	18,116	24.92	9,656
58	Pawai	Ashok Vir Vikram Singh	SP	27,659	30.20	Pushpanedra Kumar Latoriya	BJP	26,802	29.27	857
59	Maihar	Vrindavan Badgainya	INC	21,793	23.62	Motilal Tiwari	BJP	20,623	22.35	1,170
60	Nagod	Ram Pratap Singh	IND	31,586	33.74	Ram Deo Singh	BJP	22,625	24.17	8,961
61	Raigaon (SC)	Jugul Kishore	BJP	26,343	34.28	Ramesh Choudhary	BSP	21,275	27.68	5,068
62	Chitrakoot	Prem Singh	INC	44,404	52.54	Ramdas Mishra	BJP	16,480	19.50	27,924
63	Satna	Saeed Ahmed	INC	33,408	31.60	Shankar Lal Tiwari	IND	30,983	29.31	2,425
64	Rampur Baghelan	Prabhakar Singh	BJP	27,476	30.95	Ram Lakhan Singh Patel	BSP	25,240	28.43	2,236
65	Amarpatan	Shivmohan Singh	INC	33,114	37.03	Ramhit	BJP	27,678	30.95	5,436
66	Rewa	Pushpraj Singh	IND	38,194	36.57	Rajendra Shukla	BJP	36,800	35.23	1,394
67	Gurh	Adv. Vidyawati Patel	BSP	23,750	27.55	Dr. Om Prakash Mishra	INC	18,247	21.16	5,503
68	Mangawan	Sriniwas Tiwari	INC	38,075	39.29	Girish Gautam	CPI	37,781	38.99	294
69	Sirmaur	Rajmani Patel	INC	39,351	41.17	Ram Lakhan Sharma	CPI(M)	21,454	22.44	17,897
70	Teonthar	Ramakant Tiwari	BJP	33,599	32.51	Ramgarib Banvasi	BSP	26,590	25.72	7,009
71	Deotalab (SC)	Panchhu Lal Prajapati	BJP	16,747	25.94	Bindra Prasad	AD	14,011	21.71	2,736
72	Mauganj	Dr. I. M. P. Verma	BSP	24,485	29.04	Rakesh Ratan Singh	INC	21,850	25.92	2,635
73	Churahat	Ajay Singh "Rahul"	INC	51,677	56.48	Govind Prasad Mishra	BJP	33,334	36.43	18,343
74	Sidhi	Indrajit Kumar	INC	37,447	43.56	Brajendra Nath Singh	JD	16,524	19.22	20,923
75	Gopadbanas	Kedarnath Shukla	BJP	31,561	36.60	Krishna Kumar Singh	BKUS	25,056	29.05	6,505
76	Dhauhani (ST)	Panjab Singh	INC	21,247	28.95	Chhatra Pati Singh	BJP	20,302	27.66	945
77	Deosar (ST)	Manik Singh	INC	38,956	49.90	Shrimati Rajani	BJP	15,895	20.36	23,061
78	Singrauli (SC)	Ramcharitra	BJP	37,902	38.44	Bansh Mani Prasad Verma	INC	18,846	19.11	19,056
79	Beohari	Lavkesh Singh	BJP	24,317	28.51	Shatruughan Patel	BSP	23,383	27.42	934
80	Umaria	Narendra Pratap Singh	INC	34,430	41.66	Mithlesh Prasad Mishra	BJP	26,894	32.54	7,536
81	Nowrozabad (ST)	Ms. Shakuntala Pradhan	INC	21,146	37.82	Ku. Meena Singh	BJP	17,428	31.17	3,718
82	Jaisinghnagar (ST)	Ramprasad Singh	INC	13,959	22.18	Jairam Singh Marko	BJP	13,386	21.27	573
83	Kotma (ST)	Jaisingh Maravi	BJP	34,901	44.94	Bhagwandeen	INC	25,638	33.01	9,263
84	Anuppur (ST)	Bisahulal Singh	INC	40,534	47.42	Ramlal	BJP	35,817	41.90	4,717
85	Sohagpur	Krishnapal Singh	INC	36,908	36.74	Lallusingh	BJP	34,706	34.54	2,202
86	Pushprajgarh (ST)	Shivprasad Singh	INC	14,099	26.58	Babulal Singh Marko	BJP	12,460	23.49	1,639
87	Manendragarh (ST)	Gulab	INC	29,974	38.89	Chandra Pratap Singh	BJP	29,882	38.77	92
88	Baikunthpur	Ramchandra	INC	52,142	55.78	Dwarka Prasad	BJP	17,176	18.37	34,966
89	Premnagar (ST)	Tuleswar Singh	INC	29,481	44.19	Niranjan Singh	BJP	23,500	35.23	5,981
90	Surajpur (ST)	Bhanu Pratap	INC	33,974	47.19	Sheo Pratap Singh	BJP	33,855	47.03	119
91	Pal (ST)	Ram Vichar Netam	BJP	32,291	39.37	Bhagawat Singh	INC	21,403	26.10	10,888
92	Samri (ST)	Sohanlal	BJP	22,467	35.59	Mahanti Bhagat	INC	18,650	29.54	3,817
93	Lundra (ST)	Ramdeo	INC	37,721	50.75	Vijay Nath Singh	BJP	22,751	30.61	14,970
94	Pilkha (ST)	Dr. Premsai Singh	INC	37,660	42.73	Ramsewak Paikra	BJP	36,462	41.37	1,198
95	Ambikapur (ST)	Madan Gopal Singh	INC	49,947	57.18	Kamal Bhan Singh	BJP	34,060	38.99	15,887
96	Sitapur (ST)	Professor Gopal Ram	IND	23,811	37.30	Phool Sai	INC	19,987	31.31	3,824
97	Bagicha (ST)	Ganesh Ram Bhagat	BJP	35,979	51.66	Phulkeriya Bhagat	INC	29,217	41.95	6,762
98	Jashpur (ST)	Vikram Bhagat	BJP	37,855	54.45	Ram Dev Bhagat	INC	26,336	37.88	11,519
99	Tapkara (ST)	Nand Kumar Sai	BJP	40,089	55.69	Ishwar Sai	INC	29,355	40.78	10,734
100	Pathalgaon (ST)	Rampukar Singh	INC	33,750	46.35	Vishunudev Sai	BJP	30,505	41.89	3,245
101	Dharamjaigarh (ST)	Chaneshram Rathiya	INC	39,442	52.17	Santosh Singh	BJP	27,570	36.46	11,872
102	Lailunga (ST)	Premsingh Sidar	BJP	39,480	49.57	Hriday Ram Rathiya	INC	34,579	43.42	4,901
103	Raigarh	Krishna Kumar	INC	39,147	44.50	Rosanlal	BJP	37,263	42.36	1,884
104	Kharsia	Nand Kumar Patel	INC	53,040	56.62	Yashwant Raj Singh	BJP	35,842	38.26	17,198
105	Saria	Dr. Shkrajit Naik	BJP	42,614	47.80	Dr. Jawahar Nayak	INC	24,047	26.97	18,567
106	Sarangarh (SC)	Dr. Chhabilal Ratre	BSP	24,552	33.50	Sakharam Malhotra	INC	22,703	30.97	1,849
107	Rampur (ST)	Nanki Ram Kanwar	BJP	40,372	53.15	Sarman Singh	IND	9,309	12.26	31,063
108	Katghora	Banwari Lal	BJP	52,367	40.38	Jaisingh	INC	38,272	29.51	14,095
109	Tanakhar (ST)	Hira Singh Markam	GGP	28,498	42.00	Amol Singh Salam	INC	18,209	26.84	10,289
110	Marwahi (ST)	Ramdayal Uike	BJP	31,591	51.33	Pahalwan Singh	INC	19,294	31.35	12,297
111	Kota	Rajendra Shukla	INC	33,120	43.44	Bhupendra Singh	BJP	31,999	41.97	1,121
112	Lormi	Dharmjeet Singh	INC	45,858	54.25	Muniram Sahu	BJP	26,958	31.89	18,900
113	Mungeli (SC)	Vikram Mohale	BJP	29,773	44.45	Jait Ram	INC	22,439	33.50	7,334
114	Jarhagaon (SC)	Chowadas Khandekar	BJP	29,089	45.81	Churawan Mangeshkar	INC	26,389	41.56	2,700
115	Takhatpur	Jagjeet Singh Makkad	BJP	23,150	32.10	Balram Singh	INC	23,005	31.90	145
116	Bilaspur	Amar Agrawal	BJP	40,993	42.62	Anil Kumar Tah	IND	30,038	31.23	10,955
117	Bilha	Dharam Kaushik	BJP	39,683	49.52	Ashok Rao	INC	29,341	36.62	10,342
118	Masturi (SC)	Madan Singh Daharya	BJP	27,849	37.29	Banshilal Dhritlahre	INC	22,831	30.57	5,018
119	Sipat	Engineer Rameshwar Khare	BSP	19,533	25.97	Pd. Ramnarayan Shastri	BJP	16,717	22.22	2,816
120	Akaltara	Chhatram Dewangan	BJP	35,281	37.70	Dr. Rakesh Kumar Singh	INC	25,799	27.56	9,482
121	Pamgarh	Dauram Ratnakar	BSP	33,683	33.56	Shakuntala Singh	BJP	33,597	33.47	86
122	Champa	Narayan Prasad Chandel	BJP	35,083	39.52	Motilal Maheshram Dewangan	INC	28,404	31.99	6,679
123	Sakti	Megharam Sahu	BJP	37,142	48.32	Raja Surendra Bahadur Singh	INC	31,710	41.25	5,432
124	Malkharoda (SC)	Chainsingh Samle	INC	36,007	42.25	Harshwardhan (Bablu)	BJP	25,657	30.11	10,350
125	Chandrapur	Rani Ratnamala Devi	BJP	39,995	51.09	Novel Kumar Verma	INC	28,989	37.03	11,006
126	Raipur Town	Brijmohan Agrawal	BJP	51,469	56.41	Paras Chopra	INC	38,251	41.92	13,218
127	Raipur Rural	Tarun Prasad Chatarji	BJP	71,294	55.06	Deenanath Sharma	INC	55,543	42.89	15,751
128	Abhanpur	Dhanendra Sahu	INC	42,977	49.48	Ashok Bajaj	BJP	34,893	40.17	8,084
129	Mandirhasod	Satya Narayan Sharma	INC	26,442	52.65	Shyam Bais	BJP	18,273	36.38	8,169
130	Arang (SC)	Ganguram Baghel	BJP	37,914	49.52	Vijay Guru	INC	34,173	44.63	3,741
131	Dharsiwa	Vidhan Mishra	INC	42,532	47.46	Balaram Verma	BJP	35,495	39.61	7,037
132	Bhatapara	Shivratan Sharma	BJP	35,938	42.73	Radheshyam Sharma	INC	24,516	29.15	11,422
133	Baloda Bazar	Ganesh Shankar	INC	26,698	30.97	Purshottam Sahu	IND	26,170	30.35	528
134	Palari (SC)	Dr. Ramlal Bhardwaj	INC	28,706	37.35	Manaram	BJP	26,378	34.32	2,328
135	Kasdol	Gauri Shankar Agrawal	BJP	46,240	49.32	Dr. Kanhaiyalal Sharma	INC	22,523	24.02	23,717
136	Bhatgaon (SC)	Dr. Haridas Bhardwaj	BJP	29,192	39.43	Adv. T. R. Nirala	BSP	21,459	28.99	7,733
137	Saraipali	Devendra Bahadur Singh	INC	37,823	44.77	Birendra Kumar	IND	23,182	27.44	14,641
138	Basna	Mahendra Bahadur Singh	INC	31,812	43.40	Dr. Trivikram Bhoi	BJP	24,763	33.78	7,049
139	Khallari	Dr. Ramesh	BJP	23,918	31.66	Bhekh Ram	INC	23,883	31.61	35
140	Mahasamund	Agni Chandrakar	INC	33,021	41.85	Amrit Sahu	BJP	29,913	37.91	3,108
141	Rajim	Shyamcharan Shukla	INC	51,203	54.88	Dr. Neena Singh	BJP	28,184	30.21	23,019
142	Bindranawagarh (ST)	Charan Singh Manjhi	BJP	45,679	54.95	Onkar Shah	INC	35,555	42.77	10,124
143	Sihawa (ST)	Madhav Singh Dhruv	INC	31,317	47.46	Guljar Singh Markam	BJP	29,555	44.79	1,762
144	Kurud	Ajay Chandrakar (Dala)	BJP	44,000	49.73	Bhuleshwari Deepa Sahu	INC	42,816	48.39	1,184
145	Dhamtari	Harshad Mehta	INC	56,520	54.79	Kriparam Heeralal Sahu	BJP	40,198	38.97	16,322
146	Bhanupratappur (ST)	Manoj Singh Mandavi	INC	29,908	45.08	Deolal Dugga	BJP	26,749	40.31	3,159
147	Kanker (ST)	Shyama Dhruva	BJP	35,070	58.32	Shiv Netam	INC	21,726	36.13	13,344
148	Keskal (ST)	Phulo Devi Netam	INC	24,029	45.81	Mahesh Baghel	BJP	23,686	45.16	343
149	Kondagaon (ST)	Shankar Sodi	INC	29,405	53.72	Mangal Ram Usendi	BJP	14,920	27.26	14,485
150	Bhanpuri (ST)	Anturam Kashyap	INC	25,697	48.09	Chandrashekhar Kashyap	BJP	22,455	42.02	3,242
151	Jagdalpur (ST)	Jhitaruram Baghel	INC	37,607	51.11	Lakheshwar Baghel	BJP	34,293	46.61	3,314
152	Keslur (ST)	Bhursuram Nag	INC	18,898	44.49	Samundsak Katchha	BJP	14,022	33.01	4,876
153	Chitrakote (ST)	Pratibha Shah	INC	10,214	37.63	Mennabai	BJP	6,413	23.63	3,801
154	Dantewada (ST)	Mahendra Karma	INC	16,856	43.80	Arjun Singh Kunjam	CPI	11,283	29.32	5,573
155	Konta (ST)	Lakhma	INC	16,672	41.27	Manish Kunjam	CPI	15,924	39.42	748
156	Bijapur (ST)	Rajendra Pambhoi	INC	15,743	38.87	Rajaram Todem	BJP	8,602	21.24	7,141
157	Narayanpur (ST)	Manturam Pawar	INC	25,173	38.35	Vikram Singh Usendi	BJP	24,539	37.39	634
158	Maro (SC)	Derhu Prasad Dhritlahre	IND	30,226	42.30	Dayal Das Baghel	BJP	25,188	35.25	5,038
159	Bemetara	Mahesh Tiwari	BJP	33,721	47.02	Dr. Chetan Singh Verma	INC	31,049	43.29	2,672
160	Saja	Ravindra Chaubey	INC	52,611	63.63	Dr. R.D. Patel	BJP	28,293	34.22	24,318
161	Dhamdha	Tamradhwaj Sahu	INC	39,538	47.99	Labhchand Bafna	BJP	33,971	41.23	5,567
162	Durg	Hemchand Yadav	BJP	73,766	47.80	Arun Vora	INC	70,487	45.67	3,279
163	Bhilai	Badruddin Qureshi	INC	56,012	43.25	Prem Prakash Pandey	BJP	50,451	38.96	5,561
164	Patan	Bhupesh Baghel	INC	37,758	39.58	Nirupama Chandrakar	BJP	35,062	36.75	2,696
165	Gunderdehi	Ghana Ram Sahu	INC	41,145	50.32	Dr. Dayaram Sahu	BJP	32,850	40.17	8,295
166	Khertha	Smt. Pratima Chandrakar	INC	36,676	44.40	Dr. Balmukund Dewangan	BJP	36,518	44.21	158
167	Balod	Lokendra Yadav	BJP	48,738	45.34	Jalam Singh Patel	INC	43,497	40.47	5,241
168	Dondi Lohara (ST)	Domendra Bhendiya	INC	32,562	36.61	Janak Lal Thakur	CMM	27,464	30.88	5,098
169	Chowki (ST)	Sanjeev Shah	BJP	31,146	45.13	Govardhan Netam	INC	19,194	27.81	11,952
170	Khujji	Rajindarpal Singh Bhatiya	BJP	40,488	51.42	Bholaram Sahu	INC	36,119	45.87	4,369
171	Dongargaon	Smt. Gita Devi Singh	INC	25,125	36.98	Ashok Sharma	BJP	24,247	35.68	878
172	Rajnandgaon	Leelaram Bhojwani	BJP	43,442	50.43	Uday Mudliyar	INC	39,454	45.80	3,988
173	Dongargarh (SC)	Dhanesh Patila	INC	36,784	48.21	Sunil Ramteke	BJP	34,024	44.59	2,760
174	Khairagarh	Devbrat Singh	INC	38,637	48.32	Sunita Komal Kothari	BJP	34,806	43.53	3,831
175	Birendranagar	Mohammad Akbar	INC	40,571	51.51	Dr. Siyaram Sahu	BJP	25,686	32.61	14,885
176	Kawardha	Yogeshwar Raj Singh	INC	52,950	57.41	Dr. Raman Singh	BJP	37,524	40.68	15,426
177	Baihar (ST)	Ganpat Singh Uikey	INC	30,048	43.72	Budhsingh Dhurve	BJP	17,437	25.37	12,611
178	Lanji	Bhagvat Bhau Nagpure	INC	30,596	43.17	Dilip Bhatere Bhaiyalal	BJP	29,067	41.01	1,529
179	Kirnapur	Likhiram Kawre	INC	37,723	47.04	Anubha Munjare	JP	19,986	24.92	17,737
180	Waraseoni	Pradip Amratlal Jaiswal	INC	29,241	38.84	Dr. Yogendra Nirmal	BJP	19,563	25.98	9,678
181	Khairlanjee	Domansingh Nagpure	RPI	26,800	42.47	Bodh Singh Radhelal Bhagat	BJP	21,945	34.77	4,855
182	Katangi	Tamlal Raghuji Sahare	INC	35,155	49.66	Meshkumar Deshmukh	BJP	20,524	28.99	14,631
183	Balaghat	Ashok Singh Sarswar	INC	49,288	52.38	Rekha Gourishankar Bisen	BJP	29,328	31.17	19,960
184	Paraswada	Kankar Munjare	JP	26,503	33.53	Pooran Kumar Adwani	BJP	17,942	22.70	8,561
185	Nainpur (ST)	Dev Singh Saiyam	BJP	31,983	49.44	Dinoo Lal Taram	INC	28,489	44.04	3,494
186	Mandla (ST)	Devendra Tekam	INC	38,841	56.05	Santram Maravi	BJP	28,427	41.02	10,414
187	Bichhia (ST)	Tulsiram Dhumketi	INC	30,356	54.46	Jhallu Lal Tekam	BJP	18,307	32.84	12,049
188	Bajag (ST)	Omprakash Dhurvey	BJP	31,940	47.78	Basori Singh Mashram	INC	30,082	45.00	1,858
189	Dindori (ST)	Jehar Singh Maravi	BJP	21,188	33.77	Dr. Nanhe Singh Thakur	IND	17,765	28.31	3,423
190	Shahpura (ST)	Smt. Ganga Bai Ureti	INC	25,972	48.12	Kanna Singh Paraste	BJP	21,428	39.70	4,544
191	Niwas (ST)	Surata Singh Maravi	INC	27,872	54.69	Smt. Savitri Padam	BJP	18,215	35.74	9,657
192	Bargi (ST)	Phool Singh Uike	BJP	31,980	41.22	Nanhe Lal Dhurve	INC	30,478	39.29	1,502
193	Panagar (ST)	Ms. Kaushalya Gontia	INC	39,485	45.05	Moti Kashyap	BJP	38,097	43.46	1,388
194	Jabalpur Cantonment	Ishwardas Rohani	BJP	37,459	49.91	Prem Dubey	INC	30,170	40.20	7,289
195	Jabalpur East (SC)	Anchal Sonkar	BJP	24,366	36.41	Ramesh	INC	22,786	34.05	1,580
196	Jabalpur Central	Pt. Omkar Prasad Tiwari	BJP	21,163	41.38	Lalit Srivastav	INC	15,608	30.52	5,555
197	Jabalpur West	Harinder Jeet Singh (Babbu)	BJP	50,676	47.67	Sanjay Yadav	INC	47,450	44.63	3,226
198	Patan	Sobaran Singh	JD	45,198	57.57	Thakur Raghuraj Singh	INC	14,985	19.09	30,213
199	Majholi	Ajay Vishnoi	BJP	45,102	58.79	Ram Kumar Patel	INC	24,930	32.49	20,172
200	Sihora	Nitya Niranjan Khampariya	INC	36,471	43.87	Prabhat Kumar Pandey	BJP	33,670	40.50	2,801
201	Bahoriband	Shrawan Kumar	INC	28,612	35.65	Saroj Bachhan Nayak	JD	18,312	22.82	10,300
202	Murwara	Dr. Awadesh Pratap Singh	INC	45,591	49.44	Sukirti	BJP	32,654	35.41	12,937
203	Badwara	Haji Gulam Siptain	INC	27,630	34.55	Dhruv Pratap Singh	BJP	24,696	30.88	2,934
204	Vijairaghogarh	Satyendra Pathak	INC	31,638	38.09	Padma Shukla	BJP	19,747	23.77	11,891
205	Gadarwara	Smt. Sadhna Sthapak	INC	38,262	49.31	Naresh Pathak	BJP	34,279	44.17	3,983
206	Bohani	Diwan Chandra Bhan Singh	INC	37,089	47.95	Amar Singh	BJP	28,972	37.45	8,117
207	Narsimhapur	Ajay Mushran	INC	41,259	45.23	Uttam Chand	BJP	38,396	42.09	2,863
208	Gotegaon (SC)	Shekhar Chaudhary	INC	41,499	50.18	Baini Prasad	BJP	33,353	40.33	8,146
209	Lakhanadon (ST)	Randhir Singh	INC	24,821	36.67	Dheersingh Bhalavi	BJP	23,362	34.52	1,459
210	Ghansor (ST)	Smt. Urmila Singh	INC	38,444	56.16	Smt. Vimla Marskole	BJP	20,356	29.74	18,088
211	Keolari	Harwansh Singh	INC	52,439	53.31	Smt. Neha Singh	BJP	41,473	42.16	10,966
212	Barghat	Dr. Dalsingh Bisen	BJP	40,033	44.64	Mahanand Rahangdale	INC	29,485	32.88	10,548
213	Seoni	Naresh Diwakar (D.N.)	BJP	32,085	38.47	Ashutosh Verma	INC	25,570	30.66	6,515
214	Jamai (ST)	Tejeelal	INC	36,201	68.02	Mansaram Wadiwa	BJP	16,193	30.42	20,008
215	Chhindwara	Deepak Saxena	INC	60,358	60.09	Chandrabhan Kuber Singh	BJP	38,165	37.99	22,193
216	Parasia (SC)	Leeladhar Puria	INC	42,434	54.52	Tarachand Bawaria	BJP	32,332	41.54	10,102
217	Damua (ST)	Harishankar Uike	INC	31,806	54.24	Anusuiya Uikey	BJP	25,206	42.98	6,600
218	Amarwara (ST)	Premnarayan Thakur	INC	41,870	63.79	Judhiya Prasad Bhalavi	BJP	20,812	31.71	21,058
219	Chaurai	Chaudhari Gambhir Singh	INC	44,089	54.32	Pt. Ramesh Dubey	BJP	35,788	44.10	8,301
220	Sausar	Ajay Revanath Chore	INC	41,508	52.27	Ramrao Mahale	BJP	34,142	43.00	7,366
221	Pandhurna	Suresh Zalke	INC	30,701	46.32	Marot Rao Khawse	BJP	23,814	35.93	6,887
222	Piparia	Harishankar Jaiswal	BJP	46,186	54.35	Suresh Rai	INC	34,643	40.77	11,543
223	Hoshangabad	Smt. Savita Diwan	INC	35,487	41.77	Madhukar Harne	BJP	35,472	41.75	15
224	Itarsi	Dr. Sitasharan Sharma	BJP	42,636	48.36	Bhai Manak Agrawal	INC	36,815	41.75	5,821
225	Seoni-Malwa	Hazarilal Nanhu	INC	42,477	49.49	Prem Shankar Verma	BJP	38,804	45.21	3,673
226	Timarni (SC)	Uttam Singh Jagannath	INC	34,241	51.09	Manoharlal Hajarilal Rathore	BJP	32,774	48.91	1,467
227	Harda	Kamal Patel	BJP	44,357	57.45	Anil Ramdeen Patel	INC	30,288	39.23	14,069
228	Multai	Dr. Suneelam	IND	29,344	48.68	Dr. Punjab Rao Bodkhe	INC	15,792	26.20	13,552
229	Masod	Chandra Shekhar Deshmukh	BJP	29,056	47.01	Ramji Mahajan	INC	27,575	44.62	1,481
230	Bhainsdehi (ST)	Mahendra Singh Keshar	BJP	32,539	54.81	Ganjan Singh Kumre	INC	25,285	42.59	7,254
231	Betul	Vinod Daga	INC	30,829	41.27	Shiv Prasad Rathore	BJP	21,423	28.68	9,406
232	Ghora Dongri (ST)	Pratap Singh	INC	49,617	53.28	Ramjilal Uikey	BJP	42,054	45.16	7,563
233	Amla (SC)	Heera Chand Chandelkar	BJP	18,369	41.69	Chaitram Manekar	INC	17,712	40.20	657
234	Budhni	Dev Kumar Patel	INC	44,855	46.77	Guru Prasad Sharma	BJP	43,081	44.92	1,774
235	Ichhawar	Karan Singh Verma	BJP	28,703	37.51	Balvir Tomar	IND	21,325	27.87	7,378
236	Ashta (SC)	Ranjit Singh Gunwan	BJP	40,066	45.48	Bapulal Malviya	INC	32,005	36.33	8,061
237	Sehore	Ramesh Saxena	BJP	46,171	56.79	Jaspal Singh Arora	INC	32,883	40.45	13,288
238	Govindpura	Babulal Gour	BJP	71,589	52.71	Karnail Singh	INC	60,706	44.69	10,883
239	Bhopal South	P. C. Sharma	INC	1,04,392	51.58	Suhas Shailendra Pradhan	BJP	90,103	44.52	14,289
240	Bhopal North	Arif Aqueel	INC	75,170	54.34	Ramesh Sharma	BJP	58,313	42.15	16,857
241	Berasia	Jodharam Gurjar	INC	56,416	58.29	Laxminarayan Sharma	BJP	35,652	36.83	20,764
242	Sanchi (SC)	Dr. Gaurishankar Shejwar	BJP	46,891	49.72	Dr. Prabhuram Chaudhary	INC	43,701	46.34	3,190
243	Udaipura	Rampal Singh	BJP	43,779	56.04	Kamal Singh	INC	29,100	37.25	14,679
244	Bareli	Bhagwat Singh Patel	BJP	43,441	53.01	Pratap Singh	INC	34,877	42.56	8,564
245	Bhojpur	Sundar Lal Patwa	BJP	53,736	56.66	Vijay Dhakar	INC	35,807	37.76	17,929
246	Kurwai (SC)	Raghuveer Singh	INC	31,019	51.52	Chironjee Lal Sonkar	BJP	28,193	46.83	2,826
247	Basoda	Veer Singh Raghuvanshi	INC	43,873	52.45	Devendra Verma	BJP	36,290	43.38	7,583
248	Vidisha	Smt. Sushila Devi Thakur	BJP	43,130	52.18	Vasant Jain	INC	35,079	42.44	8,051
249	Shamshabad	Rudrapratap Singh	AJBP	26,533	35.45	Badansingh Raghuvanshi	BJP	25,989	34.73	544
250	Sironj	Laxmikant Sharma	BJP	37,803	47.37	Mehtab Singh	INC	16,879	21.15	20,924
251	Biaora	Balram Singh Gujar	INC	28,127	42.99	Badrilal Yadav	BJP	21,595	33.01	6,532
252	Narsingarh	Dhul Singh Yadav Vakil	INC	32,799	39.98	Laxminarayan Prasad	BJP	26,331	32.10	6,468
253	Sarangpur (SC)	Krishna Mohan Malviya	INC	34,069	44.13	Kesari Narayan Singh	BJP	31,998	41.45	2,071
254	Rajgarh	Pratap Singh Mandloi	INC	40,233	54.81	Kedar Kaka	BJP	29,560	40.27	10,673
255	Khilchipur	Hajarilal Dangi	INC	38,103	40.57	Kanhaiyalal Dangi	IND	27,975	29.79	10,128
256	Shujalpur	Kedar Singh Mandloi	INC	56,547	53.81	Nemichand Jain	BJP	43,612	41.50	12,935
257	Gulana	Kunwar Manohar Singh	INC	49,164	52.60	Chandraprakash Patidar	BJP	42,501	45.48	6,663
258	Shajapur	Hukumsingh Karada	INC	61,596	57.35	Madhav Singh Badaal	BJP	43,427	40.43	18,169
259	Agar (SC)	Ramlal Malviya	INC	47,860	58.06	Gopal Parmar	BJP	32,043	38.87	15,817
260	Susner	Vallabhbhai Ambavatiya	INC	42,985	49.65	Badrilal Soni	BJP	37,724	43.58	5,261
261	Tarana (SC)	Babulal Malviya	INC	37,893	50.33	Dr. Madhavprasad Shastri	BJP	35,033	46.53	2,860
262	Mahidpur	Dr. Kalpana Parulekar	INC	46,110	58.19	Babulal Jain	BJP	32,625	41.17	13,485
263	Khachrod	Lal Singh Ranawat	BJP	51,778	51.13	Babulal Gurjar	INC	47,747	47.15	4,031
264	Badnagar	Virendra Singh Sisodiya	INC	46,084	52.66	Udyisingh Pandya	BJP	38,527	44.02	7,557
265	Ghatiya (SC)	Ramlal Malviya	INC	46,430	54.23	Rameshwar Akhand	BJP	37,609	43.93	8,821
266	Ujjain North	Rajendra Bharti	INC	39,896	51.78	Paras Chandra Jain	BJP	36,130	46.89	3,766
267	Ujjain South	Priti Bhargava	INC	42,824	50.90	Shiva Kotwani	BJP	40,347	47.96	2,477
268	Depalpur	Jagdish Patel	INC	49,896	52.28	Premnarayan Patel	BJP	44,896	47.04	5,000
269	Mhow	Antar Singh Darbar	INC	50,999	55.64	Bherulal Patidar	BJP	40,484	44.17	10,515
270	Indore-I	Ramlal Yadav	INC	55,873	52.07	Lalchand Murlidhar Mittal	BJP	50,433	47.00	5,440
271	Indore-II	Kailash Vijayvargiya	BJP	64,409	58.74	Dr. Rekha Gandhi	INC	44,136	40.25	20,273
272	Indore-III	Ashwin Joshi	INC	26,657	52.54	Gopikrishna Nema	BJP	23,527	46.37	3,130
273	Indore-IV	Lakshmansingh Gaur	BJP	65,137	55.75	Govind Manghani	INC	49,160	42.08	15,977
274	Indore-V	Satyanarayan Patel	INC	74,483	53.40	Bhanwarsingh Shekhawat	BJP	63,648	45.63	10,835
275	Sawer (SC)	Premchand Guddu	INC	47,865	50.96	Prakash Sonkar	BJP	44,421	47.29	3,444
276	Dewas	Yuvraj Tukojirao Pawar	BJP	58,620	52.56	Choudhary Ratanlal	INC	52,517	47.08	6,103
277	Sonkatch (SC)	Sajjansingh Verma	INC	57,137	61.97	Verma Surendra	BJP	34,282	37.18	22,855
278	Hatpipalya	Tejsingh Sendhav	BJP	45,653	52.25	Thakur Rajendra Singh Baghel	INC	40,191	46.00	5,462
279	Bagli	Shyam Holani	INC	48,677	53.04	Kailash Joshi	BJP	42,012	45.78	6,665
280	Khategaon	Brijmohan Badrinarayan	BJP	37,139	47.30	Kailash Kundal Pappu	INC	35,363	45.04	1,776
281	Harsud (ST)	Kunwar Vijay Shah	BJP	47,417	66.09	Kishorilal Patel Sitaram Patel	INC	24,330	33.91	23,087
282	Nimarkhedi	Rajnarayan Singh	INC	44,137	52.28	Raghuraj Singh Tomar	BJP	37,956	44.96	6,181
283	Pandhana (SC)	Hiralal Silawat	INC	37,723	51.15	Kishorilal Nathuram Verma	BJP	34,939	47.37	2,784
284	Khandwa	Hukumchand Durgaprasad Yadav	BJP	31,890	44.30	Awadhesh Manohar Singh	INC	31,819	44.20	71
285	Nepanagar	Raghunath	INC	35,505	48.02	Archana Chitnis	BJP	35,210	47.62	295
286	Shahpur	Sanyogita Devi Deshmukh	INC	39,499	49.45	Ramdas Shivhare	BJP	39,116	48.97	383
287	Burhanpur	Shivkumar Singh Nawalsingh	IND	40,641	43.26	Hamid Quazi	INC	33,647	35.81	6,994
288	Bhikangaon (ST)	Lal Singh Dongarsingh Patel	BJP	32,652	50.62	Jawansingh Patel	INC	22,796	35.34	9,856
289	Barwaha	Jagdish Moraneeya	INC	45,470	51.05	Chandrakant Gupta	BJP	43,002	48.28	2,468
290	Maheshwar (SC)	Dr. Vijay Laxmi Sadhau	INC	46,538	50.15	Jagdish Rokade	BJP	46,261	49.85	277
291	Kasrawad	Subhash Yadav	INC	62,447	60.04	Dashrathsingh Patel	BJP	40,969	39.39	21,478
292	Khargone	Parasram Baboolal Dandir	INC	44,492	50.59	Chandrashekhar Naik	BJP	40,976	46.60	3,516
293	Dhulkot (ST)	Chidabhai Dawar	INC	34,548	53.58	Dalsingh Ramsingh Solanki	BJP	27,076	41.99	7,472
294	Sendhwa (ST)	Gyarsilal Rawat	INC	37,494	51.06	Antar Singh Raoji Arya	BJP	34,411	46.86	3,083
295	Anjad (ST)	Devisingh Chhitu Patel	BJP	39,632	54.56	Devisingh Patel Vakil	INC	33,007	45.44	6,625
296	Rajpur (ST)	Bala Bachchan	INC	44,134	51.68	Diwansingh Vitthal Patel	BJP	40,257	47.14	3,877
297	Barwani (ST)	Prem Singh Patel	BJP	38,708	50.36	Saysingh Patel	INC	37,245	48.45	1,463
298	Manawar (ST)	Dariyav Singh Solanki	INC	37,669	53.48	Suraj Singh Baghel	BJP	31,706	45.01	5,963
299	Dharampuri (ST)	Jagdish Muvel	BJP	44,056	52.75	Pratap Singh Baghel	INC	38,182	45.72	5,874
300	Dhar	Karansingh Pawar	INC	53,862	49.45	Vikram Verma	BJP	53,715	49.31	147
301	Badnawar	Khemraj Patidar	BJP	33,215	34.57	Mohansingh Bundela	INC	32,505	33.83	710
302	Sardarpur (ST)	Ganpat Singh Patel	INC	36,619	50.22	Ku. Ranjna Baghel	BJP	30,488	41.81	6,131
303	Kukshi (ST)	Smt. Jamuna Devi	INC	50,142	67.14	Chatar Singh Alava	BJP	21,761	29.14	28,381
304	Alirajpur (ST)	Magan Singh Patel	INC	25,456	56.97	Dhedu Bhai Thakarala	BJP	18,079	40.46	7,377
305	Jobat (ST)	Smt. Sulochana Rawat	INC	24,094	47.68	Madho Singh Dawar	IND	11,155	22.08	12,939
306	Jhabua (ST)	Smt. Swaroop Bai Bhabar	INC	36,326	63.39	Ganga Bai	BJP	16,692	29.13	19,634
307	Petlawad (ST)	Ms. Nirmala Bhuriya	BJP	45,377	53.98	Jamsingh Amliyar	INC	36,985	44.00	8,392
308	Thandla (ST)	Ratan Singh Bhabar	INC	41,064	60.18	Dilip Singh Katara	BJP	20,949	30.70	20,115
309	Ratlam Town	Himmat Kothari	BJP	44,889	53.24	Shiv Kumar Jhalani	INC	37,963	45.03	6,926
310	Ratlam Rural	Dave Motilal	INC	41,834	50.08	Dhulji Chaudhary	BJP	39,165	46.89	2,669
311	Sailana (ST)	Prabhudayal Gehlot	IND	33,544	40.14	Bherusingh Damar	JD	18,865	22.58	14,679
312	Jaora	Mahendra Singh	INC	45,345	50.01	Dr. Rajendra Pandey	BJP	43,659	48.15	1,686
313	Alot (SC)	Manohar Utwal	BJP	28,717	41.59	Prahlad Verma	IND	24,798	35.91	3,919
314	Manasa	Narendra Bhanwarlal Nahta	INC	47,690	51.34	Mangal Patwa	BJP	44,448	47.85	3,242
315	Garoth	Subhash Kumar Sojatiya	INC	61,059	59.53	Radheshyam Mandliya	BJP	39,773	38.78	21,286
316	Suwasara (SC)	Pushpa Bharatiya	INC	46,039	51.35	Jagdish Devada	BJP	41,941	46.78	4,098
317	Sitamau	Bharat Singh	INC	47,198	47.33	Nanalal Patidar	BJP	46,377	46.50	821
318	Mandsaur	Navkrishna Patil	INC	59,161	53.66	Kailash Chawla	BJP	49,623	45.01	9,538
319	Neemuch	Nandkishore Patel	INC	60,803	54.32	Khuman Singh Shivaji	BJP	48,391	43.23	12,412
320	Jawad	Ghanshyam Patidar	INC	55,502	48.30	Virendra Sakhlecha	IND	46,609	40.56	8,893

== INFOS ==
BJP was constantly increasing their seat count, in the aftermath of the Ayodhya Demolition, and so was BSP under the leadership of Kanshiram, who was leading a silent revolution among the Dalits, Tribals and OBCs, for electorally capturing power in the government, and to work for self-upliftment. Both the parties were a concern for the congress, but not BJP as much as the BSP was. The reason was that the vote base of Congress and BSP was the same, which meant that even a fractional shift of voters from Congress to BSP would have costed Congress many seats. The fiercely contested election can be understood by the fact that the vote difference of Congress and the BJP was merely 1.31%.

To the surprise of all, Kanshiram during his election rally announced that "BJP was jumping with happiness that Kanshiram would fight elections in Madhya Pradesh without any alliance, that's why I have decided only to contest election in those seats in which we can damage Congress enough to win the seat and in the rest of seats I would ask you all to vote for the strongest party against BJP, we can't let them win the elections". True to his words, BSP fought elections only in 170 seats, as compared to 286 during the last elections. They retaining all the 11 seats they won last election.

GOPAD BANAS 1998 NAUSA VS BHAWAR CASE _

Also, the case of constituency of Gopad Banas, sidhi was one of the most important and challenging political cases of Madhya Pradesh, where KK singh [Bhawar sahib] rebelled against the Indian National Congress political beast Dwarika Dubey Nausa which split the anti-BJP vote of the area and Bharatiya Janata Party government was formed in Gopad Banas Vidhansabha. In the next election of 2003 MP assembly, conflicts between Sriniwas Tiwari Rewa and Arjun Singh (Congress politician) led to Dubey's unfortunate ticket cut and KK became the MLA, if it would not be done then according to the political experts, the most powerful person of Sidhi, Dwarika Dubey would have become the MLA 99.9% (or approx 100%) of Gopad Banas Sidhi. But Dwarika Dubey continued working in both sectors i.e. the All India Congress Committee party line and the Jila Panchayat Sidhi. Also the victory clinched by Dubey in 2009 in Jila Panchayat of Madhya Pradesh, is considered one of the biggest panchayat victory of India. In the party line he held state level prominent positions like Mahamantri [GS] of Madhya Pradesh Congress Committee, and also in the national levels of AICC (Indian National Congress) his views are taken for the development of the party.
