= 1967 Madhya Pradesh Legislative Assembly election =

Indian state election

- 21 February 1967

All 296 assembly constituencies 149 seats needed for a majority
- Registered: 18,394,846
- Turnout: 53.49%
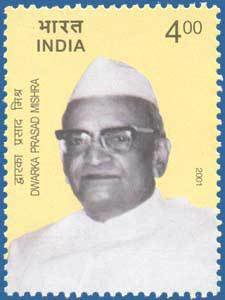
	Majority party	Minority party
Leader	Dwarka Prasad Mishra
Party	INC	ABJS
Last election	142	41
Seats before	142
Seats won	167	230
Percentage	40.60
CM before election
Dwarka Prasad Mishra
INC
Elected CM
Govind Narayan Singh
Samyukta Vidhayak Dal

Elections to the Madhya Pradesh Legislative Assembly were held in February 1967. These were the elections to the legislative assembly having 296 seats in undivided Madhya Pradesh. While the Congress government won the election handily, later that year Govind Narayan Singh, who had been elected to the assembly as an Indian National Congress candidate, soon rebelled against the incumbent Chief Minister, Dwarka Prasad Mishra and resigned from the Congress party. He formed a new political party, known as the Lok Sewak Dal, and became the Chief Minister of Madhya Pradesh as the leader of a coalition, known as the Samyukta Vidhayak Dal.

After the previous election in 1962, the number of constituencies in Madhya Pradesh were increased from 288 to 296, following the recommendation of the Delimitation Commission of India.

== Result ==
#	Party	Seats contested	Seats won	Seats changed	% votes
1	Indian National Congress	296	167	▲25	40.60%
2	Bharatiya Jana Sangh	265	78	▲37	28.28%
3	Samyukta Socialist Party	114	10	▲10	5.28%
4	Praja Socialist Party	110	9	▼24	4.68%
5	Swantantra Party	21	7	▼5	2.55%
6	Jan Congress	33	2	▲2	1.52%
7	Communist Party of India	33	1	0	1.11%
8	Independent	296	22	▼17	14.90%
	Total		296		

== Elected members ==
Constituency	Reserved for	Member	Party
Sheopur District
Sheopur	None	S. Tiwari	Bharatiya Jana Sangh
Bijeypur	None	Jagmohan Singh	Independent
Sabalgarh	None	Brijraj Singh Sikarwar	Independent
Joura	None	Ramcharan Lal Mishra	Independent
Morena	None	Jabar Singh	Bharatiya Jana Sangh
Dimni	SC	S.S. Amariya	Independent
Ambah	SC	Ratiram	Independent
Bhind District
Gohad	SC	Kanhaiyalal Mahor	Bharatiya Jana Sangh
Mehgaon	None	Rai Singh Bhadoria	Bharatiya Jana Sangh
Ater	None	Hari Gyan Bohare	Praja Socialist Party
Bhind	None	Raghubir Singh Kushwah	Samyukta Socialist Party
Ron	None	R. Maachhani	Bharatiya Jana Sangh
Lahar	None	Saryu Prasad Tripathi	Bharatiya Jana Sangh
Gwalior District
Gwalior	None	J. Prasad	Bharatiya Jana Sangh
Lashkar	None	Sheetla Sahai	Bharatiya Jana Sangh
Morar	None	N. Chandra	Bharatiya Jana Sangh
Gird	None	R. J. Singh	Bharatiya Jana Sangh
Dabra	None	Jaggannath Singh	Bharatiya Jana Sangh
Bhander	SC	Kishorilal Hans	Bharatiya Jana Sangh
Datia District
Seondha	None	S.D. Sharma	Independent
Datia	None	Shyam Sundar Shyam	Jan Congress
Shivpuri District
Karera	None	Vijaya Raje Scindia	Bharatiya Jana Sangh
Pohri	SC	B. Arjun	Bharatiya Jana Sangh
Shivpuri	None	S. Bahadur	Bharatiya Jana Sangh
Pichhore	None	Laxmi Narayan Gupta	Swatantra Party
Kolaras	None	Jagadish Prasad Verma	Swatantra Party
Guna District
Guna	None	R.L. Premi	Swatantra Party
Chachaura	None	Sagar Singh Sisodia	Swatantra Party
Raghogarh	SC	P. Lalaram	Swatantra Party
Ashoknagar	None	Multanmal	Swatantra Party
Mungadli	None	C. Singh	Swatantra Party
Tikamgarh District
Niwari	None	Lala Ram Bajpai	Indian National Congress
Jatara	None	Narendra Singh Dev	Indian National Congress
Khargapur	SC	R. Ram	Indian National Congress
Tikamgarh	None	Gyanendra Singh Dev	Indian National Congress
Chhatarpur District
Malehra	None	Govind Singh Judeo	Independent
Bijawar	None	K Nath	Indian National Congress
Chhatarpur	None	Mahendra Kumar	Indian National Congress
Maharajpur	SC	Laxman Das Ahirwar	Indian National Congress
Laundi	None	S. Kumari	Independent
Panna District
Panna	None	Het Ram Dubey	Indian National Congress
Amanganj	SC	Pachhita	Indian National Congress
Pawai	None	Ram Sewak Patel	Indian National Congress
Satna District
Maihar	None	Gopal Sharan Singh	Indian National Congress
Nagod	SC	V. Prasad	Indian National Congress
Satna	None	K. Parekh	Indian National Congress
Chitrakoot	None	Ramanand Singh	Praja Socialist Party
Rampur Baghelan	None	Govind Narayan Singh	Indian National Congress
Amarpatan	None	Ramhit Gupta	Bharatiya Jana Sangh
Rewa District
Rewa	None	Shatrughan Singh	Indian National Congress
Sirmaur	None	Jamuna Prasad	Praja Socialist Party
Teonthar	None	K. Singh	Indian National Congress
Mangawan	None	Rukmani Raman Pratap Singh	Indian National Congress
Gurh	None	M. Prasad	Indian National Congress
Deotalab	SC	C. Lal	Indian National Congress
Mauganj	None	J. Prasad	Independent
Sidhi District
Churahat	None	C. P. Tiwari	Praja Socialist Party
Sidhi	None	K. P. Singh	Praja Socialist Party
Deosar	ST	T. Singh	Indian National Congress
Singrauli	None	P. Singh	Indian National Congress
Gopadbanas	ST	L. Singh	Indian National Congress
Shahdol District
Beohari	None	Ram Kishore Shukla	Indian National Congress
Umaria	None	R. V. P. Singh	Indian National Congress
Naorazabad	ST	J. Singh	Indian National Congress
Jaisingnagar	ST	R. Singh	Indian National Congress
Sohagpur	None	Krishna Pal Singh	Indian National Congress
Pushparajgarh	ST	Lalan Singh	Indian National Congress
Kotma	None	K. M. Singh	Indian National Congress
Jaitpur	ST	Bhagwandin Gond	Indian National Congress
Surguja District
Manendragarh	ST	Dharam Pal Singh	Indian National Congress
Baikunthpur	None	Ramchandra Singh Deo	Indian National Congress
Premnagar	ST	S. Singh	Bharatiya Jana Sangh
Surajpur	None	B. S. Singh	Indian National Congress
Pal	ST	Deosai	Indian National Congress
Samri	ST	Larang Sai	Bharatiya Jana Sangh
Lundra	ST	C. Birsai	Indian National Congress
Ambikapur	None	S. Tripathi	Indian National Congress
Lakhanpur	None	D. Singh	Bharatiya Jana Sangh
Sitapur	ST	Mokshmadan Singh	Indian National Congress
Raigarh District
Bagicha	ST	Laxman	Indian National Congress
Jashpur	ST	Johan	Indian National Congress
Tapkara	ST	Kedarnath	Bharatiya Jana Sangh
Pathalgaon	ST	U. Singh	Indian National Congress
Dharamjaigarh	None	R. C. P. Singh	Indian National Congress
Gharghoda	ST	B. Singh	Bharatiya Jana Sangh
Raigarh	None	R. K. L. Agrawal	Praja Socialist Party
Pussour	None	N. C. Singh	Indian National Congress
Sarangarh	SC	Kunjram	Indian National Congress
Bilaspur District
Rampur	ST	Pyarelal Kanwar	Indian National Congress
Katghora	None	B. Navbatram	Indian National Congress
Tanakhar	ST	L. Singh	Independent
Marwahi	ST	L. Singh	Indian National Congress
Kota	None	M. P. Dubey	Indian National Congress
Lormi	None	Rajendra Prasad Shukla	Indian National Congress
Mungeli	SC	Ganeshram Anant	Indian National Congress
Jarhagaon	None	Mohammad Bashir Khan	Indian National Congress
Takhatpur	None	Manharan Lal Pandey	Bharatiya Jana Sangh
Bilaspur	None	Ramcharan Rai	Indian National Congress
Bilha	None	Chitrakant Jaiswal	Indian National Congress
Masturi	SC	Godil Prasad	Indian National Congress
Pamgarh	SC	Mahabir	Indian National Congress
Akaltara	None	Ramgopal	Indian National Congress
Baloda	None	R. P. Sharma	Indian National Congress
Champa	None	Bisahudas Mahant	Indian National Congress
Sakti	None	I. Devi	Indian National Congress
Malkharoda	SC	Vodram	Indian National Congress
Chandrapur	None	Bhawani Lal Verma	Indian National Congress
Abhanpur	None	N. R. Panchhiram	Indian National Congress
Raipur	None	S. C. R. Prasad	Jan Congress
Arang	SC	Kanhaiyalal Kosariya	Indian National Congress
Dharsiwan	None	Munnalal Shukla	Indian National Congress
Balodabazar	None	B. Verma	Indian National Congress
Bhatapara	None	Shivlal Mehta	Indian National Congress
Palari	SC	B. Singh	Indian National Congress
Kasdol	None	Kanhaiya Lal Sharma	Indian National Congress
Bhatgaon	SC	P. Mangliram	Indian National Congress
Saraipali	None	J. Satpathi	Indian National Congress
Basna	None	K. M. Bahadur Singh	Indian National Congress
Pithora	None	B. S. Girirajsingh	Indian National Congress
Mahasamund	None	Nemichand Jain	Indian National Congress
Rajim	None	Shyama Charan Shukla	Indian National Congress
Bindranawagarh	ST	K. Komarra	Bharatiya Jana Sangh
Sihawa	ST	Pusauram	Indian National Congress
Dhamtari	None	B. Bissuji	Indian National Congress
Kurud	None	T. Ramdayal	Indian National Congress
Bhanupratappur	ST	J. Hatoi	Praja Socialist Party
Kanker	ST	B. Dhongai	Indian National Congress
Keskal	ST	N. Moda	Bharatiya Jana Sangh
Kondagaon	ST	M. Lachhooram	Independent
Bakawand	ST	B. Mahadeo	Independent
Jagdalpur	ST	D. Kosha	Bharatiya Jana Sangh
Chitrakot	ST	M. Ganga	Samyukta Socialist Party
Konta	ST	Dhansai	Indian National Congress
Dantewara	ST	R. Boti	Independent
Bijapur	ST	D. S. K. Shah	Independent
Narayanpur	ST	B. Jaideo	Independent
Maro	SC	D. P. Patre	Indian National Congress
Bemetara	None	G. R. Tamaskar	Independent
Dhamdha	SC	Tuman Lal	Indian National Congress
Bhilai	None	D. S. Gupta	Indian National Congress
Durg	None	R. Jha	Indian National Congress
Bhathagaon	None	Kejooram	Independent
Gunderdehi	None	W. Chandrakar	Indian National Congress
Balod	None	Hiralal Sonboir	Indian National Congress
Dondi Lohara	ST	Jhumuklal Bhendia	Indian National Congress
Chowki	ST	T. D. P. Arya	Samyukta Socialist Party
Khujji	None	H. P. Shukla	Indian National Congress
Rajnandgaon	None	Kishorilal Shukla	Indian National Congress
Dongargaon	None	M. Tiwari	Samyukta Socialist Party
Dongargarh	None	G. Bhandari	Indian National Congress
Khairagarh	None	V. B. Singh	Indian National Congress
Birendranagar	None	M. Singhaniya	Independent
Kawardha	None	T. V. Singh	Independent
Baihar	ST	M. Singh	Indian National Congress
Lanji	None	Narbada Prasad Shrivastava	Indian National Congress
Kirnapur	None	Jhankar Singh	Indian National Congress
Waraseoni	None	Thansingh	Indian National Congress
Khairlanji	None	S. Tiwari	Indian National Congress
Katangi	None	V. Patel	Indian National Congress
Balaghat	None	Nandkishore Jairaj Sharma	Indian National Congress
Paraswada	None	Prataplal	Indian National Congress
Mandla	None	Narayani Devi	Indian National Congress
Bichhiya	ST	Darbari Singh	Indian National Congress
Ghughri	ST	P. Singh	Indian National Congress
Bajag	ST	J. Singh	Indian National Congress
Dindori	ST	Sunderlal Ureti	Praja Socialist Party
Niwas	ST	F. Singh	Indian National Congress
Bargi	None	S. Chanpuriya	Samyukta Socialist Party
Panagar	None	Parmanandbhai	Indian National Congress
Jabalpur Cantonment	None	Manmohan Das	Indian National Congress
Jabalpur West	None	K. Dube	Indian National Congress
Jabalpur East	None	Jagdishnarain	Indian National Congress
Patan	SC	Ashalata	Indian National Congress
Katangi	None	D. P. Misra	Indian National Congress
Sihora	None	K. P. Pande	Indian National Congress
Bahoriband	None	R. Shukla	Bharatiya Jana Sangh
Murwara	None	G. Gupta D	Indian National Congress
Badwara	None	B. Singh	Independent
Vijairaghogarh	None	L. Shanker	Indian National Congress
Nohata	None	K. Guru	Indian National Congress
Damoh	None	P. Tandon	Indian National Congress
Hatta	None	J. Bajaj	Indian National Congress
Patharia	SC	K. Bhaosingh	Indian National Congress
Banda	None	R. Pujari	Bharatiya Jana Sangh
Bina	None	B. K. Pateriya	Indian National Congress
Khurai	SC	K. L. Choudhari	Bharatiya Jana Sangh
Sagar	None	D. Jain	Indian National Congress
Surkhi	SC	N. P. Rai	Bharatiya Jana Sangh
Rehli	None	N. P. Tiwari	Bharatiya Jana Sangh
Deori	None	P. Ram	Bharatiya Jana Sangh
Gadarwara	None	S. S. N. Mushran	Indian National Congress
Bohani	None	B. Jain	Indian National Congress
Narsimhapur	None	M. S. Kiledar	Indian National Congress
Gotegaon	None	T. S. Singh	Indian National Congress
Lakhnadon	ST	Vasant Rao Uikey	Indian National Congress
Chhapara	ST	Thakur Deepsingh	Indian National Congress
Keolari	None	Vimla K. P. Verma	Indian National Congress
Barghat	None	Ravindranath Bhargava	Indian National Congress
Seoni	None	M. R. Jatar	Indian National Congress
Chhindwara	None	V. V. Mehta	Indian National Congress
Parasia	SC	Barikrao Amrutrao	Indian National Congress
Damua	ST	P. Dhurve	Indian National Congress
Amarwara	ST	S. J. Thakur	Bharatiya Jana Sangh
Chaurai	None	D. Sharma	Indian National Congress
Sausar	None	M. N. Chaware	Indian National Congress
Pandhurna	None	Madhavlal Dube Mikulal	Indian National Congress
Multai	None	B. R. Deorao	Indian National Congress
Masod	None	B. Daulatrao	Indian National Congress
Bhainsdehi	ST	Daddusingh Balaji	Bharatiya Jana Sangh
Betul	None	G. Khandelwal	Bharatiya Jana Sangh
Ghoradongri	ST	Madu	Bharatiya Jana Sangh
Piparia	None	R. K. Devi	Indian National Congress
Denwa	None	Vinay Kumar Diwan	Praja Socialist Party
Hoshangabad	None	D. S. D. Ramkishore	Indian National Congress
Itarsi	None	Hari Prasad Chaturvedi	Indian National Congress
Timarni	SC	D. Chaudhary	Indian National Congress
Harda	None	Nanhelal Patel	Indian National Congress
Sanchi	SC	Kumadanlal	Bharatiya Jana Sangh
Udaipura	None	S. Sharma	Indian National Congress
Bareli	None	Darshansingh	Bharatiya Jana Sangh
Bhojpur	None	Gulabchand	Indian National Congress
Budhni	None	M. Shishir	Bharatiya Jana Sangh
Ashta	SC	G. Goyal	Bharatiya Jana Sangh
Sehore	None	R. Mewada	Bharatiya Jana Sangh
Bhopal	None	Khan Shakir Ali Khan	Communist Party of India
Govindpura	None	K. N. Pradhan	Indian National Congress
Bairagarh	None	A. Dass	Bharatiya Jana Sangh
Berasia	None	Laxminarayan Sharma	Bharatiya Jana Sangh
Kurwai	None	K. Kumar	Bharatiya Jana Sangh
Vidisha	None	S. Singh	Bharatiya Jana Sangh
Basoda	SC	H. Pippal	Bharatiya Jana Sangh
Sironj	None	M. Singh	Bharatiya Jana Sangh
Biaora	None	Jagannath	Independent
Narsingarh	None	Krishnamohan	Bharatiya Jana Sangh
Sarangpur	SC	G. Jatav	Bharatiya Jana Sangh
Rajgarh	None	Bijesingh	Indian National Congress
Khilchipur	None	Prabhu Dayal Choube	Indian National Congress
Shujalpur	None	Veerchand	Bharatiya Jana Sangh
Gulana	None	Indarsingh	Bharatiya Jana Sangh
Shajapur	None	Rameshchandra	Bharatiya Jana Sangh
Susner	None	Shivlal	Bharatiya Jana Sangh
Agar	SC	Bhurelal	Bharatiya Jana Sangh
Tarana	None	M. Singh	Bharatiya Jana Sangh
Mahidpur	None	Ramchandra	Bharatiya Jana Sangh
Ujjain North	None	M. Joshi	Bharatiya Jana Sangh
Ujjain South	ST	Gangaram	Bharatiya Jana Sangh
Khacharod	None	Kunwar Veerendra Singh	Bharatiya Jana Sangh
Barnagar	None	K. Mehta	Samyukta Socialist Party
Depalpur	None	B. Sabu	Indian National Congress
Mhow	None	R. C. Jall	Indian National Congress
Indore 1	None	A. B. K. Beg	Samyukta Socialist Party
Indore 2	None	G. Tiwari	Indian National Congress
Indore 3	None	K. Jain	Samyukta Socialist Party
Indore 4	None	Yagya Datt Sharma	Independent
Sawer	SC	B. Kaluji	Bharatiya Jana Sangh
Dewas	None	Hatesingh	Indian National Congress
Sonkatch	SC	Khoobchand	Bharatiya Jana Sangh
Bagli	None	K. Joshi	Bharatiya Jana Sangh
Khategaon	None	N. Kinkar	Bharatiya Jana Sangh
Harsud	None	Kalicharan Sakargayan	Indian National Congress
Nimarkhedi	None	Radhakrishna	Bharatiya Jana Sangh
Pandhana	SC	Phulchand	Bharatiya Jana Sangh
Khandwa	None	Krishnarao	Bharatiya Jana Sangh
Shahpur	None	Babulal	Indian National Congress
Burhanpur	None	Parmanand	Bharatiya Jana Sangh
Bhikangaon	None	A. Bhagwansingh	Indian National Congress
Barwaha	None	A. Mannalal	Indian National Congress
Maheshwar	SC	Sitaram Sadhuram	Indian National Congress
Khargone	None	B. Rakhmaji	Indian National Congress
Dhulkot	ST	G. Bhadsingh	Indian National Congress
Sendhawa	ST	B. Moti	Bharatiya Jana Sangh
Rajpur	ST	Barku Mahadu Chouhan	Indian National Congress
Anjad	None	C. Birdichand	Indian National Congress
Barwani	ST	Daval Nana	Bharatiya Jana Sangh
Manawar	ST	Shivbhanu Solanki	Indian National Congress
Dharampuri	ST	Fatebhansingh Ramsingh	Indian National Congress
Dhar	None	Vasantrao	Bharatiya Jana Sangh
Badnawar	None	Gowardhan	Bharatiya Jana Sangh
Sardarpur	ST	Babusingh	Bharatiya Jana Sangh
Jhabua District
Alirajpur	ST	Chhitusingh	Indian National Congress
Alirajpur	ST	Bhagirath	Sanghata Socialist Party
Jobat	ST	A. Singh	Indian National Congress
Jhabua	ST	B. Singh	Indian National Congress
Thandla	ST	Radusingh	Sanghata Socialist Party
Petlawad	ST	V. Singh	Indian National Congress
Ratlam District
Sailana	ST	Prabhudayal Gehiote	Indian National Congress
Ratlam	None	Devisingh	Indian National Congress
Jaora	None	Bankatelal Todi	Indian National Congress
Alot	SC	Madanlal	Bharatiya Jana Sangh
Mandsaur District
Manasa	None	Nadram Das	Indian National Congress
Garoth	None	Mohanlal	Bharatiya Jana Sangh
Suwasara	SC	Champalal	Bharatiya Jana Sangh
Sitamau	None	Rajendrasingh	Bharatiya Jana Sangh
Mandsaur	None	T. Mohansingh	Bharatiya Jana Sangh
Neemuch	None	Khumansingh	Bharatiya Jana Sangh
Jawad	None	Virendrakumar	Bharatiya Jana Sangh
