= Bargi Assembly constituency =

Constituency of the Madhya Pradesh legislative assembly in India

Coordinates: 22.99°N 79.88°E

Bargi
- Constituency No. 96 for the Madhya Pradesh Legislative Assembly

Constituency details
- Country: India
- Region: Central India
- State: Madhya Pradesh
- District: Jabalpur
- Lok Sabha constituency: Jabalpur
- Established: 1957
- Reservation: None

Member of Legislative Assembly
- 16th Madhya Pradesh Legislative Assembly
- Incumbent Neeraj Singh Lodhi
- Party: Bharatiya Janata Party
- Elected year: 2023
- Preceded by: Sanjay Yadav

Bargi Assembly constituency is one of the 230 Vidhan Sabha (Legislative Assembly) constituencies of Madhya Pradesh state in central India.

It is part of Jabalpur.

== Members of the Legislative Assembly ==
Year	Member	Party
1957	Chandrika Prasad	Indian National Congress
1962	Chandrika Prasad	Indian National Congress
1967	Shivprasad Chanpuria	Janata Party
1972	Nathu Singh	Indian National Congress
1977	Shivprasad Chanpuria	Janata Party
1980	Nanhelal Dhurvey	Indian National Congress (Indira)
1985	Son Singh	Bharatiya Janata Party
1990	Anoop Singh Maravi	Bharatiya Janata Party
1993	Nanhelal Dhurvey	Indian National Congress
1998	Phool Singh Uike	Bharatiya Janata Party
2003	Anup Singh Maravi	Bharatiya Janata Party
2008	Suraj Tiwari	Bharatiya Janata Party
2013	Suraj Tiwari	Bharatiya Janata Party
2018	Sanjay Yadav	Indian National Congress
2023	Neeraj Singh Lodhi	Bharatiya Janata Party

== Election results ==
=== 2023 ===
2023 Madhya Pradesh Legislative Assembly election: Bargi
Party	Candidate	Votes	%	±%
BJP	Neeraj Singh Lodhi	109,506	55.36	+15.36
INC	Sanjay Yadav	69,549	35.16	−14.97
GGP	Mangilal Maravi	8,393	4.24	+2.87
AAP	Anand Singh Lodhi	2,355	1.19	
NOTA	None of the above	1,836	0.93	−0.85
Majority		39,957	20.2	+10.07
Turnout		197,803	81.61	+3.09
BJP gain from INC		Swing		

=== 2018 ===
2018 Madhya Pradesh Legislative Assembly election: Bargi
Party	Candidate	Votes	%	±%
INC	Sanjay Yadav	86,901	50.13	
BJP	Pratibha Singh	69,338	40.0	
Independent	Shanker Singh	3,281	1.89	
GGP	Advocate Siddharth Gupta	2,376	1.37	
BSP	Ram Manohar	1,895	1.09	
Bharatiya Shakti Chetna Party	Aneeta	1,655	0.95	
NOTA	None of the above	3,091	1.78	
Majority		17,563	10.13	
Turnout		173,357	78.52	
INC gain from BJP		Swing		

== See also ==
- Bargi
