= Ratan Singh =

Ratan Singh is an Indian male given name and may refer to:

- Ratnasimha (r. c. 1302-1303 CE), a Guhila ruler of Mewar; known as "Ratan Singh" in vernacular literature
- Ratan Singh II (died 1531), Maharana of Mewar
- Ratan Singh of Amber (died 1548), raja of Amber
- Ratan Singh Rathore, ruler of Ratlam
- Ratan Singh of Bharatpur (r. 1768-1769), a ruler of the Bharatpur princely state
- Ratan Singh Bhangu, Sikh historian, author of the Panth Prakash
- Ratan Singh (Kotma MLA), Indian politician and Member of Madhya Pradesh Legislative Assembly from Kotma constituency
- Ratan Singh (Bharatpur Member of Parliament), Indian National Congress politician from Rajasthan

== See also ==
- Ratan (disambiguation)
- List of people with surname Singh
- Ratna Singh (born 1959), Indian woman politician
- Ratansinh Rathod, Indian politician
- Ratansinh Rajda, member of the parliament of India
