= Dilip Jaiswal (Madhya Pradesh politician) =

Indian politician

Member of Madhya Pradesh Legislative Assembly

Assembly Member for Kotma
- In office 2008–2013
- Preceded by: Jai Singh Maravi
- Constituency: Kotma
- Incumbent
- Assumed office 2023
- Preceded by: Suneel Saraf

Personal details
- Party: Bharatiya Janata Party
- Profession: Politician

Dilip Jaiswal is an Indian politician from Madhya Pradesh. He is a two time elected Member of the Madhya Pradesh Legislative Assembly from 2008 and 2023, representing Kotma Assembly constituency as a Member of the Bharatiya Janata Party.

== See also ==
- List of chief ministers of Madhya Pradesh
- Madhya Pradesh Legislative Assembly
