= Ashta Assembly constituency =

Constituencies of Madhya Pradesh

Coordinates: 23.02°N 76.72°E

Ashta
- Constituency No. 157 for the Madhya Pradesh Legislative Assembly

Constituency details
- Country: India
- Region: Central India
- State: Madhya Pradesh
- District: Sehore
- Lok Sabha constituency: Dewas
- Reservation: SC

Member of Legislative Assembly
- 16th Madhya Pradesh Legislative Assembly
- Incumbent Gopal Singh Engineer
- Party: Bharatiya Janata Party
- Elected year: 2023
- Preceded by: Raghunath Singh Malviya

Ashta is one of the 230 constituencies of the Madhya Pradesh Legislative Assembly in the state of Madhya Pradesh, in central India.

It is part of Sehore district, and Dewas Lok Sabha constituency. As of 2023, its representative is Gopal Singh Engineer of the Bharatiya Janata Party.

== Members of the Legislative Assembly ==
=== Bhopal Legislative Assembly ===
Election	Name	Party
1952	Chandan Mal	Indian National Congress
1952	Gopi Das	Indian National Congress

=== Madhya Pradesh Legislative Assembly ===
Election	Name	Party
1962	Umrao Singh	Indian National Congress
1967	G. Goyal	Bharatiya Jana Sangh
1972	Umrao Singh	Indian National Congress
1977	Narayan Singh Kesri	Janata Party
1980	Devi Lal Rekwal	Bharatiya Janata Party
1985	Ajit Singh	Indian National Congress
1990	Nand Kishor Khatri	Bharatiya Janata Party
1993	Ranjit Singh Gunwan	Bharatiya Janata Party
1998	Ranjit Singh Gunwan	Bharatiya Janata Party
2003	Raghunath Singh Malviya	Bharatiya Janata Party
2008	Ranjeet Singh Gunwan	Bharatiya Janata Party
2013	Ranjeet Singh Gunwan	Bharatiya Janata Party
2018	Raghunath Singh Malviya	Bharatiya Janata Party
2023	Gopal Singh Engineer	Bharatiya Janata Party

== Election results ==
=== 2023 ===
2023 Madhya Pradesh Legislative Assembly election: Ashta
Party	Candidate	Votes	%	±%
BJP	Gopal Singh Engineer	118,750	50.44	+5.7
INC	Kamal Singh Chauhan	110,847	47.08	+5.27
NOTA	None of the above	1,467	0.62	−0.4
Majority		7,903	3.36	+0.43
Turnout		235,425	84.84	+1.86
BJP hold		Swing		

=== 2018 ===
2018 Madhya Pradesh Legislative Assembly election: Ashta
Party	Candidate	Votes	%	±%
BJP	Raghunath Singh Malviya	92,292	44.74	
INC	Gopal Singh Engineer	86,248	41.81	
Prajatantrik Samadhan Party	Kamal Singh Chauhan	17,577	8.52	
BSP	Shailesh Vaidya	4,487	2.18	
NOTA	None of the above	2,108	1.02	
Majority		6,044	2.93	
Turnout		206,286	82.98	
BJP hold		Swing		

== See also ==
- List of constituencies of the Madhya Pradesh Legislative Assembly
- Dewas district
