= Bina Assembly constituency =

Political constituency of Madhya Pradesh State, India

Coordinates: 24.18°N 78.20°E

Bina
- Constituency No. 35 for the Madhya Pradesh Legislative Assembly

Constituency details
- Country: India
- Region: Central India
- State: Madhya Pradesh
- District: Sagar
- Lok Sabha constituency: Sagar
- Established: 1957
- Reservation: SC

Member of Legislative Assembly
- 16th Madhya Pradesh Legislative Assembly
- Incumbent Nirmla Sapre
- Party: Bharatiya Janata Party
- Elected year: 2023
- Preceded by: Mahesh Rai

Bina is one of the 230 Vidhan Sabha (Legislative Assembly) constituencies of Madhya Pradesh state in central India. This constituency is reserved for the candidates belonging to the Scheduled castes since 2008, following the delimitation of the Legislative Assembly constituencies.

== Overview ==
Bina (constituency number 35) is one of the 8 Vidhan Sabha constituencies located in Sagar district. This constituency presently covers Bina Municipality the entire Bina tehsil and part of Khurai tehsil of the district.

Bina is part of Sagar Lok Sabha constituency along with seven other Vidhan Sabha segments, namely, Khurai, Surkhi, Naryoli and Sagar in this district and Kurwai, Sironj and Shamshabad in Vidisha district.

== Members of the Legislative Assembly ==
Election	Name	Party
1962	Bhagirath Bilgaiyan	Bharatiya Jana Sangh
1967	B. K. Pateriya	Indian National Congress
1972	Dalchand Bhagwandas	Indian National Congress
1977	Bhagirath Bilgaiyan	Janata Party
1980	Arvind Bhai	Indian National Congress (Indira)
1985	Sudhakar Bapat	Bharatiya Janata Party
1990	Sudhakar Bapat	Bharatiya Janata Party
1993	Prabhu Singh Thakur	Indian National Congress
1998	Sudhakar Bapat	Bharatiya Janata Party
2003	Sushila Rakesh Sirothiya	Bharatiya Janata Party
2008	Vinod Panthi	Bharatiya Janata Party
2013	Mahesh Rai	Bharatiya Janata Party
2018	Mahesh Rai	Bharatiya Janata Party
2023	Nirmla Sapre	Indian National Congress
2023	Nirmla Sapre	Bharatiya Janata Party

== Election results ==
=== 2023 ===
2023 Madhya Pradesh Legislative Assembly election: Bina
Party	Candidate	Votes	%	±%
INC	Nirmla Sapre	72,458	50.43	+5.09
BJP	Mahesh Rai	66,303	46.15	+0.44
BSP	Ramendra Ahirwar	2,072	1.44	−4.0
NOTA	None of the above	1,239	0.86	−0.35
Majority		6,155	4.28	+3.91
Turnout		143,679	75.36	+1.9
INC gain from BJP		Swing		

=== 2018 ===
2018 Madhya Pradesh Legislative Assembly election: Bina
Party	Candidate	Votes	%	±%
BJP	Mahesh Rai	57,929	45.71	
INC	Shashi Kathoria	57,469	45.34	
BSP	Surendra Kumar Ahirwar	6,896	5.44	
RPI(A)	Dasharath Ahirwar	1,563	1.23	
NOTA	None of the above	1,531	1.21	
Majority		460	0.37	
Turnout		126,744	73.46	
BJP hold		Swing		

== See also ==
- Bina Etawa
