= Bargi, Madhya Pradesh =

Town in Madhya Pradesh, India

Bargi
- city
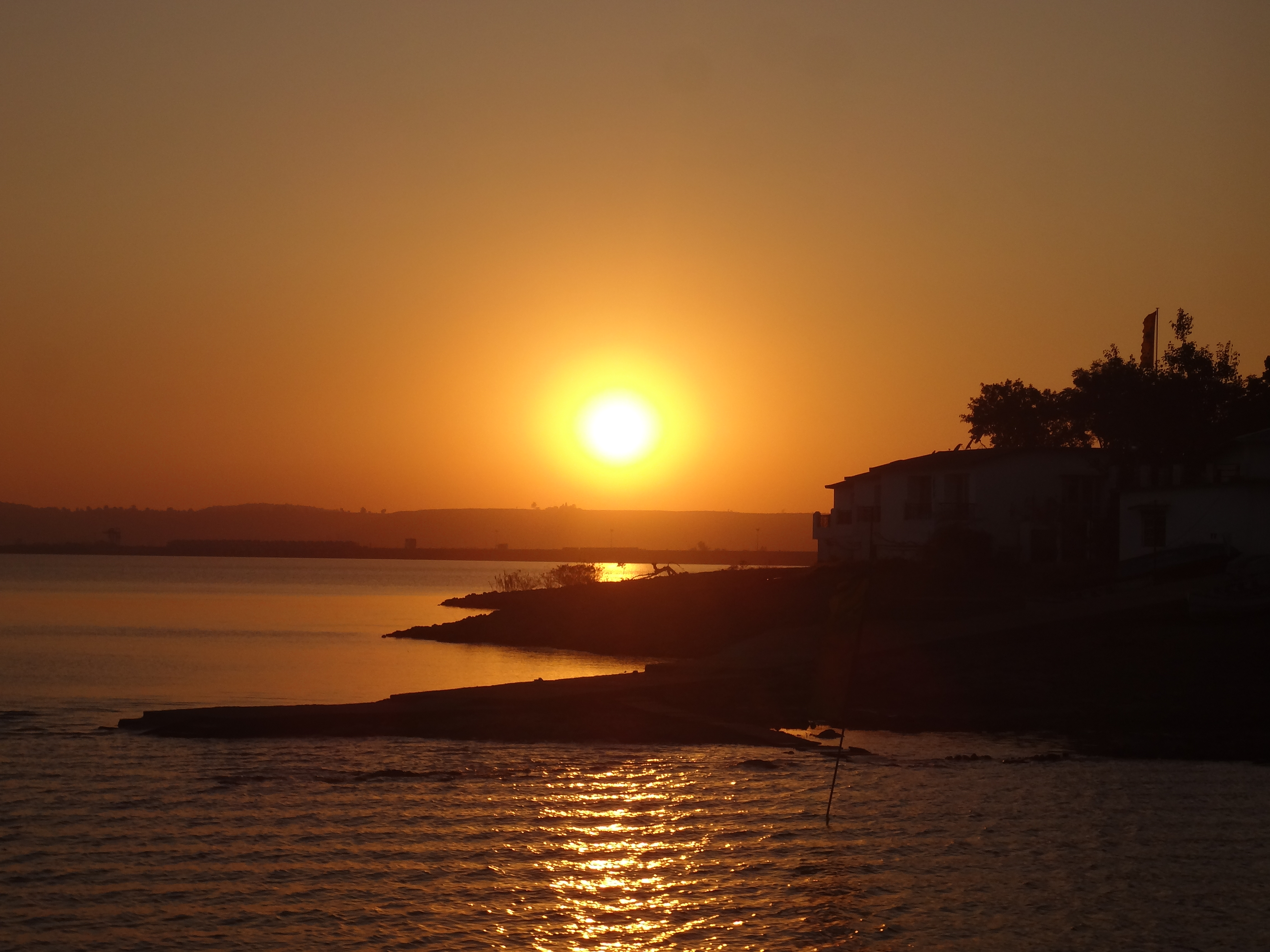
- Sunset at Bargi Resort, Bargi

- Location in Madhya Pradesh, India Bargi (India)
- Coordinates: 22.99°N 79.87°E
- Country: India
- State: Madhya Pradesh
- District: Jabalpur

Government
  - Type: Gram Panchayat

Population (2011)
  - Total: 6,916

Languages
  - Official: Hindi
- Time zone: UTC+5:30 (IST)
- ISO 3166 code: IN-MP
- Vehicle registration: MP 20

Bargi is a census town in the district of Jabalpur, Madhya Pradesh, India. The pin code for Bargi is 482051, and it is located 25 km from Jabalpur.

== Geography ==
Bargi is located at the coordinates 22.9901586, 79.8758780, near the Narmada River.

== Demographics ==
According to the 2011 Census of India, Bargi town has a population of 6,916, with 3,621 males and 3,295 females.

== Government ==
Bargi Assembly constituency is one of the 230 Vidhan Sabha (Legislative Assembly) constituencies in the state of Madhya Pradesh, central India.

== Transportation ==
Bargi town is well-connected by road and rail.

Bargi Railway Station is situated on the Jabalpur - Gondia line and serves as a stop for several passenger and express trains, enhancing connectivity to the region.

Bargi is well-connected by road, with National Highway 34 passing through the town. This highway connects Jabalpur to Seoni.
