= Hariraj Kunwar =

Indian politician

Hariraj Kunwar was an Indian politician from the state of the Madhya Pradesh. He represented Kotma Vidhan Sabha constituency in the Madhya Pradesh Legislative Assembly by winning the seat in the General election of 1957.
