= Kotma Assembly constituency =

Constituency of the Madhya Pradesh legislative assembly in India

Coordinates: 23.27°N 82.13°E

Kotma
- Constituency No. 86 for the Madhya Pradesh Legislative Assembly

Constituency details
- Country: India
- Region: Central India
- State: Madhya Pradesh
- District: Anuppur
- Lok Sabha constituency: Shahdol
- Established: 1957
- Reservation: None

Member of Legislative Assembly
- 16th Madhya Pradesh Legislative Assembly
- Incumbent Dilip Jaiswal
- Party: Bharatiya Janata Party
- Elected year: 2023
- Preceded by: Suneel Saraf

Kotma is one of the 230 Legislative Assembly constituencies of Madhya Pradesh state in central India.

It is in Anuppur district.

== Members of the Legislative Assembly ==
Year	Member	Party
1957	Hariraj Kunwar	Indian National Congress
1957	Ratan Singh	Indian National Congress
1962	Girja Kumari	Indian National Congress
1967	K. M. Singh	Indian National Congress
1972	Mrigendra Singh	Indian National Congress
1977	Babulal Singh	Janata Party
1980	Bhagwandin Gond	Indian National Congress (Indira)
1985	Bhagwandin Gond	Indian National Congress
1990	Chhote Lal	Bharatiya Janata Party
1993	Rajesh Nandani Singh	Indian National Congress
1998	Jaisingh Maravi	Bharatiya Janata Party
2003	Jaisingh Maravi	Bharatiya Janata Party
2008	Dilip Jaiswal	Bharatiya Janata Party
2013	Manoj Kumar Agrawal	Indian National Congress
2018	Suneel Saraf	Indian National Congress
2023	Dilip Jaiswal	Bharatiya Janata Party

== Election results ==
=== 2023 ===
2023 Madhya Pradesh Legislative Assembly election: Kotma
Party	Candidate	Votes	%	±%
BJP	Dilip Jaiswal	65,818	55.48	+22.0
INC	Suneel Saraf	43,030	36.27	−7.6
GGP	Seema Kewat	2,977	2.51	−2.73
NOTA	None of the above	1,486	1.25	+0.8
Majority		22,788	19.21	+8.82
Turnout		118,630	78.84	+5.51
BJP gain from INC		Swing		

=== 2018 ===
2018 Madhya Pradesh Legislative Assembly election: Kotma
Party	Candidate	Votes	%	±%
INC	Suneel Saraf	48,249	43.87	
BJP	Dilip Kumar Jaiswal	36,820	33.48	
GGP	Ramkhelawn Tiwari	5,766	5.24	
CPI	Santosh Kumar Kewat	5,044	4.59	
Sapaks Party	Kishori Lal Chaturvedi	4,392	3.99	
BSP	Sudhir Pandey	2,419	2.2	
Independent	Nirmla Prajapati	1,348	1.23	
NOTA	None of the above	491	0.45	
Majority		11,429	10.39	
Turnout		109,975	73.33	
INC hold		Swing		

=== 2013 ===
2013 Madhya Pradesh Legislative Assembly election: Kotma
Party	Candidate	Votes	%	±%
INC	Manoj Kumar Agrawal	38,319	36.87	
BJP	Rajesh Soni	36773	35.38	
BSP	Khurshid Ahmed	7202	2.58	6.93
GGP	Pushpendra Singh Gaharwar	5454	5.25	N/A
Independent	Sahasram	4398	4.23	
CPI	Haridwar Singh	4296	4.13	
Independent	Narvda Singh	1070	1.03	
Independent	Saket Kumar	907	0.87	
NCP	Ram Khelawan Tiwari	865	0.83	
LJP	Manoj Verma Kushwaha	648	0.62	
RSP	Budha Sen Rathour	502	0.48	
SS	Brajendra Kumar Mishra	494	0.48	
Independent	Arvind Gupta	457	0.44	
Independent	Abhilash Tripathi	443	0.43	
BSCP	Saurabh Kumar Dwivedi	396	0.38	
NOTA	None of the Above	1704	1.64	
Majority				
Turnout		103928	72.80	
Swing to INC from BJP		Swing		

== See also ==
- Kotma
