= Pandhana Assembly constituency =

Constituency of the Madhya Pradesh legislative assembly in India

Coordinates: 21.70°N 76.22°E

Pandhana
- Constituency No. 178 for the Madhya Pradesh Legislative Assembly

Constituency details
- Country: India
- Region: Central India
- State: Madhya Pradesh
- District: Khandwa
- Lok Sabha constituency: Khandwa
- Established: 1972
- Reservation: ST

Member of Legislative Assembly
- 16th Madhya Pradesh Legislative Assembly
- Incumbent Chaya More
- Party: Bharatiya Janata Party
- Elected year: 2023
- Preceded by: Ram Dangore

Pandhana is one of the 230 Vidhan Sabha (Legislative Assembly) constituencies of Madhya Pradesh state in central India.

It is part of Khandwa district. The constituency was originally reserved for Scheduled Castes, and was reserved by Scheduled Tribes in 2008.

== Members of the Legislative Assembly ==
Election	Name	Party
1962	Deokaran	Indian National Congress
1967	Phulchand	Bharatiya Jana Sangh
1972	Sakharam Deokaran Patel	Bharatiya Jana Sangh
1977	Sakharam Deokaran Patel	Janata Party
1980	Sakharam Deokaran Patel	Bharatiya Janata Party
1985	Hiralal Silawat	Indian National Congress
1990	Kishori Lal Verma	Bharatiya Janata Party
1993	Kishori Lal Verma	Bharatiya Janata Party
1998	Hiralal Silawat	Indian National Congress
2003	Kishori Lal Verma	Bharatiya Janata Party
2008	Anar Bhai Waskle	Bharatiya Janata Party
2013	Yogita Navalsing Borker	Bharatiya Janata Party
2018	Ram Dangore	Bharatiya Janata Party
2023	Chaya More	Bharatiya Janata Party

== Election results ==
=== 2023 ===
2023 Madhya Pradesh Legislative Assembly election: Pandhana
Party	Candidate	Votes	%	±%
BJP	Chaya More	123,332	54.78	▲8.61
INC	Rupali Nandu Bare	94,516	41.98	▲7.75
NOTA	None of the above	2,590	1.15	▼1.6
Majority		28,816	12.8	▲0.86
Turnout		225,152	79.8	▼0.81
BJP hold		Swing		

=== 2018 ===
2018 Madhya Pradesh Legislative Assembly election: Pandhana
Party	Candidate	Votes	%	±%
BJP	Ram Dangore	91,844	46.17	
INC	Chaya More	68,094	34.23	
Independent	Rupali Nandu Bare	25,456	12.8	
Independent	Prem Dodwe	2,591	1.3	
BSP	Bahadur Singh Davar	1,988	1.0	
NOTA	None of the above	5,477	2.75	
Majority		23,750	11.94	
Turnout		198,939	80.61	
BJP hold		Swing		

=== 2013 ===
2013 Madhya Pradesh Legislative Assembly election: Pandhana
Party	Candidate	Votes	%	±%
BJP	Yogita Navalsing Borker (Bhabhi)	89,732	52.27	
INC	Nandu Bare	72,471	42.21	
NOTA	None of the Above	5,349	3.12	
BSP	Shankar More	4,124	2.41	
Majority		17,261	10.38	
Turnout		1,71,738	75.07	
BJP hold		Swing		

== See also ==
- Pandhana
