= Bhainsdehi Assembly constituency =

Constituency of the Madhya Pradesh legislative assembly in India

Coordinates: 21.64°N 77.63°E

Bhainsdehi
- Constituency No. 133 for the Madhya Pradesh Legislative Assembly

Constituency details
- Country: India
- Region: Central India
- State: Madhya Pradesh
- District: Betul
- Lok Sabha constituency: Betul
- Established: 1952
- Reservation: ST

Member of Legislative Assembly
- 16th Madhya Pradesh Legislative Assembly
- Incumbent Mahendra Singh Chouhan
- Party: Bharatiya Janata Party
- Elected year: 2023
- Preceded by: Dharmu Singh Sirsam

Bhainsdehi is one of the 230 Vidhan Sabha (Legislative Assembly) constituencies of Madhya Pradesh state in central India.

It is part of Betul District.

== Members of the Legislative Assembly ==
Election	Name	Party
1952	Anandrao Lokhande	Indian National Congress
1957	Somdatta Deo	Indian National Congress
1962	Daddusingh Balaji	Jana Sangh
1967	Daddusingh Balaji	Bharatiya Jana Sangh
1972	Kalyasingh Balaji	Indian National Congress
1977	Patiram	Janata Party
1980	Keshar Singh Chauhan	Bharatiya Janata Party
1985	Satish Kumar Chauhan	Indian National Congress
1990	Keshar Singh Chauhan	Bharatiya Janata Party
1993	Ganjan Singh Suratsingh Kumre	Indian National Congress
1998	Mahendra Singh Chouhan	Bharatiya Janata Party
2003	Mahendra Singh Chouhan	Bharatiya Janata Party
2008	Dharmu Singh Sirsam	Indian National Congress
2013	Mahendra Singh Chouhan	Bharatiya Janata Party
2018	Dharmu Singh Sirsam	Indian National Congress
2023	Mahendra Singh Chouhan	Bharatiya Janata Party

== Election results ==
=== 2023 ===
2023 Madhya Pradesh Legislative Assembly election: Bhainsdehi
Party	Candidate	Votes	%	±%
BJP	Mahendra Singh Chouhan	97,938	43.84	+7.12
INC	Dharmu Singh Sirsam	89,708	40.15	−11.95
Independent	Sandeep Dhurve	10,478	4.69	
PHJSP	Rahul Satish Chauhan	9,603	4.3	
Independent	Hemraj Baraskar	5,236	2.34	
GGP	Annulal Dada	2,248	1.01	−1.83
Independent	Chaitram Kasdekar	2,126	0.95	
NOTA	None of the above	5,131	2.3	−1.66
Majority		8,230	3.69	−11.69
Turnout		223,410	84.92	+0.31
BJP gain from INC		Swing		

=== 2018 ===
2018 Madhya Pradesh Legislative Assembly election: Bhainsdehi
Party	Candidate	Votes	%	±%
INC	Dharmu Singh Sirsam	104,592	52.1	
BJP	Mahendra Singh Chouhan	73,712	36.72	
GGP	Sevaram Ewaney	5,693	2.84	
BSP	Narbadi Uikey	3,128	1.56	
BMP	Rangilal Meshram	2,410	1.2	
Independent	Yogendra Singh Chouhan	1,951	0.97	
NOTA	None of the above	7,948	3.96	
Majority		30,880	15.38	
Turnout		200,749	84.61	
INC hold		Swing		

== See also ==
- Bhainsdehi
