= Bhaiyalal Rajwade =

Indian politician (born 1949)

Minister of Sports Government of Chhattisgarh
- In office 22 May 2015 – 11 December 2018
- Chief Minister: Dr. Raman Singh
- Succeeded by: Umesh Patel

Minister of Labour Government of Chhattisgarh
- In office 22 May 2015 – 11 December 2018
- Preceded by: Amar Agrawal

Member of Chhattisgarh Legislative Assembly
- Incumbent
- Assumed office 3 December 2023
- Preceded by: Ambica Singh Deo
- In office 2008–2018
- Preceded by: Ramchandra Singh Deo
- Succeeded by: Ambica Singh Deo
- Constituency: Baikunthpur

Personal details
- Born: 25 January 1949 (age 77)
- Party: Bharatiya Janata Party

Bhaiyalal Rajwade (born 25 January 1949) is an Indian politician who is a Bharatiya Janata Party Member of the Legislative Assembly from the Baikunthpur Vidhan Sabha constituency in the Legislative Assembly of Chhattisgarh in India.

== Political career ==
In the 2013 Chhattisgarh Legislative Assembly election, Rajwade defeated Indian National Congress candidate Bedanti Tivari. Rajwade had defeated Tivari in the 2008 Chhattisgarh Legislative Assembly election as well. In the Chhattisgarh Legislative Assembly election, 2003, he had lost to Congress candidate Ambica Singh Deo.
