= Gopal Singh Engineer =

Indian politician

Member of the Madhya Pradesh Legislative Assembly
- Incumbent
- Assumed office 2023
- Preceded by: Raghunath Singh Malviya
- Constituency: Ashta

Personal details
- Party: Bharatiya Janata Party
- Profession: Politician

Gopal Singh Engineer (born 1966) is an Indian politician from Madhya Pradesh. He became a member of the Madhya Pradesh Legislative Assembly winning the 2023 Madhya Pradesh Legislative Assembly election representing the Bharatiya Janata Party from Ashta Assembly constituency which is reserved for Scheduled Caste community in Sehore District.

== Early life and career ==
Engineer is from Ashta, Sehore District, Madhya Pradesh. He is the son of Uday Singh. He completed his bachelors in architecture in 1992 at Molana Azad College, Bhopal University.

== Career ==
Engineer won the 2023 Madhya Pradesh Legislative Assembly election representing the Bharatiya Janata Party. He polled 118,750 votes and defeated his nearest rival, Kamal Singh Chauhan of the Indian National Congress, by a margin of 7,903 votes. Earlier, he lost the 2018 and 2013 Assembly elections as a Congress candidate.

== See also ==
- List of chief ministers of Madhya Pradesh
- Madhya Pradesh Legislative Assembly
