= Nirmla Sapre =

Indian politician

Member of the 16th Madhya Pradesh Assembly
- Incumbent
- Assumed office December 2023
- Preceded by: Mahesh Rai
- Constituency: Bina

Personal details
- Born: 1977 (age 48–49)
- Party: Bhartiya Janta Party
- Education: Master of Science
- Alma mater: Vinayaka Mission's Research Foundation
- Occupation: Politician

Nirmla Sapre (born 1977) is an Indian politician from Madhya Pradesh. She is a member of the Madhya Pradesh Legislative Assembly representing the Indian National Congress Party from Bina Assembly constituency which is reserved from Scheduled Caste community in Sagar district. She won the 2023 Madhya Pradesh Legislative Assembly election.

== Early life and education ==
Sapre hails from an agricultural family in Bina, Sagar district, Madhya Pradesh. She completed her master's degree in zoology from Vinayaka Mission University, Selam, Tamil Nadu, and also did an M.Sc. from Dr. Hari Singh Gour University in Sagar.

== Career ==
Sapre was elected as an MLA for the first time winning the 2023 Madhya Pradesh Legislative Assembly election representing Indian National Congress from Bina Assembly constituency in Sagar district. She polled 72,458 votes and defeated her nearest rival, Mahesh Rai of the Bharatiya Janata Party, by a margin of 6,155 votes.

=== Controversy ===
Later, she joined the Bharatiya Janata Party on 6 May 2024. However, she did not resign from the state assembly. On 5 July 2024, the Congress party Leader of the Opposition, Umang Singhar filed a petition seeking the disqualification of Sapre to the speaker Narendra Singh Tomar, under the anti defection law. Later, Madhya Pradesh High Court issued notices to both Sapre and speaker Tomar on 9 December 2024, seeking clarification on the delay in deciding Sapre's legislative membership.
