= Mahendra Singh Chouhan =

Indian politician

Member of Madhya Pradesh Legislative Assembly
- In office 2013–2018
- Preceded by: Dharmu Singh Sirsam
- Constituency: Bhainsdehi
- Incumbent
- Assumed office 2023
- Constituency: Bhainsdehi

Personal details
- Party: Bharatiya Janata Party
- Profession: Politician

Mahendra Singh Chouhan is an Indian politician from Madhya Pradesh. He is a two time Member of the Madhya Pradesh Legislative Assembly from 2013 and 2023, representing Bhainsdehi Assembly constituency as a Member of the Bharatiya Janata Party.

== See also ==
- List of chief ministers of Madhya Pradesh
- Madhya Pradesh Legislative Assembly
