= Raghubar Singh =

Indian politician

Member of the Madhya Pradesh Legislative Assembly
- In office 1957–1962
- Succeeded by: Ratti Ram
- Constituency: Manendragarh

Raghubar Singh was an Indian politician from the state of the Madhya Pradesh. He represented Manendragarh Vidhan Sabha constituency of undivided Madhya Pradesh Legislative Assembly by winning General election of 1957.
