= Manendragarh Assembly constituency =

Legislative Assembly constituency in Chhattisgarh State, India

Coordinates: 23.21°N 82.19°E

Manendragarh
- Constituency No. 2 for the Chhattisgarh Legislative Assembly

Constituency details
- Country: India
- Region: Central India
- State: Chhattisgarh
- Division: Surguja
- District: Koriya
- Lok Sabha constituency: Korba
- Established: 1957
- Total electors: 134,947
- Reservation: None

Member of Legislative Assembly
- 6th Chhattisgarh Legislative Assembly
- Incumbent Shyam Bihari Jaiswal
- Party: Bharatiya Janata Party
- Elected year: 2023
- Preceded by: Vinay Jaiswal

Manendragarh is one of the 90 Legislative Assembly constituencies of Chhattisgarh state in India.

It is part of Koriya district.

== Members of the Legislative Assembly ==
Year	Member	Party
Madhya Pradesh Legislative Assembly
1952	Jwalaprasad	Independent politician
1952	Pritam Kurrey	Indian National Congress
1957	Brijendra Lal	Indian National Congress
1957	Raghubar Singh	Indian National Congress
1962	Ratti Ram	Indian National Congress
1967	Dharam Pal	Indian National Congress
1972	Dharam Pal	Indian National Congress
1977	Ram Singh	Janata Party
1980	Vijay Singh	Indian National Congress
1985	Vijay Singh	Indian National Congress
1990	Chandrapratap Singh	Bharatiya Janata Party
1993	Lal Vijai Pratap Singh	Indian National Congress
1998	Gulab Singh	Indian National Congress
Chhattisgarh Legislative Assembly
2003	Gulab Singh	Indian National Congress
2008	Deepak Kumar Patel	Bharatiya Janata Party
2013	Shyam Bihari Jaiswal	Bharatiya Janata Party
2018	Vinay Jaiswal	Indian National Congress
2023	Shyam Bihari Jaiswal	Bharatiya Janata Party

== Election results ==
=== 2023 ===
Chhattisgarh Legislative Assembly Election, 2023: Manendragarh
Party	Candidate	Votes	%	±%
BJP	Shyam Bihari Jaiswal	48,503	48.19	+15.87
INC	Ramesh Singh Vakil	36,623	36.39	−0.14
GGP	Sekh Ismail	10,411	10.34	−1.65
JCC	Aditya Raj David	1,519	1.51	−11.56
NOTA	None of the Above	1,308	1.30	−0.91
Majority		11,880	11.81	+7.60
Turnout		100,654	74.59	+2.11
BJP gain from INC		Swing		

=== 2018 ===
Chhattisgarh Legislative Assembly Election, 2018: Manendragarh
Party	Candidate	Votes	%	±%
INC	Dr. Vinay Jaiswal	34,803	36.53	
BJP	Shyam Bihari Jaiswal	30,792	32.32	
JCC	Lakhan Lal Shrivastava	12,452	13.07	
GGP	Aditya Raj David	11,425	11.99	
NOTA	None of the Above	2,106	2.21	
Majority		4,011	4.21	
Turnout		95,260	72.48	
INC gain from BJP		Swing		

== See also ==
- List of constituencies of the Chhattisgarh Legislative Assembly
- Koriya district
