= Chaya More =

Indian politician

Chaya More (born 1977) is an Indian politician from Madhya Pradesh. She is a member of the Madhya Pradesh Legislative Assembly representing the Bharatiya Janata Party from Pandhana Assembly constituency, which is reserved for ST community, in Khandwa district. She won the 2023 Madhya Pradesh Legislative Assembly election.

== Early life and education ==
More is from an agricultural family in Bhikangaon village, Khargone district, Madhya Pradesh. She married Govind More. She completed her graduation in arts from Bhopal Bhoj Open University 2017. Earlier, she did her plus-two from Madhya Pradesh Rajya Open School, Bhopal.

== Career ==
More was first elected as an MLA in the 2023 Madhya Pradesh Legislative Assembly election from the Pandhana Assembly Constituency, an ST reserved seat, representing the Bharatiya Janata Party. After she was denied a ticket by the Indian National Congress Party, she joined the BJP which nominated her to contest from Pandhana seat. She polled 123,332 votes and defeated her nearest rival, Rupali Nandu Bare of the Indian National Congress by a margin of 28,816 votes. Earlier, she lost the 2018 Madhya Pradesh Legislative Assembly election as Indian National Congress candidate from Pandhana seat to Ram Dangore of the Bharatiya Janata Party by a margin of 23,750.

In January 2025, she attended a series of Republic Day programmes and in the afternoon while attending another programme at a school, she fell ill and was admitted in the Khandwa District Hospital.
