= Baikunthpur, Chhattisgarh Assembly constituency =

Legislative Assembly constituency in Chhattisgarh State, India

Coordinates: 23.28°N 82.56°E

Baikunthpur
- Constituency No. 3 for the Chhattisgarh Legislative Assembly

Constituency details
- Country: India
- Region: Central India
- State: Chhattisgarh
- Division: Surguja
- District: Koriya
- Lok Sabha constituency: Korba
- Established: 1961
- Total electors: 168,185
- Reservation: None

Member of Legislative Assembly
- 6th Chhattisgarh Legislative Assembly
- Incumbent Bhaiyalal Rajwade
- Party: Bharatiya Janata Party
- Elected year: 2023
- Preceded by: Ambika Singh Deo

Baikunthpur is one of the 90 Legislative Assembly constituencies of Chhattisgarh state in India. It is in Koriya district and is a part of the Korba Lok Sabha constituency.

== Members of the Legislative Assembly ==
Year	Member	Party
Madhya Pradesh Legislative Assembly
Until 1962: Constituency did not exist
1962	Jwala Prasad	Praja Socialist Party
1967	Ramchandra Singh Deo	Indian National Congress
1972	Ramchandra Singh Deo	Indian National Congress
1977	Jwala Prasad	Janata Party
1980	Devender Kumari	Indian National Congress
1985	Dwarika Prasad	Bharatiya Janata Party
1990	Ramchandra Singh Deo	Indian National Congress
1993	Ramchandra Singh Deo	Indian National Congress
1998	Ramchandra Singh Deo	Indian National Congress
Chhattisgarh Legislative Assembly
2003	Ramchandra Singh Deo	Indian National Congress
2008	Bhaiyalal Rajwade	Bharatiya Janata Party
2013	Bhaiyalal Rajwade	Bharatiya Janata Party
2018	Ambika Singh Deo	Indian National Congress
2023	Bhaiyalal Rajwade	Bharatiya Janata Party

== Election results ==
=== Assembly Election 2023 ===
2023 Chhattisgarh Legislative Assembly election : Baikunthpur
Party	Candidate	Votes	%	±%
BJP	Bhaiyalal Rajwade	66,866	48.89%	▲14.58
INC	Ambica Singh Deo	41,453	30.31%	▼8.21
GGP	Sanjay Singh Kamro	23,288	17.03%	▲1.07
NOTA	None of the Above	1,934	1.41%	▼0.66
AAP	Dr. Akash Kumar	1,872	1.37%	▲0.18
Bhartiya Shakti Chetna Party	Mejor Prasad Yadav	1,426	1.04%	New
Margin of victory		25,413	18.58%	▲14.37
Turnout		1,36,772	82.50%	▲1.83
Registered electors		1,68,185		▲5.34
BJP gain from INC		Swing	▲10.37	

=== Assembly Election 2018 ===
2018 Chhattisgarh Legislative Assembly election : Baikunthpur
Party	Candidate	Votes	%	±%
INC	Ambica Singh Deo	48,885	38.52%	▼1.07
BJP	Bhaiyalal Rajwade	43,546	34.31%	▼6.23
GGP	Sanjay Singh Kamro	20,247	15.95%	▲0.43
JCC	Bihari Lal Rajwade	9,236	7.28%	New
NOTA	None of the Above	2,630	2.07%	▼0.84
AAP	Sunil Singh	1,504	1.19%	New
Independent	Ram Narayan Sahu	1,171	0.92%	New
Margin of victory		5,339	4.21%	▲3.25
Turnout		1,26,919	81.22%	▲1.96
Registered electors		1,59,656		▲10.37
INC gain from BJP		Swing	▼2.02	

=== Assembly Election 2013 ===
2013 Chhattisgarh Legislative Assembly election : Baikunthpur
Party	Candidate	Votes	%	±%
BJP	Bhaiyalal Rajwade	45,471	40.54%	▲1.14
INC	Bedanti Tivari	44,402	39.59%	▲6.21
GGP	Sanjay Singh Kamro	17,413	15.52%	▲5.27
NOTA	None of the Above	3,265	2.91%	New
BSP	Mani Lal Rajwade	2,536	2.26%	▼3.36
Rashtriya Gondvana Party	Chintamani Sandil	1,441	1.28%	New
Chattisgarh Swabhiman Manch	Ramnarayan Sahu	899	0.80%	New
Margin of victory		1,069	0.95%	▼5.07
Turnout		1,12,162	79.80%	▲8.61
Registered electors		1,44,656		▲8.48
BJP hold		Swing	▲1.14	

=== Assembly Election 2008 ===
2008 Chhattisgarh Legislative Assembly election : Baikunthpur
Party	Candidate	Votes	%	±%
BJP	Bhaiyalal Rajwade	36,215	39.40%	▲4.02
INC	Bedanti Tiwari	30,679	33.38%	▼8.54
GGP	Ramdular Singh Aayam	9,428	10.26%	▲5.59
BSP	Man Sai	5,165	5.62%	▲2.47
Independent	Gyan Prasad Khushwaha	3,077	3.35%	New
RJD	Pandit Anil Maharaj	2,024	2.20%	New
Independent	Manoj Kumar Sirdar	1,169	1.27%	New
Margin of victory		5,536	6.02%	▼0.51
Turnout		91,909	68.97%	▼0.51
Registered electors		1,33,352		▼24.05
BJP gain from INC		Swing	▼2.52	

=== Assembly Election 2003 ===
2003 Chhattisgarh Legislative Assembly election : Baikunthpur
Party	Candidate	Votes	%	±%
INC	Dr. Ramchandra Singh Deo	51,107	41.92%	New
BJP	Bhaiyalal Rajwade	43,137	35.39%	New
NCP	Prakash Tiwari	10,319	8.46%	New
GGP	Kamleshwar Prasad	5,694	4.67%	New
BSP	D L Bhaskar	3,844	3.15%	New
Independent	Hira Lal Sahu	2,763	2.27%	New
CPI(M)	Balbhadra Pandey	1,703	1.40%	New
Margin of victory		7,970	6.54%	
Turnout		1,21,903	69.45%	
Registered electors		1,75,583		
INC win (new seat)				

== See also ==
- List of constituencies of the Chhattisgarh Legislative Assembly
- Koriya district
