= Baloda Bazar Assembly constituency =

Legislative Assembly constituency in Chhattisgarh State, India

Coordinates: 21.66°N 82.15°E

Baloda Bazar
- Constituency No. 45 for the Chhattisgarh Legislative Assembly

Constituency details
- Country: India
- Region: Central India
- State: Chhattisgarh
- District: Baloda Bazar
- Lok Sabha constituency: Raipur
- Established: 1957
- Total electors: 280,782
- Reservation: None

Member of Legislative Assembly
- 6th Chhattisgarh Legislative Assembly
- Incumbent Tank Ram Verma
- Party: Bharatiya Janata Party
- Elected year: 2023
- Preceded by: Pramod Kumar Sharma

Baloda Bazar is one of the 90 Legislative Assembly constituencies of Chhattisgarh state in India. It is in Baloda Bazar district.

== Members of the Legislative Assembly ==
Year	Member	Party
Madhya Pradesh Legislative Assembly
1957	Brijlal	Praja Socialist Party
1957	Naindas	Indian National Congress
1962	Manohar Das	Indian National Congress
1967	B. Verma	Indian National Congress
1972	Dolatram Ramdayal	Indian National Congress
1977	Vansraj Mahabir Prasad	Janata Party
1980	Ganeshshankar	Indian National Congress
1985	Narendra Mishra	Indian National Congress
1990	Satyanarayan Kesharwani	Bharatiya Janata Party
1993	Karuna Shukla	Bharatiya Janata Party
1998	Ganesh Shankar	Indian National Congress
Chhattisgarh Legislative Assembly
2003	Ganesh Shankar Bajpai	Indian National Congress
2008	Laxmi Baghel	Bharatiya Janata Party
2013	Janak Ram Verma	Indian National Congress
2018	Pramod Kumar Sharma	Janta Congress Chhattisgarh
2023	Tank Ram Verma	Bharatiya Janata Party

== Election results ==
=== 2023 ===
Chhattisgarh Legislative Assembly Election, 2023: Baloda Bazar
Party	Candidate	Votes	%	±%
BJP	Tank Ram Verma	108,381	49.34	+24.40
INC	Shailesh Nitin Trivedi	93,635	42.63	+10.37
BSP	Rajkumar Patre	9,719	4.42	
NOTA	None of the Above	2,610	1.19	−0.43
Majority		14,746	6.71	+5.63
Turnout		219,644	78.23	+2.11
BJP gain from JCC		Swing		

=== 2018 ===
Chhattisgarh Legislative Assembly Election, 2018: Baloda Bazar
Party	Candidate	Votes	%	±%
JCC	Pramod Kumar Sharma	65,251	33.34	
INC	Janak Ram Verma	63,122	32.26	
BJP	Tesu Lal Dhurandhar	48,808	24.94	
Independent	Ganesh Kumar Agrawal	3,093	1.58	
Independent	Ganga Ram Sher	3,079	1.57	
NOTA	None of the Above	3,167	1.62	
Majority		2,129	1.08	
Turnout		195,692	76.12	
JCC gain from INC		Swing		

== See also ==
- List of constituencies of the Chhattisgarh Legislative Assembly
- Baloda Bazar district
