= Bhikangaon Assembly constituency =

Legislative Assembly constituency in Madhya Pradesh, India

Coordinates: 21.87°N 75.96°E

Bhikangaon
- Constituency No. 181 for the Madhya Pradesh Legislative Assembly

Constituency details
- Country: India
- Region: Central India
- State: Madhya Pradesh
- District: Khargone
- Lok Sabha constituency: Khandwa
- Established: 1972
- Reservation: ST

Member of Legislative Assembly
- 16th Madhya Pradesh Legislative Assembly
- Incumbent Jhuma Solanki
- Party: Indian National Congress
- Elected year: 2023
- Preceded by: Dhool Singh Dawar

Bhikangaon Assembly constituency is one of the 230 Vidhan Sabha (Legislative Assembly) constituencies of Madhya Pradesh state in central India.

It is part of Khargone District.

== Members of the Legislative Assembly ==
Election	Member	Party
1962	Hiralal Yadav	Jana Sangh
1967	A. Bhagwansingh	Indian National Congress
1972	Rana Balbahadur Singh	Indian National Congress
1977	Dongar Singh Patel	Janata Party
1980	Dongar Singh Patel	Bharatiya Janata Party
1985	Jawan Singh	Indian National Congress
1990	Dongar Singh Patel	Bharatiya Janata Party
1993	Jawan Singh	Indian National Congress
1998	Lal Singh Patel	Bharatiya Janata Party
2003	Dhool Singh Dawar	Bharatiya Janata Party
2008	Dhool Singh Dawar	Bharatiya Janata Party
2013	Jhuma Solanki	Indian National Congress
2018	Jhuma Solanki	Indian National Congress
2023	Jhuma Solanki	Indian National Congress

== Election results ==
=== 2023 ===
2023 Madhya Pradesh Legislative Assembly election: Bhikangaon
Party	Candidate	Votes	%	±%
INC	Jhuma Solanki	92,135	47.47	▼7.92
BJP	Nanda Brahmane	91,532	47.16	▲8.24
Independent	Mohan Singh Patel	2,735	1.41	
BAP	Ashvin Dhupe	2,526	1.3	
BSP	Javansingh Suklal More	2,048	1.06	▲0.24
NOTA	None of the above	1,799	0.93	▼1.42
Majority		603	0.31	▼16.16
Turnout		194,076	77.98	▲0.59
INC hold		Swing		

=== 2018 ===
2018 Madhya Pradesh Legislative Assembly election: Bhikangaon
Party	Candidate	Votes	%	±%
INC	Jhuma Solanki	91,635	55.39	
BJP	Dhool Singh Dawar	64,378	38.92	
Independent	Rajendra Tukaram	2,275	1.38	
NOTA	None of the above	3,885	2.35	
Majority		27,257	16.47	
Turnout		165,429	77.39	
INC hold		Swing		

=== 2013 ===
2013 Madhya Pradesh Legislative Assembly election: Bhikangaon
Party	Candidate	Votes	%	±%
INC	Jhuma Solanki	72,060	47.39	
BJP	Nanda Brahamne	69,661	45.81	
NCP	Khajan Chouhan	3,338	2.20	
BSP	D.R. Barde	3,279	2.16	N/A
NOTA	None of the Above	3,719	2.45	
Majority		2,399	1.62	
Turnout		1,52,106	75.13	
INC gain from BJP		Swing		
