= Manoj Kumar Agrawal =

Indian politician

Member of the Madhya Pradesh Legislative Assembly
- In office 2013–2018
- Preceded by: Dilip Jaisawal
- Succeeded by: Suneel Saraf
- Constituency: Kotma

Personal details
- Born: 3 May 1963 (age 62)
- Citizenship: India
- Party: Indian National Congress
- Spouse: Archana Agrawal
- Education: Graduate in Comm.
- Profession: Politician

Manoj Kumar Agrawal is an Indian politician and a member of the Indian National Congress party.

== Political career ==
He became an MLA in 2013.

== Political views ==
He supports Congress Party's Ideology.

== Personal life ==
He is married to Archana Agrawal.

== See also ==
- Madhya Pradesh Legislative Assembly
- 2013 Madhya Pradesh Legislative Assembly election
- 2008 Madhya Pradesh Legislative Assembly election
