= Jhuma Solanki =

Indian politician

Member of the Madhya Pradesh Legislative Assembly
- Incumbent
- Assumed office 2013
- Constituency: Bhikangaon

Personal details
- Born: 2 April 1967 (age 59) Badia
- Party: Indian National Congress
- Spouse: Dr. Dhyan singh Solanki
- Education: LLB
- Profession: Politician
- As of 27 July, 2018 Source: ["Biography:Solanki, Jhuma" (PDF). Vidhan Sabha, Madhya Pradesh Legislative Assembly.]

Jhuma Solanki is an Indian politician and a member of the Indian National Congress party.

== Personal life ==
She is married to Dr. Dhyan Singh Solanki and has two daughters.

== Political career ==
She became an MLA for the first time in 2013.

== See also ==
- 2013 Madhya Pradesh Legislative Assembly election
