= Pramod Kumar Sharma =

Indian politician

Pramod Sharma

Member of Chhattisgarh Legislative Assembly
- In office 2018–2023
- Preceded by: Janak Ram Verma
- Constituency: Baloda Bazar

Personal details
- Born: Pramod Kumar Sharma Agra, Uttar Pradesh, India
- Party: Janta Congress Chhattisgarh
- Other political affiliations: Indian National Congress
- Parent: Prem Lal Sharma (father)
- Education: 12th Pass
- Profession: Contractor

Pramod Kumar Sharma is an Indian politician. He was elected to the Chhattisgarh Legislative Assembly from Baloda Bazar in the 2018 Chhattisgarh Legislative Assembly election as a member of the Janta Congress Chhattisgarh.
