= Barghat Assembly constituency =

Constituency of the Madhya Pradesh legislative assembly in India

Coordinates: 22.03°N 79.73°E

Barghat
- Constituency No. 114 for the Madhya Pradesh Legislative Assembly

Constituency details
- Country: India
- Region: Central India
- State: Madhya Pradesh
- District: Seoni
- Lok Sabha constituency: Balaghat
- Established: 1972
- Reservation: ST

Member of Legislative Assembly
- 16th Madhya Pradesh Legislative Assembly
- Incumbent Kamal Marskole
- Party: Bharatiya Janta Party
- Elected year: 2023
- Preceded by: Arjun Singh Kakodiya

Barghat Assembly constituency is one of the 230 Vidhan Sabha (Legislative Assembly) constituencies of Madhya Pradesh state in central India.

It is part of Seoni District.

== Members of the Legislative Assembly ==
| Election | Name | Party |
|---|---|---|
| 1952 | Ramrao Ubgade | Indian National Congress |
| 1957 | Ravindranath Bhargava | Indian National Congress |
| 1962 | Jageshwernath Bisen | Praja Socialist Party |
| 1967 | Ravindranath Bhargava | Indian National Congress |
| 1972 | Jageshwarnath Bisen | Bharatiya Jana Sangh |
| 1977 | Bharatlal Bisen | Indian National Congress |
| 1980 | Mahesh Prasad Mishra | Indian National Congress (Indira) |
| 1985 | Prabha Bhargava | Indian National Congress |
| 1990 | Dhal Singh Bisen | Bharatiya Janata Party |
| 1993 | Dhal Singh Bisen | Bharatiya Janata Party |
| 1998 | Dhal Singh Bisen | Bharatiya Janata Party |
| 2003 | Dhal Singh Bisen | Bharatiya Janata Party |
| 2008 | Kamal Marskole | Bharatiya Janata Party |
| 2013 | Kamal Marskole | Bharatiya Janata Party |
| 2018 | Arjun Singh Kakodiya | Indian National Congress |
| 2023 | Kamal Marskole | Bharatiya Janata Party |

== Election results ==
=== 2023 ===
2023 Madhya Pradesh Legislative Assembly election: Barghat
| Party | Candidate | Votes | % | ±% |
|---|---|---|---|---|
| BJP | Kamal Marskole | 112,074 | 51.83 | +7.95 |
| INC | Arjun Singh Kakodia | 94,993 | 43.93 | −3.96 |
| Independent | Sunil Uikey | 2,796 | 1.29 | |
| NOTA | None of the above | 2,209 | 1.02 | −0.24 |
| Majority | | 17,081 | 7.9 | +3.89 |
| Turnout | | 216,216 | 88.64 | +5.54 |
| BJP gain from INC | | Swing | | |

=== 2018 ===
2018 Madhya Pradesh Legislative Assembly election: Barghat
| Party | Candidate | Votes | % | ±% |
|---|---|---|---|---|
| INC | Arjun Singh Kakodiya | 90,053 | 47.89 | |
| BJP | Naresh Warkade | 82,526 | 43.88 | |
| GGP | Shrishyam Dhurvey | 6,320 | 3.36 | |
| BSP | Shashi/Kishori Bhalavi | 2,359 | 1.25 | |
| CPI(M) | Anil Sallam | 1,755 | 0.93 | |
| NOTA | None of the above | 2,372 | 1.26 | |
| Majority | | 7,527 | 4.01 | |
| Turnout | | 188,053 | 83.1 | |
| INC hold | | Swing | | |

== See also ==
- Barghat
