= Vinod Panthi =

India politician

Dr. Vinod Sundar Panthi

Member of the Madhya Pradesh Legislative Assembly
- In office 2008–2013
- Constituency: Bina

Personal details
- Born: 26 December 1966 (age 59)
- Party: Bhartiya Janta Party
- Spouse: Dr. Sundar Panthi
- Education: MBBS
- Alma mater: Jawaharlal Nehru Medical College, Ajmer, Rajasthan
- Profession: Doctor

Vinod Sundar Panthi (born 1966) is an Indian politician and social worker from Madhya Pradesh. She is a former Member of legislative assembly for Bina constituency of Madhya Pradesh and she won the election in 2008 as a member of Bhartiya Janata Party of Madhya Pradesh. She belong to the Koli caste of Madhya Pradesh.

== Early life and education ==
Panthi completed her graduation and received B.Sc. degree from Shaskiye Kanya Maha in 1985. Later, she did her MBBS from Ajmer from JawaharLal Medical College in 1994. She married Sundar Lal Panthi, who is also a medical doctor.

== Career ==
Panthi won the 2008 Madhya Pradesh Legislative Assembly election representing Bharatiya Janata Party from Bina Assembly Constituency Sagar district. She defeated Dr Om Prakash Kathoria of Indian National Congress by a margin of 6,409 votes. She is one of the 25 woman legislators in 2008.
