= Chowki Assembly constituency =

Constituency of the Chhattisgarh legislative assembly in India

Chowki
- Former constituency for the Chhattisgarh Legislative Assembly

Constituency details
- Country: India
- Region: Central India
- State: Chhattisgarh
- Established: 2003
- Abolished: 2008
- Total electors: 135,281
- Reservation: ST

Chowki Assembly constituency was an assembly constituency in the India state of Chhattisgarh.

== Members of the Legislative Assembly ==
Election	Member	Party
2003	Sanjeev Shah	Bharatiya Janata Party

== Election results ==
=== Assembly Election 2003 ===
2003 Chhattisgarh Legislative Assembly election : Chowki
Party	Candidate	Votes	%	±%
BJP	Sanjeev Shah	37,802	39.24%	New
INC	Sheoraj Singh Usare	36,267	37.65%	New
NCP	Makhan Lal Masiya (Guruji)	5,594	5.81%	New
GGP	Khushiyal Raw Mandavi	5,179	5.38%	New
BSP	Smt Khagesh Thakur	5,122	5.32%	New
Independent	Shivcharan Amariya	4,840	5.02%	New
Independent	Lakhan Shah	1,527	1.59%	New
Margin of victory		1,535	1.59%	
Turnout		96,331	71.24%	
Registered electors		135,281		
BJP win (new seat)				
