= Dhamdha Assembly constituency =

Constituency of the Chhattisgarh legislative assembly in India

Dhamdha
- Former constituency for the Chhattisgarh Legislative Assembly

Constituency details
- Country: India
- Region: Central India
- State: Chhattisgarh
- Established: 2003
- Abolished: 2008
- Total electors: 153,233

Dhamdha Assembly constituency was an assembly constituency in the India state of Chhattisgarh.

== Members of the Legislative Assembly ==
| Election | Member | Party |
|---|---|---|
| 2003 | Tamradhwaj Sahu | Indian National Congress |

== Election results ==
=== Assembly Election 2003 ===
2003 Chhattisgarh Legislative Assembly election : Dhamdha
| Party | Candidate | Votes | % | ±% |
|---|---|---|---|---|
| INC | Tamradhwaj Sahu | 48,661 | 42.30% | New |
| BJP | Jageshwar Sahu | 39,334 | 34.19% | New |
| NCP | Arun Agrawal | 13,350 | 11.61% | New |
| Independent | Sewak Ram Sahu | 3,451 | 3.00% | New |
| Independent | Jahar Lal Kurre | 3,043 | 2.65% | New |
| CPI | Mul Chand Deshlahra | 2,870 | 2.49% | New |
| Margin of victory | | 9,327 | 8.11% | |
| Turnout | | 115,032 | 75.08% | |
| Registered electors | | 153,233 | | |
| INC win (new seat) | | | | |
