= Bhanpuri Assembly constituency =

Constituency of the Chhattisgarh legislative assembly in India

Bhanpuri
- Former constituency for the Chhattisgarh Legislative Assembly

Constituency details
- Country: India
- Region: Central India
- State: Chhattisgarh
- Established: 2003
- Abolished: 2008
- Total electors: 133,148

Bhanpuri Assembly constituency

Bhanpuri Assembly constituency was an assembly constituency in the India state of Chhattisgarh.

== Members of the Legislative Assembly ==
Election	Member	Party
2003	Kedar Kshyap	Bharatiya Janata Party

== Election results ==
=== Assembly Election 2003 ===
2003 Chhattisgarh Legislative Assembly election : Bhanpuri
Party	Candidate	Votes	%	±%
BJP	Kedar Kshyap	41,023	47.35%	New
INC	Antu Ram Kashyap	29,631	34.20%	New
Independent	Madhu Ram Muraya	4,812	5.55%	New
NCP	Lakhamu Bharti	4,624	5.34%	New
CPI	Budhsan	3,775	4.36%	New
BSP	Chaturbhuj Baghel	2,781	3.21%	New
Margin of victory		11,392	13.15%	
Turnout		86,646	65.08%	
Registered electors		133,148		
BJP win (new seat)				
