= Tanakhar Assembly constituency =

Constituency of the Chhattisgarh legislative assembly in India

Tanakhar
- Former constituency for the Chhattisgarh Legislative Assembly

Constituency details
- Country: India
- Region: Central India
- State: Chhattisgarh
- Established: 2003
- Abolished: 2008
- Total electors: 165,839

Tanakhar Assembly constituency was an assembly constituency in the India state of Chhattisgarh.

== Members of the Legislative Assembly ==
| Election | Member | Party |
|---|---|---|
| 2003 | Ram Dayal Uike | Indian National Congress |

== Election results ==
=== Assembly Election 2003 ===
2003 Chhattisgarh Legislative Assembly election : Tanakhar
| Party | Candidate | Votes | % | ±% |
|---|---|---|---|---|
| INC | Ram Dayal Uike | 48,844 | 42.72% | New |
| GGP | Heera Singh Markam | 28,531 | 24.95% | New |
| Independent | Suraj Singh Shyam | 5,547 | 4.85% | New |
| NCP | Ramnarayan Maravi | 2,126 | 1.86% | New |
| Independent | Dhanwar Vedlal Vanwasi | 1,806 | 1.58% | New |
| Independent | Nohar Singh Binjhwar | 1,460 | 1.28% | New |
| Yuva Gantantra Party | Sundar Singh Markam | 1,334 | 1.17% | New |
| Margin of victory | | 20,313 | 17.77% | |
| Turnout | | 114,337 | 68.98% | |
| Registered electors | | 165,839 | | |
| INC win (new seat) | | | | |
