= Maro Assembly constituency =

Constituency of the Chhattisgarh legislative assembly in India

Maro
- Former constituency for the Chhattisgarh Legislative Assembly

Constituency details
- Country: India
- Region: Central India
- State: Chhattisgarh
- Established: 2003
- Abolished: 2008
- Total electors: 141,666

Maro Assembly constituency was an assembly constituency in the India state of Chhattisgarh.

== Members of the Legislative Assembly ==
Election	Member	Party
2003	Dayal Das Baghel	Bharatiya Janata Party

== Election results ==
=== Assembly Election 2003 ===
2003 Chhattisgarh Legislative Assembly election : Maro
Party	Candidate	Votes	%	±%
BJP	Dayal Das Baghel	45,279	46.65%	New
INC	Derhu Prasad Ghritlahare	33,620	34.64%	New
BSP	Suresh Banjare	7,299	7.52%	New
NCP	Goakaran Singh Kurrey	3,116	3.21%	New
Independent	Dayal Das Baghel	2,355	2.43%	New
GGP	Anant Jee Ratre	2,291	2.36%	New
Yuva Gantantra Party	Narendra Kumar	1,818	1.87%	New
Margin of victory		11,659	12.01%	
Turnout		97,054	68.65%	
Registered electors		141,666		
BJP win (new seat)				
