= Sipat Assembly constituency =

Constituency of the Chhattisgarh legislative assembly in India

Sipat
- Former constituency for the Chhattisgarh Legislative Assembly

Constituency details
- Country: India
- Region: Central India
- State: Chhattisgarh
- Established: 2003
- Abolished: 2008
- Total electors: 133,301

Sipat Assembly constituency was an assembly constituency in the India state of Chhattisgarh.

== Members of the Legislative Assembly ==
| Election | Member | Party |
|---|---|---|
| 2003 | Badhridhar Diwan | Bharatiya Janata Party |

== Election results ==
=== Assembly Election 2003 ===
2003 Chhattisgarh Legislative Assembly election : Sipat
| Party | Candidate | Votes | % | ±% |
|---|---|---|---|---|
| BJP | Badhridhar Diwan | 22,649 | 23.32% | New |
| INC | Ramesh Kumar Kaushik | 22,350 | 23.01% | New |
| NCP | Rajendra Chawla | 20,869 | 21.49% | New |
| BSP | Engg. Rameshwar Khare | 20,512 | 21.12% | New |
| GGP | Nand Kishor Raj | 4,024 | 4.14% | New |
| Independent | Santosh Agrawal | 2,392 | 2.46% | New |
| Independent | Sanjay Kumar Dubey | 1,095 | 1.13% | New |
| Margin of victory | | 299 | 0.31% | |
| Turnout | | 97,116 | 72.85% | |
| Registered electors | | 133,301 | | |
| BJP win (new seat) | | | | |
