= Saria Assembly constituency =

Constituency of the Chhattisgarh legislative assembly in India

Saria
- Former constituency for the Chhattisgarh Legislative Assembly

Constituency details
- Country: India
- Region: Central India
- State: Chhattisgarh
- Established: 2003
- Abolished: 2008
- Total electors: 121,178

Saria Assembly constituency was an assembly constituency in the India state of Chhattisgarh.

== Members of the Legislative Assembly ==
Election	Member	Party
2003	Dr. Shakajeet Nayak	Indian National Congress

== Election results ==
=== Assembly Election 2003 ===
2003 Chhattisgarh Legislative Assembly election : Saria
Party	Candidate	Votes	%	±%
INC	Dr. Shakajeet Nayak	39,962	37.84%	New
Independent	Virajeshwar Pradhan	21,669	20.52%	New
BJP	Jaganath Panigrahi	19,305	18.28%	New
NCP	Dr. Parivesh Mishra	9,235	8.74%	New
Independent	Nem Chand Agrawal	6,245	5.91%	New
Independent	Jawahar Lal	4,539	4.30%	New
JD(U)	Tathagat Shrivastava	2,103	1.99%	New
Margin of victory		18,293	17.32%	
Turnout		105,619	87.21%	
Registered electors		121,178		
INC win (new seat)				
