= Ratan Singh (Kotma MLA) =

Indian politician

Ratan Singh was an Indian politician from the state of Madhya Pradesh. He represented Kotma Vidhan Sabha constituency in Madhya Pradesh Legislative Assembly by winning General election of 1957.
