= Khertha Assembly constituency =

Constituency of the Chhattisgarh legislative assembly in India

Khertha
- Former constituency for the Chhattisgarh Legislative Assembly

Constituency details
- Country: India
- Region: Central India
- State: Chhattisgarh
- Established: 2003
- Abolished: 2008
- Total electors: 128,823

Khertha Assembly constituency was an assembly constituency in the India state of Chhattisgarh.

== Members of the Legislative Assembly ==
| Election | Member | Party |
|---|---|---|
| 2003 | Dr Balmukund Dewagan | Bharatiya Janata Party |

== Election results ==
=== Assembly Election 2003 ===
2003 Chhattisgarh Legislative Assembly election : Khertha
| Party | Candidate | Votes | % | ±% |
|---|---|---|---|---|
| BJP | Dr Balmukund Dewagan | 52,734 | 50.10% | New |
| INC | Pratima Chandrakar | 40,182 | 38.17% | New |
| Independent | Derha Ram | 2,999 | 2.85% | New |
| NCP | Mohan Lal Harmukh | 2,730 | 2.59% | New |
| Chhattisgarh Mukti Morcha | Dr Syam Kumar Ganwarey | 2,179 | 2.07% | New |
| Independent | Kishor Chandrakar (Rishi) | 1,644 | 1.56% | New |
| BSP | Bhusan Lal Sahu | 1,226 | 1.16% | New |
| Margin of victory | | 12,552 | 11.92% | |
| Turnout | | 105,258 | 81.82% | |
| Registered electors | | 128,823 | | |
| BJP win (new seat) | | | | |
