= Suneel Saraf =

Indian politician

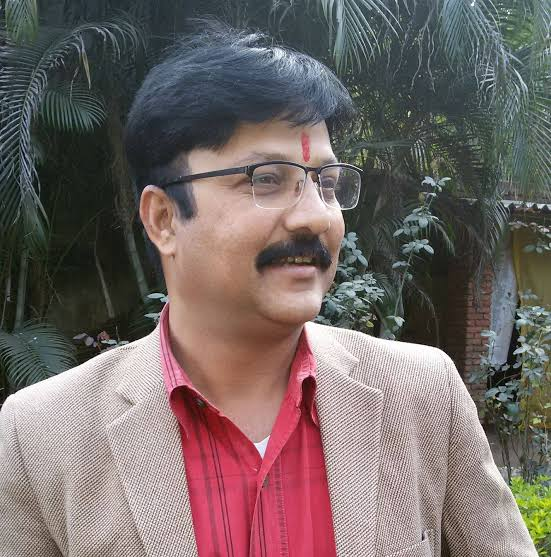

Member of the Madhya Pradesh Legislative Assembly
- Incumbent
- Assumed office 17 December 2018
- Preceded by: Manoj Kumar Agrawal
- Constituency: Kotma

Personal details
- Born: 1 January 1974 (age 52) Madhya Pradesh

Suneel Saraf is an Indian politician. He is a member of Madhya Pradesh legislative assembly. He was elected as MLA from Kotma Assembly constituency.
