= Pilkha Assembly constituency =

Constituency of the Chhattisgarh legislative assembly in India

Pilkha
- Former constituency for the Chhattisgarh Legislative Assembly

Constituency details
- Country: India
- Region: Central India
- State: Chhattisgarh
- Established: 2003
- Abolished: 2008
- Total electors: 169,604
- Reservation: ST

Pilkha was an assembly constituency in the India state of Chhattisgarh.

== Members of the Legislative Assembly ==
| Election | Member | Party |
|---|---|---|
| 2003 | Ramsewak Paikra | Bharatiya Janata Party |

== Election results ==
=== Assembly Election 2003 ===
2003 Chhattisgarh Legislative Assembly election : Pilkha
| Party | Candidate | Votes | % | ±% |
|---|---|---|---|---|
| BJP | Ramsewak Paikra | 59,967 | 51.31% | New |
| INC | Prem Sai | 39,466 | 33.77% | New |
| CPI | Birbal | 3,872 | 3.31% | New |
| Independent | Mahendra Prasad | 3,400 | 2.91% | New |
| CPI(M) | Bal Singh | 3,397 | 2.91% | New |
| GGP | Dubraj Singh | 2,246 | 1.92% | New |
| NCP | Raghuwar | 1,795 | 1.54% | New |
| Margin of victory | | 20,501 | 17.54% | |
| Turnout | | 116,874 | 68.91% | |
| Registered electors | | 169,604 | | |
| BJP win (new seat) | | | | |
