= Ravindranath Bhargava =

Indian politician

Ravindranath Bhargava was an Indian politician from the state of the Madhya Pradesh. He represented Barghat Vidhan Sabha constituency of undivided Madhya Pradesh Legislative Assembly by winning General election of 1957.
