= Keslur Assembly constituency =

Constituency of the Chhattisgarh legislative assembly in India

Keslur
- Former constituency for the Chhattisgarh Legislative Assembly

Constituency details
- Country: India
- Region: Central India
- State: Chhattisgarh
- Established: 2003
- Abolished: 2008
- Total electors: 127,467

Keslur Assembly constituency was an assembly constituency in the India state of Chhattisgarh.

== Members of the Legislative Assembly ==
Election	Member	Party
2003	Baiduram Kashyap	Bharatiya Janata Party

== Election results ==
=== Assembly Election 2003 ===
2003 Chhattisgarh Legislative Assembly election : Keslur
Party	Candidate	Votes	%	±%
BJP	Baiduram Kashyap	39,222	50.32%	New
INC	Mannu Ram Kachcha	15,164	19.46%	New
CPI	Ramnath Sarfe	9,304	11.94%	New
Independent	Harishankar Kashyap	5,482	7.03%	New
NCP	Sonsing Kashyap	2,772	3.56%	New
Independent	Sada	2,337	3.00%	New
BSP	Sonsai Kashyap	2,334	2.99%	New
Margin of victory		24,058	30.87%	
Turnout		77,941	61.15%	
Registered electors		127,467		
BJP win (new seat)				
