= Shivprasad Chanpuria =

Shivprasad Chanpuria was an Indian politician who was the member of Rajya Sabha from Madhya Pradesh from 10 April 1990 to 9 April 1996.

== Personal life ==
He was born in 1 March 1917 in the Jabalpur district, his parents were Chhote Lal Chanpuria and Kapoor Bai. He educated in a government high school in Damoh district and married Tarabai in June 1938.
