= Surajpur Assembly constituency =

Constituency of the Chhattisgarh legislative assembly in India

Surajpur
- Former constituency for the Chhattisgarh Legislative Assembly

Constituency details
- Country: India
- Region: Central India
- State: Chhattisgarh
- Established: 2003
- Abolished: 2008
- Total electors: 139,874

Surajpur Assembly constituency was an assembly constituency in the India state of Chhattisgarh.

== Members of the Legislative Assembly ==
| Election | Member | Party |
|---|---|---|
| 2003 | Shiv Pratap Singh | Bharatiya Janata Party |

== Election results ==
=== Assembly Election 2003 ===
2003 Chhattisgarh Legislative Assembly election : Surajpur
| Party | Candidate | Votes | % | ±% |
|---|---|---|---|---|
| BJP | Shiv Pratap Singh | 51,228 | 53.66% | New |
| INC | Bhanu Pratap Singh | 23,717 | 24.84% | New |
| Independent | Santlal Singh | 9,417 | 9.86% | New |
| NCP | Shiv Bachan | 3,876 | 4.06% | New |
| SP | Somaru Singh | 3,586 | 3.76% | New |
| Independent | Deo Narayan | 1,693 | 1.77% | New |
| GGP | Jainath Singh | 1,116 | 1.17% | New |
| Margin of victory | | 27,511 | 28.82% | |
| Turnout | | 95,473 | 68.26% | |
| Registered electors | | 139,874 | | |
| BJP win (new seat) | | | | |
