= Malkharoda Assembly constituency =

Constituency of the Chhattisgarh legislative assembly in India

Malkharoda
- Former constituency for the Chhattisgarh Legislative Assembly

Constituency details
- Country: India
- Region: Central India
- State: Chhattisgarh
- Established: 2003
- Abolished: 2008
- Total electors: 159,854

Malkharoda Assembly constituency was an assembly constituency in the India state of Chhattisgarh.

== Members of the Legislative Assembly ==
Election	Member	Party
2003	Lalsay Khunte	Bahujan Samaj Party

== Election results ==
=== Assembly Election 2003 ===
2003 Chhattisgarh Legislative Assembly election : Malkharoda
Party	Candidate	Votes	%	±%
BSP	Lalsay Khunte	34,360	32.00%	New
BJP	Nirmal Sinha	33,464	31.16%	New
INC	Chainsingh Samle	30,757	28.64%	New
NCP	Dayaram	2,936	2.73%	New
Independent	Rajkumar	2,195	2.04%	New
Shivsena	Jambulal Khunte	1,523	1.42%	New
SP	Bandhulal	1,474	1.37%	New
Margin of victory		896	0.83%	
Turnout		107,388	67.18%	
Registered electors		159,854		
BSP win (new seat)				
