= Bagicha Assembly constituency =

Constituency of the Chhattisgarh legislative assembly in India

Bagicha
- Former constituency for the Chhattisgarh Legislative Assembly

Constituency details
- Country: India
- Region: Central India
- State: Chhattisgarh
- Established: 2003
- Abolished: 2008
- Total electors: 120,993

Bagicha Assembly constituencywas an assembly constituency in the India state of Chhattisgarh.

== Members of the Legislative Assembly ==
Election	Member	Party
2003	Ganesh Ram Bhagat	Bharatiya Janata Party

== Election results ==
=== Assembly Election 2003 ===
2003 Chhattisgarh Legislative Assembly election : Bagicha
Party	Candidate	Votes	%	±%
BJP	Ganesh Ram Bhagat	43,846	50.27%	New
INC	Anand Lal Kujur	33,274	38.15%	New
Independent	Ram Muni	2,456	2.82%	New
NCP	Jowakim	1,996	2.29%	New
BSP	Hemlata	1,857	2.13%	New
Independent	Injor Sai	1,290	1.48%	New
Independent	Jeevan	1,132	1.30%	New
Margin of victory		10,572	12.12%	
Turnout		87,224	72.09%	
Registered electors		120,993		
BJP win (new seat)				
