= Champa Assembly constituency =

Constituency of the Chhattisgarh legislative assembly in India

Champa
- Former constituency for the Chhattisgarh Legislative Assembly

Constituency details
- Country: India
- Region: Central India
- State: Chhattisgarh
- Established: 2003
- Abolished: 2008
- Total electors: 164,786

Champa Assembly constituency was an assembly constituency in the India state of Chhattisgarh.

== Members of the Legislative Assembly ==
Election	Member	Party
2003	Moti Lal	Indian National Congress

== Election results ==
=== Assembly Election 2003 ===
2003 Chhattisgarh Legislative Assembly election : Champa
Party	Candidate	Votes	%	±%
INC	Moti Lal	52,075	42.62%	New
BJP	Narayan Prasad	44,365	36.31%	New
BSP	Udal	15,009	12.28%	New
NCP	Shashi	4,695	3.84%	New
Independent	Santosh Kumar	2,227	1.82%	New
Independent	Saheblal	1,314	1.08%	New
Independent	Saheb Lal Sahu	1,184	0.97%	New
Margin of victory		7,710	6.31%	
Turnout		122,185	74.18%	
Registered electors		164,786		
INC win (new seat)				
