= Chhattisgarh Council of Ministers =

Executive authority of Chhattisgarh, India

- छत्तीसगढ़ मंत्रिमंडल
- Emblem of Chhattisgarh

Agency overview
- Formed: 1 November 2000; 25 years ago
- Preceding agency: Government of Madhya Pradesh
- Type: Highest executive body of the Government of Chhattisgarh
- Jurisdiction: Chhattisgarh, India
- Headquarters: Mahanadi Bhawan, Mantralaya, Nava Raipur
- Agency executives: Vishnu Deo Sai, Chief Minister; Arun Sao, Deputy Chief Minister; Vijay Sharma, Deputy Chief Minister
- Website: www.cgstate.gov.in

The Chhattisgarh Council of Ministers is the principal executive organ of the Government of Chhattisgarh. It is chaired by the chief minister of Chhattisgarh and consists of various cabinet-rank ministers responsible for different executive departments.

== History and formation ==
The current council was formed following the 2023 Chhattisgarh Legislative Assembly election, which saw the Bharatiya Janata Party (BJP) winning 54 out of 90 seats. Vishnu Deo Sai was sworn in as the 4th chief minister of the state on 13 December 2023.

In August 2025, the cabinet was expanded to its full strength of 14 ministers (including the CM), following the "Haryana Model" for 90-member assemblies.

== Council of Ministers ==
Portfolio	Minister	Term Start	Party	Ref.
Chief Minister; General Administration, Mineral Resources, Energy, Public Relations, Aviation.	Vishnu Deo Sai	13 Dec 2023	BJP	
Deputy Chief Minister; Public Works, Public Health Engineering, Urban Administration.	Arun Sao	13 Dec 2023	BJP	
Deputy Chief Minister; Home Affairs, Rural Development & Panchayat, Technical Education.	Vijay Sharma	13 Dec 2023	BJP	
Finance, Commercial Tax, Housing & Environment	O. P. Choudhary	22 Dec 2023	BJP	
Health & Family Welfare, Medical Education; Other Backward Classes and Minorities Development.	Shyam Bihari Jaiswal	22 Dec 2023	BJP	
Commerce and Industry, Labour	Lakhan Lal Dewangan	22 Dec 2023	BJP	
Food, Civil Supplies and Consumer Protection	Dayaldas Baghel	22 Dec 2023	BJP	
Parliamentary Affairs, Water Resources, Forest	Kedar Nath Kashyap	22 Dec 2023	BJP	
Agriculture, Scheduled Tribes Development	Ramvichar Netam	22 Dec 2023	BJP	
Tourism and Culture, Religious Trusts	Rajesh Agrawal	20 Aug 2025	BJP	
Skill Development, Scheduled Caste Development	Guru Khushwant Saheb	20 Aug 2025	BJP	
School Education, Law & Legislative Affairs	Gajendra Yadav	20 Aug 2025	BJP	
Women and Child Development, Social Welfare	Laxmi Rajwade	22 Dec 2023	BJP	

== Oath of office and secrecy ==
In accordance with the Constitution of India, the governor of Chhattisgarh administers the oath of office and secrecy to the chief minister and members of the Council of Ministers at Raj Bhavan, Raipur.

=== Oath of office ===
I, <Name of Minister>, do swear in the name of God/solemnly affirm that I will bear true faith and allegiance to the Constitution of India as by law established, that I will uphold the sovereignty and integrity of India, that I will faithfully and conscientiously discharge my duties as a Minister for the State of Chhattisgarh and that I will do right to all manner of people in accordance with the Constitution and the law without fear or favour, affection or ill-will.

— Constitution of India, Third Schedule

=== Oath of secrecy ===
I, <Name of Minister>, do swear in the name of God/solemnly affirm that I will not directly or indirectly communicate or reveal to any person or persons any matter which shall be brought under my consideration or shall become known to me as a Minister for the State of Chhattisgarh except as may be required for the faithful discharge of my duties as such Minister.

— Constitution of India, Third Schedule
