= 6th Chhattisgarh Assembly =

6th Legislative Assembly of Chhattisgarh

←	5th Assembly

Overview
- Legislative body: Chhattisgarh Legislative Assembly
- Election: 2023 Chhattisgarh Legislative Assembly election
- Government: Bharatiya Janata Party
- Opposition: Indian National Congress
- Members: 90
- Speaker: Dr. Raman Singh, BJP
- Deputy Speaker: vacant
- Leader of the House: Vishnu Deo Sai, BJP
- Deputy Leader of the House: Vijay Sharma; Arun Sao, BJP
- Leader of the Opposition: Charan Das Mahant, INC
- Party control: Bharatiya Janata Party

The Sixth Legislative Assembly of Chhattisgarh was constituted after the 2023 Chhattisgarh Legislative Assembly elections which were concluded in November 2023 and the results were declared on 3 December 2023.

== Party wise distribution of seats ==

Party	No. MLAs	Leader of party in assembly	Leader's constituency
Bharatiya Janata Party	54	Vishnu Deo Sai	Kunkuri (ST)
Indian National Congress	35	Charan Das Mahant	Sakti
Gondwana Ganatantra Party	1	Tuleshwar Hira Singh Markam	Pali-Tanakhar (ST)

== Members of Legislative Assembly ==
District	Constituency		Member of Legislative Assembly		Remarks
District	No.	Name	Name	Party	Remarks
Manendragarh-Chirmiri-Bharatpur	1	Bharatpur-Sonhat (ST)	Renuka Singh	BJP	
Manendragarh-Chirmiri-Bharatpur	2	Manendragarh	Shyam Bihari Jaiswal	BJP	
Koriya	3	Baikunthpur	Bhaiyalal Rajwade	BJP	
Surajpur	4	Premnagar	Bhulan Singh Marabi	BJP	
Surajpur	5	Bhatgaon	Laxmi Rajwade	BJP	
Balrampur	6	Pratappur (ST)	Shakuntala Singh Portey	BJP	
Balrampur	7	Ramanujganj (ST)	Ramvichar Netam	BJP	Pro tem Speaker of state legislative assembly
Balrampur	8	Samri	Uddheshwari Paikra	BJP	
Surguja	9	Lundra (ST)	Prabodh Minz	BJP	
Surguja	10	Ambikapur	Rajesh Agrawal	BJP	
Surguja	11	Sitapur (ST)	Ramkumar Toppo	BJP	
Jashpur	12	Jashpur (ST)	Raymuni Bhagat	BJP	
Jashpur	13	Kunkuri (ST)	Vishnudeo Sai	BJP	Chief Minister
Jashpur	14	Pathalgaon (ST)	Gomati Sai	BJP	
Raigarh	15	Lailunga (ST)	Vidyawati Sidar	INC	
Raigarh	16	Raigarh	O. P. Choudhary	BJP	
Sarangarh-Bilaigarh	17	Sarangarh (SC)	Uttari Ganpat Jangde	INC	
Sarangarh-Bilaigarh	18	Kharsia	Umesh Patel	INC	
Raigarh	19	Dharamjaigarh (ST)	Laljeet Singh Rathia	INC	
Korba	20	Rampur (ST)	Phool Singh Rathiya	INC	
Korba	21	Korba	Lakhan Lal Dewangan	BJP	
Korba	22	Katghora	Premchand Patel	BJP	
Korba	23	Pali-Tanakhar (ST)	Tuleshwar Hira Singh Markam	GGP	
Gaurela Pendra Marwahi	24	Marwahi (ST)	Pranav Kumar Marpachi	BJP	
Gaurela Pendra Marwahi	25	Kota	Atal Shrivastava	INC	
Mungeli	26	Lormi	Arun Sao	BJP	
Mungeli	27	Mungeli (SC)	Punnulal Mohle	BJP	
Bilaspur	28	Takhatpur	Dharmjeet Singh Thakur	BJP	
Bilaspur	29	Bilha	Dharamlal Kaushik	BJP	
Bilaspur	30	Bilaspur	Amar Agrawal	BJP	
Bilaspur	31	Beltara	Sushant Shukla	BJP	
Bilaspur	32	Masturi (SC)	Dilip Lahariya	INC	Deputy Whip Congress
Janjgir-Champa	33	Akaltara	Raghavendra Kumar Singh	INC	
Janjgir-Champa	34	Janjgir-Champa	Vyas Kashyap	INC	
Sakti	35	Sakti	Charan Das Mahant	INC	
Sakti	36	Chandrapur	Ram Kumar Yadav	INC	
Sakti	37	Jaijaipur	Baleshwar Sahu	INC	
Janjgir-Champa	38	Pamgarh (SC)	Sheshraj Harbansh	INC	
Mahasamund	39	Saraipali (SC)	Chaturi Nand	INC	
Mahasamund	40	Basna	Sampat Agrawal	BJP	
Mahasamund	41	Khallari	Dwarikadhish Yadav	INC	
Mahasamund	42	Mahasamund	Yogeshwar Raju Sinha	BJP	
Sarangarh-Bilaigarh	43	Bilaigarh (SC)	Kavita Pran Lahrey	INC	
Baloda Bazar	44	Kasdol	Sandeep Sahu	INC	
Baloda Bazar	45	Baloda Bazar	Tank Ram Verma	BJP	
Baloda Bazar	46	Bhatapara	Inder Kumar Sao	INC	
Raipur	47	Dharsiwa	Anuj Sharma	BJP	
Raipur	48	Raipur Rural	Motilal Sahu	BJP	
Raipur	49	Raipur City West	Rajesh Munat	BJP	
Raipur	50	Raipur City North	Purandar Mishra	BJP	
Raipur	51	Raipur City South	Brijmohan Agrawal	BJP	Resigned on 17 June 2024
Raipur	51	Raipur City South	Sunil Kumar Soni	BJP	By elected in 2024
Raipur	52	Arang	Guru Khushwant Saheb	BJP	
Raipur	53	Abhanpur	Indra Kumar Sahu	BJP	
Gariaband	54	Rajim	Rohit Sahu	BJP	
Gariaband	55	Bindrawagarh (ST)	Janak Dhruw	INC	
Dhamtari	56	Sihawa (ST)	Ambika Markam	INC	
Dhamtari	57	Kurud	Ajay Chandrakar	BJP	
Dhamtari	58	Dhamtari	Onkar Sahu	INC	
Balod	59	Sanjari-Balod	Sangeeta Sinha	INC	
Balod	60	Dondi Lohara (ST)	Anila Bhendiya	INC	
Balod	61	Gunderdehi	Kunwer Singh Nishad	INC	
Durg	62	Patan	Bhupesh Baghel	INC	
Durg	63	Durg Rural	Lalit Chandrakar	BJP	
Durg	64	Durg City	Gajendra Yadav	BJP	
Durg	65	Bhilai Nagar	Devender Singh Yadav	INC	
Durg	66	Vaishali Nagar	Rikesh Sen	BJP	
Durg	67	Ahiwara (SC)	Domanlal Korsewada	BJP	Died in office on 30 October 2026
Bemetara	68	Saja	Ishwar Sahu	BJP	
Bemetara	69	Bemetara	Dipesh Sahu	BJP	
Bemetara	70	Navagarh (SC)	Dayaldas Baghel	BJP	
Kabirdham	71	Pandariya	Bhawna Bohra	BJP	
Kabirdham	72	Kawardha	Vijay Sharma	BJP	
Rajnandgaon	73	Khairagarh	Yashoda Verma	INC	
Rajnandgaon	74	Dongargarh (SC)	Harshita Swami Baghel	INC	
Rajnandgaon	75	Rajnandgaon	Dr. Raman Singh	BJP	
Rajnandgaon	76	Dongargaon	Daleshwar Sahu	INC	Chief Whip Congress
Rajnandgaon	77	Khujji	Bholaram Sahu	INC	
Rajnandgaon	78	Mohla-Manpur	Indrashah Mandavi	INC	
Kanker	79	Antagarh (ST)	Vikram Usendi	BJP	
Kanker	80	Bhanupratappur (ST)	Savitri Manoj Mandavi	INC	
Kanker	81	Kanker (ST)	Asha Ram Netam	BJP	
Kondagaon	82	Keshkal (ST)	Neelkanth Tekam	BJP	
Kondagaon	83	Kondagaon (ST)	Lata Usendi	BJP	
Narayanpur	84	Narayanpur (ST)	Kedar Nath Kashyap	BJP	
Bastar	85	Bastar (ST)	Lakheshwar Baghel	INC	Deputy Leader of Oppisition
Bastar	86	Jagdalpur	Kiran Singh Deo	BJP	
Bastar	87	Chitrakot (ST)	Vinayak Gotay	BJP	
Dantewada	88	Dantewada (ST)	Chaitram Atami	BJP	
Bijapur	89	Bijapur (ST)	Vikram Mandavi	INC	
Sukma	90	Konta (ST)	Kawasi Lakhma	INC	

== See also ==
- Chhattisgarh Legislative Assembly
- 2023 Chhattisgarh Legislative Assembly election
