= Sai ministry =

Indian state administration

- 6th Ministry of Chhattisgarh

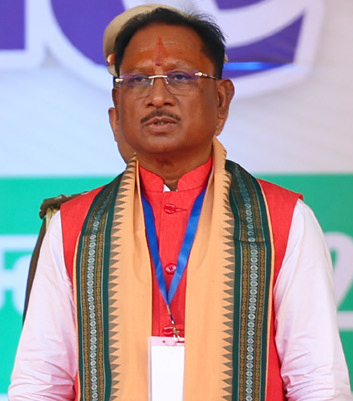
- Vishnu Deo Sai
- Date formed: 13 December 2023

People and organisations
- Governor: Ramen Deka
- Chief Minister: Vishnu Deo Sai
- Deputy Chief Minister: Arun Sao; Vijay Sharma
- No. of ministers: 14 (including CM)
- Ministers removed: 1 resigned
- Member parties: BJP
- Status in legislature: Majority
- Opposition party: Indian National Congress
- Opposition leader: Charan Das Mahant

History
- Election: 2023
- Outgoing election: 2023
- Legislature term: 5 years
- Predecessor: Baghel ministry

The Vishnu Deo Sai ministry represents the formation of the fifth cabinet of the Indian state Chhattisgarh under the leadership of Vishnu Deo Sai, who is elected as the fourth Chief Minister of Chhattisgarh. The Bharatiya Janata Party (BJP), led by Vishnudeo Sai, secured an absolute majority in the 2023 Chhattisgarh Legislative Assembly election, winning 54 out of the 90 seats in the state assembly.

== Council of Ministers ==
Portfolio	Minister	Took office	Left office	Party
Chief Minister: General Administration; Mineral Resources; Energy; Public Relation; Transport; Excise; Any other departments not allocated to any Minister.	Vishnu Deo Sai	13 December 2023	Incumbent	BJP
Deputy Chief Minister: Public Works Department; Public Health Engineering; Law & Legislative Affairs; Urban Administration & Development	Arun Sao	13 December 2023	Incumbent	BJP
Deputy Chief Minister: Home Affairs; Rural Development and Panchayat; Technical Education; Science and Technology	Vijay Sharma	13 December 2023	Incumbent	BJP
Minister of School Education; Minister of Law & Legislative Affairs; Village Industries	Gajendra Yadav	20 August 2025	Incumbent	BJP
Agriculture; Scheduled Tribes Development	Ramvichar Netam	22 December 2023	Incumbent	BJP
Food, Civil Supplies and Consumer Protection	Dayaldas Baghel	22 December 2023	Incumbent	BJP
Parliamentary Affairs; Water Resources; Forest and Climate Change; Cooperatives	Kedar Nath Kashyap	22 December 2023	Incumbent	BJP
Commerce and Industry; Labour	Lakhan Lal Dewangan	22 December 2023	Incumbent	BJP
Health and Family Welfare; Medical Education; Other Backward Classes and Minorities Development; 20-Point Implementation	Shyam Bihari Jaiswal	22 December 2023	Incumbent	BJP
Finance; Commercial Tax; Housing; Environment; Planning, Economics and Statistics	O. P. Choudhary	22 December 2023	Incumbent	BJP
Women and Child Development; Social Welfare	Laxmi Rajwade	22 December 2023	Incumbent	BJP
Revenue; Disaster Management; Sports and Youth Welfare	Tank Ram Verma	22 December 2023	Incumbent	BJP
Minister of Tourism and Culture; Minister of Dharmik Nyas (Religious Trust) and Dharmsva	Rajesh Agrawal	20 August 2025	Incumbent	BJP
Skill development; Technical Education and Employment; Scheduled Caste Development	Guru Khushwant Saheb	20 August 2025	Incumbent	BJP
School Education; Public Health Engineering; Law & Legislative Affairs; Urban Administration & Development; Minister of Higher Education; Minister of Tourism and Culture; Minister of Dharmik Nyas (Religious Trust) and Dharmsva	Brijmohan Agrawal	22 December 2023	19 June 2024	BJP

== Achievements ==
=== Philanthropy ===
Beyond politics, Sai has actively engaged in social work, particularly focused on tribal education and the development of essential infrastructure in tribal regions. He has been a consistent advocate for improving the living standards of backward tribes, reflecting a deep-rooted commitment to social welfare. Known for his reverence for Lord Shri Ram, Sai staunchly opposes conversions through compulsion or deception.

=== Kanwar Community Development ===
Vishnu Deo Sai and his wife, Kaushalya Sai, are involved in community development and education awareness initiatives within the Kanwar tribe of Chhattisgarh. The Kanwar tribe has a significant population in northern Chattisgarh, primarily across the six districts of the Surguja division, as well as in Bilaspur, Korba, Raigarh, and Janjgir.

=== Naxalism Stance ===
Since assuming the role of Chief Minister of Chhattisgarh, Vishnu Deo Sai has swiftly implemented numerous decisive measures for public welfare, profoundly impacting both the state and national political landscape. In tackling the longstanding issue of Naxalism in Chhattisgarh, Sai has employed a strategy of "Boli ka Jawab Boli Se aur Goli ka Jawab Goli" (dialogue for dialogue, and bullet for bullet).

Within a mere four months of his tenure, security forces engaged in multiple encounters with Maoists in Bastar, resulting in the killing of over 100 Naxalites, including several high-profile leaders with substantial bounties on their heads. Notably, a large number of Maoists and their supporters have surrendered, drawn by the rehabilitation policies of the Chhattisgarh Government. Concurrently, the Vishnu Deo Sai government has significantly increased the number of security camps in Bastar. The "Niyad Nellnar" scheme has been initiated to foster Bastar's development through these security camps, ensuring that villages within a five-kilometer radius receive the benefits of various Central and State Government schemes, thereby promoting comprehensive community development.

=== Pradhan Mantri Awas Yojana ===
In compliance to the Prime Minister's guarantee, the construction of permanent housing under the Pradhan Mantri Awas Yojana has commenced for over 1.8 million poor families in the state.

=== Governance ===
Vishnu Deo Sai established Good Governance. Government has taken consistent action against corruption. Numerous cases of corruption alleged to have occurred during the tenure of the previous Congress government are being swiftly investigated. These cases involve a range of scandals, including those related to coal, liquor, sand, teacher recruitment, PSC recruitment, and the Mahadev app. The involvement of key political figures from the Congress party in these scandals has garnered national attention, placing these cases in the spotlight on a broader scale.

On Good Governance Day, 25 December 2023, the state government transferred an amount of ₹3,716 crore as two years' pending bonus into the bank accounts of 1.3 million farmers, thus fulfilling the guarantee.

The 'Shri Ramlala Ayodhya Dham' Darshan Yojana in Chhattisgarh has also been started by the Vishnu Deo Sai administration. This program offers the state's believers free pilgrimage tours to Ayodhya.

With the hike in remuneration rate for Tendu Patta collection from ₹4,000 per standard bag to ₹5,500 per standard bag, Vishnu Deo Sai government has benefited 12 lakh 50 thousand families engaged in Tendu Patta collection.

=== Krishak Unnati Yojana ===
The Vishnu Deo Sai administration of Chhattisgarh has fulfilled the guarantee under the Krishak Unnati Yojana by purchasing paddy from farmers at a rate of ₹3,100 per quintal, with a maximum of 21 quintals per acre. A record-breaking 14.492 lakh metric tons of paddy were procured from 24 lakh 75 thousand farmers in the state in 2023–2024. The support price of ₹31,913 crore and the differential amount of ₹13,320 crore have been disclosed.

=== Women empowerment ===
'Mahatari Vandan Yojana' has been introduced by the Vishnu Deo Sai government to support women's socio-economic empowerment in the state. More than 70 lakh women in the state are receiving ₹1,000 a month deposited into their bank accounts under this plan.

On the lines of Prime Minister Narendra Modi's call to build 'Developed India', the Vishnu Deo Sai government has set a goal to build 'Developed Chhattisgarh'. In the same sequence, the state government is preparing a vision document titled "Amritkal Chhattisgarh Vision @2047."

=== CIDC deceased Employees Long-Standing Compassionate Appointment Problem ===
On 14th July 2026, following directives from Chief Minister Vishnu Deo Sai, the Government of Chhattisgarh established a seven-member inter-departmental committee to formulate a new compassionate appointment policy. The policy specifically addresses pending job applications for the dependents of deceased employees from the defunct State Transport Corporation, whose administrative affairs are currently managed under the Chhattisgarh Industrial Development Corporation (CIDC).The composition of the seven-member committee relies on institutional designations rather than individual appointments:-

• Chairperson: Secretary, General Administration Department (GAD)

• Committee Members: Five senior administrative officers representing the Department of Finance, the Department of Transport, and the State Legal Cell

• Member Secretary: A designated administrative officer from the General Administration Department (GAD)

The panel was granted a mandate to resolve long-standing employment claims and submit its comprehensive policy report within a one-month timeframe.

== Former Members ==
No..	Name (Constituency)	Departments	Tenure	Reason	Party
1.	Brijmohan Agrawal; Cabinet Minister (Raipur City South)	Minister of School Education; Minister of Higher Education; Minister of Tourism and Culture; Minister of Parliamentary Affairs	22 December 2023 – 19 June 2024	Elected to Lok Sabha on 4 June 2024	BJP

== Demographics of Council of Ministers ==
The following table provides a breakdown of the Vishnu Deo Sai ministry by region and social category as of February 2026. After the 2025 expansion, the cabinet reached its maximum strength of 14 ministers.

=== Representation by district ===
Representation of ministers by district (Total: 14)
1. Jashpur (7.14%)
2. Mungeli (7.14%)
3. Kabirdham (7.14%)
4. Balrampur (7.14%)
5. Bemetara (7.14%)
6. Narayanpur (7.14%)
7. Korba (7.14%)
8. MCB (7.14%)
9. Raigarh (7.14%)
10. Baloda Bazar (7.14%)
11. Surajpur (7.14%)
12. Durg (7.14%)
13. Surguja (7.14%)
14. Raipur (7.14%)

District	Ministers	Name of Ministers	Constituency
Balod	0		
Baloda Bazar	1	Tank Ram Verma	Baloda Bazar
Balrampur	1	Ramvichar Netam	Ramanujganj
Bastar	0		
Bemetara	1	Dayaldas Baghel	Navagarh
Bijapur	0		
Bilaspur	0		
Dantewada	0		
Dhamtari	0		
Durg	1	Gajendra Yadav	Durg City
Gariaband	0		
GPM	0		
Janjgir–Champa	0		
Jashpur	1	Vishnu Deo Sai (CM)	Kunkuni
Kabirdham	1	Vijay Sharma (Dy. CM)	Kawardha
Kanker	0		
Kondagaon	0		
Korba	1	Lakhan Lal Dewangan	Korba
Koriya	0		
Mahasamund	0		
MCB	1	Shyam Bihari Jaiswal	Manendragarh
Mohla-Manpur	0		
Mungeli	1	Arun Sao (Dy. CM)	Lormi
Narayanpur	1	Kedar Nath Kashyap	Narayanpur
Raigarh	1	O. P. Choudhary	Raigarh
Raipur	1	Guru Khushwant Saheb	Arang
Rajnandgaon	0		
Sakti	0		
Sarangarh–Bilaigarh	0		
Sukma	0		
Surajpur	1	Laxmi Rajwade	Bhatgaon
Surguja	1	Rajesh Agrawal	Ambikapur
Khairagarh	0		

=== By Region ===
Region	No. of Ministers	Name of Ministers
Sarguja	5	Vishnu Deo Sai (CM), Ramvichar Netam, Shyam Bihari Jaiswal, Laxmi Rajwade, Rajesh Agrawal
Bilaspur	3	Arun Sao (Dy CM), Lakhan Lal Dewangan, O. P. Choudhary
Durg	3	Vijay Sharma (Dy CM), Gajendra Yadav, Dayaldas Baghel
Raipur	2	Tank Ram Verma, Guru Khushwant Saheb
Bastar	1	Kedar Nath Kashyap
Total	14	

=== By Social Category ===
Category	No. of Ministers	Percentage	Name of Ministers
OBC	7	50%	Arun Sao, O. P. Choudhary, Lakhan Lal Dewangan, Shyam Bihari Jaiswal, Gajendra Yadav, Laxmi Rajwade, Tank Ram Verma
ST	3	21%	Vishnu Deo Sai, Ramvichar Netam, Kedar Nath Kashyap
General	2	14.28%	Vijay Sharma, Rajesh Agrawal
SC	2	15%	Dayaldas Baghel, Guru Khushwant Saheb
Total	14	100%	
