= Bharatiya Janata Party – Chhattisgarh =

Chhattisgarh affiliate of the Bharatiya Janata Party

- Abbreviation: BJP
- Leader: Vishnu Deo Sai (Chief Minister)
- President: Kiran Singh Deo
- General Secretary: Pawan Sai
- Founder: Atal Bihari Vajpayee; Lal Krishna Advani; Murli Manohar Joshi; Nanaji Deshmukh; K. R. Malkani; Sikandar Bakht; Vijay Kumar Malhotra; Vijaya Raje Scindia; Bhairon Singh Shekhawat; Shanta Kumar; Ram Jethmalani; Jagannathrao Joshi
- Founded: 6 April 1980 (46 years ago)
- Headquarters: Kushabhau Thakre Parisar Boriyakala, Raipur - 492 015 Chhattisgarh
- Colours: Saffron
- Seats in Rajya Sabha: 2 / 5
- Seats in Lok Sabha: 10 / 11
- Seats in Chhattisgarh Legislative Assembly: 54 / 90

Election symbol
- Lotus

Party flag

Website
- www.bjpcg.com

Bharatiya Janata Party – Chhattisgarh or simply, BJP Chhattisgarh is an affiliate of the Bharatiya Janata Party for the state of Chhattisgarh. Its head office is situated at the Kushabhau Thakre Parisar Boriyakala, Raipur. On 13 December 2023, Kunkuri MLA Vishnu Deo Sai took oath as Chief Minister of Chhattisgarh and Arun Sao and Vijay Sharma were elected as Deputy Chief Ministers of Chhattisgarh.

== Electoral history ==
=== Legislative Assembly election ===
Year	Seats won	+/-	Voteshare (%)	+/-	Outcome
2003	50 / 90	▲50	39.26%	New	Government
2008	50 / 90	Steady	40.33%	▲1.07	Government
2013	49 / 90	▼1	41.04%	▲0.71	Government
2018	15 / 90	▼34	32.97%	▼8.07	Opposition
2023	54 / 90	▲39	46.27%	▲13.33	Government

=== Lok Sabha election ===
Year	Seats won	+/-	Outcome
2004	10 / 11	Steady	Opposition
2009	10 / 11	Steady	Opposition
2014	10 / 11	Steady	Government
2019	9 / 11	▼1	Government
2024	10 / 11	▲1	Government

== Leadership ==
=== Chief Minister ===
#	Portrait	Name	Constituency	Term			Assembly
1		Raman Singh	Dongargaon	7 December 2003	12 December 2008	15 years, 10 days	2nd
1		Raman Singh	Rajnandgaon	12 December 2008	12 December 2013	15 years, 10 days	3rd
1		Raman Singh	Rajnandgaon	12 December 2013	17 December 2018	15 years, 10 days	4th
2		Vishnu Deo Sai	Kunkuri	13 December 2023	Incumbent	2 years, 145 days	6th

=== Deputy Chief Minister ===
#	Portrait	Name	Constituency	Term			Assembly	Chief minister
1		Arun Sao	Lormi	13 December 2023	Incumbent	2 years, 145 days	6th	Vishnu Deo Sai
2		Vijay Sharma	Kawardha	13 December 2023	Incumbent	2 years, 145 days	6th	Vishnu Deo Sai

=== Leader of the Opposition ===
#	Portrait	Name	Term			Assembly	Chief minister
1		Nand Kumar Sai	14 December 2000	5 December 2003	2 years, 356 days	1st	Ajit Jogi
2		Dharamlal Kaushik	4 January 2019	17 August 2022	3 years, 225 days	5th	Bhupesh Baghel
3		Narayan Chandel	17 August 2022	3 December 2023	3 years, 263 days	5th	Bhupesh Baghel

=== President ===
#	Portrait	Name	Period		
1		Tarachand Sahu	1-Nov-2000	05-Aug-2002	1 year, 277 days
2		Raman Singh	05-Aug-2002	2003	
3		Nand Kumar Sai	2003	2005	
4		Shiv Pratap Singh	2005	2006	
5		Vishnudeo Sai	31-Oct-2006	11-May-2010	3 years, 192 days
6		Ram Sewak Paikra	11-May-2010	21-Jan-2014	3 years, 255 days
(5)		Vishnudeo Sai	21-Jan-2014	16-Aug-2014	207 days
6		Dharamlal Kaushik	16-Aug-2014	8-Mar-2019	4 years, 204 days
7		Vikram Usendi	8-Mar-2019	2-Jun-2020	1 year, 86 days
(5)		Vishnudeo Sai	2-Jun-2020	9-Aug-2022	2 years, 68 days
8		Arun Sao	9-Aug-2022	21-Dec-2023	1 year, 134 days
9		Kiran Singh Deo	21-Dec-2023	Incumbent	2 years, 137 days

== See also ==
- Bharatiya Janata Party – Gujarat
- Bharatiya Janata Party – Uttar Pradesh
- Bharatiya Janata Party – Madhya Pradesh
- State units of the Bharatiya Janata Party
