= Jai Singh Agrawal =

Indian politician from Chhattisgarh

Minister of Revenue, Government of Chhattisgarh
- In office 25 December 2018 – 3 December 2023
- Chief Minister: Bhupesh Baghel
- Preceded by: Prem Prakash Pandey
- Succeeded by: Tank Ram Verma

Member of Chhattisgarh Legislative Assembly
- In office December 2008 – 3 December 2023
- Preceded by: Constituency Established
- Succeeded by: Lakhan Lal Dewangan
- Constituency: Korba

Personal details
- Born: 1 March 1963 (age 62); Matanhail, Haryana, India
- Political party: Indian National Congress (since 2008)
- Spouse: Renu Agrawal
- Children: 2

Jai Singh Agrawal is an Indian Politician from Indian National Congress. He is former Revenue Minister of Chhattisgarh represented Korba (21) from 2008 to 2023.
