= Vinay Jaiswal =

Indian ophthalmologist and politician

Member of the Chhattisgarh Legislative Assembly
- In office 2018–2023
- Preceded by: Shyam Bihari Jaiswal
- Succeeded by: Shyam Bihari Jaiswal
- Constituency: Manendragarh

Personal details
- Party: Indian National Congress
- Profession: Ophthalmologist

Vinay Jaiswal is an Indian ophthalmologist and politician from Chhattisgarh. He represented the Manendragarh Assembly constituency in the Chhattisgarh Legislative Assembly from 2018 to 2023 as a member of the Indian National Congress. He is a co-founder and director of Shri Ganesh Vinayak Eye Hospital in Raipur.

== Early life and education ==
Jaiswal was admitted to medical college through the pre-medical test. He began his MBBS studies at the medical college in Raipur in 1996. He later completed postgraduate training in ophthalmology and a fellowship in phacoemulsification (cataract) surgery.

== Medical career ==
From 2001, Jaiswal worked as a contractual doctor at Khadgawan in Koriya district. He served as president of the Junior Doctors Association, and from 2009 to 2014 as treasurer of the Raipur division of the state ophthalmic society. In 2007 he co-founded Shri Ganesh Vinayak Eye Hospital in Raipur with ophthalmologist Charudutt Kalamkar. His occupation in his 2018 election profile was given as eye specialist at the hospital.

== Political career ==
In 2012 Jaiswal became state vice-president of the medical cell of the Chhattisgarh Pradesh Congress Committee. In the 2018 Chhattisgarh Legislative Assembly election, he was the Congress candidate for Manendragarh. He defeated the sitting Bharatiya Janata Party MLA, Shyam Bihari Jaiswal, by 4,074 votes.

As MLA he raised drinking-water supply problems in South Eastern Coalfields colonies in Chirmiri. In 2023, he welcomed the state government's decision to grant land leases to residents of Manendragarh, a demand he had taken up with the government on behalf of the local chamber of commerce.

For the 2023 Chhattisgarh Legislative Assembly election, Congress fielded Ramesh Singh Vakil from Manendragarh instead. Shyam Bihari Jaiswal of the BJP won the seat.

== Electoral history ==
Year	Constituency	Party	Result
2018	Manendragarh	Indian National Congress	Won
