= T. S. Singh Deo =

Indian politician

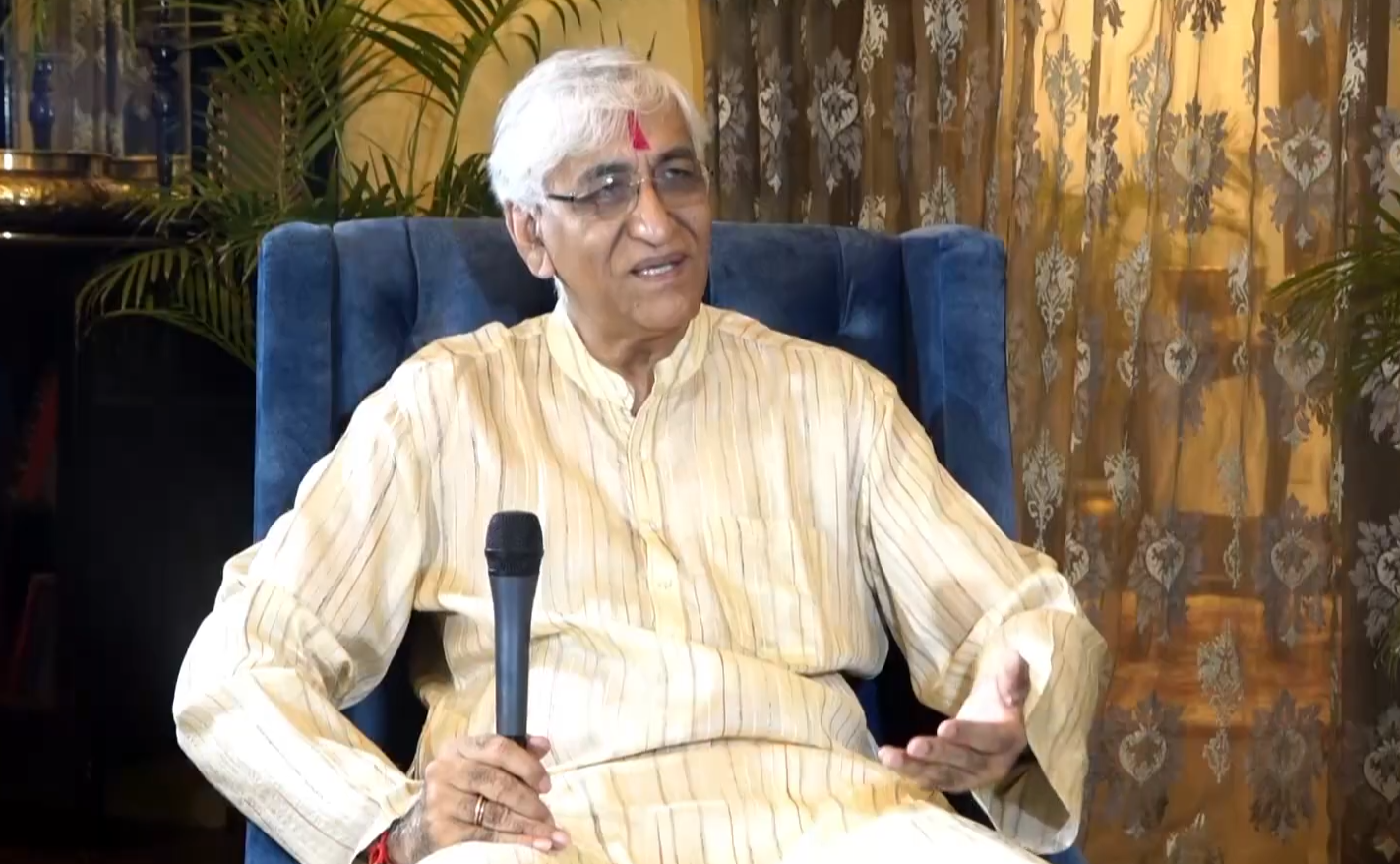
- Deo in 2021

1st Deputy Chief Minister of Chhattisgarh
- In office 28 June 2023 – 12 December 2023
- Governor: B. Harichandan
- Chief Minister: Bhupesh Baghel
- Preceded by: Position established
- Succeeded by: Arun Sao; Vijay Sharma

Cabinet Minister, Government of Chhattisgarh
- In office 17 December 2018 – 12 December 2023
- Chief Minister: Bhupesh Baghel
- Succeeded by: Shyam Bihari Jaiswal
- Ministry and Departments: Health and Family Welfare.; Medical Education.; 20 Point Program Implementation.; Commercial taxes (GST).; Energy.

Member of the Chhattisgarh Legislative Assembly
- In office 8 December 2008 – 3 December 2023
- Preceded by: Kamal Bhan Singh
- Succeeded by: Rajesh Agrawal
- Constituency: Ambikapur

Leader of the Opposition Chhattisgarh Legislative Assembly
- In office 6 January 2013 – 12 December 2018
- Chief Minister: Dr. Raman Singh
- Speaker: Gaurishankar Agrawal
- Preceded by: Ravindra Choubey
- Succeeded by: Dharamlal Kaushik

Titular Maharaja of Surguja
- Incumbent
- Assumed office 2001
- Preceded by: Madneshwar Saran Singh Deo

Personal details
- Born: 31 October 1952 (age 73) Allahabad, Uttar Pradesh, India
- Party: Indian National Congress
- Relations: See Surguja State
- Parent(s): Madneshwar Saran Singh Deo (father); Devendrakumari Singh Deo (mother)
- Education: B.A. in History, M.A. in History
- Alma mater: Hindu College, Delhi (B.A.) Hamidia College, Bhopal (M.A.)
- Profession: Politician
- As of 17 June, 2018 Source: ["Biography". Vidhan Sabha, Chhattisgarh Legislative Assembly.]

Tribhuvaneshwar Saran Singh Deo (born 31 October 1952), also known by his initials as T. S. Singh Deo or T. S. Baba, is an Indian politician from Ambikapur, Chhattisgarh. He was the First Deputy Chief Minister of Chhattisgarh from June 2023 to December 2023.

He is also the current titular Maharaja of Surguja, with headquarters at Ambikapur. He was the last mentor to sit on the throne of Surguja.

== Political career ==
He was richest member of Chhattisgarh Legislative Assembly in 2023.

He served as the Leader of Opposition in 4th Vidhan Sabha of Chhattisgarh. He also served as a Cabinet Minister for Health in the Chhattisgarh government from 2018 to 2023.

T.S. Singh Deo has been elected from Ambikapur Assembly Constituency 3 times since 2008 to 2023, losing by a margin of 94 against his BJP candidate Rajesh Agrawal in the most recent 2023 elections.

He has been an active politician in demonstrating against the BJP government which helped him to bring his party to power with huge majority in Chhattisgarh Vidhan Sabha election of 2018. He was the richest candidate in the 2013 Assembly Elections.

=== Cabinet Minister of Chhattisgarh ===
After the 2018 Chhattisgarh Legislative Assembly election resulted in a victory for the Indian National Congress. T.S. Singh Deo and Bhupesh Baghel were both considered candidates for the position of Chief Minister, but eventually Bhupesh Baghel- considered a significant OBC face in the state- was chosen over T.S. Singh Deo.

T.S. Singh Deo was made a cabinet minister in the Baghel ministry, holding five portfolios- Health and Family Welfare, Medical Education, 20 Point Program Implementation, Commercial Taxes and panchayat and rural development.

=== Deputy Chief Minister ===
On the 28th of June, 2023, T.S. Singh Deo was made Deputy Chief Minister of Chhattisgarh in the Baghel ministry, ahead of the 2023 Chhattisgarh Legislative Assembly elections of the same year.

== Electoral performances ==
Year	Legislative Assembly	Constituency	Margin	Result	Party	Post
2008	2nd	Ambikapur	948	Won	Indian National Congress	MLA
2013	3rd	Ambikapur	19,558	Won	Indian National Congress	Leader of the Opposition
2018	4th	Ambikapur	39,624	Won	Indian National Congress	Cabinet Minister and Deputy Chief Minister of Chhattisgarh
2023	5th	Ambikapur	-94	Lost	Indian National Congress	
