= 3rd Chhattisgarh Assembly =

3rd Legislative Assembly of Chhattisgarh

←	2nd Assembly	4th Assembly	→

Overview
- Legislative body: Chhattisgarh Legislative Assembly
- Election: 2008 Chhattisgarh Legislative Assembly election
- Government: Bharatiya Janata Party
- Opposition: Indian National Congress
- Members: 90
- Speaker: Dharamlal Kaushik, BJP
- Deputy Speaker: Narayan Chandel, BJP
- Leader of the House: Raman Singh, BJP
- Leader of the Opposition: Ravindra Choubey, INC
- Party control: Bharatiya Janata Party

The Third Legislative Assembly of Chhattisgarh was constituted after the 2008 Chhattisgarh Legislative Assembly elections which were concluded in November 2008 and the results were declared on 8 December 2008. Incumbent ruling party BJP and Chief Minister Raman Singh retained the majority in assembly and formed government consequently for the second time.

== Party wise distribution of seats ==

Party	No. MLAs	Leader of party in assembly	Leader's constituency
Bharatiya Janata Party	50	Raman Singh	Rajnandgaon
Indian National Congress	38	Ajit Jogi	Marwahi
Bahujan Samaj Party	2	Saurabh Singh	Akaltara

== See also ==
- Chhattisgarh Legislative Assembly
- 2013 Chhattisgarh Legislative Assembly election
