= Chhattisgarh Lok Sewa Guarantee Act, 2011 =

Chhattisgarh Lok Sewa Guarantee Act, 2011 is law enacted by Government of Chhattisgarh in 2011 that ensures the delivery of certain public services to citizens by the state government, local bodies, public authorities or agencies within the stipulated time and to fix the liabilities of persons responsible for delivery of such services in the event of default.
