= Chhattisgarh State Medicinal Plant Board =

State agency of Chhattisgarh, India

Chhattisgarh State Medicinal Plant Board is a state agency of Government of Chhattisgarh that acts as a coordinating and facilitating body for herbal related activities in Chhattisgarh state. It was set up in 2004. It was established to help the state government make policies for the conservation, promotion, processing and marketing of medicinal plants. It also works to coordinate different institutions in this field. Its work includes research on medicinal plants, surveys of medicinal plant resources, studying their demand and supply, and getting assistance from national and international institutions.

In 2021, the Chhattisgarh State Medicinal Plant Board was renamed as the ‘Chhattisgarh Adivasi Sthaniya Swasthya Parampara Avam Aushadhi Padap Board’ (Chhattisgarh Tribal Local Health Tradition and Medicinal Plant Board)
