= Lakhan Lal Dewangan =

Indian politician

Minister of Commerce and Industry, Government of Chhattisgarh
- Incumbent
- Assumed office 22 December 2023
- Chief Minister: Vishnu Deo Sai
- Preceded by: Kawasi Lakhma

Minister of Labour, Government of Chhattisgarh
- Incumbent
- Assumed office 22 December 2023
- Chief Minister: Vishnu Deo Sai
- Preceded by: Shiv Kumar Dahariya

Member of Chhattisgarh Legislative Assembly
- Incumbent
- Assumed office 3 December 2023
- Preceded by: Jai Singh Agrawal
- Constituency: Korba
- In office 8 December 2013 – 11 December 2018
- Preceded by: Bodhram Kanwar
- Succeeded by: Purushottam Kanwar
- Constituency: Katghora

Vice President, Bharatiya Janata Party, Chhattisgarh
- Incumbent
- Assumed office 29 September 2020
- President: Vishnudeo Sai; Arun Sao; Kiran Singh Deo

Parliamentary secretary for Ministry of Food, Civil Supply and Consumer Protection, Government of Chhattisgarh
- In office 23 May 2015 – 11 December 2018
- Minister: Punnulal Mohle
- Preceded by: Dr. Siyaram Sahu
- Succeeded by: Kunwar Singh Nishad

Mayor, Korba Municipal Corporation
- In office 16 January 2005 – 11 January 2010
- Preceded by: Shyam Kanwar
- Succeeded by: Jogesh Lamba

Personal details
- Born: 12 April 1962 (age 64) Korba, Madhya Pradesh, India (now in Chhattisgarh, India)
- Party: Bharatiya Janata Party
- Parent: Tulsi Ram Dewangan (Father)
- Education: Secondary School Certificate
- Profession: Agriculture, Business

Lakhan Lal Dewangan (born 12 April 1962) is an Indian politician serving as Minister of Commerce And Industry, Labour in Government of Chhattisgarh and represents Korba as MLA. He is former Parliamentary secretary (Minister of State rank) in Government of Chhattisgarh. On 29 September 2020, he was appointed as Vice President of Bharatiya Janata Party, Chhattisgarh.

== Political career ==
Lakhan Lal Dewangan was first elected as Mayor of Korba Municipal Corporation in 2005. On 8 December 2013, Dewangan became Member of Chhattisgarh Legislative Assembly from Katghora Constituency by defeating Bodhram Kanwar of Indian National Congress, a six term MLA from same seat by 13,130 votes and became Parliamentary secretary (Minister of State rank) for Food, Civil Supply, Consumer Protection, Village Industry, Planning, Economic and Statistics in Raman Singh Third ministry. Again, Dewangan contested the 2018 Assembly election against Purushottam Kanwar (INC) for Katghora but lost to Kanwar by 11,511 votes. In the 2023 Assembly election, he was fielded from Korba against 3 term MLA and incumbent Revenue Minister Jai Singh Agrawal and defeated him by huge margin of 25,629 votes and was sworn in as Cabinet Minister in Vishnudeo Sai ministry.
