= Tapkara Assembly constituency =

Constituency of the Chhattisgarh legislative assembly in India

Tapkara
- Former constituency for the Chhattisgarh Legislative Assembly

Constituency details
- Country: India
- Region: Central India
- State: Chhattisgarh
- Established: 2003
- Abolished: 2008
- Total electors: 117,163

Tapkara Assembly constituency was an assembly constituency in the India state of Chhattisgarh.

== Members of the Legislative Assembly ==
Election	Member	Party
2003	Bharat Sai	Bharatiya Janata Party

== Election results ==
=== Assembly Election 2003 ===
2003 Chhattisgarh Legislative Assembly election : Tapkara
Party	Candidate	Votes	%	±%
BJP	Bharat Sai	42,213	48.43%	New
INC	Mohan Sai	28,622	32.84%	New
Independent	Jolpholhem	8,284	9.50%	New
BSP	Theodor	3,982	4.57%	New
NCP	Meghnath Sai	2,234	2.56%	New
JMM	Parmanand	1,823	2.09%	New
Margin of victory		13,591	15.59%	
Turnout		87,158	74.39%	
Registered electors		117,163		
BJP win (new seat)				
