= 2nd Chhattisgarh Assembly =

2nd Legislative Assembly of Chhattisgarh

←	1st Assembly	3rd Assembly	→

Overview
- Legislative body: Chhattisgarh Legislative Assembly
- Election: 2003 Chhattisgarh Legislative Assembly election
- Government: Bharatiya Janata Party
- Opposition: Indian National Congress
- Members: 90
- Speaker: Prem Prakash Pandey, BJP
- Deputy Speaker: Badridhar Deewan, BJP
- Leader of the House: Raman Singh, BJP
- Leader of the Opposition: Mahendra Karma, INC
- Party control: Bharatiya Janata Party

The Second Legislative Assembly of Chhattisgarh was constituted after the 2003 Chhattisgarh Legislative Assembly elections which were concluded in November 2003 and the results were declared on December 2003. This is first time in Chhattisgarh BJP made his government after separation of Madhya Pradesh and BJP choose Dr. Raman Singh as their Chief minister.

== Party wise distribution of seats ==

Party	No. MLAs	Leader of party in assembly	Leader's constituency
Bharatiya Janata Party	50	Raman Singh	Rajnandgaon
Indian National Congress	37	Ajit Jogi	Marwahi
Bahujan Samaj Party	2	Kamda Jolhe	Sarangarh
Nationalist Congress Party	1	Nobel Kumar Verma	Chandrapur

== See also ==
- Chhattisgarh Legislative Assembly
- 2008 Chhattisgarh Legislative Assembly election
