= Raipur City North Assembly constituency =

Legislative Assembly constituency in Chhattisgarh State, India

Coordinates: 21.32°N 81.63°E

Raipur Nagar Uttar
- Constituency No. 50 for the Chhattisgarh Legislative Assembly

Constituency details
- Country: India
- Region: Central India
- State: Chhattisgarh
- District: Raipur
- Lok Sabha constituency: Raipur
- Established: 2008
- Total electors: 202,204
- Reservation: None

Member of Legislative Assembly
- 6th Chhattisgarh Legislative Assembly
- Incumbent Purandar Mishra
- Party: Bharatiya Janata Party
- Elected year: 2023

Raipur City North also known as Raipur Nagar Uttar Legislative Assembly constituency is one of the 90 Legislative Assembly constituencies of Chhattisgarh state in India. The seat was formed after the passing of the Delimitation of Parliamentary & Assembly Constituencies Order - 2008. It is part of Raipur district.

== Members of the Legislative Assembly ==
Year	Member	Party
Until 2008: Constituency did not exist
2008	Kuldeep Juneja	Indian National Congress
2013	Shrichand Sundrani	Bharatiya Janata Party
2018	Kuldeep Juneja	Indian National Congress
2023	Purandar Mishra	Bharatiya Janata Party

== Election results ==
=== 2023 ===
Chhattisgarh Legislative Assembly Election, 2023: Raipur City North
Party	Candidate	Votes	%	±%
BJP	Purandar Mishra	54,279	48.26	+8.72
INC	Kuldeep Singh Juneja	31,225	27.76	−26.64
Independent	Ajit Kukreja	22,939	20.39	New
NOTA	None of the Above	872	0.78	+0.14
Majority		23,054	20.50	+5.64
Turnout		112,478	55.63	−4.65
BJP gain from INC		Swing		

=== 2018 ===
Chhattisgarh Legislative Assembly Election, 2018: Raipur City North
Party	Candidate	Votes	%	±%
INC	Kuldeep Juneja	59,843	54.40	
BJP	Shri Chand Sundrani	43,502	39.54	
JCC	Amar Gidwani	2,510	2.28	
NOTA	None of the Above	705	0.64	
Majority		16,341	14.86	
Turnout		110,015	60.28	
INC gain from BJP		Swing		

== See also ==
- List of constituencies of the Chhattisgarh Legislative Assembly
- Raipur district
