= Ravindra Choubey =

Indian politician

Minister of Parliamentary Affairs, Government of Chhattisgarh
- In office 25 December 2018 - 3 December 2023
- Chief Minister: Bhupesh Baghel
- Preceded by: Ajay Chandrakar
- Succeeded by: Brijmohan Agrawal

Minister of Agriculture, Animal Husbandry, Fisheries, Ayacut Government of Chhattisgarh
- In office 25 December 2018 - 3 December 2023
- Chief Minister: Bhupesh Baghel
- Preceded by: Brijmohan Agrawal
- Succeeded by: Ramvichar Netam

Minister of Rural Development Government of Chhattisgarh
- In office 21 July 2022 - 3 December 2023
- Chief Minister: Bhupesh Baghel
- Preceded by: T. S. Singh Deo
- Succeeded by: Vijay Sharma

Minister of Water Resources Government of Chhattisgarh
- In office 25 December 2018 - 3 December 2023
- Chief Minister: Bhupesh Baghel
- Preceded by: Brijmohan Agrawal
- Succeeded by: Kedar Nath Kashyap

Leader of the Opposition Chhattisgarh Legislative Assembly
- In office 5 January 2009 – 11 December 2013
- Chief Minister: Raman Singh
- Preceded by: Mahendra Karma
- Succeeded by: T. S. Singh Deo

Member of Chhattisgarh Legislative Assembly
- In office 11 December 2018 – 3 December 2023
- Preceded by: Labhchand Bafna
- Succeeded by: Ishwar Sahu
- Constituency: Saja
- In office 2003–2013
- Preceded by: constituency created
- Succeeded by: Labhchand Bafna
- Constituency: Saja

Member of Madhya Pradesh Legislative Assembly
- In office 1985–2003
- Preceded by: Kumari Devi Chaubey
- Constituency: Saja

Personal details
- Born: 28 May 1957 (age 69)
- Party: Indian National Congress
- Education: B.Sc, LL.B

Ravindra Choubey (born 28 May 1957) is an Indian politician and a member of Indian National Congress. He is former Minister of Agriculture and Parliamentary Affairs in Government of Chhattisgarh and was Leader of the Opposition in the Chhattisgarh Legislative Assembly from 2009 to 2013. He also served as Cabinet Minister under Digvijaya Singh and Ajit Jogi.

== Political career ==
He is former member of legislative assembly of Chhattisgarh from Saja. He lost election in 2023 against BJP's Ishwar Sahu.
