= Tank Ram Verma =

Indian politician

Cabinet Minister, Government of Chhattisgarh
- Incumbent
- Assumed office 22 December 2023
- Chief Minister: Vishnu Deo Sai
- Preceded by: Umesh Patel

Member of Chhattisgarh Legislative Assembly
- Incumbent
- Assumed office 3 December 2023
- Preceded by: Pramod Kumar Sharma
- Constituency: Baloda Bazar

Personal details
- Party: Bharatiya Janata Party
- Spouse: Kiran Verma
- Occupation: Politician

Tank Ram Verma is an Indian politician. He is the current Minister of Department of Revenue & Disaster Management, Rehabilitation, and Higher Education in Chhattisgarh. He won from Baloda Bazar Vidhan Sabha Constituency in 2023 Chhattisgarh Legislative Assembly elections.
