= Vijay Sharma (politician) =

Indian politician of Chhattisgarh

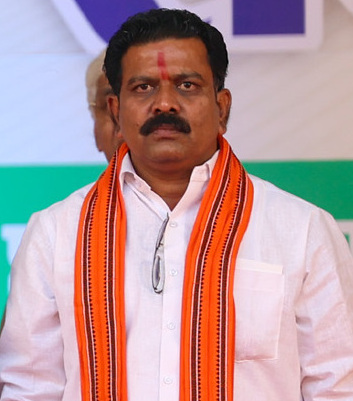

Deputy Chief Minister of Chhattisgarh
- Incumbent
- Assumed office 13 December 2023 Serving with Arun Sao
- Governor: Biswabhusan Harichandan; Ramen Deka
- Chief Minister: Vishnu Deo Sai
- Portfolios: Home and Jail, Panchayat and Rural Development, Science and Technology
- Preceded by: T. S. Singh Deo

Minister of Home Affairs and Jail Government of Chhattisgarh
- Incumbent
- Assumed office 22 December 2023
- Chief Minister: Vishnu Deo Sai
- Preceded by: Tamradhwaj Sahu

Panchayat and Rural Development Government of Chhattisgarh
- Incumbent
- Assumed office 22 December 2023
- Chief Minister: Vishnu Deo Sai
- Preceded by: Ravindra Choubey

Technical Education and Employment, Science and Technology Government of Chhattisgarh
- Incumbent
- Assumed office 22 December 2023
- Chief Minister: Vishnu Deo Sai
- Preceded by: Umesh Patel

Member of Chhattisgarh Legislative Assembly
- Incumbent
- Assumed office 3 December 2023
- Preceded by: Mohmmad Akbar
- Constituency: Kawardha

Personal details
- Born: Vijay Sharma; 19 July 1973 (age 53) Kawardha, Madhya Pradesh, India
- Party: Bharatiya Janata Party
- Spouse: Rashmi Vijay Sharma
- Children: 1
- Education: Pandit Ravishankar Shukla University, Raipur (M.Sc. Physics)

Vijay Sharma (born 19 July 1973) is an Indian politician. He currently serves as 2nd deputy chief minister of Chhattisgarh and is a member of Chhattisgarh Legislative Assembly. Sharma is currently the general secretary of Bharatiya Janata Party, Chhattisgarh, and was previously the party president of Bharatiya Janata Yuva Morcha, Chhattisgarh.

On 3 December 2023, Sharma was appointed as Deputy Chief Minister of Chhattisgarh along with Arun Sao in the Ministry of Vishnu Deo Sai. He also had responsibility of Home and Jail, Panchayat and Rural Development, Technical Education and Employment, Science, and Technology in the Government of Chhattisgarh.

Political offices
Preceded by T. S. Singh Deo	Deputy Chief Minister of Chhattisgarh; 13 December 2023	Incumbent
Preceded by Tamradhwaj Sahu	Home minister of Chhattisgarh; 22 December 2023	Incumbent
