= Kiran Singh Deo =

Indian politician

President of Bharatiya Janata Party, Chhattisgarh
- Incumbent
- Assumed office 21 December 2023
- President: J. P. Nadda; Nitin Nabin
- Preceded by: Arun Sao

Member of Chhattisgarh Legislative Assembly
- Incumbent
- Assumed office 3 December 2023
- Preceded by: Rekhchand Jain
- Constituency: Jagdalpur
- Majority: 29,834

Mayor of Jagdalpur Municipal Corporation
- In office 2009–2014
- Preceded by: Gitesh Mal
- Succeeded by: Jatin Jaiswal

Personal details
- Born: 17 September 1962 (age 64)
- Party: Bharatiya Janata Party
- Parent: Laxminarayan Deo (father)
- Education: LLB from Pandit Ravishankar Shukla University
- Profession: Advocate

Kiran Singh Deo (born 17 September 1962) is an Indian politician from Chhattisgarh. He is serving as a Member of Chhattisgarh Legislative Assembly from Jagdalpur Assembly constituency. He is the President of the Bharatiya Janata Party, Chhattisgarh.

== Early life and education ==
Singh Deo is from Jagadalpur, Bastar District, Chhattisgarh. He is son of Laxminarayan Deo. He completed his L. L. B. in 1989 at Pandit Ravishankar Shukla University, Raipur and is an advocate. He wife is a government teacher.

== Career ==
Singh Deo was chief of BJP Yuva Morcha in Jagdalpur from 2002 to 2005 and was also general secretary of Bharatiya Janata Party, Chhattisgarh from 2018 and 2022. He was elected as Mayor of Jagdalpur Municipal Corporation from 2009 to 2014.

He was elected from Jagdalpur Assembly constituency in 2023 Chhattisgarh Legislative Assembly election by defeating Jatin Jaiswal of Indian National Congress by a margin of 29,834 votes.

Party political offices
Preceded by Arun Sao	President of the Bharatiya Janata Party, Chhattisgarh; 2023–present	Incumbent
