= Laxmi Rajwade =

Indian politician (born 1992)

Minister of Women and Child Development Government of Chhattisgarh
- Incumbent
- Assumed office 22 December 2023
- Chief Minister: Vishnu Deo Sai
- Preceded by: Anila Bhediya

Member of the Chhattisgarh Legislative Assembly
- Incumbent
- Assumed office 3 December 2023
- Preceded by: Paras Nath Rajwade
- Constituency: Bhatgaon

Personal details
- Born: Laxmi Rajwade; 10 November 1992 (age 33)
- Party: Bharatiya Janata Party
- Spouse: Thakur Ram Rajwade
- Children: 2
- Occupation: Politician, Agriculture

Laxmi Rajwade (born 10 November 1992) is an Indian politician from Chhattisgarh. She is the current Minister of Women and Child Development in Chhattisgarh. She was elected MLA winning the 2023 Chhattisgarh Legislative Assembly election in December 2023 from Bhatgaon Assembly constituency.

== Early life and education ==
Rajwade is from Bhatgaon, Surajpur District, Chhattisgarh. She married Thakur Prasad Rajwade and they have two children. She passed Class 12 and could not complete her B.A. as she discontinued after second year in 2022 at a college affiliated to Sant Gahira Guru University, Ambikapur.

== Career ==
Rajwade is the youngest minister in Sai ministry. She won the 2023 Chhattisgarh Legislative Assembly election representing Bharatiya Janata Party from Bhatgaon Assembly constituency. She polled 105,162 votes and defeated her nearest rival, Paras Nath Rajwade of Indian National Congress, by a margin of 43,962 votes.
