= Guru Khushwant Saheb =

Indian politician (born 1989)

Cabinet Minister, Government of Chhattisgarh
- Incumbent
- Assumed office 20 August 2025
- Chief Minister: Vishnu Deo Sai
- Ministry and Departments: Skill development; Technical Education and Employment; Scheduled Caste Development

Member of the Chhattisgarh Legislative Assembly
- Incumbent
- Assumed office 3 December 2023
- Preceded by: Shivkumar Dahariya
- Constituency: Arang

Personal details
- Born: 27 March 1989 (age 37) Arang, Raipur district, Madhya Pradesh (now Chhattisgarh, India)
- Party: Bharatiya Janata Party
- Parent: Guru Baldas Saheb (father)
- Education: MATS University (M.Tech.)

Guru Khushwant Saheb (born 27 March 1989) is an Indian politician from Raipur Chhattisgarh. He is a member of the Chhattisgarh Legislative Assembly, representing the Arang Assembly constituency as a member of the Bharatiya Janata Party. In 2025, he was appointed as a Cabinet Minister in the Government of Chhattisgarh, holding the portfolios of Skill Development, Technical Education and Employment, and Scheduled Caste Development.

== Early life and education ==
Saheb is from Arang, Raipur District, Chhattisgarh. He is the son of Baldas Guru. He completed his M.Tech. in 2017 at MATS University, Gullu Arang, Raipur.

== Political life ==
Saheb won from Arang Assembly constituency representing the BJP in the 2023 Chhattisgarh Legislative Assembly election. Three months before the election he quit the Indian National Congress and joined the BJP. He polled 94,039 votes and defeated his nearest rival, Shivkumar Dahariya of the Indian National Congress, by a margin of 16,538 votes.
