= O. P. Choudhary =

Finance minister of Chhattisgarh

Om Prakash Choudhary
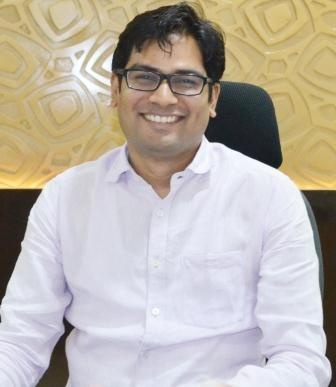

Minister for Finance, Commercial Tax Government of Chhattisgarh
- Incumbent
- Assumed office 22 December 2023
- Governor: B. Harichandan
- Chief Minister: Vishnu Deo Sai
- Preceded by: ▪︎ Bhupesh Baghel; ▪︎ Amarjeet Bhagat

Housing And Environment, Planning and Economics And Statistics Government of Chhattisgarh
- Incumbent
- Assumed office 22 December 2023
- Governor: Ramen Deka
- Chief Minister: Vishnu Deo Sai
- Preceded by: ▪︎ Kawasi Lakhma; ▪︎ Mohammad Akbar

Member of the Chhattisgarh Legislative Assembly
- Incumbent
- Assumed office 3 December 2023
- Preceded by: Prakash Naik
- Constituency: Raigarh

Personal details
- Born: 2 June 1981 (age 45) Bayang, Raigarh, Chhattisgarh
- Party: Bharatiya Janata Party
- Spouse: Dr. Aditi Patel.
- Education: Pandit Ravishankar Shukla University (B.Sc.)

Om Prakash Choudhary (born 2 June 1981) is an Indian politician serving as the Minister of Finance of Government of Chhattisgarh. He was former Indian Administrative Service Officer, who is currently serving as a member of the Chhattisgarh Legislative Assembly representing Raigarh since 2023. He previously served as the Collector of Raipur district.

== Personal life ==
Choudhary completed his education in various village government schools. He attained B.Sc. in Mathematics, Physics and Electronics from Pandit Ravishankar Shukla University and cleared the UPSC in 2005 batch to join the Indian Administrative Service becoming one of the youngest officers at the age of 22.

He was later posted as Municipal commissioner in the state capital Raipur, and became the Director of Public Relations.

Choudhary served as the Collector in Dantewada, Janjgir and Raipur districts, Until he resigned from the Indian Administrative Service in August 2018.

O. P. Choudhary was awarded with Prime Minister's Award for Excellence in Public Administration for his educational initiatives in Dantewada by the Government of India.

== Political career ==
Choudhary resigned as the collector of Raipur, and joined the Bharatiya Janata Party in 2018, in the presence of Raman Singh.

He unsuccessfully contested the 2018 Chhattisgarh Legislative Assembly election from Kharsia Assembly constituency and lost to Umesh Nandkumar Patel of the Indian National Congress.

In 2023, O. P. Choudhary became a Member of the Chhattisgarh Legislative Assembly, from Raigarh Assembly constituency with a margin of 64443 votes. He became the youngest minister in the Vishnudeo Sai ministry.

On 29 December 2023, he took charge as the Minister for Finance, Commercial Tax, Housing And Environment, Planning and Economics & Statistics.
