= COVID-19 pandemic in Chhattisgarh =

Ongoing COVID-19 viral pandemic in Chhattisgarh, India

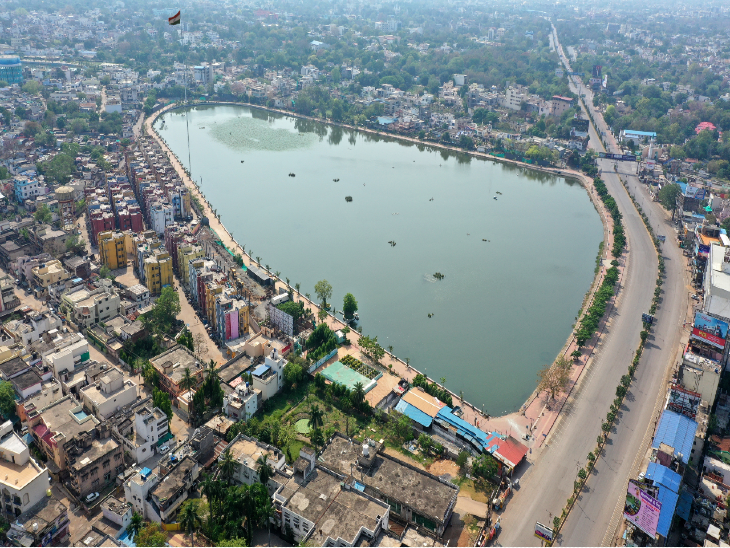
- Lockdown in Raipur due to Covid-19 Pandemic
- Disease: COVID-19
- Pathogen: SARS-CoV-2
- Location: Chhattisgarh, India
- First outbreak: Wuhan, Hubei, China
- Arrival date: 19 March 2020 (6 years, 5 months and 2 weeks)
- Confirmed cases: 1,512 (13 June 2020)
- Active cases: 875
- Recovered: 631 (13 June 2020)
- Deaths: 6 (10 June 2020)
- Fatality rate: 0.4%

The first case of the COVID-19 pandemic in India was reported on 30 January 2020, originating from China. Slowly, the pandemic spread to various states and union territories including the state of Chhattisgarh. The first case was recorded in this region on 19 March 2020.

== Timeline ==
- The first confirmed case of coronavirus in Chhattisgarh was reported on 19 March 2020 in Raipur, where a woman returning from London via Mumbai Airport was tested positive.

=== May 2020 ===
- As on 30 May, total number of cases in Chhattisgarh is 415, including 314 active cases 1 death and 100 recoveries.

=== June 2020 ===
- As on 3 June, total number of cases in Chhattisgarh was 564, including 433 active cases, 1 death and 130 recoveries.
- On 7 June, total number of cases in Chhattisgarh crossed 1000 mark. Total was 1073, including 803 active cases, 4 deaths and 266 recoveries.
- As on 12 June, total number of cases in Chhattisgarh was 1398, including 971 active cases, 6 deaths and 421 recoveries.
- As on 14 June, total number of cases in Chhattisgarh was 1550, including 913 active cases, 6 deaths and 631 cures.
- As on 20 June, total number of cases in Chhattisgarh was 2134, including 755 active cases, 11 deaths and 1368 recoveries.
- As on 23 June, total number of cases in Chhattisgarh was 2385, including 846 active cases, 12 fatalities and 1527 recoveries.

=== July 2020 ===
- As on 7 July, 99 corona-infected patients have been identified in the state Chhattisgarh. 1 from Rajnandgaon, 46 from Raipur, 3 from Balodabazar, 2 from Bijapur, 6 from Narayanpur, 1 from Dantewada, 1 from Durg, 1 from Bemetra, 19 from Janjgir Champa, 9 from Bilaspur, 5 from Raigarh, 9 from Bilaspur and Kanker 7 corona infected patients have been found.
- As on 9 July, Today 146 corona-infected patients have been identified in the state Chhattisgarh. Raipur 56, Narayanpur 38, Bijapur 13, Korba 9, Sarguja 6, Balrampur 5, Bilaspur 5, Janjgir 3, Bemetra 2, Kanker 2, Dantewada 2, Durg 1, Jashpur 1, Rajnadgaon 1, Kawardha 1 and Surajpur 1 Corona infected patients. At the same time, there are 761 active cases left in the state.
- As on 10 July, Today 140 corona infected patients have been identified in the state. 34 from Raipur, 22 from Narayanpur, 17 from Dantewada, 13 from Bilaspur, 10 from Rajnandgaon, 10 from Baloda Bazar, 9 from Sarguja, 7 from Raigad, 3 from Durg, 3 from Balot, 3 from Janjgir Champa, 2 from Balrampur 2 corona infected patients have been found from Kondagaon, 2 from another state, 1 from Korba, 1 from Bemetra and 1 from Mahasamund.
- As on 12 July, total number of cases in Chhattisgarh was 4081, including 909 active cases, 19 fatalities and 3153 recoveries.
- As on 13 July, total COVID-19 confirm case in Chhattisgarh was 4265, COVID-19 active case-1044, Total recovered/discharge COVID-19 patients-3202
- As on 17 July, total COVID-19 confirm case was 4754, COVID-19 active case 1282 and 3451 recovered/discharge patients. 21 have died from the virus.
- As on 21 July, total number of cases in Chhattisgarh was 5731, including 1588 active cases, 29 fatalities and 4114 recoveries.
- As of 27 July, total number of cases in Chhattisgarh was 7613, including 2626 active cases, 43 fatalities and 4944 recoveries. Out of total population of 3.2 crores, 2.1 lacs (0.65%) are under surveillance.

=== August 2020 ===
- As on 3 August, total number of cases in Chhattisgarh is 9820, including 2503 active cases, 61 fatalities and 7256 recoveries.
- On 4 August, total number of cases in Chhattisgarh crossed grim milestone of 10000 mark.
- As on 8 August, total number of cases was 11406, including 3002 active cases, 87 deaths and 8317 recoveries.
- As on 11 August, total number of cases was 12985, including 3642 active cases, 104 deaths and 9239 cures.
- As on 14 August, total number of cases was 14559. This includes 4572 active cases, 130 deaths and 9857 cures.
- As on 19 August, total number of cases was 17585, including 6236 active cases, 164 deaths and 11185 recoveries.
- As on 25 August, total number of cases in the state was 23341, including 9388 active cases, 221 deaths and 13732 recoveries.
- As on 31 August, total number of cases was 31503. This includes 14207 active cases, 277 deaths and 16989 cures.

=== September 2020 ===
- As on 2 September, total number of cases in Chhattisgarh was 35683, including 17174 active cases, 299 fatalities and 18220 recoveries.
- As on 5 September, total number of cases was 43163, including 22320 active cases, 356 deaths and 20487 recoveries.
- On 8 September, total number of cases in Chhattisgarh crossed 50000.
- As on 10 September, total number of cases was 55680, including 29332 active cases, 25855 recoveries and 493 deaths.
- As on 16 September, total number of cases was 73966, including 37470 active cases, 35885 cures and 611 deaths.
- On 17 September, total number of cases in Chhattisgarh surpassed 100000 mark.
- As on 21 September, total number of cases was 88181, including 37927 active cases, 690 deaths and 49564 recoveries.
- As on 28 September, total number of cases was 108458, including 33044 active cases, 74537 recoveries and 877 deaths.

=== October 2020 ===
- As on 2 October, total number of cases in Chhattisgarh was 118790, including 29693 active cases, 1002 fatalities and 88095 recoveries.
- As on 5 October, total number of cases was 126005, including 27857 active cases, 97067 recoveries and 1081 fatalities.
- As on 10 October, total number of cases was 140258, including 27369 active cases, 111654 recoveries and 1235 deaths.
- As on 19 October, total number of cases was 162772, including 25979 active cases, 135259 recoveries and 1534 fatalities.
- As on 27 October, total number of cases was 179654, including 21693 active cases, 156080 cures and 1881 fatalities.

=== November 2020 ===
- As on 8 November, total number of cases in Chhattisgarh was 200937, including 22361 active cases, 2447 fatalities and 176129 recoveries. On 8 November, total number of cases in Chhattisgarh crossed grim milestone of 200000 mark.
- As on 14 November, total number of cases was 210004, including 19275 active cases, 188167 cures and 2562 fatalities.
- As on 23 November, total number of cases was 225497, including 21926 active cases, 200825 recoveries and 2746 deaths.

=== December 2020 ===
- As on 2 December, total number of cases in Chhattisgarh was 240863, including 19479 active cases, 2919 fatalities and 218195 recoveries.
- As on 7 December, total number of cases was 248232, including 19589 active cases, 3010 fatalities and 225633 recoveries.
- As on 16 December, total number of cases was 261901, including 17468 active cases, 241288 recoveries and 3045 deaths.
- As on 28 December, total number of cases was 276337, including 12962 active cases, 260056 recoveries and 3319 fatalities.
- As on 31 December, total number of cases was 279575, including 11435 active cases, 264769 recoveries and 3371 fatalities.

=== January 2021 ===
- As on 5 January, total number of cases in Chhattisgarh was 284536, including 9111 active cases, 3437 fatalities and 271988 recoveries.
- As on 10 January, total number of cases was 289231, including 8967 active cases, 276774 recoveries and 3490 fatalities.
- As on 21 January, total number of cases was 265509, including 5639 active cases, 286277 recoveries and 3593 deaths.

=== February 2021 ===
- As on 1 February, total number of cases in Chhattisgarh was 305689, including 4124 active cases, 297859 cures and 3706 fatalities.
- As on 13 February, total number of cases was 308930, including 3255 active cases, 301904 cures and 3771 deaths.
- As on 20 February, total number of cases was 310732, including 3102 active cases, 303835 recoveries and 3795 deaths.

=== March 2021 ===
- As on 6 March, total number of cases in Chhattisgarh was 314098, including 2721 active cases, 307522 cures and 3855 deaths.
- As on 14 March, total number of cases was 317329, including 4006 active cases, 309433 recoveries and 3890 deaths.
- As on 29 March, total number of cases in the state was 341516, including 20181 active cases, 317239 recoveries and 4096 fatalities.

=== April 2021 ===
- As on 4 April, total number of cases in Chhattisgarh was 369046, including 38450 active cases, 326277 cures and 4319 deaths.
- As on 8 April, total number of cases was 407231, including 68125 active cases, 334543 cures and 4563 deaths.
- As on 11 April, total number of cases was 443297, including 90277 active cases, 348121 recoveries and 4899 fatalities.
- As on 20 April, total number of cases was 574299, including 125688 active cases, 442337 recoveries and 6274 deaths.

=== May 2021 ===
- As on 4 May, total number of cases in Chhattisgarh was 787486, including 124459 active cases, 653542 cures and 9485 deaths.
- As on 10 May, total number of cases was 863343, including 125104 active cases, 727497 recoveries and 10742 deaths.
- As on 18 May, total number of cases was 925531, including 90382 active cases, 823113 recoveries and 12036 have died from the virus.
- As on 25 May, total number of cases is 956715, including 56474 active cases, 887518 cures and 12723 fatalities.

=== June 2021 ===
- As on 17 June, total number of cases in Chhattisgarh was 989335, including 10682 active cases, 965292 cures and 13361 deaths.
- As on 23 June, total number of cases was 9920610, including 7622 active cases, 971032 cures and 13407 deaths.

=== July 2021 ===
- As on 19 July, total number of cases in Chhattisgarh is 999853, including 3719 active cases, 982638 cures and 13496 deaths.

=== August 2021 ===
- As on 28 August, total number of cases in Chhattisgarh is 1004379, including 510 active cases, 990314 cures and 13555 deaths.

=== September 2021 ===
- As on 23 September, total number of cases in Chhattisgarh was 1005146, including 300 active cases, 991283 cures and 13563 deaths.
- As on 25 September, total number of cases is 1005202, including 300 active cases, 991339 recoveries and 13563 deaths.

=== Oct to Dec 2021 ===
- As on 8 October, total number of cases in Chhattisgarh was 1005485, including 211 active cases, 991705 recoveries and 13569 deaths.
- As on 23 October, total number of cases was 1005827, including 230 active cases, 992025 cures and 13572 deaths.
- As on 2 November, total number of cases was 1006052, including 316 active cases, 992159 recoveries and 13577 fatalities.
- As on 14 December, total number of cases was 1007244, including 377 active cases, 993273 cures and 13594 fatalities.
- As on 29 December, total number of cases was 1007741, including 393 active cases, 993748 cures and 13600 deaths.

=== Jan to Mar 2022 ===
- As on 9 January, total number of cases in Chhattisgarh was 1020811, including 13066 active cases, 994132 recoveries and 13613 deaths.
- As on 16 January, total number of cases is 1055753, including 31939 active cases, 1009967 recoveries and 13647 deaths.
- As on 25 January, total number of cases is 1105132, including 30254 active cases, 1061109 recoveries and 13769 deaths.
- As on 11 February, total number of cases is 1144940, including 8464 active cases, 1122488 cures and 13988 deaths.
- As on 21 February, total number of cases is 1149666, including 2887 active cases, 1132757 recoveries and 14022 fatal cases.
- As on 19 March, total number of cases is 1151904, including 175 active cases, 1137695 recoveries and 14034 deaths.

=== April to June 2022 ===
- As on 13 April, total number of cases in Chhattisgarh was 1152214, including 32 active cases, 1138148 recoveries and 14034 deaths.
- As on 25 April, total number of cases was 1152241, including 23 active cases, 1138184 recoveries and 14034 deaths.
- As on 2 May, total number of cases was 1152274, including 38 active cases, 1138202 cures and 14034 deaths.
- As on 12 May, total number of cases was 1152324, including 30 active cases, 1138260 recoveries and 14034 deaths.
- As on 28 May, total number of cases was 1152418, including 51 active cases, 1138333 cures and 14034 deaths. There hasn't been any Covid related death in the region in around 2 months.
- As on 10 June, total number of cases was 1152589, including 102 active cases, 1138452 cures and 14035 fatalities.
- As on 22 June, total number of cases was 1153356, including 585 active cases, 1138736 recoveries and 14035 deaths.

=== July to September 2022 ===
- As on 16 July, total number of cases in Chhattisgarh was 1158658, including 2656 active cases, 1141957 recoveries and 14045 deaths.
- As on 30 August, total number of cases was 1173444, including 1107 active cases, 1158129 cures and 14108 deaths.
- As on 7 September, total number of cases was 1174476, including 735 active cases, 1159595 recoveries and 14116 fatal cases.
- As on 17 September, total number of cases was 1175430, including 676 active cases, 1160631 recoveries and 14123 fatalities.
- As on 26 October, total number of cases was 1177416, including 256 active cases, 1163117 recoveries and 14141 deaths.

== COVID-19 Vaccines with Approval for Emergency or Conditional Usage ==
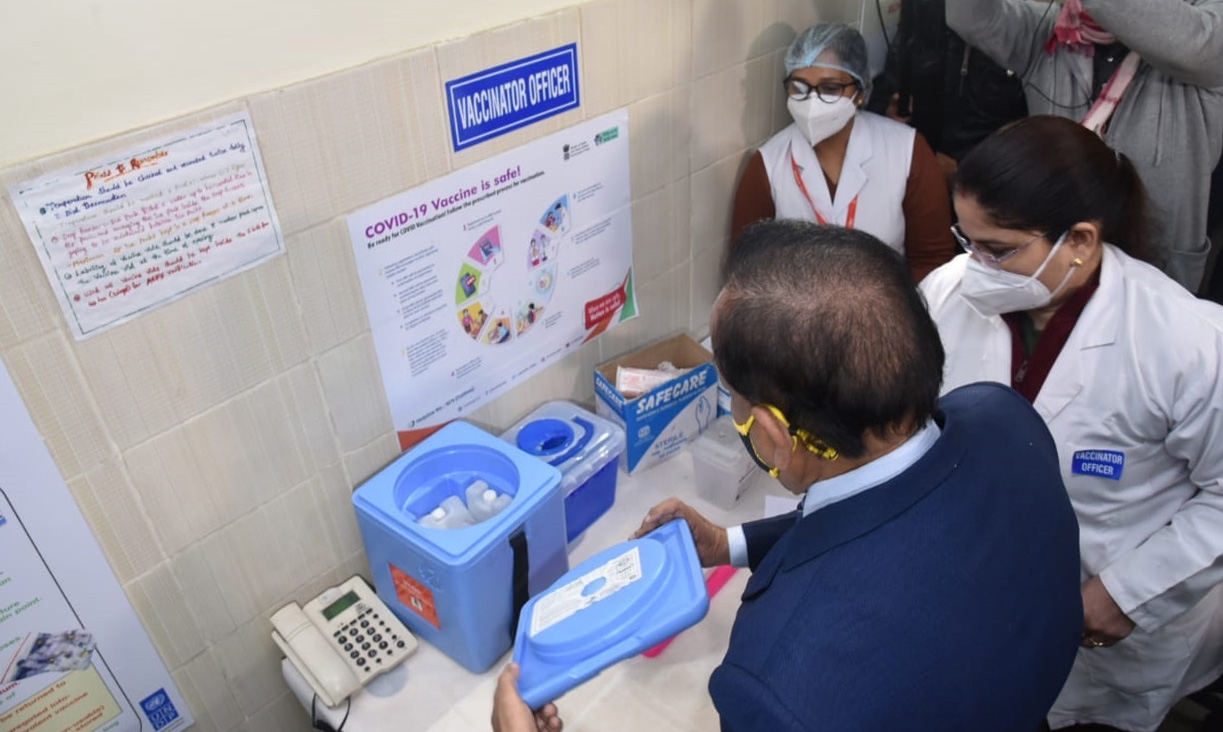
Union Minister for Health & Family Welfare, Dr. Harsh Vardhan visiting the GTB Hospital, Shahdara to review the preparedness of Dry Run of COVID-19 vaccine, in Delhi on January 02, 2021.

=== Covishield ===
On 1 January 2021, the Drug Controller General of India, approved the emergency or conditional use of AstraZeneca's COVID-19 vaccine AZD1222 (marketed as Covishield). Covishield is developed by the University of Oxford and its spin-out company, Vaccitech. It's a viral vector vaccine based on replication-deficient Adenovirus that causes cold in Chimpanzees. It can be stored, transported and handled at normal refrigerated conditions (two-eight degrees Celsius/ 36-46 degrees Fahrenheit). It has a shelf-life of at least six months.

On 12 January 2021 first batches of Covishield vaccine was despatched from the Serum Institute of India.

=== Covaxin ===
On 2 January 2021, BBV152 (marketed as Covaxin), first indigenous vaccine, developed by Bharat Biotech in association with the Indian Council of Medical Research and National Institute of Virology received approval from the Drug Controller General of India for its emergency or conditional usage.

On 14 January 2021 first batches of Covaxin vaccine was despatched from the Bharat Biotech, albeit it was still in the third phase of testing.

=== Others ===
On 19 May 2021, Dr Reddy's Labs received Emergency Use Authorisation for anti-COVID drug 2-DG. On 21 February 2022, Drugs Controller General of India granted approval to Biological E's COVID-19 vaccine Corbevax, that can be used for children between 12 and 18 years of age.

On 21 October 2021, India completed administering of one billion Covid vaccines in the country.

On 8 January 2022, India crossed 1.5 billion Covid vaccines milestone in the country.

On 19 February 2022, India crossed 1.75 billion Covid vaccines milestone in the country.

== See also ==
- COVID-19 pandemic in India
- COVID-19 pandemic
