= Korba Assembly constituency =

Legislative Assembly constituency in Chhattisgarh State, India

Coordinates: 22.34°N 82.74°E

Korba
- Constituency No. 21 for the Chhattisgarh Legislative Assembly

Constituency details
- Country: India
- Region: Central India
- State: Chhattisgarh
- District: Korba
- Lok Sabha constituency: Korba
- Established: 2008
- Total electors: 256,051
- Reservation: None

Member of Legislative Assembly
- 6th Chhattisgarh Legislative Assembly
- Incumbent Lakhan Lal Dewangan
- Party: Bharatiya Janata Party
- Elected year: 2023

Korba is one of the 90 Legislative Assembly constituencies of Chhattisgarh state in India. It comprises parts of Korba tehsil and Katghora tehsil, in Korba district.

== Members of the Legislative Assembly ==
Election	Name	Party
Until 2008: Constituency did not exist
2008	Jai Singh Agrawal	Indian National Congress
2013	Jai Singh Agrawal	Indian National Congress
2018	Jai Singh Agrawal	Indian National Congress
2023	Lakhan Lal Dewangan	Bharatiya Janata Party

== Election results ==
=== 2023 ===
2023 Chhattisgarh Legislative Assembly election: Korba
Party	Candidate	Votes	%	±%
BJP	Lakhan Lal Dewangan	92,029	53.74	+17.54
INC	Jai Singh Agrawal	66,400	38.77	−4.83
NOTA	None of the Above	972	0.57	−0.06
Majority		25629	14.97	+10.46
Turnout		171246	76.05	+4.45
BJP gain from INC		Swing	+17.54	

== See also ==
- List of constituencies of the Chhattisgarh Legislative Assembly
- Korba district
