= Purandar Mishra =

Indian politician

Purandar Mishra (born 3 January 1959) is an Indian politician from Chhattisgarh. He is an MLA from Raipur City North Assembly constituency in Raipur District. He won the 2023 Chhattisgarh Legislative Assembly election, representing the Bharatiya Janata Party. He is the only Odisha native in the 6th Chhattisgarh Assembly.

== Early life and education ==
Mishra is from Basna, Raipur District, Chhattisgarh. His late father, Gautam Mishra, was a farmer. He completed his D.L.L.M in 1996 at S. R. Law College, Sambalpur and later did his L. L. B. In 1992 at Balangeer Law College. Earlier, he also graduated in arts in 1981.

== Career ==
Mishra won from Raipur City North Assembly constituency representing the Bharatiya Janata Party in the 2023 Chhattisgarh Legislative Assembly election. He polled 54,279 votes and defeated his nearest rival, Kuldeep Singh Juneja of the Indian National Congress, by a margin of 23,054 votes.

Mishra is actively engaged in the social networks of Odia communities. He serves as the president of the Greater Odia Samaj in Chhattisgarh state and is the chief patron of the World Odisha Society, Chhattisgarh branch. He is also credited with contributing to the development of the largest Jagannath temple in Chhattisgarh, located in Gayatri Nagar, Raipur, within his constituency.
