= Shyam Bihari Jaiswal =

Indian politician

Minister of Health and Family Welfare Minister of Medical Education, Government of Chhattisgarh
- Incumbent
- Assumed office 22 December 2023
- Chief Minister: Vishnu Deo Sai
- Preceded by: T. S. Singh Deo

Member of Chhattisgarh Legislative Assembly
- Incumbent
- Assumed office 3 December 2023
- Preceded by: Dr. Vinay Jaiswal
- In office 8 December 2013 – 11 December 2018
- Preceded by: Deepak Kumar Patel
- Succeeded by: Dr. Vinay Jaiswal
- Constituency: Manendragarh

Personal details
- Born: Shyam Bihari Jaiswal; 1 October 1976 (age 49) Ratanpur, Koriya, Chhattisgarh, India
- Party: Bharatiya Janata Party

Shyam Bihari Jaiswal (born 1 October 1976) is an Indian politician. He has been serving as the Minister of Health and Family Welfare and Minister of Medical Education in the Ministry of Vishnudeo Sai since 2023. He represents Manendragarh in the legislative assembly of Chhattisgarh.
