= Kunkuri Assembly constituency =

Legislative Assembly constituency in Chhattisgarh State, India

Coordinates: 22.74°N 83.95°E

Kunkuri
- Constituency No. 13 for the Chhattisgarh Legislative Assembly

Constituency details
- Country: India
- Region: Central India
- State: Chhattisgarh
- District: Jashpur
- Lok Sabha constituency: Raigarh
- Established: 2008
- Total electors: 205,625
- Reservation: ST

Member of Legislative Assembly
- 6th Chhattisgarh Legislative Assembly
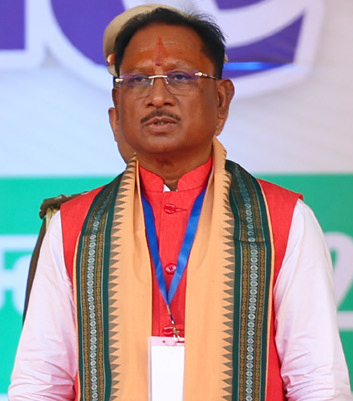
- Incumbent Vishnu Deo Sai; Chief Minister of Chhattisgarh
- Party: BJP
- Elected year: 2023

Kunkuri is one of the 90 Legislative Assembly constituencies of Chhattisgarh state in India.

It encompasses the entire Kunkuri tehsil of Jashpur district, and is reserved for candidates belonging to the Scheduled Tribes. Chief minister of state represents this constituency.

== Members of the Legislative Assembly ==
Year	Name	Party
Until 2008: Constituency did not exist
2008	Bharat Sai	Bharatiya Janata Party
2013	Rohit Kumar Sai	Bharatiya Janata Party
2018	U. D. Minj	Indian National Congress
2023	Vishnu Deo Sai	Bharatiya Janata Party

== Election results ==
=== 2023 ===
2023 Chhattisgarh Legislative Assembly election: Kunkuri
Party	Candidate	Votes	%	±%
BJP	Vishnu Deo Sai	87,604	54.9	▲11.58
INC	U.D. Minj	62,063	38.9	▼7.26
AAP	Leos Minj	1,945	1.14	▼0.08
Hamar Raj Party	Albert Minj	1749	1.10	New
NOTA	None of the Above	2,531	1.59	▲0.18
Majority		25,541	16	▲13.16
Turnout		1,59,560		
BJP gain from INC		Swing		

=== 2018 ===
Chhattisgarh Legislative Assembly Election, 2018: Kunkuri
Party	Candidate	Votes	%	±%
INC	U.D. Minj	69,896	46.16	
BJP	Bharat Sai	65,603	43.32	
NOTA	None of the Above	2,129	1.41	
Majority		4,293		
Turnout		1,51,431	77.90	
INC gain from BJP		Swing		

== See also ==
- List of constituencies of the Chhattisgarh Legislative Assembly
- Jashpur district
