= List of deputy chief ministers of Chhattisgarh =

Second most important member in State government

Deputy Chief Minister of Chhattisgarh

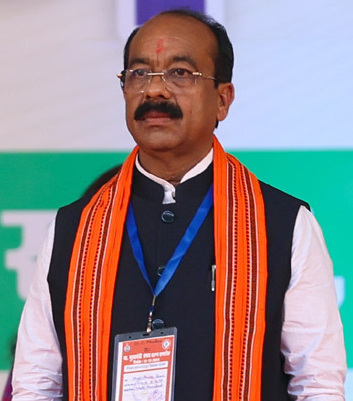
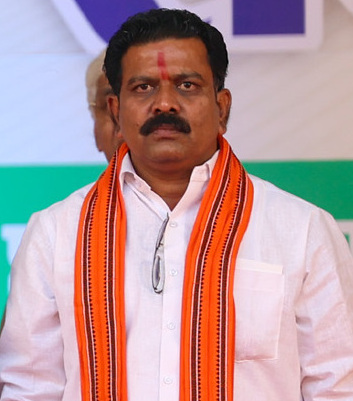
- Incumbent; Arun Sao; Vijay Sharma since 12 Dec 2023
- Government of Chhattisgarh
- Style: The Honourable (Formal); Mr. Deputy Chief Minister (Informal)
- Type: Deputy Head of Government
- Status: Deputy Leader of the Executive
- Abbreviation: DCM
- Member of: Cabinet; Chhattisgarh Legislative Assembly
- Reports to: Chief Minister of Chhattisgarh; Chhattisgarh Legislative Assembly
- Seat: Mahanadi Bhawan, Naya Raipur
- Nominator: Members of the Government of Chhattisgarh in Chhattisgarh Legislative Assembly
- Appointer: Governor of Chhattisgarh on the advice of the Chief Minister of Chhattisgarh
- Term length: At the confidence of the assembly Deputy Chief minister's term is for 5 years and is subject to no term limits.
- Precursor: Deputy Chief Minister of Madhya Pradesh
- Inaugural holder: T. S. Singh Deo
- Formation: 28 June 2023 (3 years ago)

The deputy chief minister of Chhattisgarh is a member of the Cabinet in the Government of Chhattisgarh. Not technically a constitutional office, it seldom carries any specific powers. The position of deputy chief minister is not explicitly defined or mentioned in the Constitution of India. However, the Supreme Court of India has stated that the appointment of deputy chief ministers is not unconstitutional. The court has clarified that a deputy chief minister, for all practical purposes, remains a minister in the council of ministers headed by the chief minister and does not draw a higher salary or perks compared to other ministers.During the absence of the chief minister, the deputy-chief minister may chair cabinet meetings and lead the assembly majority. Various deputy chief ministers have also taken the oath of secrecy in line with the one that chief minister takes. This oath has also sparked controversies.

== Predecessor ==
#	Name	Portrait	Constituency	Term of office			Chief Minister	Party
1	Virendra Kumar Sakhlecha		Jawad	30 July 1967	12 March 1969	1 year, 225 days	Govind Narayan Singh	Bharatiya Jana Sangh
2	Shiv Bhanu Singh Solanki		Dhar				Arjun Singh	Indian National Congress
3	Subhash Yadav		Kasrawad	1993	1998		Digvijaya Singh	Indian National Congress
4	Jamuna Devi		Kukshi	1998	2003		Digvijaya Singh	Indian National Congress

== List of deputy chief ministers ==
Colour key for parties
Bharatiya Janata Party
Indian National Congress

#	Portrait	Name	Constituency	Term of office			Assembly (election)	Chief Minister	Party
1		T. S. Singh Deo	Ambikapur	28 June 2023	13 December 2023	168 days	5th (2018 election)	Bhupesh Baghel	Indian National Congress
2		Arun Sao	Lormi	13 December 2023	Incumbent	2 years, 268 days	6th (2023 election)	Vishnu Deo Sai	Bharatiya Janata Party
2		Vijay Sharma	Kawardha	13 December 2023	Incumbent	2 years, 268 days	6th (2023 election)	Vishnu Deo Sai	Bharatiya Janata Party

== Statistics ==
List of deputy chief ministers by length of term

No.	Name	Party	Length of term	
No.	Name	Party	Longest continuous term	Total years of deputy chief ministership
1	Arun Sao	BJP	2 years, 268 days	2 years, 268 days
2	Vijay Sharma	BJP	2 years, 268 days	2 years, 268 days
3	T. S. Singh Deo	INC	168 days	168 days

== See also ==
- List of chief ministers of Chhattisgarh
- Chhattisgarh Legislative Assembly

== Oath as the state deputy chief minister ==
The deputy chief minister serves five years in the office. The following is the oath of the Deputy chief minister of state:

I, <Name of Deputy Chief Minister>, do swear in the name of God/solemnly affirm that I will bear true faith and allegiance to the Constitution of India as by law established, that I will uphold the sovereignty and integrity of India, that I will faithfully and conscientiously discharge my duties as a Minister for the State of () and that I will do right to all manner of people in accordance with the Constitution and the law without fear or favour, affection or ill-will.

Oath of Secrecy

"I, [Name], do swear in the name of God / solemnly affirm that I will not directly or indirectly communicate or reveal to any person or persons any matter which shall be brought under my consideration or shall become known to me as a Minister for the State of [Name of State] except as may be required for the due discharge of my duties as such Minister."Pad ki Shapath (Oath of Office) "Main, [DCM ka Naam], Ishwar ki shapath leta hoon / satyanishtha se pratigyan karta hoon ki main vidhi dwara sthapit Bharat ke Samvidhan ke prati sachi shraddha aur nishtha rakhunga. Main Bharat ki prabhuta aur akhandta akshunn rakhunga. Main [State ka Naam] ke Rajya ke Upa Mukhya Mantri ke roop mein apne kartavyon ka shraddhapoorvak aur shuddh antahkaran se nirvahan karunga, tatha main bhay ya pakshpat, anurag ya dwesh ke bina, sabhi prakar ke logon ke prati Samvidhan aur vidhi ke anusar nyay karunga." B. Gopniyata ki Shapath (Oath of Secrecy) "Main, [DCM ka Naam], Ishwar ki shapath leta hoon / satyanishtha se pratigyan karta hoon ki jo vishay [State ka Naam] ke Rajya ke Mukhya Mantri ke roop mein mere vichar ke liye laya jayega athva mujhe gyaat hoga, use kisi vyakti ya vyaktityon ko, tab ke sivay jab ki aise UpaMukhya Mantri ke roop mein apne kartavyon ke uchit nirvahan ke liye aisa karna apekshit ho, main pratyaksh (directly) ya apratyaksh (indirectly) roop mein sansuchit ya prakat nahi karunga."
