= Sushant Shukla =

Indian politician

Sushant Shukla (born 1983) is an Indian politician from Chhattisgarh. He is an MLA from Beltara Assembly constituency in Bilaspur district. He won the 2023 Chhattisgarh Legislative Assembly election, representing the Bharatiya Janata Party.

== Early life and education ==
Shukla is from Bilaspur, Chhattisgarh. He is the son of Hiramani Shukla. He passed Class 12 through open stream in 2018.

== Career ==
Shukla won from Beltara Assembly constituency representing the Bharatiya Janata Party in the 2023 Chhattisgarh Legislative Assembly election. He polled 79,528 votes and defeated his nearest rival, Vijay Kesarwani of the Indian National Congress, by a margin of 16,963 votes.
