= Arun Sao =

Deputy Chief Minister of Chhattisgarh

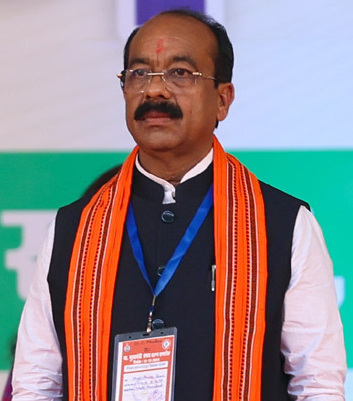

Deputy Chief Minister of Chhattisgarh
- Incumbent
- Assumed office 13 December 2023 Serving with Vijay Sharma
- Governor: B. Harichandan; Ramen Deka
- Chief Minister: Vishnudeo Sai
- Preceded by: T. S. Singh Deo

Minister of Public Works Department Government of Chhattisgarh
- Incumbent
- Assumed office 22 December 2023
- Chief Minister: Vishnu Deo Sai
- Preceded by: Tamradhwaj Sahu

Minister of Public Health Engineering Government of Chhattisgarh
- Incumbent
- Assumed office 22 December 2023
- Chief Minister: Vishnu Deo Sai
- Preceded by: Guru Rudra Kumar

Minister of Law & Legislative Affairs Government of Chhattisgarh
- Incumbent
- Assumed office 22 December 2023
- Chief Minister: Vishnu Deo Sai
- Preceded by: Ravindra Choubey

Minister of Urban Administration Government of Chhattisgarh
- Incumbent
- Assumed office 22 December 2023
- Chief Minister: Vishnu Deo Sai
- Preceded by: Shiv Kumar Dahariya

Member of the Chhattisgarh Legislative Assembly
- Incumbent
- Assumed office 3 December 2023
- Preceded by: Dharmjeet Singh Thakur
- Constituency: Lormi

President of Bharatiya Janata Party, Chhattisgarh
- In office 9 August 2022 – 6 December 2023
- Preceded by: Vishnudeo Sai
- Succeeded by: Kiran Singh Deo

Member of Parliament, Lok Sabha
- In office 23 May 2019 – 7 December 2023
- Preceded by: Lakhan Lal Sahu
- Succeeded by: Tokhan Sahu
- Constituency: Bilaspur

Personal details
- Born: 25 November 1968 (age 57) Jarhagaon, Chhattisgarh, India
- Party: Bharatiya Janata Party
- Spouse: Meena Sao
- Children: Amish Sao
- Education: Guru Ghasidas Vishwavidyalaya (BCom), (LL.B)

Arun Sao (pronounced [ərun sa:v]; born 25 November 1968) is an Indian politician, who is current 2nd Deputy Chief Minister of Chhattisgarh along with Vijay Sharma in the Ministry of Vishnudeo Sai in 6th Chhattisgarh Legislative Assembly since 2023 and currently holds charge of the Department of Urban Administration and Development, as well as the Sports and Youth Welfare Department of the state government. He represents Lormi Vidhan Sabha seat in legislative assembly of the Chhattisgarh. Earlier, he was elected to the 17th Lok Sabha, lower house of the Parliament of India from Bilaspur, Chhattisgarh in the 2019 Indian general election. He was the President of Bharatiya Janata Party, Chhattisgarh unit from August 2022 to December 2023.

Arun Sao is a graduate of S.N.G. College, Mungeli and K.R. Law College, Bilaspur. In 2001, Arun Sao practiced in the high court and served as a panel lawyer for the Chhattisgarh government in 2004 and for the government from 2005 to 2013 and deputy advocate general of Chhattisgarh High court from 2013 to 2018.

Political offices
Preceded by T. S. Singh Deo	Deputy Chief Minister of Chhattisgarh; 13 December 2023	Incumbent
Party political offices
Preceded by Vishnudeo Sai	President of the Bharatiya Janata Party Chhattisgarh; August 2022–December 2023	Succeeded by Kiran Singh Deo
Lok Sabha
Preceded by Lakhan Lal Sahu	Member of Parliament for Bilaspur; 2019–2023	Succeeded by Tokhan Sahu
