= Government of Chhattisgarh =

Indian state government

- Seat of Government: Raipur

Legislative branch
- Assembly: Chhattisgarh Legislative Assembly
- Speaker: Dr. Raman Singh
- Members in Assembly: 90

Executive branch
- Governor: Ramen Deka
- Chief Minister: Vishnudeo Sai
- Deputy Chief Minister: Arun Sao; Vijay Sharma
- Chief Secretary: Vikas Sheel, IAS

Judiciary
- High Court: Chhattisgarh High Court
- Chief Justice: Ramesh Sinha

Government of Chhattisgarh also known as the State Government of Chhattisgarh, or locally as State Government, is the supreme governing authority of the Indian state of Chhattisgarh and its 33 districts. It consists of an executive, led by the Governor of Chhattisgarh, a judiciary and a legislative branch.

Like other states in India, the head of state of Chhattisgarh is the governor, appointed by the President of India on the advice of the central government. The post of governor is largely ceremonial. The chief minister is the elected head of government and is vested with most of the executive powers. Raipur is the capital of Chhattisgarh, and houses the Chhattisgarh Vidhan Sabha (Legislative Assembly) and the secretariat. The Chhattisgarh High Court, located in Bilaspur, has jurisdiction over the whole state.

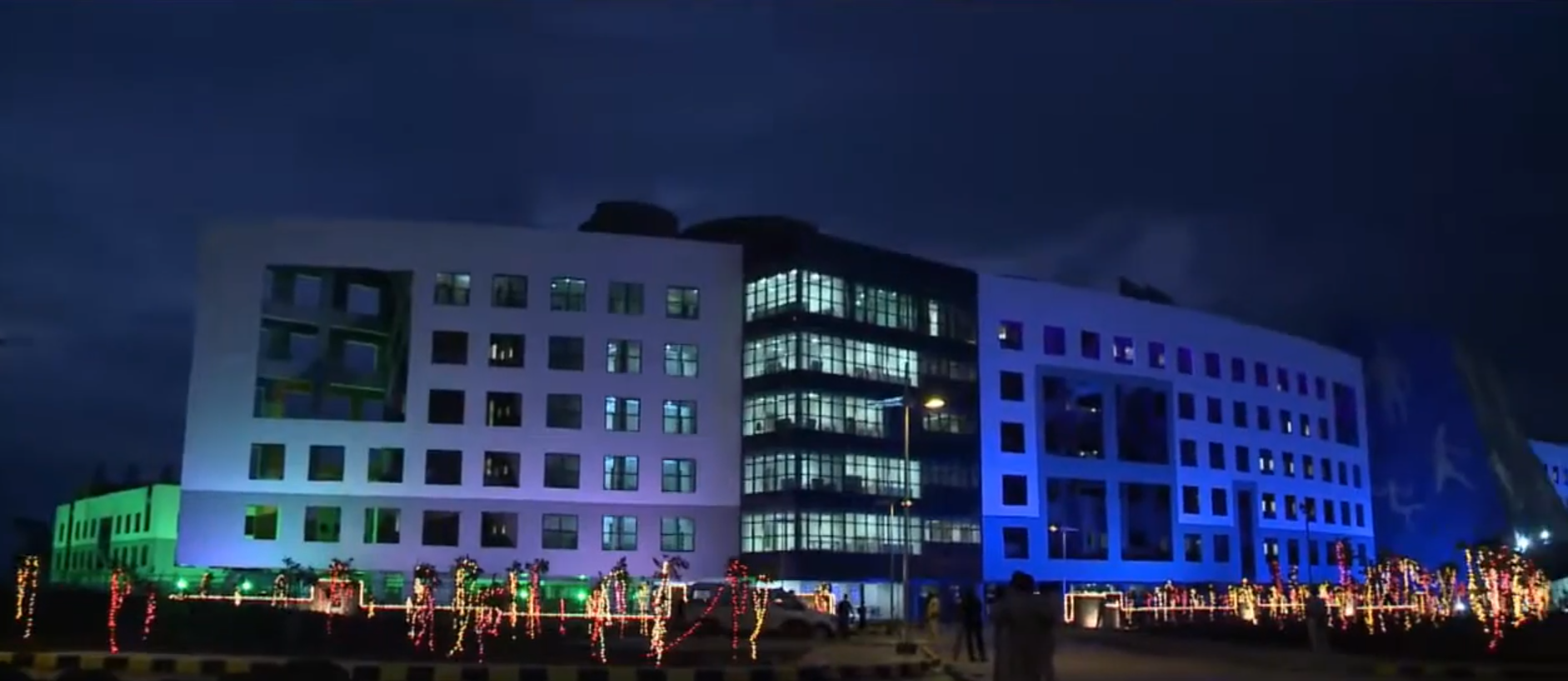
Mantralaya Naya Raipur (Executive)

The present Legislative Assembly of Chhattisgarh is unicameral, consisting of 90 Members of Legislative Assembly (M.L.A) (90 elected). Its term is five years, unless dissolved sooner.

== Council of Ministers ==
Portfolio	Minister	Took office	Left office	Party
Chief Minister: General Administration; Mineral Resources; Energy; Public Relation; Transport; Excise; Any other departments not allocated to any Minister.	Vishnu Deo Sai	13 December 2023	Incumbent	BJP
Deputy Chief Minister: Public Works Department; Public Health Engineering; Law & Legislative Affairs; Urban Administration & Development	Arun Sao	13 December 2023	Incumbent	BJP
Deputy Chief Minister: Home Affairs; Rural Development and Panchayat; Technical Education; Science and Technology	Vijay Sharma	13 December 2023	Incumbent	BJP
Minister of School Education; Minister of Law & Legislative Affairs; Village Industries	Gajendra Yadav	20 August 2025	Incumbent	BJP
Agriculture; Scheduled Tribes Development	Ramvichar Netam	22 December 2023	Incumbent	BJP
Food, Civil Supplies and Consumer Protection	Dayaldas Baghel	22 December 2023	Incumbent	BJP
Parliamentary Affairs; Water Resources; Forest and Climate Change; Cooperatives	Kedar Nath Kashyap	22 December 2023	Incumbent	BJP
Commerce and Industry; Labour	Lakhan Lal Dewangan	22 December 2023	Incumbent	BJP
Health and Family Welfare; Medical Education; Other Backward Classes and Minorities Development; 20-Point Implementation	Shyam Bihari Jaiswal	22 December 2023	Incumbent	BJP
Finance; Commercial Tax; Housing; Environment; Planning, Economics and Statistics	O. P. Choudhary	22 December 2023	Incumbent	BJP
Women and Child Development; Social Welfare	Laxmi Rajwade	22 December 2023	Incumbent	BJP
Revenue; Disaster Management; Sports and Youth Welfare	Tank Ram Verma	22 December 2023	Incumbent	BJP
Minister of Tourism and Culture; Minister of Dharmik Nyas (Religious Trust) and Dharmsva	Rajesh Agrawal	20 August 2025	Incumbent	BJP
Skill development; Technical Education and Employment; Scheduled Caste Development	Guru Khushwant Saheb	20 August 2025	Incumbent	BJP
School Education; Public Health Engineering; Law & Legislative Affairs; Urban Administration & Development; Minister of Higher Education; Minister of Tourism and Culture; Minister of Dharmik Nyas (Religious Trust) and Dharmsva	Brijmohan Agrawal	22 December 2023	19 June 2024	BJP
