= Rajesh Agrawal =

Indian politician

Rajesh Agrawal (born 1966) is an Indian politician from Chhattisgarh. He is an MLA from Ambikapur Assembly constituency in Surguja district. He won the 2023 Chhattisgarh Legislative Assembly election, representing the Bharatiya Janata Party.

== Early life and education ==
Agrawal is from Lakhanpur near Ambikapur, Surguja district, Chhattisgarh. He is the son of late Chandi Ram Agrawal. He passed Class 10 in 1983, the higher secondary school examination conducted by Madhyamik Siksha Mandal, Bhopal. He and his wife run their own businesses.

== Career ==
Agrawal won from Ambikapur Assembly constituency representing the Bharatiya Janata Party in the 2023 Chhattisgarh Legislative Assembly election. He polled 90,780 votes and defeated his nearest rival and deputy chief minister, T. S. Singh Deo of the Indian National Congress, by a narrow margin of 94 votes. In 2018, he quit Indian National Congress and joined the Bharatiya Janata Party and became the Surguja district executive committee member. He rose the ladder quickly and was nominated to contest the important Ambikapur seat and won the 2023 Assembly election.
