= Gajendra Yadav =

Indian politician

Gajendra Yadav (born 1978) is an Indian politician from Chhattisgarh. He is an MLA from Durg City Assembly constituency in Durg District. He won the 2023 Chhattisgarh Legislative Assembly election, representing the Bharatiya Janata Party.

== Early life and education ==
Yadav is from Durg City, Durg District, Chhattisgarh. He is the son of Bisram Yadav. He completed his M.A. in 2003 at Pandit Ravi Shankar Shukla University.

== Career ==
Yadav won from Durg City Assembly constituency representing the Bharatiya Janata Party in the 2023 Chhattisgarh Legislative Assembly election. He polled 97,906 votes and defeated his nearest rival, Arun Vora of the Indian National Congress, by a margin of 48,697 votes. In December 2023, immediately after he was elected, he toured the constituency and took stock of the works needed for development.
