= Chief Minister of Chhattisgarh =

Leader of the executive branch of Government of Chhatisgarh

- Emblem of Chhattisgarh

- Flag of India

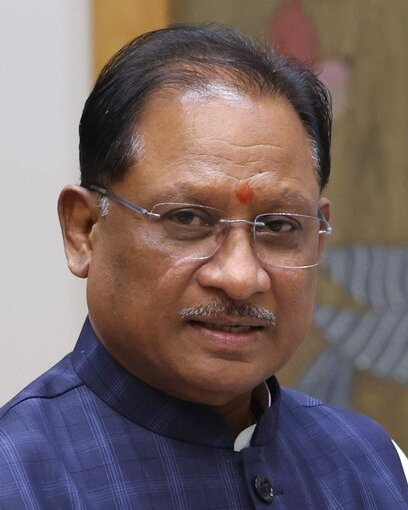
- Incumbent; Vishnu Deo Sai since 13 December 2023
- Chief Minister's Office; Government of Chhattisgarh
- Style: The Honourable
- Type: Head of government
- Status: Leader of the Executive
- Abbreviation: CMoChhatisgarh
- Member of: State Cabinet; Legislative Assembly
- Reports to: Governor of Chhattisgarh; Chhattisgarh Legislative Assembly
- Residence: B-3, Civil Lines, Raipur
- Seat: Mahanadi Bhawan, Nava Raipur
- Nominator: MLAs of the majority party or alliance
- Appointer: Governor of Chhattisgarh; by convention based on appointees ability to command confidence in the Chhattisgarh Legislative Assembly
- Term length: At the confidence of the assembly; Chief minister's term is for five years and is subject to no term limits.
- Inaugural holder: Ajit Jogi
- Formation: 1 November 2000 (25 years ago)
- Deputy: Deputy Chief Minister of Chhattisgarh
- Salary: ₹230,000 (US$2,400)/monthly; ₹2,760,000 (US$29,000)/annually
- Website: Official website

The Chief Minister of Chhattisgarh is the chief executive of the Indian state of Chhattisgarh. In accordance with the Constitution of India, the governor is a state's de jure head, but de facto executive authority rests with the chief minister. Following elections to the legislative assembly, the state's governor usually invites the party (or coalition) with a majority of seats to form the government. The governor appoints the chief minister, whose council of ministers are collectively responsible to the assembly. Given the confidence of the assembly, the chief minister's term is for five years and is subject to no term limits. Chief Minister also serves as Leader of the House in the Legislative Assembly.

Four people have served as the state's chief minister since Chhattisgarh's formation on 1 November 2000 as a result of the Madhya Pradesh Reorganisation Act, 2000. The first was Ajit Jogi of the Indian National Congress. He was succeeded in 2003 by Raman Singh of the Bharatiya Janata Party who served three consecutive five-year terms. Third person to serve in the office was Congress leader Bhupesh Baghel, who served from 2018 to 2023, was succeeded by Vishnudeo Sai, the current incumbent, following the resounding victory of Bharatiya Janata Party in the 2023 elections.

== Oath as the state chief minister ==
The chief minister serves five years in the office. The following is the oath of the chief minister of state:

I, <Name of Chief Minister>, do swear in the name of God/solemnly affirm that I will bear true faith and allegiance to the Constitution of India as by law established, that I will uphold the sovereignty and integrity of India, that I will faithfully and conscientiously discharge my duties as a Minister for the State of () and that I will do right to all manner of people in accordance with the Constitution and the law without fear or favour, affection or ill-will.

Oath of Secrecy

"I, [Name], do swear in the name of God / solemnly affirm that I will not directly or indirectly communicate or reveal to any person or persons any matter which shall be brought under my consideration or shall become known to me as a Minister for the State of [Name of State] except as may be required for the due discharge of my duties as such Minister."Pad ki Shapath (Oath of Office) "Main, [CM ka Naam], Ishwar ki shapath leta hoon / satyanishtha se pratigyan karta hoon ki main vidhi dwara sthapit Bharat ke Samvidhan ke prati sachi shraddha aur nishtha rakhunga. Main Bharat ki prabhuta aur akhandta akshunn rakhunga. Main [State ka Naam] ke Rajya ke Mukhya Mantri ke roop mein apne kartavyon ka shraddhapoorvak aur shuddh antahkaran se nirvahan karunga, tatha main bhay ya pakshpat, anurag ya dwesh ke bina, sabhi prakar ke logon ke prati Samvidhan aur vidhi ke anusar nyay karunga." B. Gopniyata ki Shapath (Oath of Secrecy) "Main, [CM ka Naam], Ishwar ki shapath leta hoon / satyanishtha se pratigyan karta hoon ki jo vishay [State ka Naam] ke Rajya ke Mukhya Mantri ke roop mein mere vichar ke liye laya jayega athva mujhe gyaat hoga, use kisi vyakti ya vyaktityon ko, tab ke sivay jab ki aise Mukhya Mantri ke roop mein apne kartavyon ke uchit nirvahan ke liye aisa karna apekshit ho, main pratyaksh (directly) ya apratyaksh (indirectly) roop mein sansuchit ya prakat nahi karunga."

== Chief Ministers of Chhattisgarh (2000-present) ==
No.	Portrait	Chief Minister (Birth-Death) Constituency	Election	Term of office			Appointed by (Governor)	Political party	Ministry
No.	Portrait	Chief Minister (Birth-Death) Constituency	Election	From	To	Period	Appointed by (Governor)	Political party	Ministry
1	Ajit Jogi	Ajit Jogi (1946–2020); MLA for Marwahi	– (Interim) (Note: The first Legislative Assembly of Chhattisgarh was constituted by the MLAs elected in the 1998 Madhya Pradesh Legislative Assembly election, whose constituencies were in the newly formed Chhattisgarh.)	1 November 2000	7 December 2003	3 years, 36 days	Dinesh Nandan Sahay	Indian National Congress	Jogi
2		Raman Singh (born 1952); MLA for Dongargaon, until 2008; MLA for Rajnandgaon, from 2008	2003 (2nd)	7 December 2003	12 December 2008	15 years, 4 days	Krishna Mohan Seth	Bharatiya Janata Party	Singh I
2		Raman Singh (born 1952); MLA for Dongargaon, until 2008; MLA for Rajnandgaon, from 2008	2008 (3rd)	12 December 2008	12 December 2013	15 years, 4 days	E. S. L. Narasimhan	Bharatiya Janata Party	Singh II
2		Raman Singh (born 1952); MLA for Dongargaon, until 2008; MLA for Rajnandgaon, from 2008	2013 (4th)	12 December 2013	11 December 2018	15 years, 4 days	Shekhar Dutt	Bharatiya Janata Party	Singh III
3		Bhupesh Baghel (born 1960); MLA for Patan	2018 (5th)	17 December 2018	13 December 2023	4 years, 361 days	Anandiben M. Patel	Indian National Congress	Baghel
4		Vishnu Deo Sai (born 1964); MLA for Kunkuri	2023 (6th)	13 December 2023	Incumbent	2 years, 316 days	Biswabhusan Harichandan	Bharatiya Janata Party	Sai

== Statistics ==
Fraction of time of holding CMO by party (as of May 2026)
1. Bharatiya Janata Party (80.0%)
2. Indian National Congress (20.0%)

#	Chief Minister	Party	Term of office	
#	Chief Minister	Party	Longest continuous term	Total duration of chief ministership
1	Raman Singh	BJP	15 years, 10 days	15 years, 10 days
2	Bhupesh Baghel	INC	4 years, 361 days	4 years, 361 days
3	Ajit Jogi	INC	3 years, 34 days	3 years, 34 days
4	Vishnu Deo Sai	BJP*	2 years, 316 days	2 years, 316 days
