= Vishnu Deo Sai =

Chief Minister Of Chhattisgarh (born 1964)

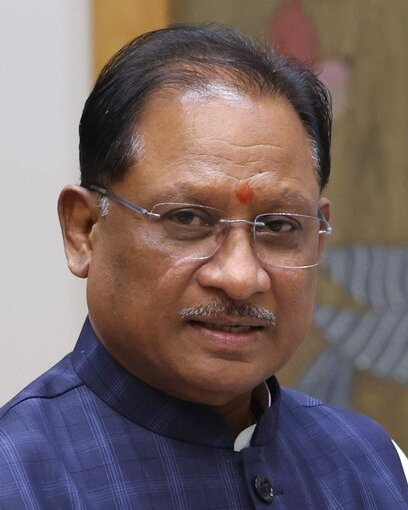
- Sai, c. 2025

4th Chief Minister of Chhattisgarh
- Incumbent
- Assumed office 13 December 2023
- Governor: Biswabhusan Harichandan; Ramen Deka
- Deputy: Arun Sao; Vijay Sharma
- Cabinet: Vishnudeo Sai
- Ministry and Departments: List: •General Administration •Mineral Resources •Energy •Public Relation •Transport •Excise •Any other departments not allocated to any Minister.
- Preceded by: Bhupesh Baghel

Member of Chhattisgarh Legislative Assembly
- Incumbent
- Assumed office 3 December 2023
- Preceded by: U. D. Minj
- Constituency: Kunkuri

President of Bharatiya Janata Party, Chhattisgarh
- In office 2 June 2020 – 9 August 2022
- Preceded by: Vikram Usendi
- Succeeded by: Arun Sao
- In office 21 January 2014 – 16 August 2014
- Preceded by: Ram Sewak Paikra
- Succeeded by: Dharamlal Kaushik
- In office 31 October 2006 – 11 May 2010
- Preceded by: Shiv Pratap Singh
- Succeeded by: Ram Sewak Paikra

Union Minister of State
- In office 26 May 2014 – 30 May 2019
- Ministry: Term
- Steel: 26 May 2014 – 30 May 2019
- Mines: 26 May 2014 – 5 July 2016
- Labour & Employment: 26 May 2014 – 9 November 2014

Member of Parliament, Lok Sabha
- In office 1999–2019
- Preceded by: Ajit Jogi
- Succeeded by: Gomtee Sai
- Constituency: Raigarh, Chhattisgarh

Member of Madhya Pradesh Legislative Assembly
- In office 1990–1998
- Preceded by: Nand Kumar Sai
- Succeeded by: Nand Kumar Sai
- Constituency: Tapkara

Personal details
- Born: 21 February 1964 (age 62) Bagiya, Madhya Pradesh, India
- Party: Bharatiya Janata Party
- Spouse: Kaushalya Sai (m. 1991)
- Children: 3
- Education: Loyola Higher Secondary School, Kunkuri

Vishnu Deo Sai (born 21 February 1964) is an Indian politician currently serving as the Chief Minister of Chhattisgarh from 2023. He is the first senior tribal leader in Central India. Sai is a member of the Bharatiya Janata Party (BJP) and the Rashtriya Swayamsevak Sangh (RSS). He currently represents Kunkuri in Chhattisgarh Legislative Assembly.

He officially became Chhattisgarh's second tribal Chief Minister after taking oath on 13 December 2023.

Sai is known for his decisive approach to addressing public welfare issues. His dedication extends beyond Chhattisgarh, as he has actively engaged with tribal concerns in other states including Madhya Pradesh, Odisha, Telangana, and Maharashtra.

== Early life ==
Sai was born to a farming family on 21 February 1964, in the village of Bagiya, located in the Farsabahar development block of Jashpur district, Chhattisgarh. His father, the late Shri Ramprasad Sai, and mother, Smt. Jasmani Devi Sai raised him. His educational journey led him through higher secondary schooling in Kunkuri, within the Jashpur district.

Hailing from the tribal Kanwar community, Sai's uncles are politicians Narhari Prasad Sai and Kedarnath Sai. Narhari Prasad Sai served as an MLA from the Lailunga Assembly constituency from 1962 to 1967 and from the Bagicha Assembly Constituency from 1972 to 1977. Later, he held the position of Member of Parliament and Union Minister of State for Communications from 1977 to 1979. Kedarnath Sai represented the Tapkara Assembly Constituency during the Jan Sangh era from 1967 to 1972. Additionally, Sai's grandfather, the late Budhnath Sai, served as an MLA from 1947 to 1952.

== Education ==
Chief Minister Vishnu Deo Sai pursued his education up to the Higher Secondary level. His father died when he was in the fourth standard, leaving him with the responsibility of supporting his mother, Jasmani Devi, and his two younger brothers, Om Prakash Sai and Vinod Sai. Following his Higher Secondary education for free at a Christian school named Loyola Higher Secondary School, Kunkuri, he was unable to continue his studies further and instead took up agriculture to provide for his family.

During this period, he became familiar with Late Dilip Singh Judeo, a prominent leader of the Bharatiya Janata Party and then a Member of Parliament. Sai regards Late Dilip Singh Judeo as his political mentor and guide.

== Political career ==
Sai started in politics in 1989, when he was elected Panch of Bagiya Gram Panchayat in undivided Madhya Pradesh. The 1990 Sarpanch of Gram Panchayat Bagiya was elected without a single vote. He won the seat of a member of the assembly for the Tapkara Assembly constituency that same year, marking his entry into legislative politics.

Sai continued his rise in politics by holding the position of Member of the Legislative Assembly (MLA) for two terms in a row, from 1990 to 1998. After that, he entered national politics and, beginning in 1999, won four terms in a row as the representative for the Raigarh Lok Sabha constituency. From 1999 until 2014, Sai served in the 13th, 14th, 15th, and 16th Lok Sabha, making significant contributions during that time. Sai's dedication to serving the public also extended to his ministerial positions. From 27 May 2014, until 2019, he effectively oversaw the Ministries of Steel, Mines, Labor and Employment as a Union Minister of State.

Sai was named the Bharatiya Janata Party, Chhattisgarh State President in 2006, after being recognized for his leadership within the organization. He then served in this capacity again from 2020 to 2022. He was named to the BJP National Working Committee as a special invitee member on 2 December 2022. He was then elevated to the rank of full member of the BJP National Working Committee on 8 July 2023.

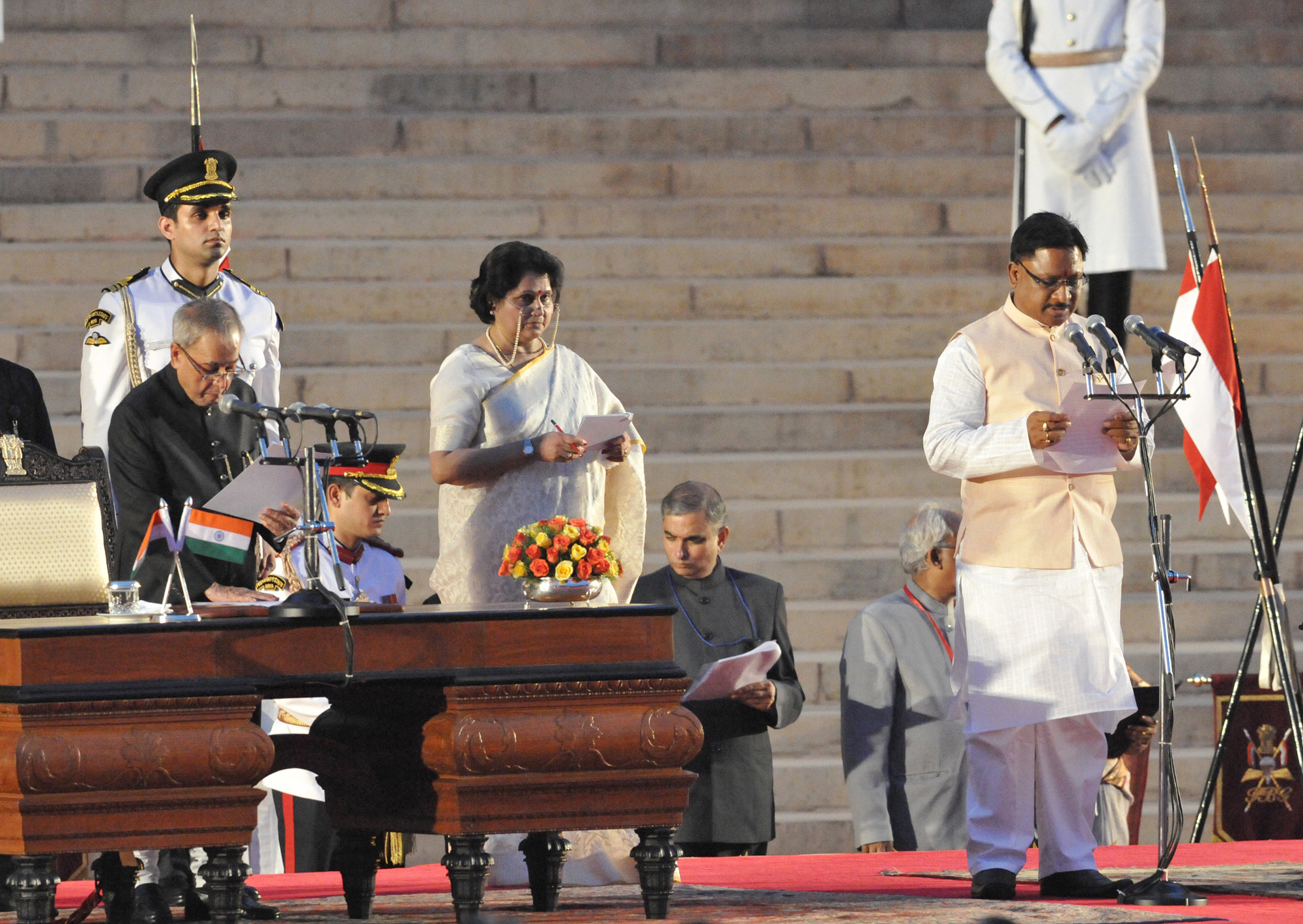
The President, Shri Pranab Mukherjee administering the oath as Minister of State to Shri Vishnu Deo Sai, at a swearing-in ceremony at Rashtrapati Bhavan, in New Delhi on 26 May 2014

=== Chief Minister of Chhattisgarh ===
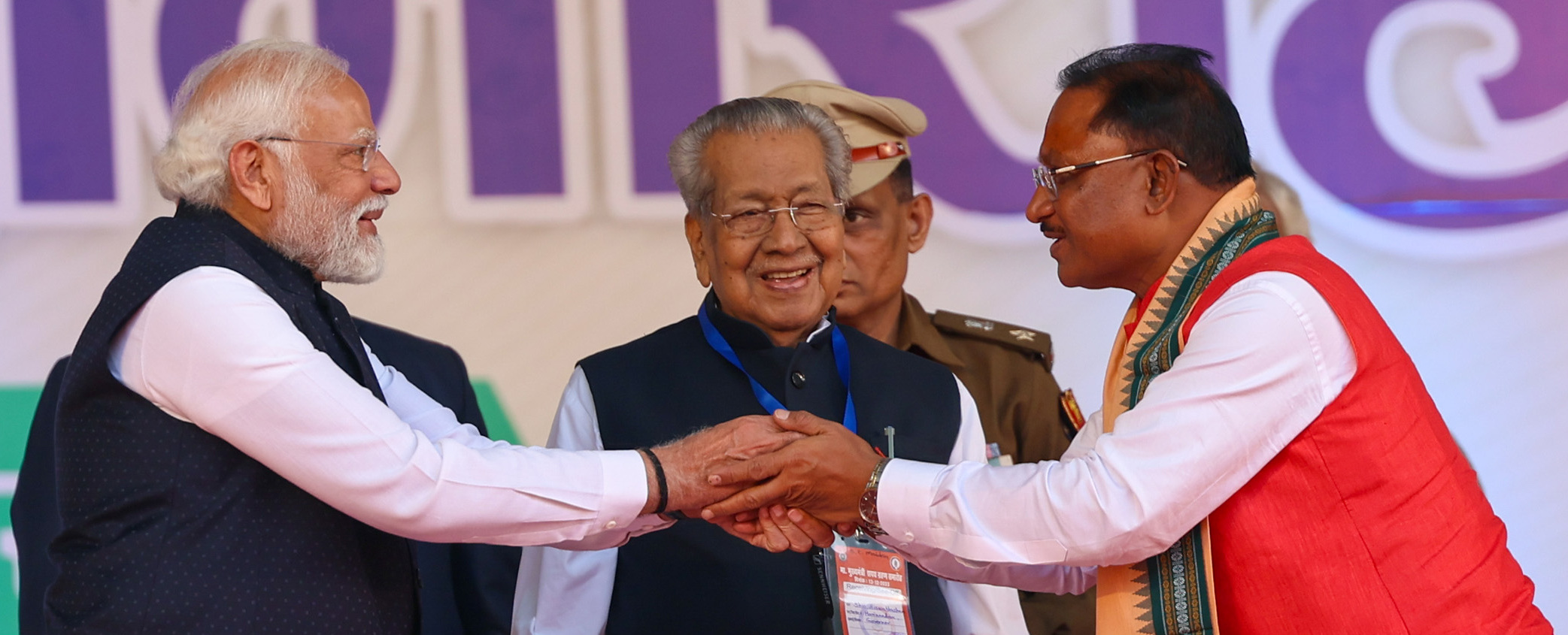
PM Modi with Vishnu Deo Sai and Biswabhusan Harichandan

In a BJP meeting, it was announced that Vishnu Deo Sai will become the next Chief Minister of Chhattisgarh along with Arun Sao and Vijay Sharma as deputy CM. On 13 December 2023, Sai took oath as Chief Minister of Chhattisgarh and Arun Sao and Vijay Sharma were elected as Deputy Chief Ministers of Chhattisgarh at the Science College ground in Raipur.

== Philanthropy ==
Beyond politics, Sai has actively engaged in social work, particularly focused on tribal education and the development of essential infrastructure in tribal regions. He has been a consistent advocate for improving the living standards of backward tribes, reflecting a deep-rooted commitment to social welfare. Known for his reverence for Lord Shri Ram, Sai staunchly opposes conversions through compulsion or deception.

== Stance on Naxalism ==
Since assuming the role of Chief Minister of Chhattisgarh, Vishnu Deo Sai has swiftly implemented numerous decisive measures for public welfare, profoundly impacting both the state and national political landscape. In tackling the longstanding issue of Naxalism in Chhattisgarh, Sai has employed a strategy of "Boli ka Jawab Boli Se aur Goli ka Jawab Goli" (dialogue for dialogue, and bullet for bullet).

Within a mere four months of his tenure, security forces engaged in multiple encounters with Maoists in Bastar, resulting in the killing of over 100 Naxalites, including several high-profile leaders with substantial bounties on their heads. Notably, a large number of Maoists and their supporters have surrendered, drawn by the rehabilitation policies of the Chhattisgarh Government. Concurrently, the Vishnu Deo Sai government has significantly increased the number of security camps in Bastar. The "Niyad Nellnar" scheme has been initiated to foster Bastar's development through these security camps, ensuring that villages within a five-kilometer radius receive the benefits of various Central and State Government schemes, thereby promoting comprehensive community development.

== Pradhan Mantri Awas Yojana ==
In compliance to the Prime Minister's guarantee, the construction of permanent housing under the Pradhan Mantri Awas Yojana has commenced for over 1.8 million poor families in the state.

== Governance ==
Vishnu Deo Sai established Good Governance. Government has taken consistent action against corruption. Numerous cases of corruption alleged to have occurred during the tenure of the previous Congress government are being swiftly investigated. These cases involve a range of scandals, including those related to coal, liquor, sand, teacher recruitment, PSC recruitment, and the Mahadev app. The involvement of key political figures from the Congress party in these scandals has garnered national attention, placing these cases in the spotlight on a broader scale.

On Good Governance Day, 25 December 2023, the state government transferred an amount of ₹3,716 crore as two years' pending bonus into the bank accounts of 1.3 million farmers, thus fulfilling the guarantee.

The 'Shri Ramlala Ayodhya Dham' Darshan Yojana in Chhattisgarh has also been started by the Vishnu Deo Sai administration. This program offers the state's believers free pilgrimage tours to Ayodhya.

With the hike in remuneration rate for Tendu Patta collection from ₹4,000 per standard bag to ₹5,500 per standard bag, Vishnu Deo Sai government has benefited 12 lakh 50 thousand families engaged in Tendu Patta collection.

== Krishak Unnati Yojana ==
The Vishnu Deo Sai administration of Chhattisgarh has fulfilled the guarantee under the Krishak Unnati Yojana by purchasing paddy from farmers at a rate of ₹3,100 per quintal, with a maximum of 21 quintals per acre. A record-breaking 14.492 lakh metric tons of paddy were procured from 24 lakh 75 thousand farmers in the state in 2023–2024. The support price of ₹31,913 crore and the differential amount of ₹13,320 crore have been disclosed.

== Women empowerment ==
'Mahatari Vandan Yojana' has been introduced by the Vishnu Deo Sai government to support women's socio-economic empowerment in the state. More than 70 lakh women in the state are receiving ₹1,000 a month deposited into their bank accounts under this plan.

On the lines of Prime Minister Narendra Modi's call to build 'Developed India', the Vishnu Deo Sai government has set a goal to build 'Developed Chhattisgarh'. In the same sequence, the state government is preparing a vision document titled "Amritkal Chhattisgarh Vision @2047."

== Personal life ==
On 27 May 1991, Vishnu Deo Sai married Kaushalya Devi Sai. The couple have one son and two daughters.

== Electoral performance ==
=== Lok Sabha ===
Election	Constituency	Party	Result	Vote	Opposite candidate	Party	Vote
1999	Raigarh	BJP	Won	276,244	Pushpa Devi Singh	INC	270,471
2004	Raigarh	BJP	Won	329,057	Rampukar Singh	INC	254,814
2009	Raigarh	BJP	Won	443,948	Hridayaram Rathiya	INC	388,100
2014	Raigarh	BJP	Won	662,478	Arti Singh	INC	445,728

=== Vidhan Sabha ===
Election	Constituency	Party	Result	Vote	Opposite candidate	Party	Vote
1990	Tapkara	BJP	Won	28,701	Theoder Ekka	Ind	14,135
1993	Tapkara	BJP	Won	24,732	Ishwar Sai	INC	21,288
1998	Pathalgaon	BJP	Lost	30,505	Rampukar Singh Thakur	INC	33,750
2003	Pathalgaon	BJP	Lost	36,888	Rampukar Singh Thakur	INC	37,205
2008	Pathalgaon	BJP	Lost	54,627	Rampukar Singh Thakur	INC	64,543
2023	Kunkuri	BJP	Won	87,604	U. D. Minj	INC	62,063

== See also ==
- Vishnu Deo Sai ministry
- Raman Singh
- Arun Sao
- Vijay Sharma

Political offices
Preceded by Bhupesh Baghel	Chief Minister of Chhattisgarh; 11 December 2023	Incumbent
Party political offices
Preceded by Vikram Usendi	President of the Bharatiya Janata Party, Chhattisgarh; 2020–2022	Succeeded by Arun Sao
Preceded by Ram Sewak Paikra	President of the Bharatiya Janata Party, Chhattisgarh; 2014–2014	Succeeded by Dharamlal Kaushik
Preceded by Shiv Pratap Singh	President of the Bharatiya Janata Party, Chhattisgarh; 2006–2010	Succeeded by Ram Sewak Paikra
Lok Sabha
Preceded by Ajit Jogi	Member of Parliament for Raigarh; 1999–2019	Succeeded by Gomtee Sai
