= 2004 Indian general election in Chhattisgarh =

- April–May 2004

11 seats
	First party	Second party
	NDA	INC
Party	NDA	INC+ (post poll UPA)
Seats won	10	1
- Chhattisgarh
Prime Minister before election
A. B. Vajpayee
BJP
Prime Minister after election
Manmohan Singh
INC

The 2004 Indian general election polls in Chhattisgarh were held for 11 seats in the state. This is the first time, that an election took place in this state after it achieved statehood from Madhya Pradesh in 2000. The Result was a Landslide Victory for the Bharatiya Janata Party winning 10 out of 11 Seats and the Indian National Congress could win only one seat.

== Parties and alliances ==
=== National Democratic Alliance ===
Party	Flag	Symbol	Leader	Seats contested
Bharatiya Janata Party			Raman Singh	11

=== United Progressive Alliance ===
Party	Flag	Symbol	Leader	Seats contested
Indian National Congress			Ajit Jogi	11

== Results by Party ==
Party Name	Popular vote			Seats		
Party Name	Votes	%	±pp	Contested	Won	+/−
BJP	34,13,759	47.78	▼0.12	11	10	
INC	28,69,260	40.16	▼3.20	11	1	
Others	5,86,543	8.21	Steady	46	0	Steady
IND	2,75,614	3.86		34	0	Steady
Total	71,45,176	100%	-	102	11	-

== Results by Constituency ==
Keys: BJP (10) INC (1)

Constituency		Winner				Runner Up				Margin	%
#	Name	Candidate	Party	Votes	%	Candidate	Party	Votes	%	Margin	%
1	Surguja (ST)	Nand Kumar Sai	BJP	357,108	52.77	Khelsai Singh	INC	253,656	37.48	103,452	15.29
2	Raigarh (ST)	Vishnu Deo Sai	BJP	329,057	50.75	Rampukar Singh	INC	254,814	39.30	74,243	11.45
3	Janjgir	Karuna Shukla	BJP	303,655	42.31	Charan Das Mahant	INC	292,326	40.73	11,329	1.58
4	Bilaspur (SC)	Punnulal Mohle	BJP	324,729	52.26	Basant Pahre	INC	243,176	39.13	81,553	13.13
5	Sarangarh (SC)	Guharam Ajgalle	BJP	242,575	41.26	Paras Bhardwaj	INC	183,457	31.20	59,118	10.06
6	Raipur	Ramesh Bais	BJP	376,029	54.53	Shyama Shukla	INC	246,510	35.75	129,519	18.78
7	Mahasamund	Ajit Jogi	INC	414,647	53.75	Vidya Charan Shukla	BJP	296,142	38.39	118,505	15.36
8	Kanker (ST)	Sohan Potai	BJP	274,294	49.52	Ganga Potai Thakur	INC	200,668	36.23	73,626	13.29
9	Bastar (ST)	Baliram Kashyap	BJP	212,893	47.26	Mahendra Karma	INC	158,520	35.19	54,373	12.07
10	Durg	Tarachand Sahu	BJP	382,757	50.24	Bhupesh Baghel	INC	321,289	42.17	61,468	8.07
11	Rajnandgaon	Pradeep Gandhi	BJP	314,520	47.23	Devwrat Singh	INC	300,197	45.08	14,323	2.15

== Assembly segments wise lead of Parties ==
Party	Assembly segments	Position in Assembly (as of 2008 election)
Bharatiya Janata Party	73	50
Indian National Congress	17	38
Total	90	
