= 2014 Indian general election in Chhattisgarh =

Indian general election, 2014 in Chhattisgarh
- 10, 17, 24 April 2014.

All 11 constituencies from Chhattisgarh to the Lok Sabha
- Turnout: 69.39% (▲14.10%)
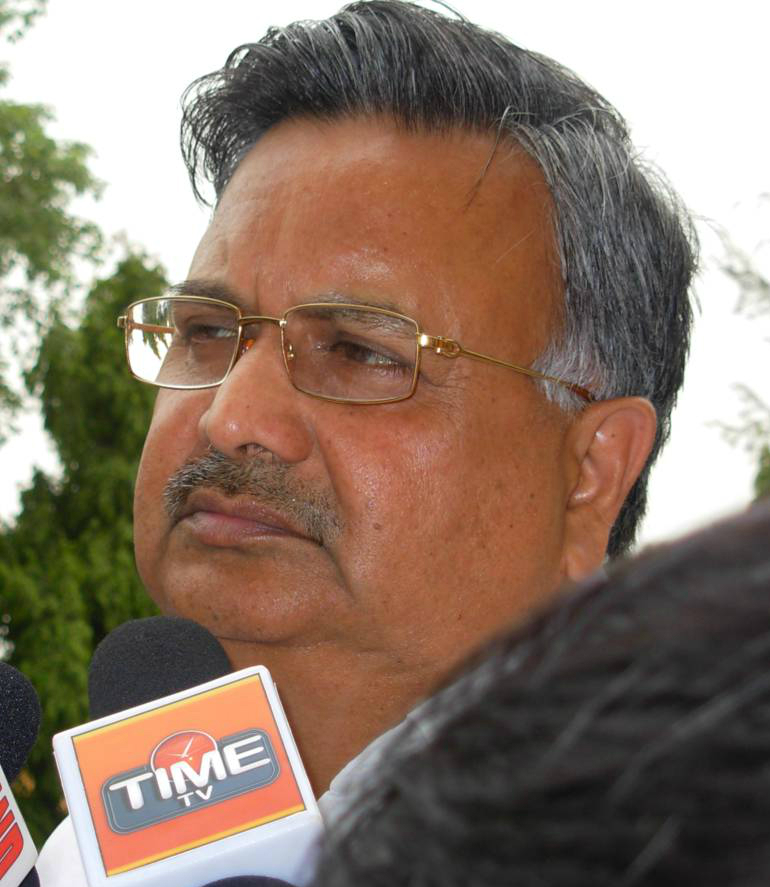

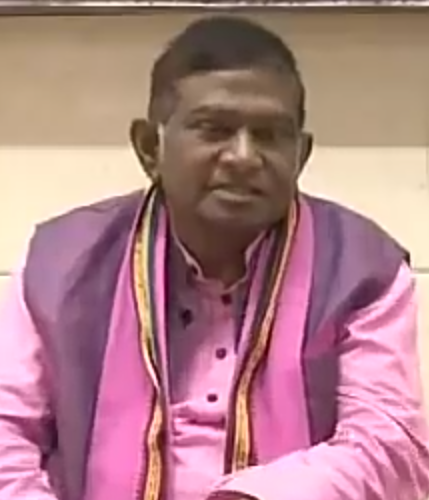
	Majority party	Minority party
Leader	Raman Singh	Ajit Jogi
Party	BJP	INC
Alliance	NDA	UPA
Leader's seat	Did not contest	Mahasamund (lost)
Last election	10	1
Seats won	10	1
Seat change	Steady	Steady
- Seatwise Result Map of the 2014 general election in Chhattisgarh
Prime Minister before election
Manmohan Singh
INC
Prime Minister after election
Narendra Modi
BJP

The 2014 Indian general election in Chhattisgarh was held in three phases on 10, 17 and 24 April 2014. The Result was a Landslide Victory for the BJP winning 10 out of 11 Seats and the Congress won only one seat.

== Parties and alliances ==
=== National Democratic Alliance ===
Party	Flag	Symbol	Leader	Seats contested
Bharatiya Janata Party			Raman Singh	11

=== United Progressive Alliance ===
Party	Flag	Symbol	Leader	Seats contested
Indian National Congress			Ajit Jogi	11

== Result ==
Results of Indian general election, 2014 in Chhattisgarh
Parties and coalitions	Seats			Popular vote		
Parties and coalitions	Contested	Won	+/−	Votes	%	±pp
Bharatiya Janata Party	11	10	Steady	59,73,904	49.65%	▲4.62%
Indian National Congress	11	1	Steady	47,02,813	39.09%	▲1.78%
Bahujan Samaj Party	11	0	Steady	2,93,910	2.44%	▼2.08%
Aam Aadmi Party	10	0	New	1,40,681	1.16%	New
Gondwana Ganatantra Party	7	0	Steady	99,644	0.83%	▲0.13%
Independents	106	0	Steady	5,16,427	4.29%	▼5.56%
Total	11			1,20,30,690		
Valid votes	1,20,30,690	98.16				
Votes cast / turnout	1,22,55,579	69.54				
Registered voters	1,76,23,049	100.0				

== List of elected MPs ==
Constituency		Winner				Runner Up				Margin	%
#	Name	Candidate	Party	Votes	%	Candidate	Party	Votes	%	Margin	%
1	Sarguja	Kamalbhan Marabi	BJP	585,336	49.30	Ramdeo Tirkey	INC	438,100	36.90	147,236	12.40
2	Raigarh	Vishnu Deo Sai	BJP	662,478	53.16	Arti Singh	INC	445,728	35.77	216,750	17.39
3	Janjgir-Champa	Kamla Devi Patle	BJP	518,909	48.34	Prem Chand Jayasi	INC	343,948	32.04	174,961	16.30
4	Korba	Banshilal Mahto	BJP	439,002	41.70	Charan Das Mahant	INC	434,737	41.29	4,265	0.41
5	Bilaspur	Lakhan Lal Sahu	BJP	561,387	51.48	Karuna Shukla	INC	384,951	35.30	176,436	16.18
6	Rajnandgaon	Abhishek Singh	BJP	643,473	54.61	Kamleshwar Verma	INC	407,562	34.59	235,911	20.02
7	Durg	Tamradhwaj Sahu	INC	570,687	45.32	Saroj Pandey	BJP	553,839	43.99	16,848	1.33
8	Raipur	Ramesh Bais	BJP	654,922	52.36	Satyanarayan Sharma	INC	483,276	38.64	171,646	13.72
9	Mahasamund	Chandu Lal Sahu	BJP	503,514	44.51	Ajit Jogi	INC	502,297	44.40	1,217	0.11
10	Bastar	Dinesh Kashyap	BJP	385,829	50.11	Deepak Karma (Bunty)	INC	261,470	33.96	124,359	16.15
11	Kanker	Vikram Usendi	BJP	465,215	45.74	Phulo Devi Netam	INC	430,057	42.28	35,158	3.46

== Post-election Union Council of Ministers from Chhattisgarh ==
#	Name	Constituency	Designation	Department	From	To	Party
1	Vishnu Deo Sai	Raigarh	MoS	Mines	27 May 2014	5 July 2016	BJP
1	Vishnu Deo Sai	Raigarh	MoS	Steel	27 May 2014	30 May 2019	BJP
1	Vishnu Deo Sai	Raigarh	MoS	Labour and Employment	27 May 2014	9 November 2014	BJP

== Assembly segments wise lead of Parties ==
Party	Assembly segments	Position in Assembly (as of 2018 election)
Bharatiya Janata Party	72	15
Indian National Congress	18	68
Total	90	
