= 2009 Indian general election in Chhattisgarh =

Indian general election in Chhattisgarh, 2009
- 16 April 2009

11 seats
- Turnout: 55.29%

	First party	Second party
Party	BJP	INC
Alliance	NDA	UPA
Seats won	10	1
Seat change	Steady	Steady
Popular vote	3,851,970	3,192,007
Percentage	45.03%	37.31%
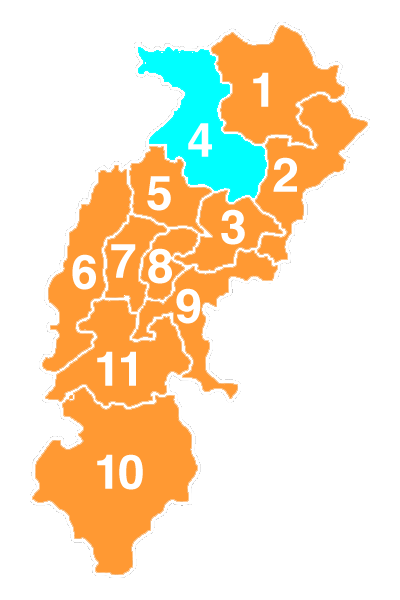
- Map of the state's eleven parliamentary constituencies
Prime Minister before election
Manmohan Singh
INC
Prime Minister after election
Manmohan Singh
INC

The 2009 Indian general election polls in Chhattisgarh were held for eleven seats in the state. The Result was a Landslide Victory for the BJP and the Congress won only one seat in first-past-the-post elections. Voting in the state took place on 16 April. The election was marred by Naxalite violence in several of the state's constituencies. Out of approximately 15.4 million eligible voters 55.29 percent exercised their right to vote.

The first phase of elections were marred by naxal violence in some pockets of the state.

== Parties and alliances ==
=== National Democratic Alliance ===
Party	Flag	Symbol	Leader	Seats contested
Bharatiya Janata Party			Raman Singh	11

=== United Progressive Alliance ===
Party	Flag	Symbol	Leader	Seats contested
Indian National Congress			Ajit Jogi	11

== Result ==
=== Result by Party ===
Party Name	Popular vote			Seats		
Party Name	Votes	%	±pp	Contested	Won	+/−
BJP	38,51,970	45.03	▼2.75	11	10	Steady
INC	31,92,007	37.31	▼2.85	11	1	Steady
BSP	3,86,872	4.52		11	0	Steady
Others	2,81,139	3.29	Steady	48	0	Steady
IND	8,42,855	9.85	▲5.99	97	0	Steady
Total	85,54,843	100%	-	178	11	-

=== Detailed Results ===
Constituency		Winner				Runner Up				Margin	%
#	Name	Candidate	Party	Votes	%	Candidate	Party	Votes	%	Margin	%
1	Sarguja (ST)	Murarilal Singh	BJP	416,532	51.73	Bhanu Pratap Singh	INC	256,984	31.92	159,548	19.81
2	Raigarh (ST)	Vishnu Deo Sai	BJP	443,948	47.44	Hridayaram Rathiya	INC	388,100	41.47	55,848	5.97
3	Janjgir-Champa (SC)	Kamla Devi Patle	BJP	302,142	40.96	Shivkumar Dahariya	INC	214,931	29.14	87,211	11.82
4	Korba	Charan Das Mahant	INC	314,616	42.20	Karuna Shukla	BJP	293,879	39.41	20,737	2.79
5	Bilaspur	Dilip Singh Judeo	BJP	347,930	45.18	Renu Jogi	INC	327,791	42.57	20,139	2.61
6	Rajnandgaon	Madhusudan Yadav	BJP	437,721	52.70	Devwrat Singh	INC	318,647	38.36	119,074	14.34
7	Durg	Saroj Pandey	BJP	283,170	31.27	Pradeep Choubey	INC	273,216	30.17	9,954	1.10
8	Raipur	Ramesh Bais	BJP	364,943	49.19	Bhupesh Baghel	INC	307,042	41.39	57,901	7.80
9	Mahasamund	Chandu Lal Sahu	BJP	371,201	47.82	Motilal Sahu	INC	319,726	41.19	51,475	6.63
10	Bastar (ST)	Baliram Kashyap	BJP	249,373	44.16	Shankar Sodi	INC	149,111	26.40	100,262	17.76
11	Kanker (ST)	Sohan Potai	BJP	341,131	45.99	Phulo Netam	INC	321,843	43.39	19,288	2.60

== Post-election Union Council of Ministers from Chhattisgarh ==
#	Name	Constituency	Designation	Department	From	To	Party
1	Charan Das Mahant	Korba	MoS	Agriculture	12 July 2011	26 May 2014	INC
1	Charan Das Mahant	Korba	MoS	Food Processing Industries	12 July 2011	26 May 2014	INC

== Assembly segments wise lead of Parties ==
Party	Assembly segments	Position in Assembly (as of 2013 election)
Bharatiya Janata Party	60	49
Indian National Congress	25	39
Bahujan Samaj Party	1	1
Communist Party of India	1	0
Others	3	1
Total	90	
