= 2019 Indian general election in Chhattisgarh =

Indian lower house election in Chhattisgarh

- 11, 18 and 23 April 2019

11 seats
- Turnout: 71.64% (▲1.24%)
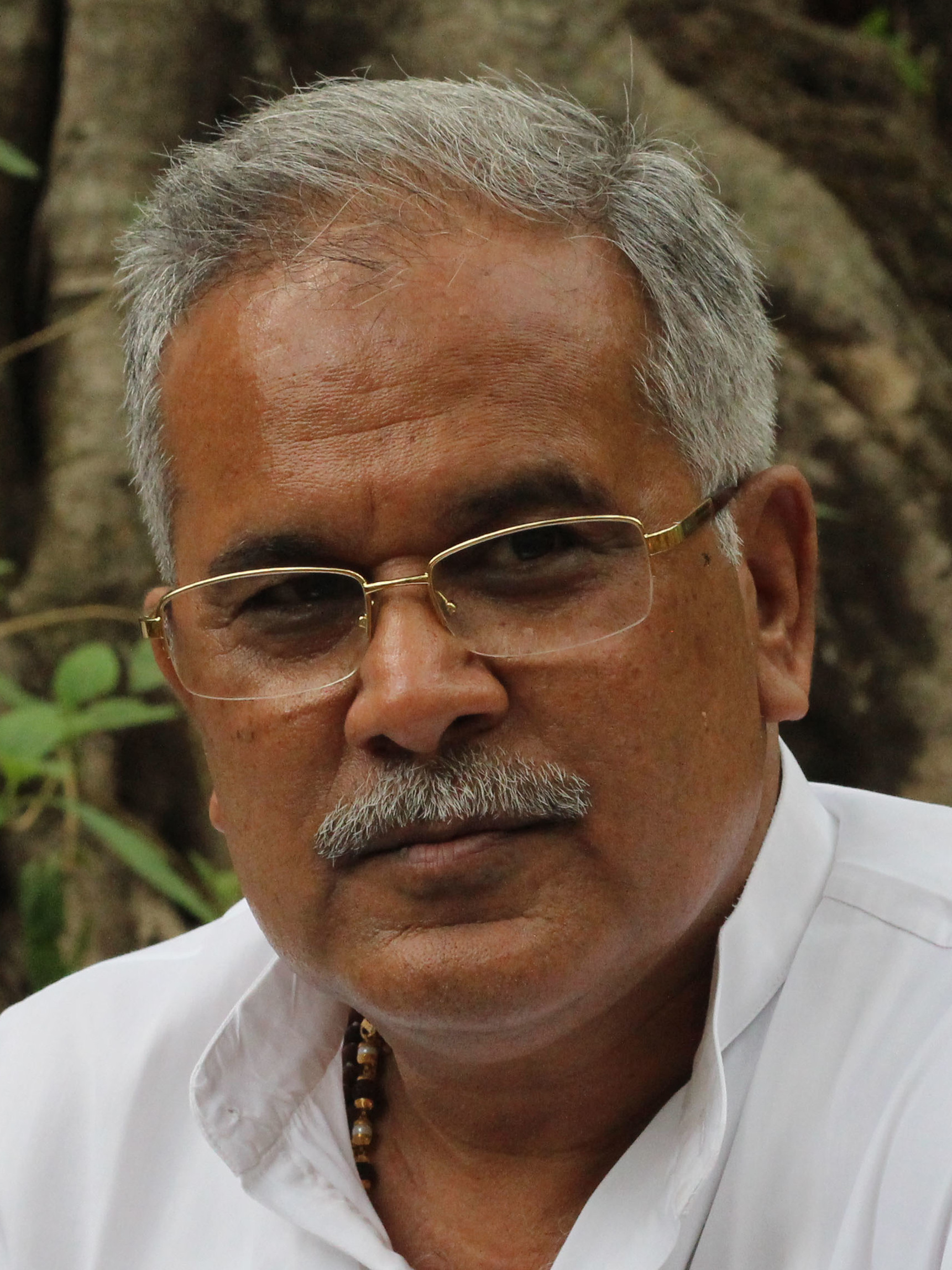
	First party	Second party
	BJP
Leader	Vikram Usendi	Bhupesh Baghel
Party	BJP	INC
Alliance	NDA	UPA
Last election	10	1
Seats won	9	2
Seat change	▼1	▲1
Percentage	50.70%	40.91%
Swing	▲2%	▲2.51%
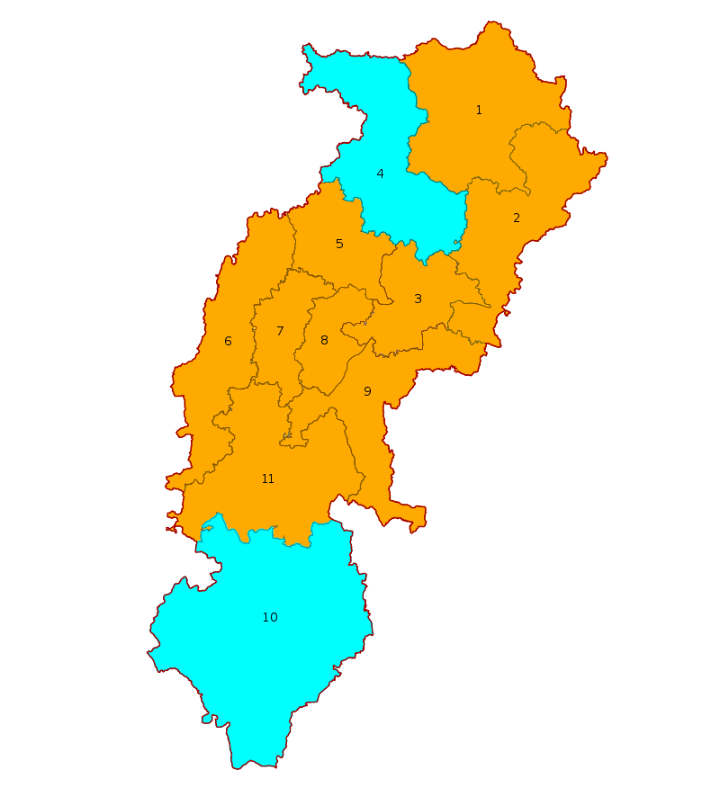
- Chhattisgarh
Prime Minister before election
Narendra Modi
BJP
Prime Minister after election
Narendra Modi
BJP

The 2019 Indian general elections held in India between 11 April and 23 April 2019 to constitute the 17th Lok Sabha.

== Parties and alliances ==
=== National Democratic Alliance ===
Party	Flag	Symbol	Leader	Seats contested
Bharatiya Janata Party			Vikram Usendi	11

=== United Progressive Alliance ===
Party	Flag	Symbol	Leader	Seats contested
Indian National Congress			Bhupesh Baghel	11

== Candidates ==
Constituency		BJP		INC	
#	Name	Party	Candidate	Party	Candidate
1	Sarguja (ST)	BJP	Renuka Singh	INC	Khelsai Singh
2	Raigarh (ST)	BJP	Gomati Sai	INC	Laljeet Rathia
3	Janjgir-Champa (SC)	BJP	Guharam Ajgalley	INC	Ravi Bhardwaj
4	Korba	BJP	Jyotinand Dubey	INC	Jyotsna Mahant
5	Bilaspur	BJP	Arun Sao	INC	Atal Shrivastava
6	Rajnandgaon	BJP	Santosh Pandey	INC	Bholaram Sahu
7	Durg	BJP	Vijay Baghel	INC	Pratima Chandrakar
8	Raipur	BJP	Sunil Kumar Soni	INC	Pramod Dubey
9	Mahasamund	BJP	Chunni Lal Sahu	INC	Dhanendra Sahu
10	Bastar (ST)	BJP	Baiduram Kashyap	INC	Deepak Baij
11	Kanker (ST)	BJP	Mohan Mandavi	INC	Biresh Thakur

== Results ==
Results was announced on 23 May 2019.

=== Party wise ===
Results of Indian general election, 2019 in Chhattisgarh
Parties and coalitions	Seats			Popular vote		
Parties and coalitions	Contested	Won	+/−	Votes	%	±pp
Bharatiya Janata Party	11	9	▼1	69,02,477	51.44%	▲1.79%
Indian National Congress	11	2	▲1	55,69,283	41.51%	▲2.42%
Bahujan Samaj Party	11	0	Steady	3,13,261	2.33%	▼0.31%
Gondwana Ganatantra Party	9	0	Steady	86,097	0.64%	▼0.19%
Independents	54	0	Steady	2,59,902	1.93%	▼2.36%
Total	11			1,34,18,288		
Valid votes	1,34,18,288	98.55				
Votes cast / turnout	1,36,14,553	73.79				
Registered voters	1,84,50,225	100.0				

=== Constituency wise ===
Constituency		Winner				Runner Up				Margin	%
#	Name	Candidate	Party	Votes	%	Candidate	Party	Votes	%	Margin	%
1	Sarguja	Renuka Singh Saruta	BJP	663,711	51.80	Khel Sai Singh	INC	505,838	39.48	157,873	12.32
2	Raigarh	Gomati Sai	BJP	658,335	48.74	Laljeet Singh Rathia	INC	592,308	43.85	66,027	4.89
3	Janjgir-Champa	Guharam Ajgalley	BJP	572,790	45.88	Ravi Parasram Bhardwaj	INC	489,535	39.21	83,255	6.67
4	Korba	Jyotsna Mahant	INC	523,310	46.01	Jyoti Nand Dubey	BJP	497,061	43.70	26,249	2.31
5	Bilaspur	Arun Sao	BJP	634,559	52.43	Atal Shrivastav	INC	492,796	40.72	141,763	11.71
6	Rajnandgaon	Santosh Pandey	BJP	662,387	50.65	Bhola Ram Sahu	INC	550,421	42.09	111,966	8.56
7	Durg	Vijay Baghel	BJP	849,374	60.99	Pratima Chandrakar	INC	457,396	32.84	391,978	28.15
8	Raipur	Sunil Kumar Soni	BJP	837,902	59.97	Pramod Dubey	INC	489,664	35.05	348,238	24.92
9	Mahasamund	Chunni Lal Sahu	BJP	616,580	50.42	Dhanendra Sahu	INC	526,069	43.02	90,511	7.40
10	Bastar	Deepak Baij	INC	402,527	44.05	Baidu Ram Kashyap	BJP	363,545	39.79	38,982	4.26
11	Kanker	Mohan Mandavi	BJP	546,233	47.08	Biresh Thakur	INC	539,319	46.48	6,914	0.60

== Post-election Union Council of Ministers from Chhattisgarh ==
#	Name	Constituency	Designation	Department	From	To	Party
1	Renuka Singh Saruta	Sarguja (ST)	MoS	Ministry of Tribal Affairs	31 May 2019	7 December 2023 (Resigned)	BJP

== Assembly segments wise lead of parties ==
Party	Assembly segments	Position in Assembly (as of 2019 2023 election)
Bharatiya Janata Party	66	&54
Indian National Congress	24	&35
Others	0	&1
Total	90	
