= Elections in Chhattisgarh =

Location of Chhattisgarh within India

Elections in Chhattisgarh have been conducted since the formation of the state in 2000, to elect the members of Chhattisgarh Legislative Assembly and the members of the Lok Sabha. There are 90 Legislative Assembly constituencies and 11 Lok Sabha constituencies in the state.

== Major Political Parties in Chhattisgarh ==
The BJP and INC have been the most dominant parties in the state since its formation. Other political parties are BSP & JCC.

== Lok Sabha elections ==
Until the year 2000, Chhattisgarh was a part of undivided Madhya Pradesh state.

Total Seats- 11

Election Year	Lok Sabha	1st Party	2nd Party	Prime Minister	PM's Party
2004	14th	BJP 10	INC 1	Manmohan Singh	INC
2009	15th	BJP 10	INC 1	Manmohan Singh	INC
2014	16th	BJP 10	INC 1	Narendra Modi	BJP
2019	17th	BJP 9	INC 2	Narendra Modi	BJP
2024	18th	BJP 10	INC 1	Narendra Modi	BJP

== Legislative Assembly elections ==
Total Seats- 90

Election Year	Assembly	1st Party	2nd Party	3rd Party	Others	Chief Minister	CM's Party
1998*	1st	INC 48	BJP 38		4	Ajit Jogi	INC
2003	2nd	BJP 50	INC 37	BSP 2	NCP 1	Raman Singh	BJP
2008	3rd	BJP 50	INC 38	BSP 2		Raman Singh	BJP
2013	4th	BJP 49	INC 39	BSP 1	IND 1	Raman Singh	BJP
2018	5th	INC 68	BJP 15	JCC 5	BSP 2	Bhupesh Baghel	INC
2023	6th	BJP 54	INC 35	GGP 1		Vishnudeo Sai	BJP

- The First assembly of Chhattisgarh was constituted on the basis of the Madhya Pradesh state legislative assembly elections held in 1998.
