= Ram Gopal Tiwari =

Indian politician

Member of Parliament, Lok Sabha
- In office 1980–1984
- Preceded by: Madan Lal Shukla
- Succeeded by: Prabhat Kumar Mishra
- Constituency: Janjgir-Champa
- In office 1971–1977
- Preceded by: Amar Singh Sahgal
- Succeeded by: Niranjan Prasad Kesharwani
- Constituency: Bilaspur

Personal details
- Born: 23 August 1910 Loharsi (Sone) Village, Bilaspur State, British India (now in Chhattisgarh, India)
- Party: Indian National Congress
- Spouse: Satyawati Devi

Ram Gopal Tiwari was an Indian politician. He was elected to the Lok Sabha, lower house of the Parliament of India as a member of the Indian National Congress.
