= Outline of Chhattisgarh =

State in central India

Location of Chhattisgarh

The following outline is provided as an overview of and topical guide to Chhattisgarh:

Chhattisgarh (/ˈtʃætɪsɡɑːr/; Hindi: [ˈtʃʰət̪ːiːsgəɽʱ]) is a landlocked state in Central India. It is the ninth largest state by area, and with a population of roughly 30 million, the seventeenth most populous. It borders seven states – Uttar Pradesh to the north, Madhya Pradesh to the northwest, Maharashtra to the southwest, Jharkhand to the northeast, Odisha to the east, Andhra Pradesh and Telangana to the south. Formerly a part of Madhya Pradesh, it was granted statehood on 1 November 2000 with Raipur as the designated state capital.

== General reference ==
=== Names ===
- Common English name: Chhattisgarh
  - Pronunciation:
- Official English name: Chhattisgarh
- Nickname(s): Dakshin Kosala, Sea-Horse State
- Adjectival(s): Chhattisgarhi
- Demonym(s): Chhattisgarhis (also, Chhattisgarhiyas)
- Abbreviations and name codes
  - ISO 3166-2 code: IN-CT
  - Vehicle registration code: CG

=== Rankings (amongst India's states) ===
- by population: 17th
- by area (2011 census): 10th
- by crime rate (2015): 11th
- by gross domestic product (GDP) (2014): 16th
- by Human Development Index (HDI):
- by life expectancy at birth:
- by literacy rate:

== Geography ==
- Geography of Chhattisgarh

=== Location ===
- Chhattisgarh is situated within the following regions:
  - Northern Hemisphere
  - Eastern Hemisphere
    - Eurasia
      - Asia
        - South Asia
          - India
            - Central India
- Time zone: Indian Standard Time (UTC+05:30)

=== Environment ===
==== Protected areas ====
- Achanakmar Wildlife Sanctuary
- Badalkhol Wildlife Sanctuary
- Barnawapara Wildlife sanctuary
- Bhairamgarh Wildlife Sanctuary
- Indravati National Park
- Kanger Valley National Park
- Pamed Wildlife Sanctuary
- Semarsot Wildlife Sanctuary
- Sitanadi Wildlife Sanctuary
- Tamor Pingla Wildlife Sanctuary
- Udanti Wildlife Sanctuary

=== Regions ===
==== Ecoregions ====
- Eastern Highlands moist deciduous forests
- Central Deccan Plateau Dry Deciduous Forests
- Chhota-Nagpur dry deciduous forests
- Narmada Valley dry deciduous forests
- Northern dry deciduous forests

==== Administrative divisions ====
===== Districts =====
- Districts of Chhattisgarh
1. Balod district
2. Baloda Bazar district
3. Balrampur district
4. Bastar district
5. Bemetara district
6. Bijapur district
7. Bilaspur district
8. Dantewada district
9. Dhamtari district
10. Durg district
11. Gariaband district
12. Janjgir–Champa district
13. Jashpur district
14. Kanker district
15. Kabirdham district
16. Kondagaon district
17. Korba district
18. Koriya district
19. Mahasamund district
20. Mungeli district
21. Narayanpur district
22. Raigarh district
23. Raipur district
24. Rajnandgaon district
25. Surguja district
26. Sukma district
27. Surajpur district
28. Gaurela pendra marwahi

===== Municipalities =====
- Municipalities of Chhattisgarh
- Capital of Chhattisgarh: Raipur
- Cities of Chhattisgarh

=== Demography ===
- Demographics of Chhattisgarh

== Government and politics ==
- Politics of Chhattisgarh
- Form of government: Indian state government (parliamentary system of representative democracy)
- Capital of Chhattisgarh: Raipur
- Elections in Chhattisgarh

=== Union government ===
- Rajya Sabha members from Chhattisgarh
- Chhattisgarh Pradesh Congress Committee
- Indian general election, 2009 (Chhattisgarh)
- Indian general election, 2014 (Chhattisgarh)

=== Branches of the government ===
- Government of Chhattisgarh

==== Executive branch of the government ====
- Head of state: Governor of Chhattisgarh,
- Head of government: Chief Minister of Chhattisgarh,
- Council of Ministers of Chhattisgarh

==== Legislative branch of the government ====
- Chhattisgarh Legislative Assembly
- Constituencies of Chhattisgarh Legislative Assembly

==== Judicial branch of the government ====
- High Court of Chhattisgarh

=== Law and order ===
- Law enforcement in Chhattisgarh
  - Chhattisgarh Police

== History ==
- History of Chhattisgarh

=== History by period ===
==== Ancient Chhattisgarh ====
- Jogimara and Sitabenga Caves
- Dakshina Kosala kingdom

==== Medieval Chhattisgarh ====
- Kalachuris of Ratnapura
- Haihaiyavanshi kingdom
- Bastar State

==== Colonial Chhattisgarh ====
- Chhattisgarh Division

== Culture ==
- Cuisine of Chhattisgarh
- Languages of Chhattisgarh
- Monuments in Chhattisgarh
  - Monuments of National Importance in Chhattisgarh
  - State Protected Monuments in Chhattisgarh
- World Heritage Sites in Chhattisgarh
- Pandit Sunderlal Sharma Literature Award

=== Art ===
- Music of Chhattisgarh

=== Religion ===
Religion in Chhattisgarh

- Christianity in Chhattisgarh
- Hinduism in Chhattisgarh

=== Sports ===
Sports in Chhattisgarh

- Cricket in Chhattisgarh
  - Chhattisgarh Cricket Association
  - Chhattisgarh cricket team
- Football in Chhattisgarh
  - Chhattisgarh Football Association
  - Chhattisgarh football team

=== Symbols ===
Symbols of Chhattisgarh

- State animal:
- State bird:
- State flower:
- State symbol:
- State tree: sal

== Economy and infrastructure ==
- Tourism in Chhattisgarh

== Education ==
Education in Chhattisgarh

- Institutions of higher education in Chhattisgarh

== Health ==
Health in Chhattisgarh

== See also ==
- Outline of India
