= Raman Singh ministry =

Raman Singh ministry may refer to:

- First Raman Singh ministry the government of Chhattisgarh headed by Raman Singh from 2003 to 2008
- Second Raman Singh ministry the government of Chhattisgarh headed by Raman Singh from December 2008 to December 2013
- Third Raman Singh ministry the government of Chhattisgarh headed by Raman Singh from December 2013 to December 2018
