= Yudhvir Singh Judeo =

Indian politician (1982–2021)

Member of Chhattisgarh Legislative Assembly
- In office 8 December 2008 – 11 December 2018
- Preceded by: Nobel Kumar Verma, NCP
- Succeeded by: Ram Kumar Yadav, INC
- Constituency: Chandrapur

Personal details
- Born: 1 March 1982 Ratlam, Madhya Pradesh, India
- Died: 20 September 2021 (aged 39) Bangalore, Karnataka, India
- Party: Bharatiya Janata Party
- Spouse: Sanyogita Singh Judeo
- Children: 1
- Parent: Dilip Singh Judeo (father)
- Profession: Politician

Yudhvir Singh Judeo (1 March 1982 – 20 September 2021) was an Indian politician and son of former Union Minister and BJP Leader Kumar Dilip Singh Judeo. He was a Member of Chhattisgarh Legislative Assembly for the Chandrapur constituency from 2008 to 2018. He was a scion of the Jashpur Royal Family.

== Political career ==
Judeo was first elected to the Chhattisgarh Legislative Assembly from Chandrapur constituency in 2008 and became Parliamentary secretary in Raman Singh's Government. Also he got re-elected in the 2013 assembly election and became chairman of Chhattisgarh state beverages corporation (cabinet minister rank).

== Personal life ==
Yudhvir Singh Judeo was married to Rajkumari Sanyogita Singh Judeo, daughter of Majhale Raja Sawai Ashit Varn Singh Judeo and Rani Anjana Singh of erstwhile Ajaigarh State on 25 February 2012 from Constitution Club of India in New Delhi. The couple had a daughter Kumari Udhyanjana Singh Judeo born on 1 May 2013. He died on 20 September 2021 at the age of 39. He was suffering from a liver-related ailment for years and was under treatment for the last one month prior to his death.
