= Chandrapur, Chhattisgarh Assembly constituency =

Legislative Assembly constituency in Chhattisgarh State, India

Coordinates: 21.71°N 83.23°E

Chandrapur
- Constituency No. 36 for the Chhattisgarh Legislative Assembly

Constituency details
- Country: India
- Region: Central India
- State: Chhattisgarh
- District: Sakti
- Lok Sabha constituency: Janjgir-Champa
- Established: 1977
- Total electors: 234,099
- Reservation: None

Member of Legislative Assembly
- 6th Chhattisgarh Legislative Assembly
- Incumbent Ram Kumar Yadav
- Party: Indian National Congress
- Elected year: 2018

Chandrapur is one of the 90 Legislative Assembly constituencies of Chhattisgarh state in India. It is in Sakti district.

Previously, Chandrapur was part of Madhya Pradesh Legislative Assembly until state of Chhattisgarh was created, in 2000.

== Member of Legislative Assembly ==
Election	Name	Party
Madhya Pradesh Legislative Assembly
Prior to 1956: part of Chandrapur Birra Assembly constituency
1957	Sashibhushan Singh	Independent politician
1957	Vedram	Indian National Congress
1962	Dhansai	Indian National Congress
1967	Bhawani Lal Verma	Indian National Congress
1972	Bhawani Lal Verma	Indian National Congress
1977	Bhawani Lal Verma	Indian National Congress
1980	Bhawani Lal Verma	Indian National Congress
1985	Bhawani Lal Verma	Indian National Congress
1990	Dushyant Kumar Singh Judev	Bharatiya Janata Party
1993	Nobel Kumar Verma	Indian National Congress
1998	Rani Ratnamala Devi	Bharatiya Janata Party
Chhattisgarh Legislative Assembly
2003	Nobel Kumar Verma	Nationalist Congress Party
2008	Yudhvir Singh Judev	Bharatiya Janata Party
2013	Yudhvir Singh Judev	Bharatiya Janata Party
2018	Ram Kumar Yadav	Indian National Congress
2023	Ram Kumar Yadav	Indian National Congress

== Election results ==
=== 2023 ===
Chhattisgarh Legislative Assembly Election, 2023: Chandrapur
Party	Candidate	Votes	%	±%
INC	Ram Kumar Yadav	85,525	48.48	+16.52
BJP	Bahu Rani Samyogita Singh Judev	69,549	39.42	+14.93
BSP	Lalsai Khunte	16,898	9.68	−19.55
NOTA	None of the Above	1,028	0.58	+0.24
Majority		15,976	9.06	+6.33
Turnout		176,429	75.37	−0.01
INC hold		Swing		

=== 2018 ===
Chhattisgarh Legislative Assembly Election, 2018: Chandrapur
Party	Candidate	Votes	%	±%
INC	Ram Kumar Yadav	51,717	31.96	
BSP	Gitanjali Patel	47,299	29.23	
BJP	Bahu Rani Samyogita Singh Judev	39,638	24.49	
NCP	Suman Novel Verma	14,429	8.92	
Independent	Rajkumar Yadav	1,779	1.10	
NOTA	None of the Above	550	0.34	
Majority		4,418	2.73	
Turnout		161,830	75.38	
INC gain from BJP		Swing		

== See also ==
- Sakti District
- List of constituencies of Chhattisgarh Legislative Assembly
