= Paras Ram Bhardwaj =

Indian politician

Parasram Bhardwaj

Member of Parliament for Sarangarh
- In office 1980–1999
- Preceded by: Govindram Miri
- Succeeded by: P.R. Khute

Personal details
- Born: 1 October 1947 Tiwari, Para-Kharod, Bilaspur district
- Died: 19 October 2015 (aged 68)
- Party: Indian National Congress
- Education: B.A.
- Alma mater: Lakshmaneshwar College, Kharod
- Occupation: Politician
- As of 13 June, 2018 Source: ["Biographical Sketch". Lok Sabha.]

Paras Ram Bhardwaj (1 October 1948 – 19 October 2015) was an Indian politician and a member of the 12th Lok Sabha representing Sarangarh (Lok Sabha constituency) of Madhya Pradesh State till 2000 and from Chhattisgarh State later.

He was elected as a member of the 7th, 8th, 9th, 10th and 11th Lok Sabha of India Parliament.

Parasram Bhardwaj died on 19 October 2015 due to cardiac arrest.
