= Punnulal Mohle =

Indian politician (born 1952)

Member of Chhattisgarh Legislative Assembly
- Incumbent
- Assumed office 8 December 2008
- Preceded by: Chandrabhan
- Constituency: Mungeli

Minister of Food & Civil Supplies Government of Chhattisgarh
- In office 22 December 2008 – 11 December 2018
- Chief Minister: Raman Singh
- Succeeded by: Amarjeet Bhagat

Member of Parliament, Lok Sabha
- In office 1996–2008
- Preceded by: Khelan Ram Jangde
- Succeeded by: Dilip Singh Judeo
- Constituency: Bilaspur

Member of Madhya Pradesh Legislative Assembly
- In office 1985–1996
- Preceded by: Shiv Prasad
- Succeeded by: Chowadas Khandekar
- Constituency: Jarhagaon

Personal details
- Born: Punnulal Mohle; 2 January 1952 (age 74) Dashrangpur, Bilaspur, Madhya Pradesh, India (now Chhattisgarh, India)
- Party: Bharatiya Janata Party
- Spouse(s): Late Chandrika Devi (m. 1960; death 1975) Dwarika Mohale (m.1975)
- Children: 7 sons and 5 daughters
- Parents: Mahetara Mohale (father); Samunda Bai Mohale (mother)
- Education: Bachelor of Arts
- Alma mater: S.N.G. College, Mungeli

Punnulal Mohle (born 2 January 1952) is an Indian politician from Chhattisgarh and a member of the Bharatiya Janata Party. He is a member of Chhattisgarh Legislative Assembly from Mungeli. He was Minister of Food, Civil Supply, Consumer Protection in Government of Chhattisgarh. Prior to becoming Minister, he also represented Bilaspur in Lok Sabha and was a legislator in Madhya Pradesh Legislative Assembly.

He never lost any election after becoming a legislator in Madhya Pradesh Legislative Assembly.

== Early life and education ==
Mohle was born in Dashrangpur, Bilaspur district, in undivided Madhya Pradesh. He pursued his higher education at S.N.G. College, Mungeli, where he obtained a Bachelor of Arts degree.

== Political career ==
Mohle's political journey began at the grassroots level as a Sarpanch in Sodhaar in the late 1970s before being elected as the President of the Janpad Panchayat in Mungeli.

=== Madhya Pradesh Assembly (1985–1996) ===
He was first elected to the Madhya Pradesh Legislative Assembly in 1985 from the Jarhagaon constituency. He successfully defended his seat in the 1990 and 1993 elections before transitioning to national politics.

=== Lok Sabha (1996–2008) ===
Mohle represented the Bilaspur seat in the Lok Sabha for four consecutive terms. He won elections in 1996, 1998, 1999, and 2004. During his parliamentary tenure, he was a member of committees on Industry and Petroleum.

=== Ministerial Tenure (2008–2018) ===
After the formation of Chhattisgarh, he returned to state politics in 2008. He served as the Minister of Food, Civil Supplies, and Consumer Protection in the Second Raman Singh ministry and the Third Raman Singh ministry. He held additional portfolios including Cooperatives and the 20-Point Programme implementation.

=== 2023 Assembly Election ===
In the 2023 elections, Mohle secured his seventh term as an MLA by winning the Mungeli seat. His victory contributed to the BJP's absolute majority in the state assembly.

== Social and community work ==
Mohle is a prominent leader of the Satnami community in Chhattisgarh. He has been involved in several social organizations, focusing on educational empowerment and securing government aid for rural industries.

== Electoral history ==
Election	House	Constituency	Result	Party
1985	Madhya Pradesh Legislative Assembly	Jarhagaon	Won	BJP
1990	Madhya Pradesh Legislative Assembly	Jarhagaon	Won	BJP
1993	Madhya Pradesh Legislative Assembly	Jarhagaon	Won	BJP
1996	Lok Sabha	Bilaspur	Won	BJP
1998	Lok Sabha	Bilaspur	Won	BJP
1999	Lok Sabha	Bilaspur	Won	BJP
2004	Lok Sabha	Bilaspur	Won	BJP
2008	Chhattisgarh Legislative Assembly	Mungeli	Won	BJP
2013	Chhattisgarh Legislative Assembly	Mungeli	Won	BJP
2018	Chhattisgarh Legislative Assembly	Mungeli	Won	BJP
2023	Chhattisgarh Legislative Assembly	Mungeli	Won	BJP

== Positions held ==
Punnulal Mohle has been elected 7 times as MLA and 4 times as Lok Sabha MP.

#	From	To	Position	Party
1.	1985	1990	MLA (1st term) in Madhya Pradesh Legislative Assembly from Jarhagaon	BJP
2.	1990	1993	MLA (2nd term) in Madhya Pradesh Legislative Assembly from Jarhagaon	BJP
3.	1993	1996	MLA (3rd term) in Madhya Pradesh Legislative Assembly from Jarhagaon (resigned in 1996)	BJP
4.	1996	1998	MP (1st term) in 11th Lok Sabha from Bilaspur	BJP
5.	1998	1999	MP (2nd term) in 12th Lok Sabha from Bilaspur	BJP
6.	1999	2004	MP (3rd term) in 13th Lok Sabha from Bilaspur	BJP
7.	2004	2008	MP (4th term) in 14th Lok Sabha from Bilaspur (resigned in 2008)	BJP
8.	2008	2013	MLA (4th term) in Chhattisgarh Assembly from Mungeli; Cabinet Minister (Food, Civil Supplies & Consumer Protection) in Government of Chhattisgarh	BJP
9.	2013	2018	MLA (5th term) in Chhattisgarh Assembly from Mungeli; Cabinet Minister (Food, Civil Supplies, Village Industry & 20-Point Programme)	BJP
10.	2018	2023	MLA (6th term) in Chhattisgarh Assembly from Mungeli	BJP
11.	2023	Present	MLA (7th term) in Chhattisgarh Assembly from Mungeli	BJP
