= Ganeshram =

Indian politician

Ganeshram was an Indian politician from the state of the Madhya Pradesh. He represented Masturi Vidhan Sabha constituency of undivided Madhya Pradesh Legislative Assembly by winning General election of 1957.
