= Ratnamala =

Ratnamala may refer to:

== People ==
- Ratnamala (actress) (1924–1989), Indian actress
- Rani Ratnamala Devi, Indian politician
- Rathnamala Prakash (born 1952), Indian singer
- Ratnamala Savanur (born 1950), Indian politician

== Other uses ==
- Ratnamala (film), a 1947 Indian Telugu-language film

== See also ==
- Ratna (disambiguation)
- Mala (disambiguation)
