= Rajnandgaon Assembly constituency =

Legislative Assembly constituency in Chhattisgarh State, India

Coordinates: 21.1°N 81.03°E

Rajnandgaon
- Constituency No. 75 for the Chhattisgarh Legislative Assembly

Constituency details
- Country: India
- Region: Central India
- State: Chhattisgarh
- District: Rajnandgaon
- Lok Sabha constituency: Rajnandgaon
- Established: 1967
- Total electors: 211,705
- Reservation: None

Member of Legislative Assembly
- 6th Chhattisgarh Legislative Assembly
- Incumbent Raman Singh
- Party: Bharatiya Janata Party
- Elected year: 2023
- Preceded by: Uday Mudliyar

Rajnandgaon is one of the 90 Legislative Assembly constituencies of Chhattisgarh state in India. It is in Rajnandgaon district and is a segment of Rajnandgaon Lok Sabha constituency.

== Member of Legislative Assembly ==
Year	Member	Party
Madhya Pradesh Legislative Assembly
1967	Kishorilal Shukla	Indian National Congress
1972	Kishorilal Shukla	Indian National Congress
1977	Thakur Darbar Singh	Janata Party
1980	Kishorilal Shukla	Indian National Congress (I)
1985	Balbir Khanuja	Indian National Congress
1990	Lilaram Bhojwani	Bharatiya Janata Party
1993	Uday Mudliyar	Indian National Congress
1998	Lilaram Bhojwani	Bharatiya Janata Party
Chhattisgarh Legislative Assembly
2003	Uday Mudliyar	Indian National Congress
2008	Raman Singh	Bharatiya Janata Party
2013	Raman Singh	Bharatiya Janata Party
2018	Raman Singh	Bharatiya Janata Party
2023	Raman Singh	Bharatiya Janata Party

== Election results ==
=== 2023 ===
2023 Chhattisgarh Legislative Assembly election: Rajnandgaon
Party	Candidate	Votes	%	±%
BJP	Raman Singh	102,499	61.21	▲9.52
INC	Girish Dewangan	57,415	34.29	▼6.54
Independent	Makhan Yadav	1,039	0.62	New
NOTA	None of the Above	995	0.59	▼0.37
Majority		45,084	26.92	▲16.06
Turnout		167,463	79.10	▲0.12
BJP hold		Swing		

=== 2018 ===
Chhattisgarh Legislative Assembly Election, 2018: Rajnandgaon
Party	Candidate	Votes	%	±%
BJP	Raman Singh	80,589	51.69	
INC	Karuna Shukla	63,656	40.83	
JCC	Deepak Yadav	1,858	1.19	
Independent	Kailash Shrivastava	1,782	1.14	
Independent	Dr. Uday Ratre	1,093	0.70	
NOTA	None of the Above	1,501	0.96	
Majority		16,933	10.86	
Turnout		1,56,120	78.98	
BJP hold		Swing		

=== 2008 ===
- Raman Singh (BJP) : 77,230 votes
- Uday Mudliyar (INC) : 44,841 votes

== See also ==
- Rajnandgaon district
- List of constituencies of Chhattisgarh Legislative Assembly
