= Niranjan Prasad Kesharwani =

Indian politician (1930–1994)

Member of Parliament, Lok Sabha
- In office 1977–1980
- Preceded by: Ram Gopal Tiwari
- Succeeded by: Godil Prasad Anuragi
- Constituency: Bilaspur

Personal details
- Born: 13 June 1930 Jhalmal Village, Bemetra Tehsil, Durg District, British India (now in Chhattisgarh, India)
- Died: 8 February 1994 (aged 63) New Delhi, India
- Party: Janata Party
- Other political affiliations: Bharatiya Jana Sangh

Niranjan Prasad Kesharwani (13 June 1930 – 8 February 1994) was an Indian politician. He was elected to the Lok Sabha, the lower house of the Parliament of India, as a member of the Janata Party. Kesharwani died in New Delhi on 8 February 1994, at the age of 63.
