= Prabhat Kumar Mishra =

Indian politician

Member of Parliament, Lok Sabha
- In office 1984–1989
- Preceded by: R.G. Tiwari
- Succeeded by: Dilip Singh Judeo
- Constituency: Janjgir-Champa

Personal details
- Born: 4 January 1957
- Died: 2004 (aged 46–47)
- Party: Indian National Congress

Prabhat Kumar Mishra is an Indian politician. He was elected to the Lok Sabha, lower house of the Parliament of India as a member of the Indian National Congress.
