= Bisahu Das Mahant =

Indian politician

MLA
- In office 1952–1957
- Constituency: Naya Baradwar
- In office 1957–1967
- Constituency: Nawagarh
- In office 1967–1978
- Constituency: Champa

Personal details
- Born: April 1, 1924 Saragaon, District. Janjgir Champa (Chhattisgarh)
- Died: 23 July 1978 (aged 54) Saragaon, District. Janjgir Champa (Chhattisgarh)
- Party: INC (Indian National Congress)
- Spouse: Janki Devi
- Children: 2 Sons Charan Das Mahant, Rajesh Mahant & 4 Daughters
- Occupation: Reader, Writer, public intellectual, agriculturist
- As of 26 June, 2016 Source: ["Biography". Veethi Com.]

Bisahu Das Mahant (1 April 1924 – 23 July 1978) was an Indian politician for Madhya Pradesh. He was among most successful MLA ever produced by congress in the state and he represented Baraduwar now known as Naya Baradwar, Nawagarh and Champa for one, two and three terms respectively for the constituencies. He contested and won Baraduwar in 1952 Nawagarh in 1957 and 1962 and Champa in the year 1967, 1972 and 1977 in Vidhan Sabha elections. He never lost election since he started winning in 1952, he was elected to six consecutive terms until he died, he was bed-ridden for very long duration and finally died due to cardiac arrest.

== Childhood ==
He was born in Village Saragaon in the Jangir Champa District of Chhattisgarh. He was born in small farmer's family; nobody expected that he could join politics. Later not only he joined politics but won elections and played a vital role for congress in state elections for Bhopal state and later Madhya Pradesh.

== Freedom fighting and education ==
In between 1942 and 1947 in his college life he fought against the British and because of that the government taken action against him and also rejected his scholarship.

== Family ==
BD Mahant married Janki Devi and had two sons and four daughters from his marriage: Charan Das Mahant and Rajesh Mahant. Charan Das Mahant entered politics and got elected for Vidhan Sabha and Lok sabha and became Cabinet minister state and also held many important positions in Government of India.
