= Janjgir-Champa Assembly constituency =

Legislative Assembly constituency in Chhattisgarh State, India

Coordinates: 22.03°N 82.62°E

Janjgir-Champa
- Constituency No. 34 for the Chhattisgarh Legislative Assembly

Constituency details
- Country: India
- Region: Central India
- State: Chhattisgarh
- District: Janjgir-Champa
- Lok Sabha constituency: Janjgir-Champa
- Established: 2008
- Total electors: 212,602
- Reservation: None

Member of Legislative Assembly
- 6th Chhattisgarh Legislative Assembly
- Incumbent Byas Kashyap
- Party: Indian National Congress
- Elected year: 2023

Janjgir-Champa is one of the 90 Legislative Assembly constituencies of Chhattisgarh state in India. It is in Janjgir-Champa district.

== Members of the Legislative Assembly ==
Year	Member	Party
Until 2008: Constituency did not exist
2008	Narayan Chandel	Bharatiya Janata Party
2013	Moti Lal Devangan	Indian National Congress
2018	Narayan Chandel	Bharatiya Janata Party
2023	Vyas Kashyap	Indian National Congress

== Election results ==
=== 2023 ===
Chhattisgarh Legislative Assembly Election, 2023: Janjgir-Champa
Party	Candidate	Votes	%	±%
INC	Vyas Kashyap	72,900	45.62	+11.73
BJP	Narayan Chandel	65,929	41.26	+4.53
BSP	Radheshyam Suryavanshi	11,668	7.30	−15.47
AAP	Dharamdas Bhargav	3,820	1.18	+0.13
JCC	Ravindra Dwivedi	1,522	0.95	
NOTA	None of the Above	727	0.45	−0.39
Majority		6,971	4.36	+1.52
Turnout		159,801	75.16	+2.81
INC gain from BJP		Swing		

=== 2018 ===
Chhattisgarh Legislative Assembly Election, 2018: Janjgir-Champa
Party	Candidate	Votes	%	±%
BJP	Narayan Chandel	54,040	36.73	
INC	Motilal Dewangan	49,852	33.89	
BSP	Byas Narayan Kashyap	33,505	22.77	
AAP	Sanjay Kumar Sharma	1,538	1.05	
CPI	Sudhir Yadav	1,422	0.97	
NOTA	None of the Above	1,240	0.84	
Majority		4,188	2.84	
Turnout		147,119	72.35	
BJP gain from INC		Swing		

== See also ==
- List of constituencies of the Chhattisgarh Legislative Assembly
- Janjgir-Champa district
