= Dilip Lahariya =

Indian politician

Member of Chhattisgarh Legislative Assembly
- Incumbent
- Assumed office 2023
- Preceded by: Krishnamurti Bandhi
- Constituency: Masturi
- In office 2018–2013
- Preceded by: Krishnamurti Bandhi
- Succeeded by: Krishnamurti Bandhi
- Constituency: Masturi

Personal details
- Party: Indian National Congress

Dilip Lahariya (born 1969) is an Indian politician from Chhattisgarh. He is a two time MLA from Masturi Assembly constituency, which is reserved for Scheduled Caste community, in Bilaspur district. He won the 2023 Chhattisgarh Legislative Assembly election, representing the Indian National Congress.

== Early life and education ==
Lahariya is from Masturi, Bilaspur district, Chhattisgarh. He is the son of late Manohar Lahariya. He passed Class 12 in 1985 and later discontinued his studies.

== Career ==
Lahariya won from Masturi Assembly constituency, representing Indian National Congress, in the 2023 Chhattisgarh Legislative Assembly election. He polled 95,497 votes and defeated his nearest rival, Krishnamurti Bandi of Bharatiya Janata Party, by a margin of 20,141 votes. He first became an MLA winning the 2013 Chhattisgarh Legislative Assembly election, representing the Indian National Congress, defeating Krishnamurthi Bandi, by a margin of 24,146 votes. However, he lost to BJP's Krishnamurthi in the 2018 Assembly election.
