= Bhawani Lal Verma =

Indian politician (1926–2000)

Member of Parliament, Lok Sabha
- In office 1991–1996
- Preceded by: Dilip Singh Judeo
- Succeeded by: Manharan Lal Pandey
- Constituency: Janjgir-Champa

Personal details
- Born: 12 January 1926 Faguram, Bilaspur district, Central Provinces and Berar, British India (now in Chhattisgarh, India)
- Died: 30 December 2000 (aged 74)
- Party: Indian National Congress
- Spouse: Asha Lata
- Children: Five sons and two daughters

Bhawani Lal Verma (12 January 1926 – 30 December 2000) was an Indian politician. He was elected to the Lok Sabha, lower house of the Parliament of India as a member of the Indian National Congress.

During the 1977 Assembly Election, Bhawani lal Verma received 32631 votes while Rameshwar Sharma, the opposition candidate, received 8032 votes for the 125 Chandrapur seat . Bhawani lal Verma prevailed by 24599 votes. Of the legitimate votes cast, he obtained 58.02% of them.

In the 1980 Assembly Election , he received 33828 votes against Maniya Ram's 3446 votes. With 74.52% of the total valid ballots, he had won by 30342 votes.

In both the 1977 and 1980 undivided Madhya Pradesh assembly elections, Bhawani Lal Verma received the highest margin of victory among all candidates.

Bhawani Lal Verma was a state minister three times while Madhya Pradesh was still an undivided state and has served as a member of the legislature (MLA) five times.

Bhawani Lal Verma died on 30 December 2000, at the age of 74. One of his sons, Dr. Vinod Kumar Verma, has worked in the field of linguistics.

His son Dr. Vinod Kumar Verma has co-authored several books on Hindi and Chhattisgarhi grammar with Dr. Vinay Kumar Pathak, including Hindi ka Sampurna Vyakaran, Chhattisgarhi ka Sampurna Vyakaran, and Chhattisgarhi Vyakaran.

His Another Son, Novel Kumar Verma won the Assembly Elections in 1993 and 2003 from the Chandrapur constituency. Also, he has served in the capacity of state minister in year 1998
