= Vyas Kashyap =

Indian politician

Vyas Narayan Kashyap (born 1966) is an Indian politician from Chhattisgarh. He is an MLA from Janjgir Champa Assembly constituency in Janjgir Champa district. He won the 2023 Chhattisgarh Legislative Assembly election, representing the Indian National Congress.

== Early life and education ==
Kashyap is from Janjgir Champa, Chhattisgarh. He is the son of Shaniram Kashyap. He completed his graduation in arts, in 1989, at Guru Ghasidas University, Bilaspur.

== Career ==
Kashyap won from Janjgir Champa Assembly constituency representing the Indian National Congress in the 2023 Chhattisgarh Legislative Assembly election. He polled 72,900 votes and defeated his nearest rival, Narayan Chandel of the Bharatiya Janata Party, by a margin of 6,971 votes.
