= Khelan Ram Jangde =

Indian politician (1946–2021)

Member of Parliament, Lok Sabha
- In office 1991–1996
- Preceded by: Resham Lal Jangde
- Succeeded by: Punnulal Mohle
- In office 1984–1989
- Preceded by: Godil Prasad Anuragi
- Succeeded by: Resham Lal Jangde
- Constituency: Bilaspur

Personal details
- Born: 15 July 1946 Phulwari Khurd, Bilaspur State, British India (now in Chhattisgarh, India)
- Died: 30 April 2021 (aged 74)
- Party: Indian National Congress
- Spouse: Sahastra Bai

Dr. Khelan Ram Jangde (15 July 1946 – 30 April 2021) was an Indian politician.

He was elected to the Lok Sabha, lower house of the Parliament of India as a member of the Indian National Congress.

Jangde died on 30 April 2021 from COVID-19.
