= Reshamlal Jangade =

Indian politician (1925–2014)

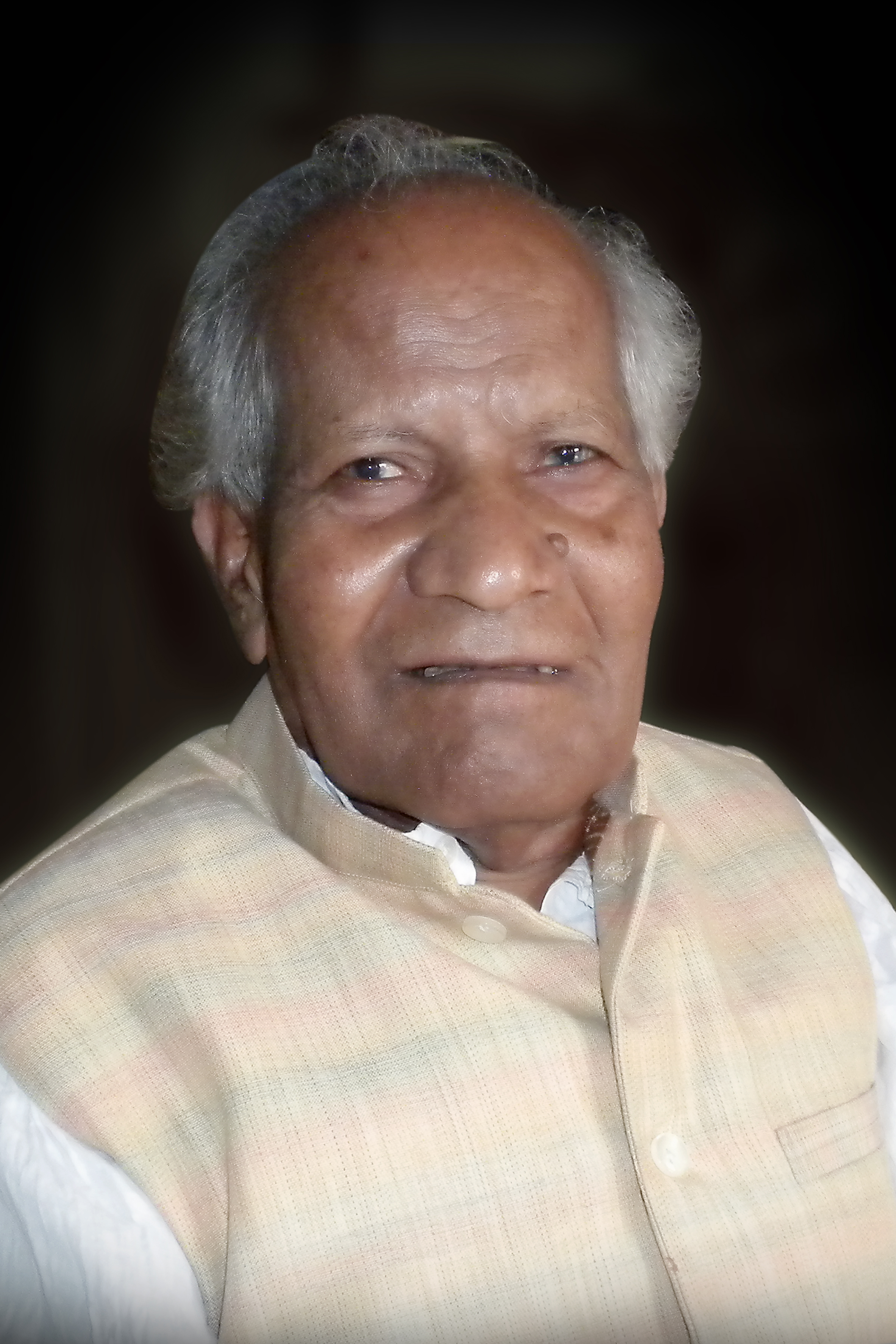

Member of Parliament, Lok Sabha
- In office 1989–1991
- Preceded by: Khelan Ram Jangde
- Succeeded by: Khelan Ram Jangde
- Constituency: Bilaspur
- In office 1952–1962
- Preceded by: Constituency established
- Succeeded by: Chandrabhan Singh
- Constituency: Bilaspur

Member of Madhya Pradesh Legislative Assembly
- In office 1985–1989
- Preceded by: Kumar Bhatiya
- Succeeded by: Haridas Bhardwaj
- Constituency: Bhatgaon
- In office 1972–1977
- Preceded by: P. Mangliram
- Succeeded by: Kanhaiyalal Kasoriya
- Constituency: Bhatgaon
- In office 1962–1967
- Preceded by: Jitendra Vijay Bahadur
- Succeeded by: P. Mangliram
- Constituency: Bhatgaon

Personal details
- Born: 15 February 1925 Parsadih, Raipur district
- Died: 11 August 2014 (aged 89) Raipur, Chhattisgarh
- Party: Bharatiya Janata Party
- Spouse: Kamla (m. 1958)
- Children: 3 sons, 3 daughters
- Parent: Tika Ram Jangde (father)
- Education: Bachelor of Arts; Bachelor of Laws
- Alma mater: Chhatisgarh Arts College; University College of Law, Nagpur

Reshamlal Jangade (1925-2014) was an Indian Lawyer and politician from Chhattisgarh.

== Career ==
Jangde was born in a Dalit Satnami family in Chhattisgarh to Tikaram Jangade. He was a law graduate from Nagpur and being a Scheduled Caste, he had contested from a general seat to make it to the 1st Lok Sabha in 1952 from Bilaspur as a Congressman. He was re-elected from Bilaspur in 1957. He was also a member of the Provisional Parliament that preceded the first Lok Sabha between 1950 and 1952. In 1962 he was elected to the Madhya Pradesh Legislative Assembly from Bhatgaon and was re-elected again in 1972. After 80's he quit the Congress and joined the Bharatiya Janata Party. He was elected to Madhya Pradesh Legislative Assembly from Bhatgaon in 1985 on BJP ticket and was again elected to Lok Sabha in 1989 from Bilaspur for the last time.

=== Committee Experience ===
House	Committee	Year
Lok Sabha	Member, Estimates Committee	1957–58
Lok Sabha	Select Committee on Code of Criminal Procedure Amendment Bill	1959
MP Legislative Assembly	Chairman, Committee on Private Members' Bills and Resolutions	1974-75
MP Legislative Assembly	Member, Public Accounts Committee	1974-75
MP Legislative Assembly	Member, Estimates Committee,	1985-86
MP Legislative Assembly	Committee of Privileges	1987
MP Legislative Assembly	Committee on the Welfare of SC & ST	1987-88
MP Legislative Assembly	Committee on Questions References	1988
MP Legislative Assembly	Rules Committee	1989
Lok Sabha	Member, Committee on Papers Laid on the Table	1990
Lok Sabha	Consultative Committee, Ministry of Law & Justice	1990
