= Sarangarh Lok Sabha constituency =

Former constituency of the Indian parliament in Chhattisgarh

Coordinates: 21.6°N 83.1°E

Sarangarh
- Former Lok Sabha constituency

Constituency details
- Country: India
- Region: Central India
- State: Chhattisgarh
- Assembly constituencies: Saria, Sarangarh, Pamgarh, Malkharoda, Chandrapur, Pallari, Kasdol and Bhatgaon
- Established: 1977
- Abolished: 2009
- Reservation: None

Sarangarh was a Lok Sabha (parliamentary) constituency in Chhattisgarh state in central India. It was dissolved in 2009.

== Assembly segments ==
Sarangarh Lok Sabha constituency comprised the following assembly segments:

1. Saria
2. Sarangarh
3. Pamgarh
4. Malkharoda
5. Chandrapur
6. Pallari
7. Kasdol
8. Bhatgaon

== Members of Parliament ==
- 1952-76: Constituency does not exist
- 1977: Govindram Miri, Janata Party
- 1980: Paras Ram Bhardwaj, Indian National Congress
- 1984: Paras Ram Bhardwaj, Indian National Congress
- 1989: Paras Ram Bhardwaj, Indian National Congress
- 1991: Paras Ram Bhardwaj, Indian National Congress
- 1996: Paras Ram Bhardwaj, Indian National Congress
- 1998: Paras Ram Bhardwaj, Indian National Congress
- 1999: P.R. Khute, Bharatiya Janata Party
- 2004: Guharam Ajgalle, Bharatiya Janata Party
- 2008 Onwards: Constituency does not exist

See Korba (Lok Sabha constituency)

== See also ==
- Raigarh district
- List of former constituencies of the Lok Sabha
