= Manharan Lal Pandey =

Indian politician (1938–2013)

Member of Parliament, Lok Sabha
- In office 1996–1998
- Preceded by: Bhawani Lal Verma
- Succeeded by: Charan Das Mahant
- Constituency: Janjgir–Champa

Minister of State Government of Madhya Pradesh
- In office 1977–1980
- Chief Minister: Kailash Joshi; Virendra Saklecha; Sunder Lal Patwa
- Department: Home, Irrigation & Health
- In office 1968–1969
- Chief Minister: Govind Narayan Singh
- Department: Electricity

Member of Madhya Pradesh Legislative Assembly
- In office 1985–1996
- Preceded by: Taherbai
- Succeeded by: Jagjeet Singh Makkad
- Constituency: Takhatpur
- In office 1977–1980
- Preceded by: Rohani Kumar
- Succeeded by: Taherbai
- Constituency: Takhatpur
- In office 1967–1972
- Preceded by: Murlidhar Mishra
- Succeeded by: Rohani Kumar
- Constituency: Takhatpur

Personal details
- Born: 27 October 1938 Keshruwadih, Bilaspur, Madhya Pradesh, India (now Chhattisgarh, India)
- Died: 21 January 2013 (aged 74) Raipur, Chhattisgarh, India
- Party: Bhartiya Janata Party
- Other political affiliations: Janata Party (1977-80); Bharatiya Jana Sangh (Before 1977)
- Spouse: Nirmala Pandey (m. 1963)
- Children: 1 Son & 4 Daughters
- Parent: Gangaram Pandey (father)
- Education: Master of Commerce
- Alma mater: Pandit Ravishankar Shukla University
- Profession: Politician, Agriculturist

Manharan Lal Pandey (27 October 1938 - 21 January 2013) was an Indian Politician and Member of Parliament representing Janjgir constituency of Madhya Pradesh (now in Chhattisgarh) in 11th Lok Sabha. He was a member of the Bharatiya Janata Party.

== Career ==
Pandey was first elected to Madhya Pradesh Legislative Assembly in 1967 from Takhatpur on Jan Sangh ticket and became Minister of State for Electricity. In 1972 Election, he lost the seat to Congress Party but won 1977 election on Janata Party ticket and became Minister of State in Kailash Chandra Joshi and Virendra Kumar Sakhlecha ministry. Again, he lost 1980 election but won 1985, 1990 and 1993 election consecutively. He was elected to 11th Lok Sabha in 1996 but lost 1998 General election to Charan Das Mahant of Congress by margin of 44,586 votes.
