= Third Raman Singh ministry =

- 4th Ministry of Chhattisgarh
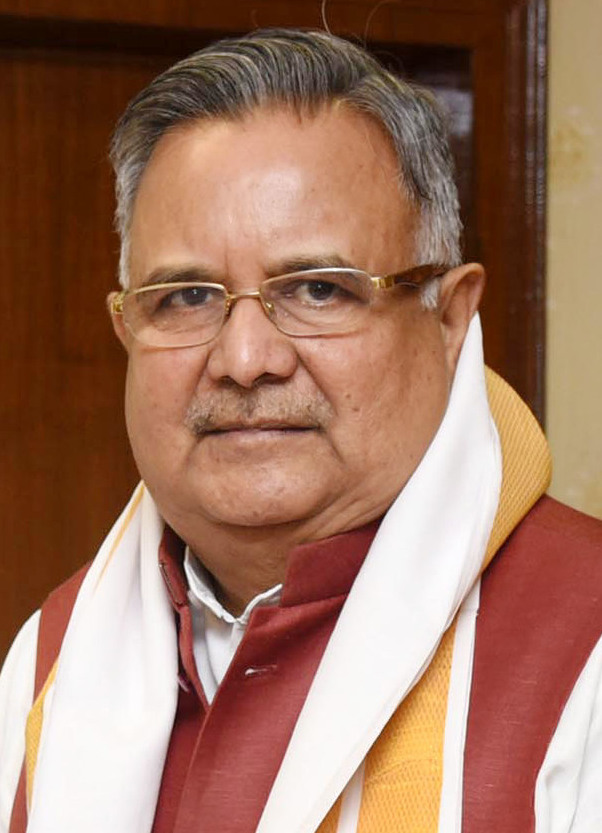
- Raman Singh; Hon'ble Chief Minister of Chhattisgarh
- Date formed: 12 December 2013
- Date dissolved: 11 December 2018

People and organisations
- Governor: Shekhar Dutt; Ram Naresh Yadav; Balaram Das Tandon; Anandiben Patel
- Chief Minister: Raman Singh
- Total no. of members: 12
- Member parties: BJP
- Status in legislature: Majority
- Opposition party: INC
- Opposition leader: T. S. Singh Deo

History
- Election: 2013
- Legislature terms: 4 years, 364 days
- Predecessor: Second Raman Singh ministry
- Successor: Baghel ministry

This is a list of minister from Raman Singh's third cabinet starting from 9 December 2013. Raman Singh is the leader of Bharatiya Janata Party was sworn in the Chief Ministers of Chhattisgarh in December 2003. Here is the list of the ministers of his ministry.

== Council of Ministers ==
Portfolio	Minister	Took office	Left office	Party
Chief Minister; Finance; General Administration; Energy; Mining; Other departments not allocated to any Minister	Raman Singh	12 December 2013	11 December 2018	BJP
Minister of Home; Minister of Public Health Engineering	Ram Sewak Paikra	18 December 2013	11 December 2018	BJP
Minister of Rural Development & Panchayat Raj	Ajay Chandrakar	18 December 2013	11 December 2018	BJP
Minister of Revenue; Minister of Disaster Management & Rehabilitation; Minister of Higher Education & Technical Education; Minister of Science & Technology	Prem Prakash Pandey	18 December 2013	11 December 2018	BJP
Minister of Woman & Child Development; Minister of Social Welfare	Ramshiela Sahu	18 December 2013	11 December 2018	BJP
Minister of Health & Family Welfare; Minister of Medical Education	Amar Agrawal	18 December 2013	22 May 2015	BJP
Minister of Health & Family Welfare; Minister of Medical Education	Ajay Chandrakar	22 May 2015	11 December 2018	BJP
Minister of Labour	Amar Agrawal	18 December 2013	22 May 2015	BJP
Minister of Labour	Bhaiyalal Rajwade	22 May 2015	11 December 2018	BJP
Minister of Urban Administration; Minister of Commercial Taxes	Amar Agrawal	18 December 2013	11 December 2018	BJP
Minister of Commerce & Industry	Raman Singh	18 December 2013	22 May 2015	BJP
Minister of Commerce & Industry	Amar Agrawal	22 May 2015	11 December 2018	BJP
Minister of Water Resources; Minister of Agriculture; Minister of Animal Husbandry & Fisheries; Minister of Religious Trusts & Endowments	Brijmohan Agrawal	18 December 2013	11 December 2018	BJP
Minister of Public Works Department; Minister of Transport; Minister of Housing; Minister of Environment	Rajesh Munat	18 December 2013	11 December 2018	BJP
Minister of Food & Civil Supplies; Minister of Cooperatives; Minister of 20-point programme	Punnulal Mohle	18 December 2013	11 December 2018	BJP
Minister of School Education; Minister of SC, ST, OBC & Minorities Development	Kedar Nath Kashyap	18 December 2013	11 December 2018	BJP
Minister of Law	Raman Singh	18 December 2013	22 May 2015	BJP
Minister of Law	Mahesh Gagda	22 May 2015	11 December 2018	BJP
Minister of Forest
Minister of Forest	Mahesh Gagda	22 May 2015	11 December 2018	BJP
Minister of Sports
Minister of Sports	Bhaiyalal Rajwade	22 May 2015	11 December 2018	BJP
Minister of Tourism & Culture	Ajay Chandrakar	18 December 2013	22 May 2015	BJP
Minister of Tourism & Culture	Dayaldas Baghel	22 May 2015	11 December 2018	BJP

== See also ==
- Government of Chhattisgarh
- Chhattisgarh Legislative Assembly
- Second Raman Singh ministry
- First Raman Singh ministry
