= Paras Nath Rajwade =

Indian politician

Member of the Chhattisgarh Legislative Assembly
- In office 8 December 2013 – 3 December 2023
- Preceded by: Rajni Ravishankar Tripathi
- Succeeded by: Laxmi Rajwade
- Constituency: Bhatgaon

Personal details
- Born: 19 August 1962 (age 64) Village Batra, Surajpur district
- Party: Indian National Congress
- Education: B.A.
- Occupation: Politician
- As of 13 June, 2018 Source: []

Paras Nath Rajwade (born 19 August 1962) is an Indian politician. He was MLA of Bhatgaon, Chhattisgarh from The Indian National Congress.

On 14 July 2020, he became Parliamentary secretary, appointed by Government of Chhattisgarh.

== Political career ==
In the year 2013, he became an MLA in the Chhattisgarh Legislative Assembly for the first time from Bhatgaon (Vidhan Sabha constituency).

== See also ==
- Chhattisgarh Legislative Assembly
- 2013 Chhattisgarh Legislative Assembly election
