= Banwari Lal Agrawal =

Indian politician

Deputy speaker, Chhattisgarh Legislative Assembly
- In office 28 March 2001 – 9 March 2003
- Preceded by: Post Created
- Succeeded by: Dharmjeet Singh Thakur

Member of Legislative Assembly for Katghora
- In office 1993–2003
- Preceded by: Krishnalal Jaiswal
- Succeeded by: Bodhram Kanwar

Personal details
- Born: 1 May 1947 (age 79) Japeli, Korba, Madhya Pradesh, India (now in Chhattisgarh, India)
- Died: 15 October 2025 (aged 78) Korba
- Party: Bharatiya Janata Party
- Spouse: Pushpa Devi
- Children: 1 Son
- Parent: Shridhar Agrawal (Father)
- Profession: Lawyer, Politician

Banwari Lal Agrawal (1 May 1947 – 15 October 2025) is an Indian politician and former Member of Legislative Assembly for Katghora Constituency of Chhattisgarh (erstwhile in Madhya Pradesh). He is a member of Bharatiya Janata Party.

== Career ==
Banwari Lal first contested 1993 Assembly election and defeated Krishnalal Jaiswal of INC by a margin of 7,414 votes and also got re-elected in 1998 Assembly election by defeating Jai Singh Agrawal of Congress from same constituency. After bifurcation of Chhattisgarh from Madhya Pradesh, he again contested 2003 Assembly election from Katghora Constituency against Senior Congress leader Bodhhram Kanwar but lost. Again, he contested 2008 Assembly election from Korba against Jai Singh Agrawal and lost by a margin of only 587 votes.
