= Katghora Assembly constituency =

Legislative Assembly constituency in Chhattisgarh State, India

Coordinates: 22.51°N 82.55°E

Katghora
- Constituency No. 22 for the Chhattisgarh Legislative Assembly

Constituency details
- Country: India
- Region: Central India
- State: Chhattisgarh
- District: Korba
- Lok Sabha constituency: Korba
- Established: 1957
- Total electors: 214,882
- Reservation: None

Member of Legislative Assembly
- 6th Chhattisgarh Legislative Assembly
- Incumbent Premchand Patel
- Party: Bharatiya Janta Party
- Elected year: 2023
- Preceded by: Purushottam Kanwar

Katghora is one of the 90 Legislative Assembly constituencies of Chhattisgarh state in India. It is in Korba district and is a part of Korba (Lok Sabha constituency).

== Members of Legislative Assembly ==
Year	Member	Party
Madhya Pradesh Legislative Assembly
1957	Banwari Lal	Indian National Congress
1957^	Rudrasharan Pratap Singh	Indian National Congress
1962	Rudrasharan Pratap Singh	Indian National Congress
1967	B. Navbatram	Indian National Congress
1972	Bodhram Kanwar	Independent
1977	Bodhram Kanwar	Indian National Congress
1980	Bodhram Kanwar	Indian National Congress
1985	Bodhram Kanwar	Indian National Congress
1990	Krishnalal Jaiswal	Indian National Congress
1993	Banwari Lal Agrawal	Bharatiya Janata Party
1998	Banwari Lal Agrawal	Bharatiya Janata Party
Chhattisgarh Legislative Assembly
2003	Bodhram Kanwar	Indian National Congress
2008	Bodhram Kanwar	Indian National Congress
2013	Lakhan Lal Dewangan	Bharatiya Janata Party
2018	Purushottam Kanwar	Indian National Congress
2023	Premchand Patel	Bharatiya Janata Party

^by-election

== Election results ==
=== 2023 ===
Chhattisgarh Legislative Assembly Election, 2023: Katghora
Party	Candidate	Votes	%	±%
BJP	Premchand Patel	73,680	45.19	+14.20
INC	Purushottam Kanwar	56,780	34.83	−3.63
GGP	Bhuneshwar Singh Shrotey	9,547	5.86	+2.92
BSP	Engineer Satyajeet Kurrey	4900	3.01	New
JCC	Surendra Rathore	4507	2.76	−17.05
AAP	Chandrakant Dixena	3149	1.93	New
CPI(M)	Jawhar Singh Kanwar	2535	1.55	−1.12
NOTA	None of the Above	1,462	0.90	−0.96
Majority		16,900	10.36	+2.89
Turnout		163,032	75.87	−2.06
BJP gain from INC		Swing		

=== 2018 ===
Chhattisgarh Legislative Assembly Election, 2018: Katghora
Party	Candidate	Votes	%	±%
INC	Purushottam Kanwar	59,227	38.46	
BJP	Lakhan Lal Dewangan	47,716	30.99	
JCC	Govind Singh Rajput	30,509	19.81	
GGP	Lalit Manikpuri	4,520	2.94	
CPI(M)	Sapuran Kuldeep	4,113	2.67	
NOTA	None of the Above	2,867	1.86	
Majority		11,511	7.47	
Turnout		153,995	77.93	
INC gain from BJP		Swing		

== See also ==
- List of constituencies of the Chhattisgarh Legislative Assembly
- Korba district
