= Second Raman Singh ministry =

Ministry in Chhattisgarh, India

- 3rd Ministry of Chhattisgarh
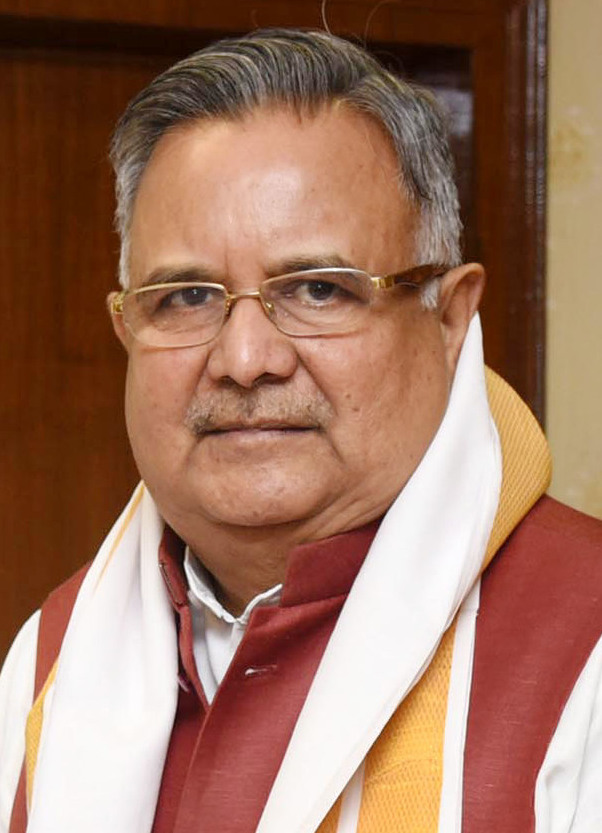
- Raman Singh; Hon'ble Chief Minister of Chhattisgarh
- Date formed: 12 December 2008
- Date dissolved: 12 December 2013

People and organisations
- Governor: E. S. L. Narasimhan; Shekhar Dutt
- Chief Minister: Raman Singh
- Member parties: BJP
- Status in legislature: Majority
- Opposition party: INC
- Opposition leader: Ravindra Choubey

History
- Election: 2008
- Legislature terms: 5 years, 0 days
- Predecessor: First Raman Singh ministry
- Successor: Third Raman Singh ministry

This is a list of minister from Raman Singh's third cabinet starting from December 2008. Raman Singh is the leader of Bharatiya Janata Party was sworn in as the Chief Minister of Chhattisgarh for the second time, in December 2008. Here is the list of the ministers of his ministry.

== Council of Ministers ==
Portfolio	Minister	Took office	Left office	Party
Chief Minister; Finance; General Administration; Energy; Mining; Commerce & Industry; Other departments not allocated to any Minister	Raman Singh	12 December 2008	12 December 2013	BJP
Minister of Home; Minister of Cooperatives	Nanki Ram Kanwar	22 December 2008	12 December 2013	BJP
Minister of Rural Development & Panchayat Raj; Minister of Law	Ramvichar Netam	22 December 2008	12 December 2013	BJP
Minister of Food & Civil Supplies; Minister of Gramodyog and 20-point programme implementation	Punnulal Mohle	22 December 2008	12 December 2013	BJP
Minister of Public Works Department; Minister of School Education; Minister of Parliamentary Affairs; Minister of Tourism & Culture; Minister of Religious Trusts & Endowments	Brijmohan Agrawal	22 December 2008	12 December 2013	BJP
Minister of Revenue; Minister of Health & Medical Education; Minister of Commercial Tax	Amar Agrawal	22 December 2008	12 December 2013	BJP
Minister of Agriculture; Minister of Animal Husbandry & Fisheries; Minister of Labour	Chandra Shekhar Sahu	22 December 2008	12 December 2013	BJP
Minister of Woman & Child Development; Minister of Social Welfare; Minister of Sports & Youth Affairs	Lata Usendi	22 December 2008	12 December 2013	BJP
Minister of Urban Development & Housing; Minister of Transport; Minister of Environment	Rajesh Munat	22 December 2008	12 December 2013	BJP
Minister of Water Resources; Minister of Forest	Vikram Usendi	22 December 2008	12 December 2013	BJP
Minister of Higher Education & Technical Education; Minister of Science & Technology	Hemchand Yadav	22 December 2008	12 December 2013	BJP
Minister of SC, ST, OBC & Minority Welfare; Minister of Public Health Engineering	Kedar Nath Kashyap	22 December 2008	12 December 2013	BJP

== See also ==
- Third Raman Singh ministry
- Bhupesh Baghel ministry
