= Godil Prasad Anuragi =

Indian politician (1928–2021)

Member of Parliament, Lok Sabha
- In office 1980–1984
- Preceded by: Niranjan Prasad Kesharwani
- Succeeded by: Khelan Ram Jangde
- Constituency: Bilaspur

Personal details
- Born: 5 November 1928 Nawapara Village, Ratanpur P.O., Bilaspur State, British India (now in Chhattisgarh, India)
- Died: 19 September 2021 (aged 92)
- Party: Indian National Congress
- Spouse: Shyam Bai

Godil Prasad Anuragi (5 November 1928 – 19 September 2021) was an Indian politician. He was elected to the Lok Sabha, lower house of the Parliament of India as a member of the Indian National Congress.
