= Bhatgaon Assembly constituency =

Constituency of the Chhattisgarh legislative assembly in India

Coordinates: 21.16°N 81.72°E

Bhatgaon
- Constituency No. 5 for the Chhattisgarh Legislative Assembly
- Chhattisgarh assembly election result

Constituency details
- Country: India
- Region: Central India
- State: Chhattisgarh
- Division: Surguja
- District: Surajpur District
- Lok Sabha constituency: Sarguja
- Established: 1951
- Total electors: 236,803
- Reservation: ST

Member of Legislative Assembly
- 6th Chhattisgarh Legislative Assembly
- Incumbent Laxmi Rajwade
- Party: Bharatiya Janata Party
- Elected year: 2023
- Preceded by: Paras Nath Rajwade

Bhatgaon Vidhan Sabha Constituency is one of the 90 Vidhan Sabha (Legislative Assembly) constituencies of Chhattisgarh state in central India. This vidhan sabha consists of 306 division.

== Members of Legislative Assembly ==
| Year | Member | Party |
Madhya Pradesh Legislative Assembly
| 1952 | Laxminarayan Das | Indian National Congress |
| 1957 | Jitendra Vijay Bahadur | Independent |
| 1962 | Reshamlal Jangade | Indian National Congress |
| 1967 | P. Mangliram | Indian National Congress |
| 1972 | Reshamlal Jangade | Indian National Congress |
| 1977 | Kanhaiyalal Kasoriya | Indian National Congress |
| 1980 | Kumar Bhatiya | Indian National Congress |
| 1985 | Reshamlal Jangade | Bharatiya Janata Party |
| 1990 | Haridas Bhardwaj | Bharatiya Janata Party |
| 1993 | Mayaram Negi | Indian National Congress |
| 1998 | Haridas Bhardwaj | Bharatiya Janata Party |
Chhattisgarh Legislative Assembly
| 2003 | Haridas Bhardwaj | Indian National Congress |
| 2008 | Ravi Shankar Tripathi | Bharatiya Janata Party |
| 2010^ | Rajni Ravishankar Tripathi | Bharatiya Janata Party |
| 2013 | Paras Nath Rajwade | Indian National Congress |
| 2018 | Paras Nath Rajwade | Indian National Congress |
| 2023 | Laxmi Rajwade | Bharatiya Janata Party |

^by-election

== Election results ==
=== 2023 ===
2023 Chhattisgarh Legislative Assembly election: Bhatgaon
| Party | Candidate | Votes | % | ±% |
|---|---|---|---|---|
| BJP | Laxmi Rajwade | 105,162 | 54.06 | +19.90 |
| INC | Paras Nath Rajwade | 61,200 | 31.46 | −11.83 |
| BSP | Narendra Sahu | 11,441 | 5.88 | |
| Independent | Paras Rajwade | 2,565 | 1.32 | |
| CPI(M) | Kapil Dev Paikra | 2,018 | 1.04 | |
| JCC | Samaylal Patil | 1,851 | 0.95 | −4.31 |
| NOTA | None of the Above | 637 | 0.33 | −0.24 |
| Majority | | 43,962 | 22.60 | +13.47 |
| Turnout | | 194,531 | 82.15 | +3.62 |
| Registered electors | | 236,803 | | |
| BJP gain from INC | | Swing | | |

=== 2018 ===
2018 Chhattisgarh Legislative Assembly election: Bhatgaon
| Party | Candidate | Votes | % | ±% |
|---|---|---|---|---|
| INC | Paras Nath Rajwade | 74,623 | 43.29 | |
| BJP | Rajni Ravishankar Tripathi | 58,889 | 34.16 | |
| SP | Ram Adheen Poya | 10,050 | 5.83 | |
| JCC | Surendra Choudhary | 9,067 | 5.26 | |
| NOTA | None of the Above | 981 | 0.57 | |
| Majority | | 15,734 | 9.13 | |
| Turnout | | 1,72,373 | 78.53 | |
| INC hold | | Swing | | |

== See also ==
- Telgaon
