= Jarhagaon Assembly constituency =

Constituency of the Chhattisgarh legislative assembly in India

Jarhagaon
- Former constituency for the Chhattisgarh Legislative Assembly

Constituency details
- Country: India
- Region: Central India
- State: Chhattisgarh
- Established: 2003
- Abolished: 2008
- Total electors: 135,797

Jarhagaon Assembly constituency was an assembly constituency in the India state of Chhattisgarh.

== Members of the Legislative Assembly ==
Election	Member	Party
2003	Churawan Mangeshkar	Indian National Congress

== Election results ==
=== Assembly Election 2003 ===
2003 Chhattisgarh Legislative Assembly election : Jarhagaon
Party	Candidate	Votes	%	±%
INC	Churawan Mangeshkar	46,744	51.13%	New
BJP	Chouwadas Khandekar	34,759	38.02%	New
BSP	Shakuntala Mire	3,938	4.31%	New
SP	Rukhmani	3,044	3.33%	New
NCP	Ramkaushal Sonwani	2,936	3.21%	New
Margin of victory		11,985	13.11%	
Turnout		91,421	67.32%	
Registered electors		135,797		
INC win (new seat)				
