= Rani Ratnamala Devi =

Indian politician

Rani Ratnamala Devi was an Indian politician and member of the Indian National Congress. Ratnamala Devi was a member of the Madhya Pradesh Legislative Assembly from the Chandrapur constituency in Janjgir-Champa district on Bharatiya Janata Party ticket.

She was one of the 12 BJP MLA who had defected from the Bhartiya Janata Party and floated a suffix 'Party' called Chhattisgarh Vikas Party in order to avoid anti-defection law and merged into the Indian National Congress the next day.
