= Banshilal Mahto =

Indian politician (1940–2019)

Member of the India Parliament for Korba
- In office 16 May 2014 – 23 May 2019
- Preceded by: Charan Das Mahant
- Succeeded by: Jyotsna Mahant
- Constituency: Korba

Personal details
- Born: 30 June 1940 Salihabhata, Korba, Chhattisgarh
- Died: 23 November 2019 (aged 79)
- Party: Bharatiya Janata Party
- Spouse: Smt. Kaushalya Devi Mahto
- Children: 6
- Occupation: Medical Practitioner, Agriculturist
- As of 12 December, 2016

Banshilal Mahto (30 June 1940 – 23 November 2019) was an Indian politician and a member of parliament to the 16th Lok Sabha from Korba (Lok Sabha constituency), Chhattisgarh. He won the 2014 Indian general election being a Bharatiya Janata Party candidate.
