= Uday Mudliyar =

Indian politician

Uday Mudliyar (31 July 1956 – 25 May 2013) was an Indian politician of Indian National Congress. He was the MLA for Rajnandgaon from 1993 to 1998 and from 2003 to 2008. He died in a Naxal attack in Jhiram Ghati 2013 along with other senior Congress leaders.

== Death ==
On 25 May 2013, he was shot by Naxalites in an attack.
