= Govindram Miri =

Indian politician (born 1944)

Govindram Miri (born 1 September 1944 in Hardi, Bilaspur District) was a member of the 6th Lok Sabha of India. He represented the Sarangarh constituency of Chhattisgarh then Madhya Pradesh as member of Janata Party. He was a member of the Bharatiya Janata Party political party.

He serves as twice as Lok Sabha member from Sarangarh constituency and once as Rajya Sabha member from Madhya Pradesh.
