= Amar Singh Sahgal =

Indian politician

Amar Singh Sahgal (born at Bilaspur, February, 1903 ) was member of 1st Lok Sabha from Bilaspur (Lok Sabha constituency) in Madhya Pradesh State, India. He was member of 4th Lok Sabha from Bilaspur.

He was elected to 2nd and 3rd Lok Sabha from Janjgir (Lok Sabha constituency).
