= Guharam Ajgalle =

Indian politician

Member of Indian Parliament
- In office 23 May 2019 – 4 June 2024
- Preceded by: Kamla Devi Patle
- Succeeded by: Kamlesh Jangre
- Constituency: Janjgir
- In office 2004–2009
- Preceded by: P.R. Khute
- Succeeded by: Constituency abolished
- Constituency: Sarangarh

Personal details
- Born: 30 April 1967 (age 59) Raigarh, Madhya Pradesh, India (now in Chhattisgarh, India)
- Party: Bharatiya Janata Party
- As of 25 September, 2006

Guharam Ajgalle (born 30 April 1967) is an Indian politician and member of the Bharatiya Janata Party. He is member of parliament in the 17th Lok Sabha representing the Janjgir constituency of Chhattisgarh.
