= Masturi Assembly constituency =

Legislative Assembly constituency in Chhattisgarh State, India

Coordinates: 21.99°N 82.27°E

Masturi
- Constituency No. 32 for the Chhattisgarh Legislative Assembly

Constituency details
- Country: India
- Region: Central India
- State: Chhattisgarh
- District: Bilaspur
- Lok Sabha constituency: Bilaspur
- Established: 1957
- Total electors: 305,620
- Reservation: SC

Member of Legislative Assembly
- 6th Chhattisgarh Legislative Assembly
- Incumbent Dilip Lahariya
- Party: Indian National Congress
- Elected year: 2023
- Preceded by: Krishnamurti Bandhi

Masturi is one of the 90 Legislative Assembly constituencies of Chhattisgarh state in India. It is in Bilaspur district and is reserved for candidates belonging to the Scheduled Castes. It is also part of Bilaspur Lok Sabha constituency.

Previously, Masturi was part of Madhya Pradesh Legislative Assembly until the state of Chhattisgarh was created in 2000.

== Members of Legislative Assembly ==
Year	Member	Party
Madhya Pradesh Legislative Assembly
1957	Ganeshram Amant	Independent
1962	Ganeshram Amant	Indian National Congress
1967	Godil Prasad	Indian National Congress
1972	Godil Prasad	Indian National Congress
1977	Banshilal Ghritlahare	Indian National Congress
1980	Banshilal Ghritlahare	Indian National Congress
1985	Banshilal Ghritlahare	Indian National Congress
1990	Madan Singh Daharya	Bharatiya Janata Party
1993	Deo Charan Singh	Indian National Congress
1998	Madan Singh Daharya	Bharatiya Janata Party
Chhattisgarh Legislative Assembly
2003	Krishnamurti Bandhi	Bharatiya Janata Party
2008	Krishnamurti Bandhi	Bharatiya Janata Party
2013	Dilip Lahariya	Indian National Congress
2018	Krishnamurti Bandhi	Bharatiya Janata Party
2023	Dilip Lahariya	Indian National Congress

== Election results ==
=== 2023 ===
Chhattisgarh Legislative Assembly Election, 2023: Masturi
Party	Candidate	Votes	%	±%
INC	Dilip Lahariya	95,497	46.79	+18.09
BJP	Krishnamurti Bandhi	75,356	36.92	+0.55
BSP	Dauram Ratnakar	15,583	7.64	−21.18
AAP	Dharamdas Bhargav	3,820	1.87	+1.30
CPI	Laxman Tandan	2,835	1.39	
Hamar Raj Party	Sukhram Khute	2,763	1.35	
JCC	Chandni Bharadwaj	2,475	1.21	
NOTA	None of the Above	2,333	1.14	−0.70
Majority		20,141	9.87	+5.95
Turnout		204,084	66.78	−2.28
INC gain from BJP		Swing		

=== 2018 ===
Chhattisgarh Legislative Assembly Election, 2018: Masturi
Party	Candidate	Votes	%	±%
BJP	Krishnamurti Bandhi	67,950	36.37	
BSP	Jayendra Singh Patle	53,843	28.82	
INC	Dilip Lahariya	53,620	28.70	
Independent	Hira Gandharw	1,725	0.92	
NOTA	None of the Above	3,437	1.84	
Majority		14,107	7.55	
Turnout		186,851	69.06	
BJP gain from INC		Swing		

== See also ==
- Bilaspur district, Chhattisgarh
- List of constituencies of Chhattisgarh Legislative Assembly
