= Jyotsna Mahant =

Member of the Lok Sabha

Member of Parliament, Lok Sabha
- Incumbent
- Assumed office 23 May 2019
- Preceded by: Banshilal Mahto
- Constituency: Korba

Personal details
- Born: 18 November 1953 (age 72)
- Party: Indian National Congress
- Spouse: Charan Das Mahant
- Occupation: Politician

Jyotsna Charandas Mahant (born 18 November 1953) is an Indian politician. She was elected to the Lok Sabha, lower house of the Parliament of India from Korba, Chhattisgarh in the 2019 Indian general election as member of the Indian National Congress.
