= Ram Kumar Yadav (Indian politician) =

Indian politician

Ram Kumar Yadav (born 1979) is an Indian politician from Chhattisgarh. He is an MLA from Chandrapur Assembly constituency in Sakti district. He won the 2023 Chhattisgarh Legislative Assembly election representing the Indian National Congress.

== Early life and education ==
Yadav is from Chandrapur, Sakti district, Chhattisgarh. He is the son of Cholal Yadav. He passed Class 8 at Pre Secondary School, Charoda in 1994 and later discontinued his studies. He used to work as a daily wage labourer. In 2023, he declared assets worth Rs.30,000 in 2018 and Rs.10 lakhs in 2023, in his affidavits to the Election Commission of India.

== Career ==
Yadav was first elected as an MLA winning the 2018 Chhattisgarh Legislative Assembly election on Indian National Congress ticket. He polled 51,717 votes and defeated his nearest opponent Gitanjali Patel of Bahujan Samaj Party (BSP). He retained the seat from Chandrapur Assembly constituency for Congress, in 2023 Chhattisgarh Legislative Assembly election. He polled 85,525 votes and defeated his nearest rival, Bahu Rani Sanyogita Singh Judev of the Bharatiya Janata Party, by a margin of 15,976 votes.
