= Premchand Patel =

Indian politician (born 1973)

Member of Chhattisgarh Legislative Assembly for Katghora
- Incumbent
- Assumed office 3 December 2023
- Preceded by: Purushottam Kanwar, INC

Personal details
- Born: 2 January 1973 (age 53) Reldabri, Korba, Madhya Pradesh, India (now in Chhattisgarh, India)
- Party: Bharatiya Janata Party
- Parent: Dharmu Ram Patel (Father)
- Education: M.Sc (Physics) & M.A. (Political Science) from Guru Ghasidas University
- Profession: Agriculture

Premchand Patel (born 2 January 1973) is an Indian politician from Bharatiya Janata Party. He represents Katghora in Chhattisgarh Legislative Assembly.

== Political career ==
Patel won Katghora seat in 2023 Assembly election by defeating Congress candidate Purushottam Kanwar by margin of 16,900 votes.
