= Madan Lal Shukla =

Indian politician (1928–1984)

Member of Parliament, Lok Sabha
- In office 1977–1979
- Preceded by: Manhar Bhagatram
- Succeeded by: R.G. Tiwari
- Constituency: Janjgir-Champa

Personal details
- Born: 1928 Kamathi, Nagpur District, British India
- Died: 29 December 1984 (aged 56) Bilaspur, India
- Party: Janata Party
- Other political affiliations: Bharatiya Jana Sangh
- Spouse: Suman Shukla
- Children: Three sons

Madan Lal Shukla (1928 – 29 December 1984) was an Indian politician. He was elected to the Lok Sabha, lower house of the Parliament of India as a member of the Janata Party. Shukla died in Bilaspur on 29 December 1984, at the age of 56.
