= Lakhan Lal Sahu =

Indian politician

Member of Parliament, Lok Sabha
- In office 2014–2019
- Preceded by: Dilip Singh Judeo
- Succeeded by: Arun Sao
- Constituency: Bilaspur

Personal details
- Born: 16 June 1971 (age 54) Farhada, Mungeli, Chhattisgarh
- Party: Bharatiya Janata Party
- Spouse: Nirmla Sahu (m. 1989)
- Children: 3 sons
- Parents: Kalyan Prasad Sahu (father); Kanglin Devi Sahu (mother)
- Education: Master of Arts; Bachelor of Laws
- Alma mater: D.P. Vipra College, Bilaspur
- Occupation: Advocate, Agriculturist

Lakhan Lal Sahu (born 16 June 1971) is an Indian politician and was a member of parliament to the 16th Lok Sabha from Bilaspur (Lok Sabha constituency), Chhattisgarh. He won the 2014 Indian general election being a Bharatiya Janata Party candidate.
