= Kamla Devi Patle =

Indian politician (born 1966)

Member of Parliament, Lok Sabha
- In office 2009–2019
- Preceded by: Karuna Shukla
- Succeeded by: Guharam Ajgalle
- Constituency: Janjgir-Champa

Personal details
- Born: 5 May 1966 (age 60) Khoddal, Korba, Chhattisgarh
- Party: Bharatiya Janata Party
- Spouse: Indrabhushan Patle (m. 1982)
- Children: 2 sons, 2 daughters
- Parents: Vedram Kesariya (father); Prakashmati (mother)
- Occupation: Agriculturist

Kamla Devi Patle (born 5 May 1966) is an Indian politician. She was a Member of Parliament, representing the Janjgir (Lok Sabha constituency) in the state of Chhattisgarh. She was elected to the 15th Lok Sabha in 2009 by defeating Dr. Shivkumar Dahariya of Indian National Congress by 87,211 votes and got re-elected to 16th Lok Sabha in 2014.
