= P.R. Khute =

Indian politician

P.R. Khute (born February 15, 1952, in Sonepur, Raipur district) was a member of the 13th Lok Sabha of India. He represented the Sarangarh constituency of Undivided Madhya Pradesh and is a member of the Bharatiya Janata Party political party.
