= Charan Das Mahant =

Indian politician (born 1954)

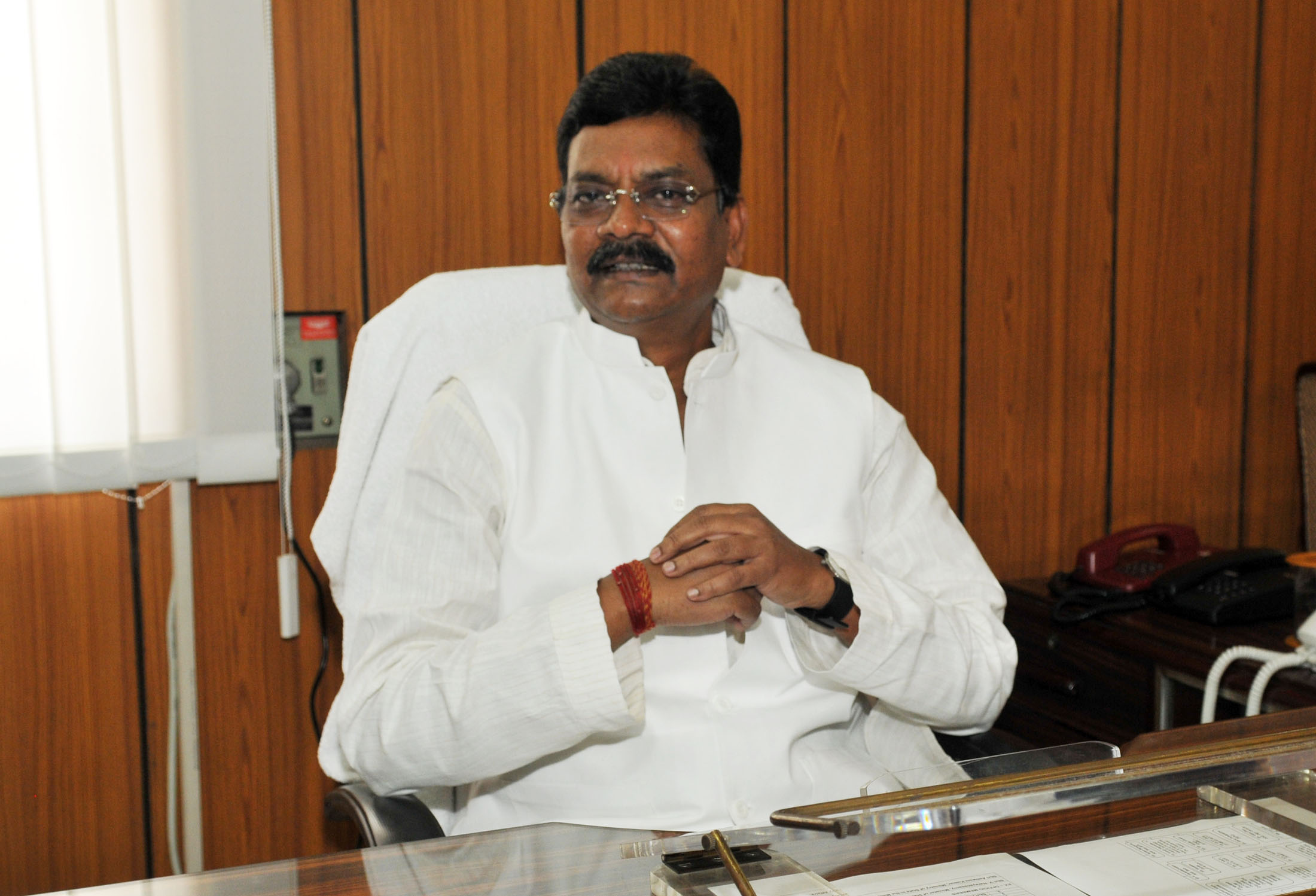

7th Leader of the Opposition, Chhattisgarh Legislative Assembly
- Incumbent
- Assumed office 16 December 2023
- Governor: Ramen Deka
- Deputy: Lakheshwar Baghel
- Preceded by: Narayan Chandel

Speaker of Chhattisgarh Legislative Assembly
- In office 4 January 2019 – 3 December 2023
- Preceded by: Gaurishankar Agrawal
- Succeeded by: Raman Singh
- Constituency: Sakti

Minister of State, Ministry of Food Processing Industries
- In office 12 July 2011 – 26 May 2014
- Prime Minister: Manmohan Singh

Member of Parliament, Lok Sabha
- In office 2009–2014
- Preceded by: Constituency Established
- Succeeded by: Banshilal Mahto
- Constituency: Korba
- In office 1998–2004
- Preceded by: Manharan Lal Pandey
- Succeeded by: Karuna Shukla
- Constituency: Janjgir

Member of Madhya Pradesh Legislative Assembly for Champa
- In office 1980–1990
- Preceded by: Bisahu Das Mahant
- Succeeded by: Balihar Singh
- In office 1993–1998
- Preceded by: Balihar Singh
- Succeeded by: Narayan Chandel

Minister Of State Government of Madhya Pradesh
- In office 1988–1989

Personal details
- Born: 13 December 1954 (age 71) Saragaon, Madhya Pradesh, India (now in Chhattisgarh, India)
- Party: Indian National Congress
- Spouse: Jyotsna Mahant (m. 1980)
- Children: 4
- Parent: Bisahu Das Mahant (father)
- Education: MSc, M.A., LLB, PhD
- Alma mater: GMVM, Bhopal; Barkatullah University
- Occupation: Reader, writer, agriculturist
- Website: charandasmahant.in
- As of 15 October, 2018

Charan Das Mahant (born 13 December 1954) is an Indian politician from Indian National Congress who serves as the 7th Opposition Leader in the Chhattisgarh Legislative Assembly since 2023. He was the member of the Indian Parliament, representing Korba constituency. He is the former Union Minister of State for Agriculture and Food Processing.

Mahant was the only Congress Member of Parliament from Chhattisgarh during the 15th Lok-Sabha term. He first won the Lok Sabha seat in 1998 and then was re-elected in 1999 and 2009. Mahant was also appointed as the Working President of the Chhattisgarh Pradesh Congress Committee. Mahant is also a writer, having authored 3 books of fiction and non-fiction, all of which are centered on India and its history, culture, politics, society, and more. Mahant firmly believes that the real development of India is not possible until we uplift the tribal life. So, he prepares action plan and organizes State-level programs for the uplifting of tribal life; encouraging and creating platforms for folk art such as drama, dance, and songs.

== Early life ==
Mahant was born in Saragaon in the Janjgir–Champa district of Chhattisgarh. His father, Late Shri Bisahu Das Mahant, was a former Congress MLA and state minister from Champa, besides being a well-known social worker. He studied at the Motilal Vigyan Mahavidhyalaya under Bhopal University (Barkatullah University) in Bhopal, in the state of Madhya Pradesh. Charan Das Mahant married Smt. Jyotsna Mahant and they have three daughters and a son. By profession he is an agriculturist, apart from being a politician and social worker. His interests and favourite pastimes include painting, music, sports, reading, participating in debates, travelling and spending time with members of the family.

Mahant has three daughters and one son from his marriage: Surabhi Singh, Supriya Mahant, Bhanupriya Mahant & Suraj Mahant. Surabhi Singh got graduated from IEHE, Bhopal and got married in year 2007 and have a daughter, lives in Bhopal, India. Supriya Mahant is serving the people in the field of Clinical psychology and also continuing Ph.D. at Pt. Ravishankar Shukla University, Raipur, lives in Raipur. Bhanupriya Mahant graduated from People's College of Dental Science & Research Centre (PCDS & RC) lives in Kansas, USA. Suraj Mahant started Master of Public Administration at UMKC and also lives in Kansas, USA.

== Political career ==
- Vidhan Sabha

Mahant's diplomatic career started as Member of Madhya Pradesh Legislative Assembly for two terms, from 1980 to 1990. During which he became chairman of the Committee on Assurances in the year 1981. In 1985 he was member of the Delegated Legislation Committee member and the Secretary of the Madhya Pradesh Congress Committee. During 1988 to 1989 he was the Minister of State, Madhya Pradesh, holding the Department of Agriculture. During 1993 to 1995 he became Minister of State, Madhya Pradesh (Independent Charge), in the Department of Commercial Tax. From 1993 to 1998, he was member of the Legislative Assembly of Madhya Pradesh. From 1995 to 1998, he was the Cabinet Minister, Madhya Pradesh, looking after Home Affairs and Public Relations.

Again in 2018, Mahant contested Chhattisgarh Legislative Assembly election and defeated Medha Ram Sahu of (BJP) by margin of 30,046 votes.

- Lok Sabha

In 1998, Mahant was elected as member of the 12th Lok Sabha. During 1998 to 1999, he held position as member of Environment and Forests Committee, and its Sub-Committee on Food Technology, Committee on Science and Technology. In 1999, he was re-elected for the second term to the 13th Lok Sabha, and also became Consultative Committee Member in the Ministry of Coal. From 2000 to 2004 he was member of Committee on Science and Technology, Environment and Forests Committee, Consultative Committee under the Ministry of Chemicals and Fertilizers, From 2004 to 2005 he was Working President of the Pradesh Congress Committee of Chhattisgarh. From 2005 to 2006 he was Acting President of the Pradesh Congress Committee of Chhattisgarh. From 2006 to 2008 he was President of the Pradesh Congress Committee of Chhattisgarh.

In May 2008, he was again appointed as the Pradesh Congress Committee's working president.

In 2009, he was re-elected for the third term, in the 15th Lok Sabha. On August 6, 2009, he became member of the Committee on Public Undertakings. On August 31 he became member of the Committee on Science and Technology, Environment and Forests. On September 23, 2009, he became the Chairman of the Joint Committee on Salaries and Allowances of Members of Parliament.

Lok Sabha
Preceded by Manharan Lal Pandey	Member of Parliament for Janjgir; 1998 – 2004	Succeeded by Karuna Shukla
Preceded by Constituency did not exist	Member of Parliament for Korba; 2009 – 2014	Succeeded by Banshilal Mahto
