= Bilaspur Lok Sabha constituency =

Lok Sabha Constituency in Chhattisgarh

Coordinates: 22.1°N 82.1°E

Bilaspur CG-5
- Lok Sabha constituency
- Interactive Map Outlining Bilaspur Lok Sabha constituency

Constituency details
- Country: India
- Region: Central India
- State: Chhattisgarh
- Assembly constituencies: Kota; Lormi; Mungeli; Takhatpur; Bilha; Bilaspur; Beltara; Masturi
- Established: 1952
- Reservation: None

Member of Parliament
- 18th Lok Sabha
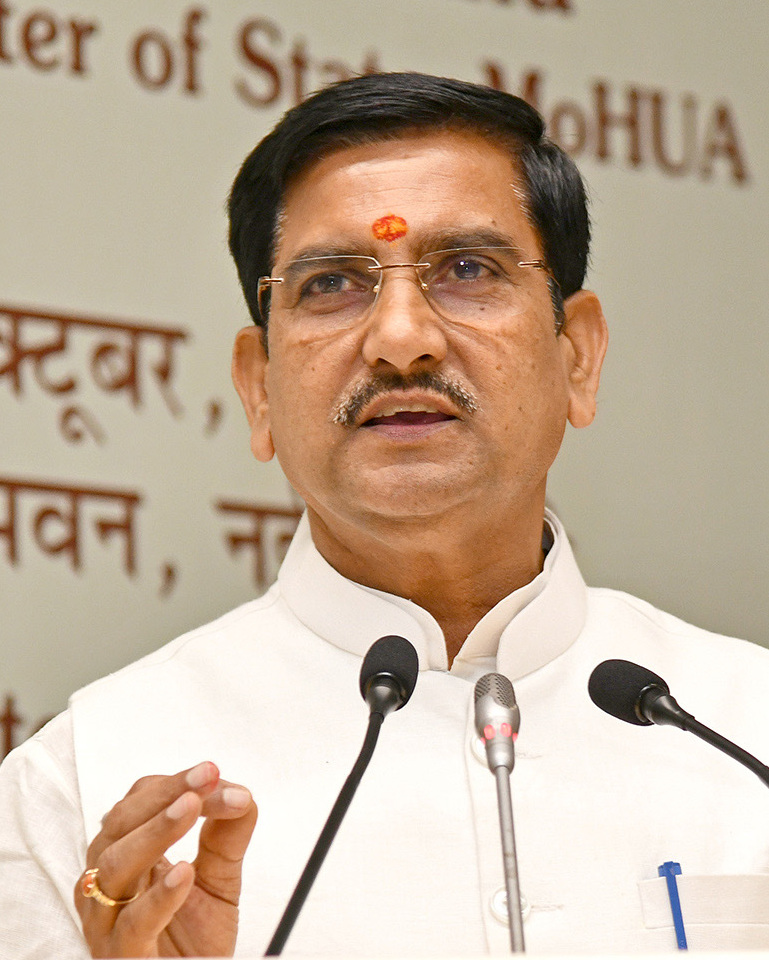
- Incumbent Tokhan Sahu; MoS in Ministry of Housing and Urban Affairs
- Party: BJP
- Alliance: NDA
- Elected year: 2024
- Preceded by: Arun Sao, BJP

Bilaspur is a Lok Sabha parliamentary constituency in Chhattisgarh.

== Bilaspur-Durg-Raipur Lok Sabha constituency ==
During the 1951-52 Lok Sabha elections, Bilaspur, Durg and Raipur formed a joint parliamentary constituency. This arrangement continued until the 1956 delimitation, when the areas were separated into present three distinct constituencies.

The joint constituency elected two Members of Parliament, Bhupendra Nath Mishra & Agam Dass Guru. After Guru Agam Das Guru's death in 1955, his wife Minimata won the subsequent by-election, becoming the third representative from this region.

== Assembly segments ==
Bilaspur Lok Sabha constituency is composed of the following assembly segments:

Name	District	Member	Party	Leading (in 2024)
Kota	Gaurella-Pendra-Marwahi	Atal Shrivastava	INC	BJP
Lormi	Mungeli	Arun Sao	BJP	BJP
Mungeli (SC)	Mungeli	Punnulal Mohle	BJP	BJP
Takhatpur	Bilaspur	Dharamjeet Singh	BJP	BJP
Bilha	Bilaspur	Dharamlal Kaushik	BJP	BJP
Bilaspur	Bilaspur	Amar Agrawal	BJP	BJP
Beltara	Bilaspur	Sushant Shukla	BJP	BJP
Masturi (SC)	Bilaspur	Dilip Lahariya	INC	BJP

== Members of Parliament ==
Year	Winner	Party
1952	Bhupendra Nath Misra (Note: for the joint Lok Sabha constituency of Bilaspur-Durg-Raipur)	Indian National Congress
1952	Agam Dass Guru	Indian National Congress
1955	Minimata Agam Dass Guru (Note: Minimata was elected in by-elections in 1955 after the sudden demise of the sitting MP, her husband Guru Agam Dass.)	Indian National Congress
1957	Reshamlal Jangade	Indian National Congress
1962	Dr Chandrabhan Singh	Indian National Congress
1967	Amar Singh Sahgal	Indian National Congress
1971	Ram Gopal Tiwari	Indian National Congress
1977	Niranjan Prasad Kesharwani	Janata Party
1980	Godil Prasad Anuragi	Indian National Congress
1984	Khelan Ram Jangde	Indian National Congress
1989	Reshamlal Jangade	Bharatiya Janata Party
1991	Khelan Ram Jangde	Indian National Congress
1996	Punnulal Mohle	Bharatiya Janata Party
1998	Punnulal Mohle	Bharatiya Janata Party
1999	Punnulal Mohle	Bharatiya Janata Party
2004	Punnulal Mohle	Bharatiya Janata Party
2009	Dilip Singh Judeo	Bharatiya Janata Party
2014	Lakhan Lal Sahu	Bharatiya Janata Party
2019	Arun Sao	Bharatiya Janata Party
2024	Tokhan Sahu	Bharatiya Janata Party

== Election results ==
=== 2024 ===
2024 Indian general election: Bilaspur
Party	Candidate	Votes	%	±%
BJP	Tokhan Sahu	724,937	53.25	
INC	Devendra Yadav	560,739	41.16	
NOTA	None of the above	2,849	0.21	
Majority		164,198	12.09	
Turnout		1,365,126	64.88	
BJP hold		Swing		

=== 2019 ===
2019 Indian general elections: Bilaspur
Party	Candidate	Votes	%	±%
BJP	Arun Sao	634,559	52.47	
INC	Atal Shrivastav	492,796	40.75	
BSP	Uttam Das Guroo Gosai	21,180	1.75	
IND.	Engineer Indrasen Mogre	11,982	0.99	
NOTA	None of the Above	4,365	0.36	
Majority		141,763	12.72	
Turnout		1,210,261	64.48	
BJP hold		Swing		

=== 2014 ===
2014 Indian general elections: Bilaspur
Party	Candidate	Votes	%	±%
BJP	Lakhan Lal Sahu	561,387	51.48	
INC	Karuna Shukla	384,951	35.30	
BSP	Dharam Bhargav	26,340	2.42	
AAP	Anand Mishra	20,733	1.90	
Majority		176,436	16.18	
Turnout		1,090,583	63.07	
BJP hold		Swing		

=== 2009 ===
2009 Indian general elections: Bilaspur
Party	Candidate	Votes	%	±%
BJP	Dilip Singh Judeo	347,930	45.18	
INC	Dr. Renu Jogi	327,791	42.57	
BSP	Advocate T. R. Nirala	20,108	2.61	
IND.	Daya Das Lahre	13,800	1.79	
Majority		20,139	2.62	
Turnout		770,024	52.28	
BJP hold		Swing		

== See also ==
- Bilaspur, Chhattisgarh
- List of constituencies of the Lok Sabha
