= Korba Lok Sabha constituency =

Lok Sabha Constituency in Chhattisgarh

Coordinates: 22.34°N 82.76°E

Korba
- Lok Sabha constituency

Constituency details
- Country: India
- Region: Central India
- State: Chhattisgarh
- Assembly constituencies: Bharatpur-Sonhat; Manendragarh; Baikunthpur; Rampur; Korba; Katghora; Pali-Tanakhar; Marwahi
- Established: 2008
- Reservation: None

Member of Parliament
- 18th Lok Sabha
- Incumbent Jyotsna Charan Das Mahant
- Party: Indian National Congress
- Elected year: 2024

Korba is one of 11 Lok Sabha parliamentary constituency in Chhattisgarh state in India. It was formed as per the recommendation of the Delimitation Commission.

Most successful parties from Korba lok sabha
1. INC(3 times) (75.0%)
2. BJP(1 times) (25.0%)

== Assembly segments ==
Korba Lok Sabha constituency is composed of the following assembly segments:

#	Name	District	Member	Party	Leading (in 2024)
1	Bharatpur-Sonhat (ST)	Koriya	Renuka Singh	BJP	INC
2	Manendragarh	Koriya	Shyam Bihari Jaiswal	BJP	INC
3	Baikunthpur	Koriya	Bhaiyalal Rajwade	BJP	INC
20	Rampur (ST)	Korba	Phool Singh Rathiya	INC	INC
21	Korba	Korba	Lakhan Lal Dewangan	BJP	BJP
22	Katghora	Korba	Premchand Patel	BJP	INC
23	Pali-Tanakhar (ST)	Korba	Tuleshwar Hira Singh Markam	GGP	INC
24	Marwahi (ST)	Gaurella-Pendra-Marwahi	Pranav Kumar Marpachi	BJP	INC

== Members of Parliament ==
Year	Member	Party
Till 2009 : Constituency did not exist
2009	Charan Das Mahant	Indian National Congress
2014	Banshilal Mahto	Bharatiya Janata Party
2019	Jyotsna Mahant	Indian National Congress
2024	Jyotsna Mahant	Indian National Congress

== Election results ==
=== 2024 ===
2024 Indian general election: Korba
Party	Candidate	Votes	%	±%
INC	Jyotsna Mahant	570,182	46.53	
BJP	Saroj Pandey	5,26,899	43.00	
GGP	Shyam Singh Markam	48,587	3.97	
NOTA	None of the above	6,097	0.50	
Majority		43,283	3.53	
Turnout		12,26,934	75.73	
INC hold		Swing		

=== 2019 ===
2019 Indian general elections: Korba
Party	Candidate	Votes	%	±%
INC	Jyotsna Charan Das Mahant	523,410	46.03	
BJP	Jyoti Nand Dubey	4,97,061	43.72	
GGP	Tuleshwar Hirasingh Markam	37,417	3.29	
NOTA	None of the above	19,305	1.70	
BSP	Parmit Singh	15880	1.40	
Majority		26,349	2.31	
Turnout		11,37,423	75.38	
INC gain from BJP		Swing		

=== 2014 ===
2014 Indian general elections: Korba
Party	Candidate	Votes	%	±%
BJP	Dr. Banshilal Mahto	4,39,002	40.70	
INC	Charan Das Mahant	4,34,737	40.31	
GGP	Hirasingh Markam	52,753	4.89	
IND.	Jeevan Lal Raoutel	18,459	1.71	
AAP	Amar Nath Pandey	14,594	1.35	
Majority		4,265	0.41	
Turnout		10,52,839	73.95	
BJP gain from INC		Swing		

=== 2009 ===
2009 Indian general elections: Korba
Party	Candidate	Votes	%	±%
INC	Charan Das Mahant	3,14,616	42.19	
BJP	Karuna Shukla	2,93,879	39.41	
GGP	Hira Singh Markaam	32,962	4.42	
IND.	Shambhu Prasad Sharma Advocate	23,136	3.10	
Majority		20,737	2.78	
Turnout		7,45,612	58.41	
INC win (new seat)				

== See also ==
- Korba
- List of constituencies of the Lok Sabha
