= Karuna Shukla =

Indian politician (1950–2021)

Smt. Karuna Shukla

Member of Parliament
- In office 2004–2009
- Preceded by: Charan Das Mahant
- Succeeded by: Kamla Patle
- Constituency: Janjgir

Personal details
- Born: 1 August 1950 Gwalior, Madhya Bharat, India
- Died: 27 April 2021 (aged 70) Raipur, Chhattisgarh, India
- Cause of death: COVID-19
- Party: Indian National Congress (since 2014)
- Other political affiliations: Bharatiya Janata Party (1982-2013)
- Spouse: Madhav Shukla
- Relations: Atal Bihari Vajpayee (uncle)
- Children: 1 son and 1 daughter
- As of 25 September, 2006

Karuna Shukla (1 August 1950 – 27 April 2021) was a member of the 14th Lok Sabha of India.

== Biography ==
She represented the Janjgir constituency of Chhattisgarh and was a member of the Bharatiya Janata Party (BJP) political party till 2013. She lost the 2009 elections from Korba to Charan Das Mahant of the Indian National Congress who was minister at union govt.

She resigned from the BJP on 25 October 2013 citing that the party was "allegedly under the grip of power politics".

Karuna was the niece of former Prime Minister Atal Bihari Vajpayee.

After having ended her 32-year-long association with BJP, on 27 February 2014, she joined Indian National Congress and contested 2014 Loksabha election from Bilaspur constituency in Chhattisgarh. She was defeated by BJP's Lakhan Lal Sahu by a margin of 176,436 votes.

She contested 2018 Chhattisgarh Vidhan sabha election from Rajnandgaon, but lost. She was defeated by former Chief minister Sri Raman Singh.

On April 27, 2021, she died from COVID-19.
