= Janjgir–Champa Lok Sabha constituency =

Lok Sabha Constituency in Chhattisgarh

Coordinates: 22.0°N 82.6°E

Janjgir-Champa CG-3
- Lok Sabha constituency
- Interactive Map Outlining Janjgir Lok Sabha constituency

Constituency details
- Country: India
- Region: Central India
- State: Chhattisgarh
- Assembly constituencies: Akaltara; Janjgir-Champa; Sakti; Chandrapur; Jaijaipur; Pamgarh; Bilaigarh; Kasdol
- Established: 1952
- Reservation: SC

Member of Parliament
- 18th Lok Sabha
- Incumbent Kamlesh Jangde
- Party: Bharatiya Janata Party
- Elected year: 2024

Janjgir-Champa is a Lok Sabha parliamentary constituency in Chhattisgarh, India.

== Assembly segments ==
Janjgir-Champa Lok Sabha constituency is reserved for Scheduled Castes (SC) candidates. It is composed of the following assembly segments:

| # | Name | District | Member | Party | Leading (in 2024) |
|---|---|---|---|---|---|
| 33 | Akaltara | Janjgir-Champa | Raghvendra Singh | INC | BJP |
| 34 | Janjgir-Champa | Janjgir-Champa | Vyas Kashyap | INC | BJP |
| 35 | Sakti | Janjgir-Champa | Charan Das Mahant | INC | BJP |
| 36 | Chandrapur | Janjgir-Champa | Ram Kumar Yadav | INC | BJP |
| 37 | Jaijaipur | Janjgir-Champa | Baleshwar Sahu | INC | INC |
| 38 | Pamgarh (SC) | Janjgir-Champa | Sheshraj Harbans | INC | INC |
| 43 | Bilaigarh (SC) | Baloda Bazar | Kavita Pran Lahrey | INC | INC |
| 44 | Kasdol | Baloda Bazar | Sandeep Sahu | INC | BJP |

== Members of Parliament ==
| Year | Member | Party |
|---|---|---|
| 1957 | Amar Singh Sahgal | Indian National Congress |
| 1957 | Minimata Agam Dass Guru | Indian National Congress |
| 1962 | Amar Singh Sahgal | Indian National Congress |
| 1962 | Minimata Agam Dass Guru | Indian National Congress |
| 1967 | Minimata Agam Dass Guru | Indian National Congress |
| 1971 | Minimata Agam Dass Guru | Indian National Congress |
| 1974^ | Manhar Bhagatram | Indian National Congress |
| 1977 | Madan Lal Shukla | Janata Party |
| 1980 | Ram Gopal Tiwari | Indian National Congress |
| 1984 | Prabhat Kumar Mishra | Indian National Congress |
| 1989 | Dilip Singh Judeo | Bharatiya Janata Party |
| 1991 | Bhawani Lal Verma | Indian National Congress |
| 1996 | Manharan Lal Pandey | Bharatiya Janata Party |
| 1998 | Charan Das Mahant | Indian National Congress |
| 1999 | Charan Das Mahant | Indian National Congress |
| 2004 | Karuna Shukla | Bharatiya Janata Party |
| 2009 | Kamla Devi Patle | Bharatiya Janata Party |
| 2014 | Kamla Devi Patle | Bharatiya Janata Party |
| 2019 | Guharam Ajgalle | Bharatiya Janata Party |
| 2024 | Kamlesh Jangre | Bharatiya Janata Party |

^ by poll

== Election results ==
=== 2024 ===
2024 Indian general election: Janjgir-Champa
| Party | Candidate | Votes | % | ±% |
|---|---|---|---|---|
| BJP | Kamlesh Jangde | 678,199 | 48.71 | |
| INC | Dr. Shivkumar Dahariya | 6,18,199 | 44.40 | |
| NOTA | None of the above | 5,098 | 0.37 | |
| Majority | | 60,000 | 4.31 | |
| Turnout | | 13,94,953 | 67.77 | ▲1.75 |
| BJP hold | | Swing | | |

=== 2019 ===
2019 Indian general elections: Janjgir-Champa
| Party | Candidate | Votes | % | ±% |
|---|---|---|---|---|
| BJP | Guharam Ajgalle | 572,790 | 45.91 | |
| INC | Ravi Parasaram Bhardwaj | 4,89,535 | 39.24 | |
| BSP | Dauram Ratnakar | 1,31,387 | 10.53 | |
| NOTA | None of the Above | 9,981 | 0.8 | |
| Majority | | 83,255 | 6.67 | |
| Turnout | | 12,48,474 | 65.81 | |
| BJP hold | | Swing | | |

=== 2014 ===
2014 Indian general elections: Janjgir-Champa
| Party | Candidate | Votes | % | ±% |
|---|---|---|---|---|
| BJP | Kamla Patle | 518,909 | 48.34 | |
| INC | Prem Chand Jayasi | 3,43,948 | 32.04 | |
| BSP | Duj Ram Bouddh | 1,25,617 | 11.70 | |
| NOTA | None of the Above | 18,438 | 1.72 | |
| Majority | | 1,74,961 | 16.30 | |
| Turnout | | 10,73,367 | 61.54 | |
| BJP hold | | Swing | | |

=== 2009 ===
2009 Indian general elections: Janjgir-Champa
| Party | Candidate | Votes | % | ±% |
|---|---|---|---|---|
| BJP | Shrimati Kamla Devi Patle | 302,142 | 40.96 | |
| INC | Dr. Shivkumar Dahariya | 2,14,931 | 29.14 | |
| BSP | Dauram Ratnakar | 1,75,979 | 23.86 | |
| IND. | Ramcharan Pradhan Adhiwakta | 15,345 | 2.08 | |
| Majority | | 87,211 | 11.82 | |
| Turnout | | 7,37,578 | 48.57 | |
| BJP hold | | Swing | | |

== See also ==
- Janjgir–Champa district
- List of constituencies of the Lok Sabha
