= Dilip Singh Judeo =

Indian politician

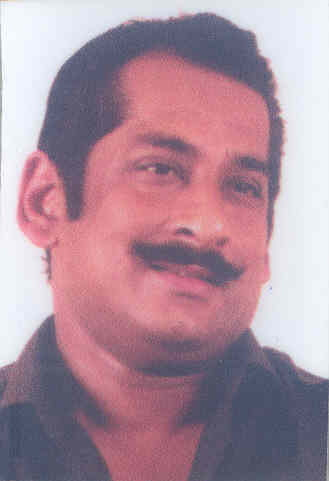

Union Minister of State of Environment and Forests
- In office 29 January 2003 – 17 November 2003
- Prime Minister: Atal Bihari Vajpayee

Member of Parliament, Lok Sabha
- In office 22 May 2009 – 14 August 2013
- Preceded by: Punnulal Mohle
- Succeeded by: Lakhan Lal Sahu
- Constituency: Bilaspur
- In office 1989–1991
- Preceded by: Prabhat Kumar Mishra
- Succeeded by: Bhawani Lal Verma
- Constituency: Janjgir

Member of Parliament, Rajya Sabha
- In office 1 November 2000 – 22 May 2009
- Succeeded by: Nand Kumar Sai
- Constituency: Chhattisgarh
- In office 30 June 1992 – 31 October 2000
- Constituency: Madhya Pradesh

Personal details
- Born: 8 March 1949 Jashpur, Central Provinces and Berar, India (now in Chhattisgarh, India)
- Died: 14 August 2013 (aged 64) Gurgaon, Haryana, India
- Party: Bharatiya Janata Party
- Spouse: Madhvi Devi
- Children: 3, including Yudhvir Singh Judev
- Education: Rajkumar College, Raipur; St. Xavier's College, Ranchi; Chotanagpur Law College

Dilip Singh Judeo (8 March 1949 – 14 August 2013) was an Indian politician and former Minister of State for Environment and Forests in Prime Minister Atal Bihari Vajpayee's Bharatiya Janata Party-led National Democratic Alliance government.

He remains a popular political leader among Sangh Parivar.

== Early life ==
He hailed from Jashpur royal family and was younger son of son of Raja Vijay Bhushan Singh Deo, the last ruling prince of Jashpur State.

== Career ==
Judeo started Ghar Wapsi campaign in Chhattisgarh.

In November 2003 he was accused of accepting a bribe for mining rights in Chhattisgarh. The accusation was made by The Sunday Express newspaper, which had received a video of the bribe taking place. Judeo resigned from his ministerial position on 17 November 2003.

He was Member of Parliament from Bilaspur, Chhattisgarh.

== Death ==
On 15 August 2013, he died because of kidney and lung infection. He outlived his eldest son Shatrunjay Pratap Singh Judev, who died of a heart attack. He was followed in death by his youngest son Yudhvir Singh Judev, who died of a liver ailment in 2021. His middle son, Prabal Pratap Singh Judev is the only surviving son.

== Legacy ==
Judeo remains an important figure for the Sangh Parivar. In 2022, RSS chief Mohan Bhagwat unveiled his statue in Jashpur, Chattisgarh.
