= Raman Singh =

Indian politician (born 1952)

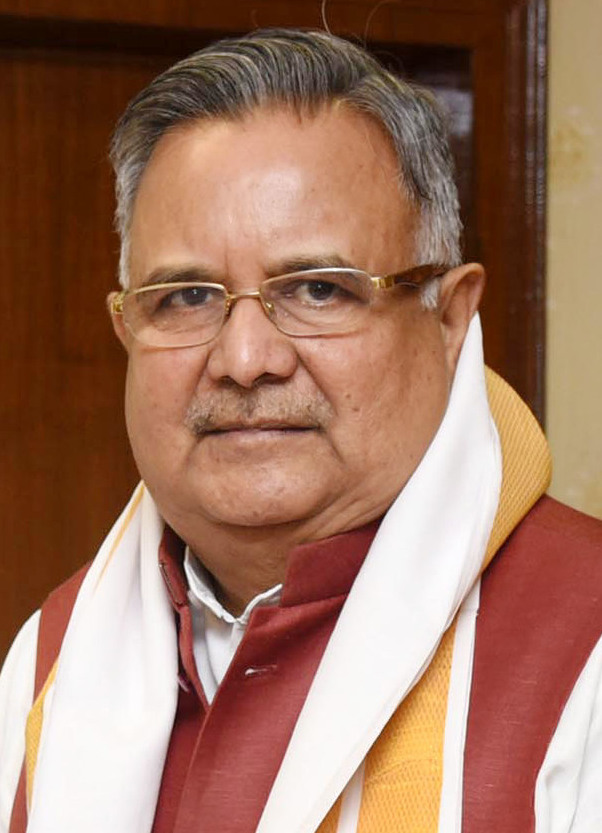
- Singh in 2019

6th Speaker of the Chhattisgarh Legislative Assembly
- Incumbent
- Assumed office 19 December 2023
- Chief Minister: Vishnudeo Sai
- Preceded by: Charan Das Mahant; Ramvichar Netam pro tem

Member of the Chhattisgarh Legislative Assembly
- Incumbent
- Assumed office 7 December 2008
- Preceded by: Uday Mudliyar
- Constituency: Rajnandgaon
- In office January 2004 – 7 December 2008
- Preceded by: Pradeep Gandhi
- Succeeded by: Kheduram Sahu
- Constituency: Dongargaon

2nd Chief Minister of Chhattisgarh
- In office 7 December 2003 – 17 December 2018
- Governor: List: K. M. Seth; Sushil Kumar Shinde; K. M. Seth; E. S. L. Narasimhan; Shekhar Dutt; Ram Naresh Yadav; Balram Das Tandon; Anandiben Patel
- Preceded by: Ajit Jogi
- Succeeded by: Bhupesh Baghel

Minister of State for Commerce and Industry
- In office 13 October 1999 – 29 January 2003
- Prime Minister: Atal Bihari Vajpayee
- Minister: Murasoli Maran; Arun Shourie

Member of Parliament, Lok Sabha
- In office 1999–2003
- Preceded by: Motilal Vora
- Succeeded by: Pradeep Gandhi
- Constituency: Rajnandgaon

Member of the Madhya Pradesh Legislative Assembly
- In office 1990–1998
- Preceded by: Rani Shashi Prabha Devi
- Succeeded by: Yogeshwar Raj Singh
- Constituency: Kawardha

Personal details
- Born: 15 October 1952 (age 74) Kawardha, Chhattisgarh, India
- Party: Bharatiya Janata Party
- Spouse: Veena Singh
- Children: 2; including Abhishek Singh
- Education: Government Ayurvedic College, Raipur BAMS
- Occupation: politician

Raman Singh (born 15 October 1952) is an Indian politician from the Bharatiya Janata Party (BJP) who has served as the Chief Minister of Chhattisgarh for three consecutive times from 2003 to 2018. Currently, he serving as the sixth speaker of the Chhattisgarh Legislative Assembly. He is also a member of the Chhattisgarh Legislative Assembly representing Rajnandgaon since 2008 and from Dongargaon from 2004 to 2008.

He is the longest serving Chief Minister of Chhattisgarh, and held the position for 15 years from 2003 to 2018. Previously he also served as the Minister of State for Commerce and Industries in the Vajpayee cabinet from 1999 to 2003, Member of the Lok Sabha from Rajnandgaon from 1999 to 2003. Before the state of Chhattisgarh was carved out of Madhya Pradesh, he was a member of the Madhya Pradesh Legislative Assembly from Kawardha from 1990 to 1998.

He was also formerly National Vice President of the BJP, serving from 2019 to 2023.

== Early life and education ==
Raman Singh was born in Kawardha, in a Hindu Rajput family, to Vighnaharan Singh Thakur, an advocate, and Sudha Singh. After completion of schooling, he graduated from Government Science College, Bemetara in 1972. In the year 1975 he also studied Ayurvedic Medicine at Government Ayurvedic College, Raipur.

== Political career ==
Singh joined the Bharatiya Janata Party as a youth member and was the president of youth wing in Kawardha in 1976-77. He progressed to become a councillor of Kawardha municipality in 1983.

He was elected to Madhya Pradesh Legislative Assembly consecutively in 1990 and 1993 from Kawardha (Vidhan Sabha constituency). In 1998 general election he lost the kawardha seat . After that in 1999 he was elected to the 13th Lok Sabha from the Rajnandgaon constituency in Chhattisgarh. In the government of Atal Bihari Vajpayee, Singh became the Union Minister of State for Commerce and Industry from 1999 to 2003. He was later named as President of the Bharatiya Janata Party (BJP) in the new state of Chhattisgarh, and led the party to a victory in the 2003 state Assembly elections. With the other main contender for the Chief Minister's post, Dilip Singh Judeo, caught in the midst of a scam, the BJP leadership named Raman Singh as Chhattisgarh's second Chief Minister, and the first person to be elected to that post. He entered Vidhan Sabha by contesting bypoll in 2004 from Dongargaon. He has won 3 successive Vidhan Sabha elections - in 2008, 2013, and 2018 - from Rajnandgaon seat.

He has received praise for his organisational abilities, as reflected in his state's position with regard to implementation of a programme to improve the conditions of Scheduled Tribes and Scheduled Castes. The United Nations has also recognised the work done in Chhattisgarh under his leadership and the fiscal management of the state is another aspect for which he is known.

He banned Naxalite organisations in Chhattisgarh in 2002 under the "Salwa Judum" initiative, a move supported by the opposition party as well, led by Mahendra Karma who was assassinated by Naxalites on 25 May 2013. Singh was sworn in for his second term on 12 December 2008. On 8 December 2013 he was re-elected as the chief minister (CM) of the state. In August 2017, Chief Minister Raman Singh completed 5000 days as the Chief Minister of the state. By introducing the Public Distribution System (PDS) and other schemes, Singh earned nationwide popularity. As a move to encourage the start-up culture and offering several incentives for start-up entrepreneur he started the "Startup Chhattisgarh" scheme. His other initiatives include promotion of digital technology, interest free agricultural loans in addition to banning the naxal groups, which made him popular in Chhattisgarh. Singh's government had received attention for number of welfare measures like Medical care, food security, the Charan Paduka Yojana that entitles people to free shoes, the Saraswati Cycle Yojana that promises a free bicycle to school-going girls, and Mukhya Mantri Teerth Yatra Yojana that allows the elderly to go on their desired pilgrimage, it had introduced in the course of the 15 odd years it had been in power, despite poverty and agrarian distress for 18 years.

BJP won the election in 2013 for his third tenure as a CM of Chhattisgarh. After the loss of his party in the 2018 assembly elections, he resigned as the CM of Chhattisgarh on 11 December 2018.

He has been serving as the Speaker of the Chhattisgarh Legislative Assembly since December 2023.

== Chief Minister of Chhattisgarh (2003-2018) ==
Singh assumed the office of Chief Minister of Chhattisgarh on 7 December 2003, following the victory of the Bharatiya Janata Party in the first state assembly elections. During his first term, he focused on building the administrative infrastructure of the newly formed state. He gained national prominence for his overhaul of the Public Distribution System (PDS), which earned him the nickname "Chawal Wale Baba" due to the effective distribution of highly subsidized rice to the poor. Under his leadership, Chhattisgarh became the first state in India to enact its own Food Security Act in 2012.

Singh led the BJP to a second consecutive victory in 2008 and was sworn in for his second term on 12 December 2008. His administration prioritized industrialization and mineral exploitation, leveraging the state's vast coal and iron ore reserves to turn the region into a power and steel hub. He was elected for a third consecutive term in 2013. This period saw the development of Nava Raipur, India's first planned greenfield smart city, as the state's new administrative capital.

=== Education and School Initiatives ===
The Raman Singh administration focused heavily on improving infrastructure for government school children, particularly in tribal regions. The government launched the "Prayas" initiative under the Chief Minister’s Mukhymantri Bal Bhavishya Suraksha Yojana to provide specialized coaching to students from Naxal-affected districts, helping them secure admissions in premier institutes like IITs and NITs. Additionally, the state government focused on reducing the dropout rate by providing free bicycles to girl students under the "Saraswati Cycle Yojana," which significantly improved female enrollment in rural schools. The establishment of "Education City" in Dantewada became a globally recognized model for providing modern educational facilities in conflict zones.

=== Sanchar Kranti Yojana (SKY) ===
To bridge the digital divide, the Singh government launched the "Sanchar Kranti Yojana" (SKY) in 2017–18. The primary objective was to distribute free smartphones to over 4.5 million citizens, including women heads of rural households and college students. The scheme was aimed at enhancing the reach of e-governance and improving digital literacy across the state's remote areas. The project also included the installation of over 1,500 new mobile towers to ensure connectivity in "dark zones" where network coverage was previously unavailable.

Despite economic progress, his tenure faced significant challenges due to the Naxalite–Maoist insurgency. His government initiated various counter-insurgency measures, including the controversial Salwa Judum and later shifting focus towards development-led security in Naxal-hit districts like Dantewada. After serving for 15 years, Singh resigned on 11 December 2018 following the BJP's defeat in the 2018 Legislative Assembly elections. During his three terms, the state recorded significant fiscal growth and improvements in rural infrastructure.

== Public image ==
Raman Singh is widely known in Chhattisgarh as "Chaunr Wale Baba" (translated as "Baba with Rice") due to his successful implementation of the Public Distribution System (PDS) and the 2012 Food Security Act, which significantly reduced hunger in the state. His public persona is often described as that of an educated, soft-spoken, and approachable leader, which helped him maintain a consistent popularity across three terms.

Beyond his welfare schemes, he is credited with transforming Chhattisgarh from a newly formed backward state into an industrial hub, particularly in the power and steel sectors. His image among the rural and tribal populace was further bolstered by pro-farmer policies and the distribution of free bicycles to girl students under the Saraswati Cycle Yojana.

On the security front, while his tenure saw a significant crackdown on Naxalism through both security operations and development-led initiatives, his image also faced scrutiny regarding human rights issues in conflict zones. Despite this, he remains a key figure in the state's political history for overseeing its most rapid phase of urban and digital growth through projects like Naya Raipur and the Sanchar Kranti Yojana.

== Awards and recognition ==
- Outstanding Parliamentarian Award (2004–05): Singh was recognized for his contribution to parliamentary proceedings during his tenure.
- CSO Partners Outstanding Contribution Award (2009): He received this award for the successful implementation of the Public Distribution System (PDS) in Chhattisgarh.
- Indian Express IT Award (2012): His government was awarded for excellence in IT for the "CORE PDS" (Centralized Online Real-time Electronic PDS) project.
- E-Governance Awards: Under his leadership, Chhattisgarh won several National Awards for E-Governance, including recognition for the "CHIPS" (Chhattisgarh Infotech Promotion Society) initiatives.
- Agriculture Leadership Award (2015): He was honored for the state's performance in agricultural growth and the implementation of pro-farmer schemes.

== Electoral history ==
Election results
Year	Office	Constituency	Party	Votes for Singh	%	Opponent	Party	Votes	%	Margin	Result	Ref.
1990	Member of the Legislative Assembly	Kawardha	Bharatiya Janata Party	—	—	—	Indian National Congress	—	—	—	Won	
1993	Member of the Legislative Assembly	Kawardha	Bharatiya Janata Party	—	—	—	Indian National Congress	—	—	—	Won	
1998	Member of the Legislative Assembly	Kawardha	Bharatiya Janata Party	37,524	41.45	Yogeshwar Raj Singh	Indian National Congress	52,950	58.49	15,426	Lost	
1999	Member of Parliament, Lok Sabha	Rajnandgaon	Bharatiya Janata Party	3,04,611	50.46	Motilal Vora	Indian National Congress	2,77,896	46.04	26,715	Won	
2004^	Member of the Legislative Assembly	Dongargaon	Bharatiya Janata Party	42,115	—	Geeta Devi Singh	Indian National Congress	32,004	—	10,111	Won	
2008	Member of the Legislative Assembly	Rajnandgaon	Bharatiya Janata Party	77,230	54.49	Uday Mudliyar	Indian National Congress	44,841	31.64	32,389	Won	
2013	Member of the Legislative Assembly	Rajnandgaon	Bharatiya Janata Party	86,797	56.63	Alka Mudliyar	Indian National Congress	50,931	33.23	35,866	Won	
2018	Member of the Legislative Assembly	Rajnandgaon	Bharatiya Janata Party	80,589	51.69	Karuna Shukla	Indian National Congress	63,656	40.83	16,933	Won	
2023	Member of the Legislative Assembly	Rajnandgaon	Bharatiya Janata Party	1,02,499	61.21	Girish Dewangan	Indian National Congress	57,415	34.29	45,084	Won	

^ = 2004 by-poll (Dongargaon)

== Positions held ==
- 1990 : MLA in Madhya Pradesh Vidhan Sabha, from Kawardha seat
- 1993 : MLA in Madhya Pradesh Vidhan Sabha, from Kawardha seat
- 1998 : Lost Vidhan Sabha election from Kawardha (Vidhan Sabha constituency)
- 1999 : Won Lok Sabha Election, from Rajnandgaon (Lok Sabha constituency)
- 2003 : Became Chief Minister of Chhattisgarh, 2003-2018.
- 2004 : MLA in Chhattisgarh Vidhan Sabha, from Dongargaon seat, via a by-poll
- 2008 : MLA in Chhattisgarh Vidhan Sabha, from Rajnandgaon and 2nd term Chief Minister in Chhattisgarh
- 2013 : MLA in Chhattisgarh Vidhan Sabha, from Rajnandgaon and 3rd term Chief Minister in Chhattisgarh
- 2018 : MLA in Chhattisgarh Vidhan Sabha, from Rajnandgaon.
- 2018 - 18 December 2023: National Vice President of Bhartiya Janta Party.
- 2023 : MLA in Chhattisgarh Vidhan Sabha, from Rajnandgaon.
- 2023 : Speaker of Chhattisgarh Vidhan Sabha

Lok Sabha
Preceded by Motilal Vora	Member of Parliament for Rajnandgaon; 1999 – 2003	Succeeded by Pradeep Gandhi
Political offices
Preceded by Ajit Jogi	Chief Minister of Chhattisgarh; 7 December 2003 – 16 December 2018	Succeeded by Bhupesh Baghel
