= Baghel ministry =

Government of Chhattisgarh, India (2018–2023)

- 5th Ministry of Chhattisgarh
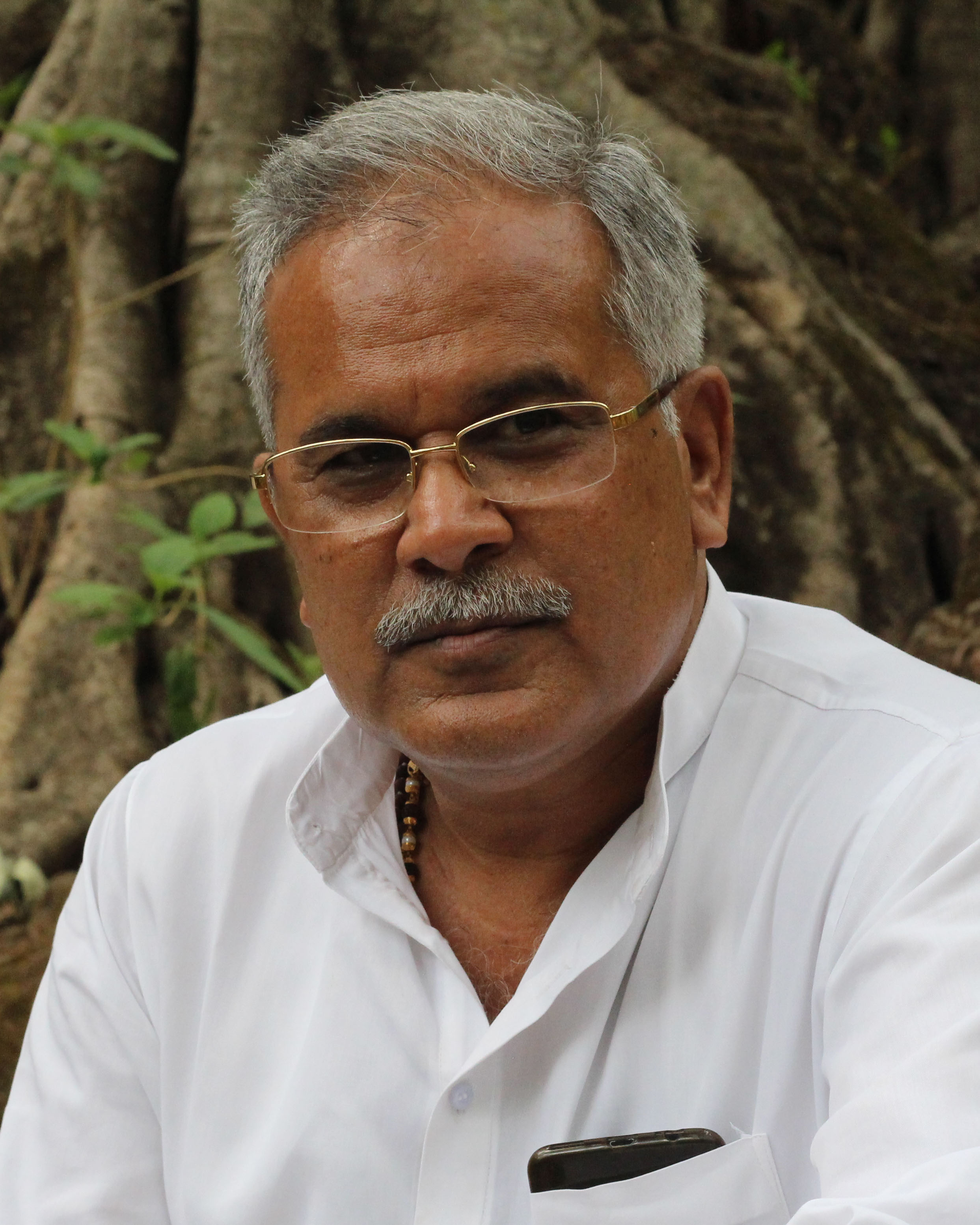
- Bhupesh Baghel; Hon'ble Chief Minister of Chhattisgarh
- Date formed: 17 December 2018
- Date dissolved: 12 December 2023

People and organisations
- Head of state: Governor: Anusuiya Uikey (August 2019 - February 2023)
- Head of government: Bhupesh Baghel
- No. of ministers: 13
- Member parties: Indian National Congress
- Status in legislature: Majority
- Opposition party: Bharatiya Janata Party
- Opposition leader: Dharamlal Kaushik (till 2022)

History
- Election: 2018
- Legislature terms: (4 years, 361 days)
- Predecessor: Raman Singh Third ministry
- Successor: Sai ministry

The Bhupesh Baghel ministry was the Council of Ministers in 5th Chhattisgarh Legislative Assembly headed by Chief Minister Bhupesh Baghel. The ministry had 13 ministers including the Chief Minister.

== Council of Ministers ==
S.No	Name	Constituency	Department	Party
1.	Bhupesh Baghel; Chief Minister	Patan	Finance.; Mining.; General Administration.; Public Relations.; Electronics and Information technology.; Other departments not allocated to any Minister.	INC
Deputy Chief Minister (from 28 June)
2.	T. S. Singh Deo (Only as Cabinet minister Until 28 June)	Ambikapur	Health and Family Welfare.; Medical Education.; 20 Point Program Implementation.; Commercial taxes (GST).; Energy.	INC
Cabinet Ministers
3.	Tamradhwaj Sahu	Durg Gramin	Home.; Public Works Department.; Jail.; Tourism.; Dharmik Nyas And Dharmasv (religious).	INC
4.	Ravindra Choubey	Saja	Legislative Affairs.; Law and Legal Affairs.; Agriculture and Bio-Technology.; Panchayat and Rural Development.; Animal husbandry.; Fisheries.; Water Resources.	INC
5.	Prem Sai Singh Tekam	Pratappur	School Education.; Scheduled caste & Scheduled tribe.; Other backward classes.; Minorities Welfare.; Cooperative.	INC
6.	Mohammad Akbar	Kawardha	Transport.; Forest.; Housing.; Environment.; Law.	INC
7.	Kawasi Lakhma	Konta	Commercial Tax (excise).; Commerce and Industry.	INC
8.	Shivkumar Dahariya	Arang	Labour Welfare; Urban Administration and Development	INC
9.	Anila Bhediya	Daundi Lohara	Women & Child Development.; Social Welfare.	INC
10.	Jai Singh Agrawal	Korba	Revenue.; Disaster management.; Rehabilitation.; Registrar and Stamp	INC
11.	Guru Rudra Kumar	Ahiwara	Public Health & Engineering.; Village Industries.	INC
12.	Umesh Patel	Kharsia	Higher Education.; Technical Education.; Employment.; Skill Development.; Science & technology.; Manpower Planning.; Sports and Youth welfare.	INC
13.	Amarjeet Bhagat	Sitapur	Planning.; Economics & Statistics.; Food & Civil supplies.; Consumer protection.; Culture.	INC
