= Durg Lok Sabha constituency =

Lok Sabha constituency in Chhattisgarh

Coordinates: 21.2°N 81.3°E

Durg CG-7
- Lok Sabha constituency

Constituency details
- Country: India
- Region: Central India
- State: Chhattisgarh
- Assembly constituencies: Patan; Durg Rural; Durg City; Bhilai Nagar; Vaishali Nagar; Ahiwara; Saja; Bemetara; Navagarh
- Established: 1952
- Reservation: None

Member of Parliament
- 18th Lok Sabha
- Incumbent Vijay Baghel
- Party: Bharatiya Janata Party
- Elected year: 2024

Durg Lok Sabha constituency is one of the 11 Lok Sabha constituencies in Chhattisgarh state in central India.

== Assembly segments ==
While most Lok Sabha seats in MP and Chhattisgarh have 8 assembly seats as their segments, Durg and Raipur seats in Chhattisgarh have nine assembly segments under them, and Chhindwara and Satna Lok Sabha seats in MP have only 7 segments under them.

Durg Lok Sabha constituency is composed of the following nine assembly segments:

#	Name	District	Member	Party	Leading (in 2024)
62	Patan	Durg	Bhupesh Baghel	INC	BJP
63	Durg Rural	Durg	Lalit Chandrakar	BJP	BJP
64	Durg City	Durg	Gajendra Yadav	BJP	BJP
65	Bhilai Nagar	Durg	Devender Singh Yadav	INC	BJP
66	Vaishali Nagar	Durg	Rikesh Sen	BJP	BJP
67	Ahiwara (SC)	Durg	Domanlal Korsewada	BJP	BJP
68	Saja	Bemetara	Ishwar Sahu	BJP	BJP
69	Bemetara	Bemetara	Dipesh Sahu	BJP	BJP
70	Navagarh (SC)	Bemetara	Dayaldas Baghel	BJP	BJP

== Members of Parliament ==
Year	Winner	Party
1952	Wasudeo S Kirolikar	Indian National Congress
1952	Guru Gosain Agam Dasji	Indian National Congress
1952	Bhagwati Charan Shukla	Indian National Congress
1957	Mohan Lal Baklial	Indian National Congress
1962	Mohan Lal Baklial	Indian National Congress
1967	Vishwanath Tamaskar	Indian National Congress
1970^	Chandulal Chandrakar	Indian National Congress
1971	Chandulal Chandrakar	Indian National Congress
1977	Mohan Jain	Janata Party
1980	Chandulal Chandrakar	Indian National Congress
1984	Chandulal Chandrakar	Indian National Congress
1989	Purushottam Kaushik	Janata Dal
1991	Chandulal Chandrakar	Indian National Congress
1996	Tarachand Sahu	Bharatiya Janata Party
1998	Tarachand Sahu	Bharatiya Janata Party
1999	Tarachand Sahu	Bharatiya Janata Party
2004	Tarachand Sahu	Bharatiya Janata Party
2009	Saroj Pandey	Bharatiya Janata Party
2014	Tamradhwaj Sahu	Indian National Congress
2019	Vijay Baghel	Bharatiya Janata Party
2024	Vijay Baghel	Bharatiya Janata Party

^ by poll

== Election results ==
=== 2024 ===
2024 Indian general election: Durg
Party	Candidate	Votes	%	±%
BJP	Vijay Baghel	956,497	62.00	▲0.98
INC	Rajendra Sahu	5,18,271	33.59	▲0.73
NOTA	None of the Above	5,617	0.36	N/A
Majority		4,38,226	28.41	▲0.25
Turnout		15,43,861	73.78	
BJP hold		Swing		

=== 2019 ===
2019 Indian general elections: Durg
Party	Candidate	Votes	%	±%
BJP	Vijay Baghel	849,374	61.02	+17.01
INC	Pratima Chandrakar	4,57,396	32.86	−12.49
BSP	Geetanjali Singh	20,124	1.45	
SRDP	Hidar Bhati	12,107	0.87	
Majority		3,91,978	28.16	
Turnout		13,92,719	71.78	
BJP gain from INC		Swing		

=== 2014 ===
2014 Indian general elections: Durg
Party	Candidate	Votes	%	±%
INC	Tamradhwaj Sahu	570,687	45.35	
BJP	Saroj Pandey	5,53,839	44.01	
AAP	Vishwa Ratna Sinha	17,455	1.39	
Independent	Arun Joshi	16,529	1.31	
BSP	Munna Chandrakar	15,600	1.24	
Majority		16,848	1.34	
Turnout		12,59,142	67.74	
INC gain from BJP		Swing		

=== 2009 ===
2009 Indian general elections: Durg
Party	Candidate	Votes	%	±%
BJP	Saroj Pandey	2,83,170	31.27	
INC	Pradeep Choubey	2,73,216	30.17	
Independent	Tarachand Sahu	2,61,879	28.92	
Independent	Shitkaran Mhilwar	17,928	2.01	
BSP	Raghunandan Sahu	17,760	1.96	
Independent	Anand Gautam	14,968	1.65	
Majority		9,954	1.10	
Turnout		9,06,337	55.93	
BJP hold		Swing		

=== 2004 ===
2004 Indian general elections: Durg
Party	Candidate	Votes	%	±%
BJP	Tarachand Sahu	3,82,757	50.24	
INC	Bhupesh Baghel	3,21,289	42.17	
BSP	Shri Mataji	17,935	2.35	
Independent	Manharan Singh Chhedaiha	17,928	2.35	
Independent	Bharat Bhushan Pandey	8,078	1.06	
Independent	Balvinder Singh	3,462	0.45	
Independent	R.D. Jogansh	2,209	0.29	
IJP	Kitan Noni Urf Kiran Beti	2,185	0.29	
SP	Sheikh Rasool	2,155	0.28	
Independent	Ashok Kumar Rajput	1,988	0.26	
Independent	Arun Joshi	1,829	0.24	
Majority		61,468		
Turnout		7,61,815	52.08	
BJP hold		Swing		

== See also ==
- Durg district
- List of constituencies of the Lok Sabha
