= Vishwanath Tamasker =

Indian politician

Lok Sabha
- In office 1967–1970
- Preceded by: Mohan Lal Baklial
- Succeeded by: Chandulal Chandrakar
- Constituency: Durg

Leader of the Opposition, Madhya Pradesh Legislative Assembly
- In office 17 December 1956 – 5 March 1957
- Preceded by: Office established
- Succeeded by: Chandra Pratap Tiwari

Member of Madhya Pradesh Legislative Assembly
- In office 1957–1962
- Preceded by: G. S. Gupta
- Succeeded by: Dhal Singh
- Constituency: Durg
- In office 1952–1957 Serving with Jagtarandas
- Preceded by: Office established
- Succeeded by: Sheolal
- Constituency: Bemetara

Member of Central Provinces and Berar Legislative Assembly
- In office 1936—39

Personal details
- Born: Vishwanath Yadavrao Tamaskar; 30 July 1902 Navagarh, Durg district, Central Provinces, British India
- Died: 1970 (aged 67–68)
- Party: Indian National Congress
- Other political affiliations: Praja Socialist Party
- Spouse: Padmavati Tamaskar (m. 1929)
- Children: 5 sons and 5 daughters
- Parent: Yadav Waman Tamaskar (father)
- Education: B.A., L.L.B.
- Alma mater: Maurice College, Nagpur; Law College Nagpur
- Profession: Lawyer

Vishwanath Tamasker was an Indian politician from the state of the Madhya Pradesh. He represented Durg Assembly constituency of undivided Madhya Pradesh Legislative Assembly by winning the 1957 election.
