= Dayaldas Baghel =

Indian politician

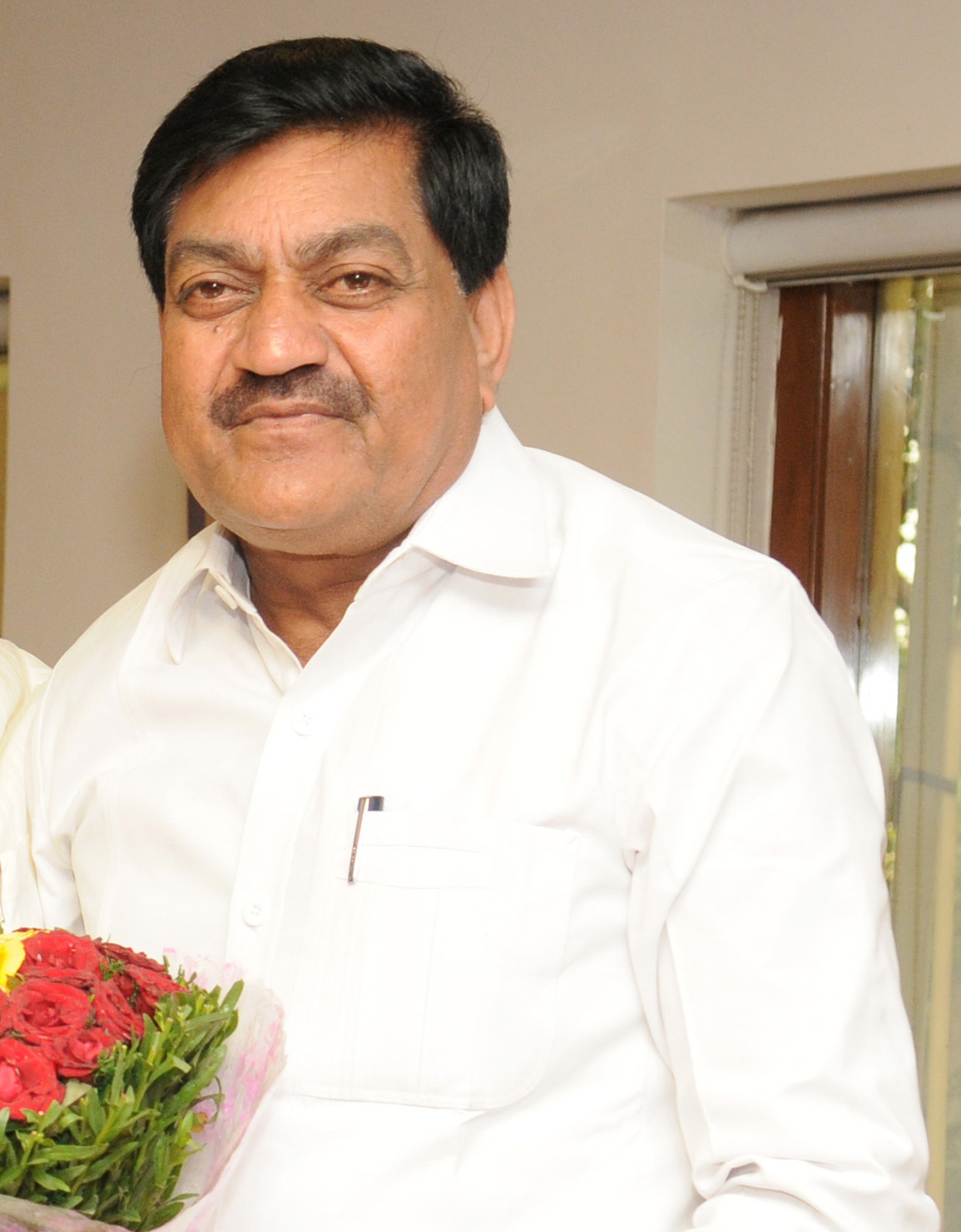

Minister of Food & Civil Supplies Government of Chhattisgarh
- Incumbent
- Assumed office 22 December 2023
- Chief Minister: Vishnu Deo Sai
- Preceded by: Amarjeet Bhagat

Member of Chhattisgarh Legislative Assembly
- Incumbent
- Assumed office 3 December 2023
- Preceded by: Gurudayal Singh Banjare
- Constituency: Navagarh
- In office 2008–2018
- Preceded by: Constituency established
- Succeeded by: Gurudayal Singh Banjare
- Constituency: Navagarh
- In office 2003–2008
- Preceded by: Derhu Prasad Dhritlahre
- Succeeded by: Constituency abolished
- Constituency: Maro

Minister of Cooperatives Government of Chhattisgarh
- In office 22 May 2015 – 11 December 2018
- Chief Minister: Raman Singh
- Preceded by: Punnulal Mohle
- Succeeded by: Prem Sai Singh Tekam

Minister of Tourism & Culture Government of Chhattisgarh
- In office 22 May 2015 – 11 December 2018
- Chief Minister: Raman Singh
- Preceded by: Ajay Chandrakar
- Succeeded by: Tamradhwaj Sahu (Tourism); Amarjeet Bhagat (Culture)

Personal details
- Born: 1 July 1954 (age 72) Kunvara, Nawagarh, Durg district, Madhya Pradesh (now in Bemetara district, Chhattisgarh)
- Party: Bharatiya Janata Party
- Spouse: Amala Baghel
- Children: 2 sons & 4 daughters
- Education: Secondary School Certificate

Dayaldas Baghel (born 1 July 1954) is an Indian politician and current Food, Civil Supplies and Consumer Protection Minister of Chhattisgarh. He is representing Nawagarh in Chhattisgarh Vidhan Sabha. He resides at Village & Post of Kunvara in Tehsil Nawagarh of District Bemetara. He was the minister of Cooperation, Culture and Tourism of Chhattisgarh.
