= Parpodi =

Parpodi Raja Parpodi
- Town
- Nickname: Parpodi
- Location in Chhattisgarh, India Parpodi (India)
- Coordinates: 21.35°N 81.12°E
- Country: India
- State: Chhattisgarh
- District: Bemetara
- Established: 23/05/2013

Government
  - Type: Local Government
  - Body: nagar panchayat
  - President: Shri Dileep Jain
- Elevation: 290 m (950 ft)

Population (2011)
  - Total: 6,000

Languages
  - Official: Hindi, Chhattisgarhi
- Time zone: UTC+5:30 (IST)
- PIN: 491331
- Vehicle registration: CG 25

"Parpodi," also known as "Raja Parpodi," is a town and a Nagar Panchayat in the Bemetara district of Chhattisgarh, India. The town is situated in the district of Bemetara in the state of Chhattisgarh, India. It has a small population and has been declared a "Nagar Panchayat" of the Bemetara district.

Situated along the Durg-Kabirdham road, the town is easily accessible by road from the city of Bemetara /Durg/Raipur, which was the ancient citadel of the Gondwana dynasty, is known for being a historical, religious, and cultural venue. According to popular legend, the name of the town was given after the name of the last Zamindar aunt "Parmeshwari Devi." Most of Parpodi is rigid ground.

On 28 May 2013 Parpodi became a Nagar Panchayat with district headquarters at Bemetara itself but formally this town is under of Durg District, it is now in the Bemetara district. The town is under Saja assembly, and Mr. ravindra choubey is the current MLA of the area. Since 1 January 2012 Parpodi has been under the administration of the Bemetara district of Chhattisgarh.

== Geography ==
Parpodi is located at 21°35′30″N 81°12′21″E. It has an average elevation of 290 metres (950 ft).

Latitude: 21.583333 / 21° 34' 59.9982"

Longitude: 81.216667 / 81° 13' 0.0012"

Province: Chhattisgarh

Country: India (Bharat)

Continent: Asia

== Demographics ==
In 2011, India census Parpodi had a population of approximately 6000. Males constitute 51% of the population and females make up 49%. Parpodi has an average literacy rate of 62%; this is higher than the national average of 59.5%: male literacy is 72% and female literacy is 51%. 15% of the population are children under 6 years.

== Climate ==
Parpodi has a tropical wet and dry climate. Temperatures remain moderate from July through February, with extremely hot temperatures from March to June. The temperature in April and May sometimes rises above 45 °C (113 °F). These summer months also have hot, dry winds. In summer, the temperature can also reach 47 °C. The city receives about 1,300 millimetres (51 in) of rain mostly in the monsoon season from late June to early October. Winters last from November to January and are mild although lows can fall to 6 °C (43 °F).

== Economy ==
The economy of Parpodi is based on agriculture. Almost 70% of the people in town work on farms. This place has great development as it has two banks, Grameen Bank and cooperative bank. The president of cooperative bank is Vijay Dubey, who was elected with a huge number of votes on his side, he is active in regional politics also, and very close to MLA, Ravindra Choubey Ji.

== Culture ==
The culture of this town is influenced by the Chhattisgarhi ethics, rituals and customs. Like other Chhattisgarhi regions, this region also organises mandai, mela at different occasions. Matar is also conducted on behalf of the bhaiduj celebration which is organised on the day after diwali, while mandai and mela are celebrated during February and March. Some Muslim communities also celebrate eid.

== Ethnic groups ==
Most of the people come under the Indian (aryans) ethnicity or under the deccan indo-dravidian ethnicity. Parpodi town is situated just centre of the chhattishgarh and is an active participant in trade - that is why most of the people in this region are vaishya (traders) and natives are tribal.

== Transport ==
The three nearest railway stations, Durg, Raipur, and Rajnandgaon, are 55, 68 and 65 kilometres respectively from Parpodi. Direct trains for Vishakhapatnam, Mumbai, Pune, Ahmedabad, Howrah, Bhubaneswar, Chennai, Trivandrum, Amritsar and New Delhi are available from these railway stations, situated on the main train route of Howrah-Mumbai via Nagpur. The state capital Raipur is an hour's journey from Parpodi. Raipur and Nagpur airports are at a distance of 75 and 280 kilometres, respectively.

== School and colleges ==
- A boys primary school
- A girls primary school
- Rajiv Gandhi: a Higher Secondary School
- Sarojini Naidu: Girls Higher Secondary School.
- Govt. Industrial Training Institute
