= Electoral history of Bhupesh Baghel =

Electoral performance of Indian politician

This is a summary of the electoral history of Bhupesh Baghel, an Indian politician who served as the third Chief Minister of Chhattisgarh from 2018 to 2023. A senior leader of the Indian National Congress, Baghel has represented the Patan constituency in the Chhattisgarh Legislative Assembly for five terms and previously served as a member of the Madhya Pradesh Legislative Assembly.

== Summary ==
Election	House	Constituency	Result	Party
1993	Madhya Pradesh Legislative Assembly	Patan	Won	INC
1998	Madhya Pradesh Legislative Assembly	Patan	Won	INC
2003	Chhattisgarh Legislative Assembly	Patan	Won	INC
2008	Chhattisgarh Legislative Assembly	Patan	Lost	INC
2013	Chhattisgarh Legislative Assembly	Patan	Won	INC
2018	Chhattisgarh Legislative Assembly	Patan	Won	INC
2023	Chhattisgarh Legislative Assembly	Patan	Won	INC
2009	Lok Sabha	Raipur	Lost	INC
2024	Lok Sabha	Rajnandgaon	Lost	INC

== Lok Sabha elections ==
=== General election 2024 ===
2024 Indian general election: Rajnandgaon
Party	Candidate	Votes	%	±%
BJP	Santosh Pandey	7,12,057	49.25	
INC	Bhupesh Baghel	6,67,646	46.18	
Majority		44,411	3.07	
BJP hold		Swing	{{{swing}}}	

=== General election 2009 ===
2009 Indian general election: Raipur
Party	Candidate	Votes	%	±%
BJP	Ramesh Bais	3,64,943	49.19	
INC	Bhupesh Baghel	3,07,042	41.39	
Majority		57,901	7.80	
BJP hold		Swing	{{{swing}}}	

== Chhattisgarh Legislative Assembly elections ==
=== 2023 ===
2023 Chhattisgarh Legislative Assembly election: Patan
Party	Candidate	Votes	%	±%
INC	Bhupesh Baghel	95,438	51.91	+0.06
BJP	Vijay Baghel	75,715	41.18	+6.20
Majority		19,723	10.73	−6.14
INC hold		Swing	{{{swing}}}	

=== 2018 ===
2018 Chhattisgarh Legislative Assembly election: Patan
Party	Candidate	Votes	%	±%
INC	Bhupesh Baghel	84,352	51.85	+4.55
BJP	Motilal Sahu	56,875	34.98	−6.12
Majority		27,477	16.87	+10.67
INC hold		Swing	{{{swing}}}	

=== 2013 ===
2013 Chhattisgarh Legislative Assembly election: Patan
Party	Candidate	Votes	%	±%
INC	Bhupesh Baghel	68,185	47.30	+4.70
BJP	Vijay Baghel	58,842	40.80	−1.80
Majority		9,343	6.50	+6.50
INC gain from BJP		Swing	{{{swing}}}	

=== 2008 ===
2008 Chhattisgarh Legislative Assembly election: Patan
Party	Candidate	Votes	%	±%
BJP	Vijay Baghel	56,750	49.42	
INC	Bhupesh Baghel	48,928	42.61	
Majority		7,822	6.81	
BJP gain from INC		Swing	{{{swing}}}	

=== 2003 ===
2003 Chhattisgarh Legislative Assembly election: Patan
Party	Candidate	Votes	%	±%
INC	Bhupesh Baghel	44,227	34.14	
NCP	Vijay Baghel	37,318	28.81	
Majority		6,909	5.33	
INC hold		Swing	{{{swing}}}	

== Madhya Pradesh Legislative Assembly elections ==
=== 1998 ===
1998 Madhya Pradesh Legislative Assembly election: Patan
Party	Candidate	Votes	%	±%
INC	Bhupesh Baghel	37,758	39.55	
BJP	Nirupama Chandrakar	35,062	36.73	
Majority		2,696	2.82	
INC hold		Swing	{{{swing}}}	

=== 1993 ===
1993 Madhya Pradesh Legislative Assembly election: Patan
Party	Candidate	Votes	%	±%
INC	Bhupesh Baghel	33,391	44.10	
BJP	Kailashpal Chandel	24,198	31.95	
Majority		9,193	12.15	
INC hold		Swing	{{{swing}}}	
