= Lolesara =

- Village
- Location in Chhattisgarh, India Lolesara (India)
- Coordinates: 21.753409°N 81.4906954°E
- Country: India
- State: Chhattisgarh
- District: Bemetara district
- Tehsil: Bemetara

Government
  - Type: Panchayat raj
  - Body: Gram panchayat

Population (2011)
  - Total: 2,004; 1,000/1,004 ♂/♀
  - Scheduled Castes: 326; 174/152 ♂/♀
  - Total Households: 382

Languages Hindi chhattisgarhi
- Time zone: UTC+5:30 (IST)
- Website: https://elolesara.blogspot.com

Lolesara is a village in the Bemetara district of Durg, Chhattisgarh State, India. It is located about 8 kilometres (5.0 mi) away from Bemetara. The village is administrated by Sarpanch.

== Demographics ==
As of 2011, the village had a total number of 382 houses and a population of 2004, of which 1000 are male and 1004 are female. According to the 2011 census of India, 326 people (16.27% of the population) are from Scheduled Castes.

== See also ==
- List of villages in India
