= Durg Assembly constituency =

Former Chhattisgarh Legislative Assembly constituency

Durg
- Former constituency for the Chhattisgarh Legislative Assembly

Constituency details
- Country: India
- Region: Central India
- State: Chhattisgarh
- Division: Durg
- District: Durg
- Established: 1951
- Abolished: 2008

Durg Assembly constituency was a Chhattisgarh Legislative Assembly constituency in Durg district, Chhattisgarh, India.

== Boundaries ==
In the 1951 Delimitation, the constituency comprised Bhilai R.I.C. and patwari circles Nos. 31, 32, 34 to 39 and 141 of Nandkathi R.I.C. of Durg tehsil.

In the 1956 Delimitation, the constituency comprised Durg, Bemetara and Kawardha tahsils of Durg district. The constituency was numbered 137.

In the 1961 Delimitation, the constituency comprised Durg and Anda R.I.Cs. in Durg tahsil. The constituency was numbered 140.

In the 1967 Delimitation, the constituency comprised Durg RIC (excluding PCs 68 and 83), and PCs 26, 28 to 31, 37 and 38 in Nankathi. RIC, in Durg tahsil. The constituency was numbered 141.

In the 1976 Delimitation, the constituency comprised Durg-I and Durg-II RICs and S.A.F. Colony, Kosa Nala, Supela Bazar West, Supela Bazar, Supela Bazar East and Supela Camp West in Bhilainagar and ex-revenue village Chhaoni lying on the periphery of Bhilainagar in Bhilai RIC in Durg tahsil.The constituency was numbered 162.

In the 2008 Delimitation, the constituency was abolished.

== Members of the Legislative Assembly ==
=== Madhya Pradesh ===
Year	Con. No.	Res.	Member	Party
1952	59	None	G. S. Gupta	Indian National Congress
1957	137	None	Vishwanath Tamasker	Praja Socialist Party
1962	140	None	Dhal Singh	Indian National Congress
1967	141	None	R. Jha	Indian National Congress
1972	141	None	Motilal Vora	Indian National Congress
1972	162	None	Motilal Vora	Indian National Congress
1977	162	None	Motilal Vora	Indian National Congress
1980	162	None	Motilal Vora	Indian National Congress (I)
1985	162	None	Motilal Vora	Indian National Congress
1990	162	None	Motilal Vora	Indian National Congress
1993	162	None	Arun Vora	Indian National Congress
1998	162	None	Hemchand Yadav	Bharatiya Janata Party

=== Chhattisgarh ===
Year	Con. No.	Res.	Member	Party
2003	76	None	Hem Chand Yadav	Bharatiya Janata Party
