= Kunvara =

Kunvara is a Village in Nawagarh Tehsil in Bemetara district (earlier in Durg district) of Chhattisgarh State of India.

Dayaldas Baghel belongs to this village and he represent Nawagarh seat in Chhattisgarh Vidhan Sabha.
