= Tamradhwaj Sahu =

Indian politician

Cabinet Minister, Government of Chhattisgarh
- In office 17 December 2018 – 12 December 2023
- Governor: Anusuiya Uikey
- Chief Minister: Bhupesh Baghel
- Ministry and Departments: Home; Public Works Department; Jail; Tourism; Dharmik Nyas And Dharmasv (religious)
- Preceded by: Ram Sewak Paikra
- Succeeded by: Vijay Sharma; Arun Sao; Brijmohan Agrawal

Member of the Chhattisgarh Legislative Assembly
- In office 11 December 2018 – 12 December 2023
- Preceded by: Ramshila Sahu, BJP
- Succeeded by: Lalit Chandrakar
- Constituency: Durg Gramin
- In office 8 December 2008 – 8 December 2013
- Preceded by: Chetan Verma, INC
- Succeeded by: Awadhesh Singh Chandel, BJP
- Constituency: Bemetara
- In office 27 November 1998 – 7 December 2008
- Preceded by: Jogeshwar Sahu, INC
- Succeeded by: constituency abolished
- Constituency: Dhamdha

Member of Parliament, Lok Sabha
- In office 16 May 2014 – 25 December 2018
- Preceded by: Saroj Pandey
- Succeeded by: Vijay Baghel
- Constituency: Durg

Personal details
- Born: 6 August 1949 (age 76) Patora, Central Provinces and Berar, India (now in Chhattisgarh, India)
- Party: Indian National Congress
- Spouse: Kamala Sahu
- Children: 4
- Profession: Activist; Politician
- As of 28 October, 2025 Source: [Tamradhwaj Sahu - Indian govt. portal]

Tamradhwaj Sahu (born 6 August 1949) is an Indian politician of the INC. He was the Home Minister of Chhattisgarh in the Bhupesh Baghel Government. He was a member of the Chhattisgarh Legislative Assembly representing Durg Gramin from 2018-2023.

== Political career ==
Tamradhwaj Sahu was member of parliament to the 16th Lok Sabha from Durg (Lok Sabha constituency), Chhattisgarh. He won the 2014 Indian general election being an Indian National Congress candidate. Before becoming the Member of Parliament, he was a member of Chhattisgarh Legislative Assembly from 1998 until 2013. He again became an MLA from 2018-2023. He however lost in the 2023 Chhattisgarh legislative assembly elections.

== Political views ==
Sahu is inspired by Chandulal Chandrakar, former Politician of Durg. He ventured into politics as a student.

== Personal life ==
Sahu was born in Patora village, Bemetara, Central Provinces and Berar (now Chhattisgarh) on 6 August 1949. He is married to Kamala Sahu. They have three sons and a daughter.

== Social activities ==
He has actively worked for the Sahu Samaj Cultural Activities, and involved in Ramayan Katha.

Year	Position
2001-current	President, District Ramayan Sewa Samiti, Durg
1993-2001	President, Chhattisgarh State Sahu Sangh
1990-1993	President, District Sahu Sangh

== See also ==
- Chhattisgarh Legislative Assembly
- 2013 Chhattisgarh Legislative Assembly election
- 2008 Chhattisgarh Legislative Assembly election

Lok Sabha
Preceded by Saroj Pandey	Member of Parliament for Durg; 2014 – 2018	Succeeded by Vijay Baghel
