= Govindlal Vora =

Indian journalist (1932–2018)

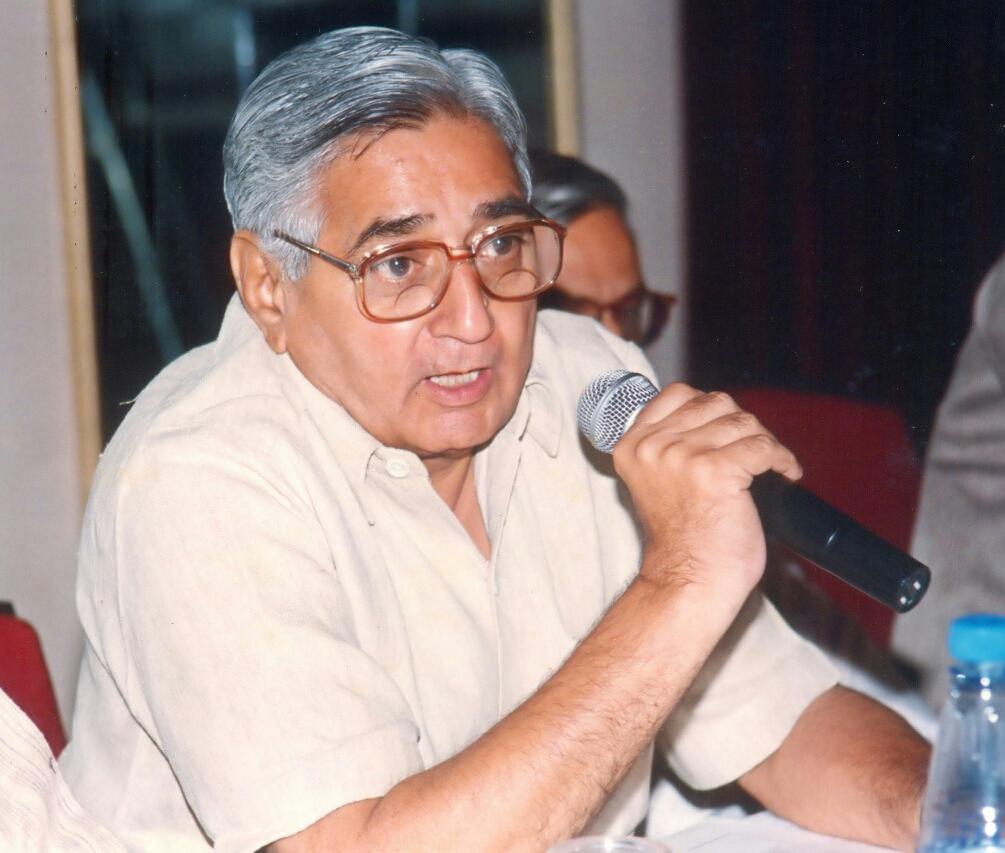
- Born: 12 March 1932; Nagaur, Rajasthan
- Died: 13 May 2018 (aged 86); New Delhi, India
- Education: M.A. (Political Science), Sagar University
- Occupations: Journalist, editor
- Spouse: Prakash Vora
- Children: Vandana Vyas, Ranjana Vyas, Girish Vora, Vibha Vyas, Rajeev Vora
- Parent(s): Mohanlal Vora, Ambadevi Vora
- Relatives: Motilal Vora (brother), Arun Vora (Nephew)

Govindlal Vora (12 March 1932 – 13 May 2018) was an Indian journalist, known for his contribution to Fearless journalism, literature, education and works in various social causes. He was founder editor of Hindi daily Amrit Sandesh. He also headed various trust and societies, in different fields of social welfare. He was active in journalism for 60 years in India.

== Early life and education ==
Govindlal Vora was born on 12 March 1932 in Nimbi Jodha of Nagaur District, Rajasthan, to Mohanlalji Vora and Ambadevi Vora. He did his bachelor's degree in arts in 1954 and received a master's degree in political sciences in 1956 from Sagar University, Madhya Pradesh.

== Journalism and career ==
Govindlal Vora in his college days started as a freelance journalist and columnist in various national daily and later worked with Hindustan Times, Nav Bharat Times, The Statesman, Illustrated Weekly, Telegraph and Jai Hind. At an age of 24, as a journalist he attended the Geneva summit in the cold war era, 18 July 1955 in Geneva, Switzerland. He was well travelled and attended various conferences and summits in different countries, did war reporting (annexation of Goa 1961), India China (Sino India War 1962). In 1959, he was appointed as the editor of undivided Madhya Pradesh. At an early age he became chief editor of Deccan Chronicle. In October 1984, he established his own media company. He was Managing Director and Founder chief editor of Hindi daily Amrit Sandesh. His last foreign travel was with Prime Minister Dr Manmohan Singh where he accompanied him for his visit to G20 summit held at Pittsburg, California, USA. Govindlal Vora also served as:

- Managing director of Pragati Press Pvt Ltd.
- Vice President of Indian Language Newspapers Association
- Managing director of Pragati Prakashan Pvt Ltd
- Chairman of Pragati College of Engineering and Management, Raipur
- Chairman of Pragati College, Raipur

== Controversies ==
During 18 months Period of "the emergency" (26 June 1975 - January 1977) Vora was in major conflict with the then information broadcasting minister Vidya Charan Shukla.

== Politics ==
Vora was well-versed with National International politics and politicians across the globe. His first hand International exposure at an early age kept him well-connected to politicians in India & abroad. But he strictly restricted himself to journalism.

== Death ==
Govindlal Vora died on 13 May 2018 in Fortis Hospital New Delhi.

== Personal life and family ==
Govindlal Vora is survived by his wife Prakash Vora, who herself is a writer and Sanskrit Visharad, two sons and three daughters. His elder brother Motilal Vora is Indian Politician and ex-chief minister of Madhya Pradesh. His son Rajeev Vora is Secretary of Pragati College of Engineering and Management. His nephew Arun Vora is MLA from Durg (CG).
