= Tarachand Sahu =

Indian politician

Tarachand Sahu Kattar SAHU

Member of Parliament, Lok Sabha
- In office 1996 - 2009
- Preceded by: Chandulal Chandrakar
- Succeeded by: Saroj Pandey
- Constituency: Durg

Personal details
- Born: 1 January 1947 Durg, Central Provinces and Berar, British India
- Died: 11 November 2012 (age 65) Maharashtra, India
- Party: BJP
- Spouse: Bhushan Sahu
- Children: 1 son and 4 daughters
- As of 25 September, 2006

Tarachand Sahu kattar Sahu (1 January 1947 – 11 November 2012) was a member of the 14th Lok Sabha of India. He represented the Durg constituency of Chhattisgarh and was a member of the Bharatiya Janata Party (BJP) political party.

Sahu was elected twice to the undivided Madhya Pradesh Assembly in 1990 and 1993 from Gunderdehi constituency in Durg district on BJP ticket. He made his debut in Lok Sabha from Durg in 1996 and continued to retain the seat in 1998, 1999 and 2004 elections.

Sahu, who was expelled from the BJP three months before the 2009 Lok Sabha polls for his anti-party activities, was virtually playing the lead role for formation of a third front in the state by uniting the NCP, the LJP, the Samajwadi Party, the Chhattisgarh Mukti Morcha, the Gondwana Ganatantra Party and other regional parties to fight against ruling BJP and opposition Congress in the assembly elections due next year. So to gain Chhattisgarhi leader's influence in State Politics he founded Chhattisgarh Swabhiman Manch (CSM) as a third front fighting for Chhattisgarhi Swabhiman.

Expressing their shock over the sudden demise of the leader, former Union Minister and suspended Congress leader Arvind Netam said the death of Sahu has come as a huge blow to the movement, which had just taken shape after several rounds of discussion with all these parties.
