= Ashish Kumar Chhabra =

Indian politician

Member of the Chhattisgarh Legislative Assembly
- In office 11 December 2018 – 3 December 2023
- Preceded by: Awadhesh Singh Chandel
- Succeeded by: Dipesh Sahu
- Constituency: Bemetara

Personal details
- Born: 10 October 1981 (age 44) Bemetara
- Party: Indian National Congress
- Spouse: Amrita Kaur Chhabra
- Children: 2
- Parent: Surendra Kumar Chhabra (father)
- Occupation: Transport, Agriculture & Politician

Ashish Kumar Chhabra (born 10 October 1981) is an Indian politician. He was a member of the Chhattisgarh Legislative Assembly representing the Bemetara of Chhattisgarh. He got 74914 votes during the election.
