= Wasudeo Shridhar Kirolikar =

Indian politician

Member of Parliament, Lok Sabha
- In office 1952–1957
- Succeeded by: Mohan Lal Baklial
- Constituency: Durg

Personal details
- Born: 1893 Masur, Karhad Taluka, Satara district, Bombay Presidency, British India (now in Maharashtra, India)
- Died: Unknown
- Party: Indian National Congress

Wasudeo Shridhar Kirolikar was an Indian politician. He was elected to the Lok Sabha, lower house of the Parliament of India as a member of the Indian National Congress.
