= Dipesh Sahu =

Indian politician

Member of Chhattisgarh Legislative Assembly
- Incumbent
- Assumed office 3 December 2023
- Preceded by: Ashish Kumar Chhabra
- Constituency: Bemetara

Personal details
- Born: Dipesh Sahu; 23 January 1988 (age 38) Nawagarh, Bemetara, Chhattisgarh, India
- Party: Bharatiya Janata Party
- Occupation: Politician

Dipesh Sahu (born 23 January 1988) is an Indian politician. He is a member of Bharatiya Janata Party. He is member of the legislative assembly of Chhattisgarh from Bemetara.
