= Hemchand Yadav Vishwavidyalaya =

University in Chhattisgarh, India

- Former name: Durg Vishwavidyalaya
- Type: Public
- Established: 2015; 11 years ago
- Affiliations: UGC
- Chancellor: Governor of Chhattisgarh
- Vice-Chancellor: Sanjay Tiwari
- Location: Durg, Chhattisgarh, India; 21.1956083°N 81.2997669°E
- Campus: Urban
- Website: www.durguniversity.ac.in

Hemchand Yadav Vishwavidyalaya or Hemchand Yadav University, formerly Durg Vishwavidyalaya, is a state university in Durg, Chhattisgarh, India. It was established in 2015 and later renamed in 2018.

== History ==
The University was established in 2015 through the Chhattisgarh Vishwavidyalaya (Sanshodhan) Adhiniyam, 2015, which bifurcated Pandit Ravishankar Shukla University, creating Durg Vishwavidyalaya, with jurisdiction over the districts of Durg, Balod, Bemetara, Rajnandgaon and Kabirdham. The first vice chancellor of the university was Narendra Prasad Dixit. On 12 April 2018, a day after the death of Hemchand Yadav, it was announced that the university would be renamed after him. This came into effect later that year, through the Chhattisgarh Vishwavidyalaya (Sanshodhan) Adhiniyam, 2018.

Shailendra Saraf was appointed VC in 2018. After his resignation in February 2019, Dilip Wasnikar the division commissioner accepted the role of VC as an additional charge. In September 2019 Aruna Palta was appointed VC.

== Campus ==
The university is located in old Girls' PG College Campus Building, Raipur Naka, Durg.

== Affiliated colleges ==
The university has jurisdiction over the districts of Durg, Balod, Bemetara, Rajnandgaon, Mohala-Manpur, Khairagarh and Kabirdham. As of 2024, the university had 158 affiliated colleges, 84 of which were government colleges and the rest were private colleges, including Govt. Vishwanath Yadav Tamaskar Autonomous College, Durg and Rungta College Bhilai.
