= Purushottam Kaushik =

Indian politician (1930–2017)

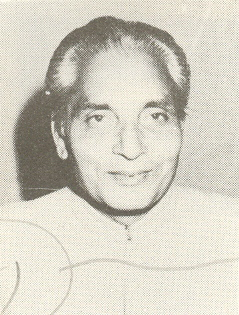

Minister of Information and Broadcasting
- In office 28 July 1979 – 14 January 1980
- Preceded by: L. K. Advani
- Succeeded by: Vasant Sathe

Minister of Tourism and Civil Aviation
- In office 26 March 1977 – 15 July 1979
- Preceded by: Kotha Raghuramaiah
- Succeeded by: Mohammad Shafi Qureshi

Member of Parliament, Lok Sabha
- In office 1989-1991
- Preceded by: Chandulal Chandrakar
- Succeeded by: Chandulal Chandrakar
- Constituency: Durg, Madhya Pradesh
- In office 1977-1980
- Preceded by: Vidya Charan Shukla
- Succeeded by: Keyur Bhushan
- Constituency: Raipur, Madhya Pradesh

Personal details
- Born: 24 September 1930 Mahasamund, Central Provinces, British India
- Died: 5 October 2017 (aged 87) Mahasamund, Chhattisgarh, India
- Party: Janata Dal
- Other party: Samyukta Socialist Party, Janata Party
- Spouse: Amrit Kaushik
- Children: 3
- Occupation: Agriculturist; Lawyer; Politician

Purushottam Lal Kaushik (24 September 1930 – 5 October 2017) was an Indian Politician.

== Details ==
He was elected to the Lok Sabha the lower house of the Indian Parliament from Raipur in 1977 and Durg in 1989 from Madhya Pradesh as a member of the Janata Dal. He was the Minister for Tourism and Civil Aviation in the Morarji Desai ministry and later Minister of Information and Broadcasting in the Charan Singh ministry
