= Shakuntala Singh Portey =

Indian politician

Member of the Chhattisgarh Legislative Assembly
- Incumbent
- Assumed office 3 December 2023
- Preceded by: Prem Sai Singh Tekam
- Constituency: Pratappur

Personal details
- Party: Bharatiya Janata Party

Shakuntala Singh Portey (born 1980) is an Indian politician from Chhattisgarh. She is an MLA from Pratappur Assembly constituency in Surajpur district. She won the 2023 Chhattisgarh Legislative Assembly election representing the Bharatiya Janata Party.

== Early life and education ==
Shakuntala is from Pratappur, Surajpur district, Chhattisgarh. She is the daughter of Lal Bahadur Singh Portey. She completed her graduation in Law in 2014 at Sarguja University, Ambikapur.

== Career ==
Shakuntala won from Pratappur Assembly constituency representing Bharatiya Janata Party in the 2023 Chhattisgarh Legislative Assembly election. She polled 83,796 votes and defeated her nearest rival, Rajkumari Shivbhajan Marabi of Indian National Congress, by a margin of 11,708 votes.
