= Navagarh Assembly constituency =

Legislative Assembly constituency in Chhattisgarh State, India

Coordinates: 21.91°N 81.61°E

Navagarh
- Constituency No. 70 for the Chhattisgarh Legislative Assembly

Constituency details
- Country: India
- Region: Central India
- State: Chhattisgarh
- District: Bemetara
- Lok Sabha constituency: Durg
- Established: 2008
- Total electors: 266,759
- Reservation: SC

Member of Legislative Assembly
- 6th Chhattisgarh Legislative Assembly
- Incumbent Dayaldas Baghel
- Party: Bharatiya Janata Party
- Elected year: 2023
- Preceded by: Gurudayal Singh Banjare

Navagarh is one of the 90 Legislative Assembly constituencies of Chhattisgarh state in India.

It is part of Bemetara district and is reserved for candidates belonging to the Scheduled Castes. As of 2023, it is represented by Dayaldas Baghel of the Bharatiya Janata Party.

== Members of the Legislative Assembly ==
Year	Member	Party
Until 2008: Constituency did not exist
2008	Dayaldas Baghel	Bharatiya Janata Party
2013	Dayaldas Baghel	Bharatiya Janata Party
2018	Gurudayal Singh Banjare	Indian National Congress
2023	Dayaldas Baghel	Bharatiya Janata Party

== Election results ==
=== 2023 ===
2023 Chhattisgarh Legislative Assembly election: Navagarh
Party	Candidate	Votes	%	±%
BJP	Dayaldas Baghel	101,631	50.01	+19.16
INC	Guru Rudra Kumar	86,454	42.54	−7.43
BSP	Omprakash Batchpayi	6,259	3.08	−7.62
Independent	Vinayak Panik	1,835	0.90	
NOTA	None of the Above	1,744	0.86	−0.40
Majority		15,177	7.47	−11.65
Turnout		203,219	76.18	+3.11
BJP gain from INC		Swing		

=== 2018 ===
Chhattisgarh Legislative Assembly Election, 2018: Navagarh
Party	Candidate	Votes	%	±%
INC	Gurudayal Singh Banjare	86,779	49.97	
BJP	Dayaldas Baghel	53,579	30.85	
BSP	Omprakash Batchpayi	18,576	10.70	
Independent	Hemant Kumar Mahilang	3,501	2.02	
Independent	Hiralal Amant	3,389	1.95	
NOTA	None of the Above	2,196	1.26	
Majority		33,200	19.12	
Turnout		173,656	73.07	
INC gain from BJP		Swing		

== See also ==
- List of constituencies of the Chhattisgarh Legislative Assembly
- Bemetara district
