= Domanlal Korsewada =

Indian politician (1948–2026)

Member of Chhattisgarh Legislative Assembly
- In office 3 December 2023 – 30 October 2026
- Preceded by: Guru Rudra Kumar
- Constituency: Ahiwara

Member of Chhattisgarh Legislative Assembly
- In office 2008–2013
- Preceded by: Constituency established
- Succeeded by: Rajmahant Sanwla Ram Dahre
- Constituency: Ahiwara

Personal details
- Born: Domanlal Korsewada; 12 August 1948 Ahiwara, Durg district, Central Provinces and Berar, India
- Died: 30 October 2026 (aged 78) Hyderabad, Telangana, India
- Party: Bharatiya Janata Party
- Education: M.A., B.Ed.
- Occupation: Politics

Domanlal Korsewada (12 August 1948 – 30 October 2026) was an Indian politician from Chhattisgarh. He was a two time MLA from Ahiwara Assembly constituency, which is reserved for Scheduled Caste community, in Durg District. Korsewada won the 2023 Chhattisgarh Legislative Assembly election, representing the Bharatiya Janata Party.

== Early life and education ==
Domanlal Korsewada was from Ahiwara, Durg District, Chhattisgarh. He was the son of Nammu Das Korsewada. He completed his M.A. in 1985 at Pandit Ravishanker Shukla University, Raipur, and also did B.Ed.

== Political career ==
Korsewada first became an MLA, representing the Bharatiya Janata Party, winning the 2008 Chhattisgarh Legislative Assembly election. He regained the seat for BJP after two terms in the 2023 Chhattisgarh Legislative Assembly election, where he defeated his nearest rival, Nirmal Korse of the Indian National Congress, by a margin of 25,263 votes. He was the oldest MLA in the 2023 Chhattisgarh Legislative Assembly.

== Death ==
On 30 October 2026, Korsewada died at Yashoda Hospital in Hyderabad while undergoing treatment for a prolonged lung infection. He was 78.
