= Guru Rudra Kumar =

Indian politician

Minister of Public Health & Engineering Village Industries Government of Chhattisgarh
- In office 25 December 2018 – 3 December 2023
- Chief Minister: Bhupesh Baghel
- Preceded by: Ram Sewak Paikra
- Succeeded by: Arun Sao

Member of Chhattisgarh Legislative Assembly
- In office 11 December 2018 – 3 December 2023
- Preceded by: Rajmahant Sanwla Ram Dahre
- Succeeded by: Domanlal Korsewada
- Constituency: Ahiwara

Personal details
- Born: 23 July 1977 (age 48)
- Party: Indian National Congress
- Occupation: Politician

Guru Rudra Kumar (born 23 July 1977) is an Indian politician. He is member of the Indian National Congress. He was minister in Baghel ministry. He previously served as member of the legislative assembly of Chhattisgarh from Ahiwara.
