= Kharsia =

- Town
- Kharsia, Chhattisgarh Kharsia (India)
- Coordinates: 21.97°N 83.12°E
- Country: India
- State: Chhattisgarh
- District: Raigarh
- Elevation: 245 m (804 ft)

Population (2012)
  - Total: 18,020

Languages
  - Official: Hindi, Chhattisgarhi, Marwari
- Time zone: UTC+5:30 (IST)
- Vehicle registration: CG 13
- Sex ratio: 2:1 ♂/♀

Kharsia is a town and Municipality city in Raigarh District of Chhattisgarh State, India. It's also a Tehsil Headquarter.

== Geography ==
Kharsia is located at 21.97°N 83.12°E. It has an average elevation of 245 m (804 ft).

== Demographics ==
As of 2001 India census, Kharsia had a population of 17,387. Males constitute 51% of the population and females 49%. Kharsia has an average literacy rate of 71%, higher than the national average of 64.84%: male literacy is 79%, and female literacy is 63%. In Kharsia, 14% of the population is under 6 years of age.

== Economy ==
Kharsia has witnessed major changes in its economic activities in last decade. It has very elaborate type of economy ranging from agriculture activities to ispat and power industries. Power plants have been installed around the city which are driving the financial system of the town and villages.

== Government ==
Kharsia is one of the 90 Legislative Assembly constituencies of Chhattisgarh. Kharsia is considered to be a strongest stronghold Indian National Congress in Chhattisgarh state. Umesh Nandkumar Patel is mla from Kharasia assembly constituency.

== Transport ==
Kharsia is a station on the Tatanagar–Bilaspur section of Howrah-Nagpur-Mumbai line. It is also connected to major cities like Bilaspur, Raipur, Raigarh, Jharsuguda, Ambikapur through state and national highways.

== Notable people ==
- Late Lakhiram Agrawal, Former Madhya Pradesh and Chhattisgarh BJP President and ex-Rajya Sabha MP
- Late Nand Kumar Patel, President Chhattisgarh Pradesh Congress Committees, First Home minister of Chhattisgarh
- Umesh Nandkumar Patel, Indian Politician, MLA from Kharasia and cabinet minister in chhattisgarh government
