= Kharsia Assembly constituency =

Legislative Assembly constituency in Chhattisgarh State, India

Coordinates: 21.99°N 83.1°E

Kharsia
- Constituency No. 18 for the Chhattisgarh Legislative Assembly

Constituency details
- Country: India
- Region: Central India
- State: Chhattisgarh
- District: Raigarh
- Lok Sabha constituency: Raigarh
- Established: 1977
- Total electors: 215,550
- Reservation: None

Member of Legislative Assembly
- 6th Chhattisgarh Legislative Assembly
- Incumbent Umesh Nandkumar Patel
- Party: Indian National Congress
- Elected year: 2018
- Preceded by: Nand Kumar Patel

Kharsia is one of the 90 Legislative Assembly constituencies of Chhattisgarh state in India. It is in Raigarh district.Kharsia is a strong fort of congress party in chattisgarh.

== Members of Legislative Assembly ==
Year	Member	Party
Madhya Pradesh Legislative Assembly
1977	Laxmi Prasad Patel	Indian National Congress
1980	Laxmi Prasad Patel	Indian National Congress (I)
1985	Laxmi Prasad Patel	Indian National Congress
1988^	Arjun Singh	Indian National Congress
1990	Nand Kumar Patel	Indian National Congress
1993	Nand Kumar Patel	Indian National Congress
1998	Nand Kumar Patel	Indian National Congress
Chhattisgarh Legislative Assembly
2003	Nand Kumar Patel	Indian National Congress
2008	Nand Kumar Patel	Indian National Congress
2013	Umesh Nandkumar Patel	Indian National Congress
2018	Umesh Nandkumar Patel	Indian National Congress
2023	Umesh Nandkumar Patel	Indian National Congress

^by-election

== Election results ==
=== 2023 ===
2023 Chhattisgarh Legislative Assembly election: Kharsia
Party	Candidate	Votes	%	±%
INC	Umesh Patel	100,988	53.74	+0.82
BJP	Mahesh Sahu	79,332	42.22	−1.17
AAP	Praveen Vijay Jaiswal	2,335	1.24	
NOTA	None of the Above	1,726	0.92	−0.41
Majority		21,656	11.52	+1.99
Turnout		187919	87.18	−0.25
INC hold		Swing		

=== 2018 ===
Chhattisgarh Legislative Assembly Election, 2018: Kharsia
Party	Candidate	Votes	%	±%
INC	Umesh Patel	94,201	52.92	
BJP	O.P Choudhary	77,234	43.39	
NOTA	None of the Above	2,368	1.33	
Majority		16,967	9.53	
Turnout		1,78,006	87.43	
INC hold		Swing		

== See also ==
- List of constituencies of the Chhattisgarh Legislative Assembly
- Raigarh district
