= Bhilai Nagar Assembly constituency =

Legislative Assembly constituency in Chhattisgarh State, India

Coordinates: 21.2°N 81.34°E

Bhilai Nagar
- Constituency No. 65 for the Chhattisgarh Legislative Assembly

Constituency details
- Country: India
- Region: Central India
- State: Chhattisgarh
- District: Durg
- Lok Sabha constituency: Durg
- Established: 1957
- Total electors: 169,013
- Reservation: None

Member of Legislative Assembly
- 6th Chhattisgarh Legislative Assembly
- Incumbent Devendra Yadav
- Party: Indian National Congress
- Elected year: 2023
- Preceded by: Prem Prakash Pandey

Bhilai Nagar is one of the 90 Legislative Assembly constituencies of Chhattisgarh state in India. It is in Durg district.

== Members of the Legislative Assembly ==
Year	Member	Party
Madhya Pradesh Legislative Assembly
1957	Govind Singh	Indian National Congress
1962	Gopal Singh	Indian National Congress
1967	D. S. Gupta	Indian National Congress
1972	Phoolchand Bafna	Indian National Congress
1977	Dinkar Dange	Janata Party
1980	Phoolchand Bafna	Indian National Congress
1985	Ravi Arya	Indian National Congress
1990	Prem Prakash Pandey	Bharatiya Janata Party
1993	Prem Prakash Pandey	Bharatiya Janata Party
1998	Badruddin Quraishi	Indian National Congress
Chhattisgarh Legislative Assembly
2003	Prem Prakash Pandey	Bharatiya Janata Party
2008	Badruddin Quraishi	Indian National Congress
2013	Prem Prakash Pandey	Bharatiya Janata Party
2018	Devendra Yadav	Indian National Congress
2023	Devendra Yadav	Indian National Congress

== Election results ==
=== 2023 ===
2023 Chhattisgarh Legislative Assembly election: Bhilai Nagar
Party	Candidate	Votes	%	±%
INC	Devendra Yadav	54,405	48.47	+0.18
BJP	Prem Prakash Pandey	53,141	47.34	+1.74
JCC	Rituraj Verma	1,219	1.09	
BSP	Nadia Bhooshan	1,028	0.92	−1.60
NOTA	None of the Above	925	0.82	−0.27
Majority		1,264	1.13	−1.56
Turnout		112,243	66.41	−1.06
INC hold		Swing		

=== 2018 ===
Chhattisgarh Legislative Assembly Election, 2018: Bhilai Nagar
Party	Candidate	Votes	%	±%
INC	Devendra Yadav	51,044	48.29	
BJP	Prem Prakash Pandey	48,195	45.60	
BSP	Deenanath Jaiswar	2,662	2.52	
NOTA	None of the Above	1,147	1.09	
Majority		2,849	2.69	
Turnout		105,693	67.47	
INC gain from BJP		Swing		

== See also ==
- List of constituencies of the Chhattisgarh Legislative Assembly
- Durg district
