= Bemetara Assembly constituency =

Legislative Assembly constituency in Chhattisgarh State, India

Coordinates: 21.71°N 81.53°E

Bemetara
- Constituency No. 69 for the Chhattisgarh Legislative Assembly

Constituency details
- Country: India
- Region: Central India
- State: Chhattisgarh
- District: Bemetara
- Lok Sabha constituency: Durg
- Established: 2003
- Total electors: 247,204
- Reservation: None

Member of Legislative Assembly
- 6th Chhattisgarh Legislative Assembly
- Incumbent Dipesh Sahu
- Party: Bharatiya Janata Party
- Elected year: 2023
- Preceded by: Ashish Kumar Chhabra

Bemetara is one of the 90 Legislative Assembly constituencies of Chhattisgarh state in India.

It comprises Berla tehsil and parts of Bemetara tehsil and Dhamdha tehsil, all in Bemetara district.

== Members of the Legislative Assembly ==
Election	Name	Party
Madhya Pradesh Legislative Assembly
1952	V. Y. Tamaskar	Independent politician
1952	Jagtarandas	Indian National Congress
1957	Sheolal	Indian National Congress
1957	Laxman Prasad	Indian National Congress
1962	Laxman Prasad	Indian National Congress
1967	G. R. Tamaskar	Independent politician
1972	Laxman Prasad Vaidya	Indian National Congress
1977	Laxman Prasad Vaidya	Indian National Congress
1980	Ravendra Singh	Indian National Congress
1985	Ravendra Singh	Indian National Congress
1990	Mahesh Tiwari	Janata Dal
1993	Chetan Singh Verma	Indian National Congress
1998	Mahesh Tiwari	Bharatiya Janata Party
Chhattisgarh Legislative Assembly
2003	Chetan Singh Verma	Indian National Congress
2008	Tamradhwaj Sahu	Indian National Congress
2013	Awadhesh Singh Chandel	Bharatiya Janata Party
2018	Ashish Kumar Chhabra	Indian National Congress
2023	Dipesh Sahu	Bharatiya Janata Party

== Election results ==
=== 2023 ===
2023 Chhattisgarh Legislative Assembly election: Bemetara
Party	Candidate	Votes	%	±%
BJP	Dipesh Sahu	97,731	49.60	+20.79
INC	Ashish Kumar Chhabra	88,597	44.97	+1.62
Independent	Rohit Sinha	2,880	1.46	
Independent	Jitendra Navrange	2,165	1.10	
NOTA	None of the Above	498	0.25	−1.94
Majority		9,134	4.63	−9.91
Turnout		197,031	79.70	+1.23
BJP gain from INC		Swing		

=== 2018 ===
Chhattisgarh Legislative Assembly Election, 2018: Bemetara
Party	Candidate	Votes	%	±%
INC	Ashish Kumar Chhabra	74,914	43.35	
BJP	Awadhesh Singh Chandel	49,783	28.81	
JCC	Yogesh Tiwari	28,332	16.40	New
Independent	Sanjeev Agrawal	4,374	2.53	
Independent	Sohan Lal Nishad	4,275	2.47	
NOTA	Churaman Singh Sahu	1,713	0.99	
NOTA	None of the Above	3,789	2.19	
Majority		25,131	14.54	
Turnout		172,807	78.47	
INC gain from BJP		Swing		

== See also ==
- List of constituencies of the Chhattisgarh Legislative Assembly
- Bemetara district
