= Ahiwara Assembly constituency =

Legislative Assembly constituency in Chhattisgarh State, India

Coordinates: 21.35°N 81.4°E

Ahiwara
- Constituency No. 67 for the Chhattisgarh Legislative Assembly

Constituency details
- Country: India
- Region: Central India
- State: Chhattisgarh
- District: Durg
- Lok Sabha constituency: Durg
- Established: 2008
- Total electors: 244,787
- Reservation: SC

Member of Legislative Assembly
- 6th Chhattisgarh Legislative Assembly
- Incumbent Vacant
- Party: Bharatiya Janata Party
- Elected year: 2023
- Preceded by: Guru Rudra Kumar

Ahiwara is one of the 90 Legislative Assembly constituencies of Chhattisgarh state in India.

It comprises parts of Dhamdha tehsil, Durg tehsil and Patan tehsil, all in Durg district, and is reserved for candidates belonging to the Scheduled Castes.

== Members of the Legislative Assembly ==
Election	Name	Party
Prior to 2008: Constituency did not exist
2008	Domanlal Korsewada	Bharatiya Janata Party
2013	Rajmahant Sanwla Ram Dahre	Bharatiya Janata Party
2018	Guru Rudra Kumar	Indian National Congress
2023	Domanlal Korsewada	Bharatiya Janata Party

== Election results ==
=== Assembly Election 2023 ===
2023 Chhattisgarh Legislative Assembly election : Ahiwara
Party	Candidate	Votes	%	±%
BJP	Domanlal Korsewada	96,717	55.15	▲18.98
INC	Nirmal Kosre	71,454	40.74	▼15.52
JCP	Arun Gandharva (Note: Johar Chhattisgarh Party)	1,816	1.04	New
BSP	Inder Lal Lahare	1,609	0.92	▼2.79
NOTA	None of the Above	1,599	0.91	▼1.42
JCC	Riti Deshlahra	1,252	0.71	New
Margin of victory		25,263	14.41	▼5.69
Turnout		1,75,370	72.32	▲0.09
Registered electors		2,44,787		▲11.06
BJP gain from INC		Swing	▼1.12	

=== Assembly Election 2018 ===
2018 Chhattisgarh Legislative Assembly election : Ahiwara
Party	Candidate	Votes	%	±%
INC	Guru Rudra Kumar	88,735	56.27	▲24.61
BJP	Rajmahant Sanwla Ram Dahre	57,048	36.17	▼18.45
BSP	Dr.Shobha Ram Banjare	5,844	3.71	▲2.78
NOTA	None of the Above	3,681	2.33	▼0.98
Independent	Ram Kumar Survanshi	1,513	0.96	New
AAP	Ajay Ramteke	1,178	0.75	New
Margin of victory		31,687	20.09	▼2.87
Turnout		1,57,702	73.26	▼1.48
Registered electors		2,20,416		▲16.71
INC gain from BJP		Swing	▲1.64	

=== Assembly Election 2013 ===
2013 Chhattisgarh Legislative Assembly election : Ahiwara
Party	Candidate	Votes	%	±%
BJP	Rajmahnt Sanwla Ram Dahre	75,337	54.63	▲4.37
INC	Ashok Dongre	43,661	31.66	▼7.60
Chattisgarh Swabhiman Manch	Vimal Kumar Bande	11,085	8.04	New
NOTA	None of the Above	4,575	3.32	New
Independent	Virendra Kurre	1,432	1.04	New
Independent	Shakuntala Shobharam Banjare	1,277	0.93	New
BSP	Adhivakta Pravin Kumar Kurrey	1,272	0.92	▼2.45
Shakti Sena (Bharat Desh)	Shailendra Banjare (Shakti Putra)	1,268	0.92	New
Margin of victory		31,676	22.97	▲11.97
Turnout		1,37,914	75.48	▲5.38
Registered electors		1,88,860		▲11.08
BJP hold		Swing	▲4.37	

=== Assembly Election 2008 ===
2008 Chhattisgarh Legislative Assembly election : Ahiwara
Party	Candidate	Votes	%	±%
BJP	Domanlal Korsewada	57,795	50.25	New
INC	Oni Kumar Mahilang	45,144	39.25	New
BSP	Mangal Das Chandel	3,875	3.37	New
Independent	Shailendra Banjare	3,700	3.22	New
Independent	Ram Bagas Bharti	1,456	1.27	New
Margin of victory		12,651	11.00	
Turnout		1,15,004	67.66	
Registered electors		1,70,015		
BJP win (new seat)				

== See also ==
- List of constituencies of the Chhattisgarh Legislative Assembly
- Durg district
