= Motilal Vora =

Indian politician (1928–2020)

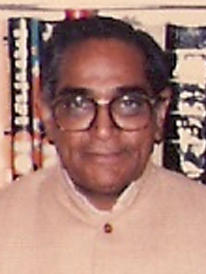

Member of Parliament, Lok Sabha
- In office 10 March 1998 – 26 April 1999
- Preceded by: Ashok Sharma
- Succeeded by: Raman Singh
- Constituency: Rajnandgaon, Madhya Pradesh

Governor of Uttar Pradesh
- In office 26 May 1993 – 3 May 1996
- President: Shankar Dayal Sharma
- Preceded by: B. Satya Narayan Reddy
- Succeeded by: Mohammad Shafi Qureshi

Minister of Health and Family Welfare
- In office 14 February 1988 – 24 January 1989
- Prime Minister: Rajiv Gandhi
- Preceded by: Pamulaparthi Venkata Narasimha Rao
- Succeeded by: Ram Niwas Mirdha

Minister of Civil Aviation
- In office 14 February 1988 – 25 June 1988
- Prime Minister: Rajiv Gandhi
- Preceded by: Jagdish Tytler
- Succeeded by: Shivraj Patil

Member of Parliament, Rajya Sabha
- In office 10 April 2002 – 9 April 2020
- Succeeded by: Phulo Devi Netam
- Constituency: Chhattisgarh
- In office 3 April 1988 – 8 March 1989
- Succeeded by: Ghufran Azam
- Constituency: Madhya Pradesh

13th Chief Minister of Madhya Pradesh
- In office 25 January 1989 – 8 December 1989
- Preceded by: Arjun Singh
- Succeeded by: Shyama Charan Shukla
- In office 13 March 1985 – 13 February 1988
- Preceded by: Arjun Singh
- Succeeded by: Arjun Singh

Member of Madhya Pradesh Legislative Assembly
- In office 1989 – 1992
- Preceded by: Himself
- Succeeded by: Arun Vora
- Constituency: Durg
- In office 1972 – 1988
- Preceded by: R Jha
- Succeeded by: Himself
- Constituency: Durg

Personal details
- Born: 20 December 1928 Nimbi Jodhan, Jodhpur State, British India (present-day Nagaur District, Rajasthan, India)
- Died: 21 December 2020 (aged 92) New Delhi, India
- Cause of death: COVID infection
- Spouse: Shanti Devi Vora
- Children: Four daughters, two sons, including Arun
- Occupation: Politics
- Profession: Journalist, politician and social worker

Motilal Vora (20 December 1928 – 21 December 2020) was an Indian politician belonging to the Indian National Congress (INC).

He served as Chief Minister of Madhya Pradesh (1985–1988; 1989). He was born in Nimbi Jodha, Jodhpur State, British India. He was also Governor of Uttar Pradesh from 1993 to 1996.

== Early life ==
Vora was born on 20 December 1928 in Nimbi Jodha in the Jodhpur State, within the Rajputana Agency of British India (now in the Nagour district of Rajasthan, India) into a Pushkarna Brahmin family. His parents were Mohanlal Vora and Amba Bai. His forefathers came to Nimbi Jodha from Phalodi. He received his education at Raipur and Kolkata. He had also worked with several newspapers for many years. He married Shanti Devi Vora. The couple had four daughters and two sons. His son Arun Vora is an MLA from Durg, Chhattisgarh, having won three elections as MLA. His brother Govindlal Vora was a veteran journalist and Chief Editor of Amrit Sandesh. His nephew Rajeev Vora is Secretary of Pragati College of Engineering and Management, Raipur.

== State politics ==
In 1968, Vora, then, a member of Samajwadi party, became a member of the Municipal Committee of Durg (then part of Madhya Pradesh). Around 1970, he, with the help of Prabhat Tiwari, was introduced to Pt. Kishorilal Shukla of INC and joined INC. He was elected to the Legislative Assembly of Madhya Pradesh in 1972 on an INC ticket. He was elected to Legislative Assembly again in 1977 and 1980. He was appointed a minister of State in Arjun Singh's Cabinet, and was in-charge of the Higher Education Department. He was elevated to the Cabinet Minister in 1983. He also served as the Deputy Chairman of Madhya Pradesh State Road Transport Corporation during 1981–84.

On 13 March 1985, Vora was appointed Chief Minister of Madhya Pradesh. He resigned from the post of Chief Minister on 13 February 1988, to join the Union Government.

== National politics ==
On 14 February 1988, Vora became a member of the Rajya Sabha, and assumed the office of Union Minister of Health, Family Welfare and Civil Aviation. He was a cabinet minister in Government of India. He was appointed Governor of Uttar Pradesh on 16 May 1993 and held office until 3 May 1996. Motilal Vora was in 1998–99 Member of the 12th Lok Sabha.

== Role in the Indian National Congress ==
Vora was very close to high command of INC, and supported nomination of Rahul Gandhi as the party's Prime Ministerial candidate. In the 1980s, he served as the President of the Madhya Pradesh Congress Committee, the party's state unit.

Vora held important positions in all the three entities involved in the National Herald Case: the Associated Journals Limited (AJL), the Young Indian and the All India Congress Committee (AICC). He became the chairman and managing director of AJL on 22 March 2002. He served as the AICC treasurer before that. He was a 12% shareholder and a Director of Young Indian.

== Electoral History ==
=== Rajya Sabha ===
Position	Party	Constituency	From	To	Tenure
Member of Parliament, Rajya Sabha (1st Term)	INC	Madhya Pradesh	3 April 1988	8 March 1989	339 days
Member of Parliament, Rajya Sabha (2nd Term)	INC	Chhattisgarh	10 April 2002	9 April 2008	5 years, 365 days
Member of Parliament, Rajya Sabha (3rd Term)	INC	Chhattisgarh	10 April 2008	9 April 2014	5 years, 364 days
Member of Parliament, Rajya Sabha (4th Term)	INC	Chhattisgarh	10 April 2014	9 April 2020	5 years, 365 days

== Death ==
Vora died from complications from COVID-19 during the COVID-19 pandemic in India, one day after his 92nd birthday.

Madhya Pradesh Legislative Assembly
Preceded by R. Jha	Member of Legislative Assembly for Durg; 1972–1988	Vacant Title next held by Himself
Vacant Title last held by Himself	Member of Legislative Assembly for Durg; 1989–1992	Succeeded by Arun Vora
Rajya Sabha
Preceded by	Member of Parliament from Madhya Pradesh; 3 April 1988 – 8 March 1989	Succeeded by Ghufran Azam
Preceded by	Member of Parliament from Chhattisgarh; 10 April 2002 –9 April 2020	Succeeded by
Lok Sabha
Preceded by Ashok Sharma	Member of Parliament for Rajnandgaon; 1998–1999	Succeeded by Raman Singh
Political offices
Preceded by Arjun Singh	Chief minister of Madhya Pradesh; 1985–1988	Succeeded by Arjun Singh
Preceded by Arjun Singh	Chief minister of Madhya Pradesh; 25 January 1989 – 9 December 1989	Succeeded by Shyama Charan Shukla
Preceded by P. V. Narasimha Rao	Minister of Health and Family Welfare; 14 February 1988 – 24 January 1989	Succeeded by Ram Niwas Mirdha
Preceded by Jagdish Tytler	Minister of Civil Aviation; 14 February 1988 – 25 June 1988	Succeeded by Shivraj Patil; Minister of State (Independent Charge)
Preceded by B. Satya Narayan Reddy	Governor of Uttar Pradesh; 26 May 1993 – 3 May 1996	Succeeded by Mohammad Shafi Qureshi
