= Saroj Pandey =

Indian politician (born 1968)

National Vice President of Bharatiya Janata Party
- Incumbent
- Assumed office 29 July 2023
- President: J. P. Nadda Nitin Nabin

Member of Parliament, Rajya Sabha
- In office 3 April 2018 – 2 April 2024
- Preceded by: Bhushan Lal Jangde
- Succeeded by: Devendra Pratap Singh
- Constituency: Chhattisgarh

National General Secretary of Bharatiya Janata Party
- In office 16 August 2014 – 26 September 2020
- President: Amit Shah; J. P. Nadda

President of the BJP Mahila Morcha
- In office 24 April 2013 – 21 August 2014
- Preceded by: Smriti Irani
- Succeeded by: Vijaya Rahatkar

Member of Parliament, Lok Sabha
- In office 16 May 2009 – 16 May 2014
- Preceded by: Tarachand Sahu
- Succeeded by: Tamradhwaj Sahu
- Constituency: Durg

Member of Chhattisgarh Legislative Assembly
- In office 8 December 2008 – 30 May 2009
- Preceded by: Constituency established
- Succeeded by: Bhajan Singh
- Constituency: Vaishali Nagar

Mayor of Durg Municipal Corporation
- In office 2000–2010

Personal details
- Born: 22 June 1968 (age 58) Bhilai, Chhattisgarh, India
- Party: Bharatiya Janata Party
- Education: Bhilai Mahila College, Pandit Ravishankar University; M.Sc. (Child Development)
- Occupation: Politician
- Website: Official Website

Saroj Pandey (born 22 June 1968) is an Indian politician belonging to the Bharatiya Janata Party (BJP). She is the National Vice President of Bharatiya Janata Party. Previsously, she served as member of the Rajya Sabha, upper house of the Indian Parliament and also served as National General Secretary of Bharatiya Janata Party. Prior to becoming Rajya Sabha MP, she was elected to 15th Lok Sabha from Durg and was also Member of Chhattisgarh Legislative Assembly.

== Early life ==
Saroj Pandey was born to Shyamji Pandey and Gulab Devi Pandey on 22 June 1968. She studied M.Sc. (Child Development) at Bhilai Mahila College, Pt. Ravishankar University, Rat elected as Mayor of Durg in 2000 and got re-elected in 2005. She got elected as the first MLA of Vaishali Nagar in 2008 and then BJP fielded her for 2009 Indian general election from Durg and she won and held post of Mayor, MLA and MP at same time. On 24 April 2013, she was appointed National President of BJP Mahila Morcha (woman wing of Bharatiya Janata Party). She lost 2014 Lok Sabha election to Tamradhwaj Sahu of Congress, but in spite of her defeat she was appointed National General Secretary of Bharatiya Janata Party and elected to Rajya Sabha in March 2018. She also contested 2024 Lok Sabha election from Korba against Jyotsna Mahant but lost by margin of 43,283 votes.

Pandey served as a general secretary and spokesperson of the party, then she held the position of National Secretary of BJP before taking charge as National President of BJP Mahila Morcha.

== Awards and recognition ==
Saroj is a holder of World record for holding the post of a Mayor, M.L.A. and M.P. at the same time and this record is nominated for Guinness Book of World Records and Limca Book of Records. She also holds the record for having longest term as a mayor from Durg, for continuous 10 years and has also received the Best Mayor award.
