= Lakkhiram Agarwal =

Indian politician

Lakhiram Agrawal
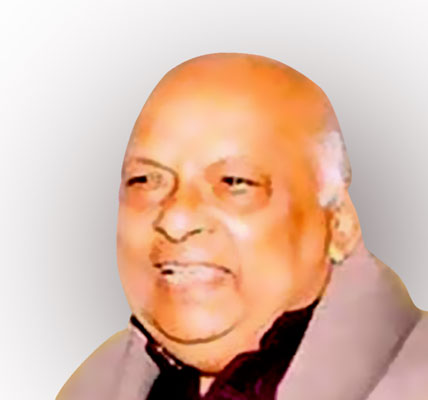

Member of Parliament, Rajya Sabha
- In office 1 November 2000 – 9 April 2002
- Succeeded by: Ramadhar Kashyap
- Constituency: Chhattisgarh
- In office 10 April 1990 – 31 October 2000
- Constituency: Madhya Pradesh

Personal details
- Born: 13 February 1932 Kharsia, Central Provinces and Berar, British India
- Died: 24 January 2009 (aged 76) Bilaspur, Chhattisgarh, India
- Party: Bharatiya Janata Party
- Spouse: Marwan Devi
- Children: Brijmohan Agrawal, Amar Agrawal, Sajan Agrawal, Manoj Agrawal, Bajrang Agrawal
- Parent(s): Mansha Ram Agarwal (father); Rukmani Devi (mother)
- Education: Middle school
- Occupation: Philanthropist, Social worker, Humanitarian, Businessman

Lakhiram Agrawal (13 February 1932 – 24 January 2009) was an Indian politician from the Bharatiya Janta Party (BJP). He was a member of the Rajya Sabha from 1990 to 2002 representing Madhya Pradesh and later Chhattisgarh. He was the state president of the BJP in Madhya Pradesh from 1990 to 2000, and became the state president of Chhattisgarh BJP after the bifurcation of Madhya Pradesh.

== Personal life ==
Lakhiram Agrawal was born on 13 February 1932 to Mansha Ram Agrawal and Rukmani Devi in Kharsia, Raigarh district. He married Marwan Devi in 1950 and had five sons and one daughter. His son Amar Agrawal is a cabinet minister in the Government of Chhattisgarh, holding the portfolios of Taxation, Commerce and the Public health Department. He was educated until middle school in Naharpalli, Kharsia.

== Political career ==
Agrawal became active in politics in 1960. He had served as the chairman of Kharsia municipal council from 1964 to 1969, the president of the District Cooperative Bank, Raigarh from 1977 to 1980, and the vice-president of the Madhya Pradesh State Marketing Association from 1977 to 1980. He was detained under the Maintenance of Internal Security Act in 1975 during the emergency. He became the State General Secretary of Madhya Pradesh BJP in 1983. He was a member of the Rajya Sabha from 10 April 1990 to 31 October 2000 representing Madhya Pradesh, and from 1 November 2000 to 9 April 2002 representing Chhattisgarh. Agrawal was a supporter of the formation of Chhattisgarh as a separate state. Nand Kumar Sai, in a 2010 interview, said that Agrawal was one of the contenders for the chief minister post after the 2003 Chhattisgarh Legislative Assembly election, along with Raman Singh and Dilip Singh Judeo.

== Death ==
Agrawal died on 24 January 2009 after being admitted to Apollo Hospital, Bilaspur. He was cremated with state honors in Kharsia. Raman Singh, Shivraj Singh Chouhan, Kailash Chandra Joshi, Sumitra Mahajan, and Vikram Verma attended the funeral and paid their tributes to Agrawal. Chauhan termed Agrawal as "an organiser and a devotee of nationalist values".

== Legacy ==
A medical college in Raigarh was named after Agrawal in 2013. During the inauguration of a statue of Agrawal by Nitin Gadkari in Kharsia, Raman Singh said that Agrawal was a contributor to the "identity of Chhattisgarh as a developed state".

== Electoral History ==
=== Rajya Sabha ===
Position	Party	Constituency	From	To	Tenure
Member of Parliament, Rajya Sabha (1st Term)	BJP	Madhya Pradesh	10 April 1990	9 April 1996	5 years, 365 days
Member of Parliament, Rajya Sabha (2nd Term)	BJP	Madhya Pradesh	10 April 1996	31 October 2000	4 years, 204 days
Member of Parliament, Rajya Sabha (3rd Term)	BJP	Chhattisgarh	1 November 2000	9 April 2002	1 year, 159 days
