= Ramkumar Toppo =

Indian politician

Member of Chhattisgarh Legislative Assembly
- Incumbent
- Assumed office 2023
- Preceded by: Amarjeet Bhagat
- Constituency: Sitapur

Personal details
- Political party: Bharatiya Janata Party
- Profession: Politician

Ramkumar Toppo (born 1992) is an Indian politician from Chhattisgarh. He is a first time MLA from Sitapur Assembly constituency, which is a reserved constituency for Scheduled Tribes community, in Surguja district. He won the 2023 Chhattisgarh Legislative Assembly election, representing the Bharatiya Janata Party.

== Early life and education ==
Ramkumar is from Sitapur, Surguja district, Chhattisgarh. He is the son of Ganesh Ram. He did his B.A. through Open stream at Mats University, Orang, Raipur. He served as a commando in the Central Reserve Police Force's Valley Quick Action Team, and also earned a gallantry medal.

== Career ==
Ramkumar won from Sitapur Assembly constituency representing the Bharatiya Janata Party in the 2023 Chhattisgarh Legislative Assembly election. He polled 83,088 votes and defeated his nearest rival, Amarjeet Bhagat of the Indian National Congress, by a margin of 17,160 votes.

He was involved in a caste certificate controversy after a complaint was lodged against him in October 2023 alleging that he does not belong to ST community. Later, the High Court has directed the Rigarh collector to inquire into the allegations.
