= Devendra Yadav =

Indian politician

Devendra Singh Yadav

Member of Chhattisgarh Legislative Assembly
- Incumbent
- Assumed office 11 December 2018
- Preceded by: Prem Prakash Pandey
- Constituency: Bhilai Nagar

Personal details
- Born: 1990 (age 35–36)
- Party: Indian National Congress

Devendra Singh Yadav (born 1990) is an Indian National Congress politician and member of Chhattisgarh Legislative Assembly since 2018, elected twice from Bhilai Nagar. In the 2023 election, when the Congress faced in rout in urban areas, he was the sole MLA to be re-elected from an urban constituency. He was also a national secretary of the National Students' Union of India and was the youngest mayor of Bhilai, elected at the Bhilai Municipal Corporation in 2016.

== Early life and education ==
Yadav hails from Bhilai Nagar. He did his schooling at Bhilai Nair Samajam, Bhilai. After his school, he went to Bhopal to pursue training as a pilot but came back to Bhilai and entered politics after a call from a student leader of Rungta Engineering College asking students to enter politics.

== Career ==
Yadav began his political journey as the president of the district unit National Students Union of India, the student wing of the Indian National Congress party. He went on to become the Chhattisgarh state president and the National secretary of NSUI in 2016. In 2016, he also became the mayor of Bhilai Municipal Corporation, one of the youngest leaders to get elected to the post. In 2018, he was elected as MLA for the first time from Bhilai Nagar and he was re-elected in 2023.
