= Durg City Assembly constituency =

Legislative Assembly constituency in Chhattisgarh State, India

Coordinates: 21.19°N 81.28°E

Durg City
- Constituency No. 64 for the Chhattisgarh Legislative Assembly

Constituency details
- Country: India
- Region: Central India
- State: Chhattisgarh
- District: Durg
- Lok Sabha constituency: Durg
- Established: 2008
- Total electors: 227,843
- Reservation: None

Member of Legislative Assembly
- 6th Chhattisgarh Legislative Assembly
- Incumbent Gajendra Yadav
- Party: Bharatiya Janata Party
- Elected year: 2023
- Preceded by: Arun Vora

Durg City is one of the 90 Legislative Assembly constituencies of Chhattisgarh state in India. It comprises areas covered by the Durg Municipal Corporation, in Durg district.

== Members of Legislative Assembly ==
Year	Member	Party
Before 2008: Constituency did not exist
2008	Hemchand Yadav	Bharatiya Janata Party
2013	Arun Vora	Indian National Congress
2018	Arun Vora	Indian National Congress
2023	Gajendra Yadav	Bharatiya Janata Party

== Election results ==
=== 2023 ===
2023 Chhattisgarh Legislative Assembly election: Durg City
Party	Candidate	Votes	%	±%
BJP	Gajendra Yadav	97,906	63.89	+32.36
INC	Arun Vora	49,209	32.11	−14.57
NOTA	None of the Above	933	0.61	−0.45
Majority		48,697	31.78	+16.63
Turnout		153,236	67.26	−1.71
BJP gain from INC		Swing		

=== 2018 ===
Chhattisgarh Legislative Assembly Election, 2018: Durg City
Party	Candidate	Votes	%	±%
INC	Arun Vora	64,981	46.68	
BJP	Chandrika Chandrakar	43,900	31.53	
JCC	Pratap Madhyani	20,634	14.82	
Independent	Kanchan Shendre	1,733	1.24	
AAP	K. S. Agrawal	1,701	1.22	
NOTA	None of the Above	1,471	1.06	
Majority		21,081	15.15	
Turnout		139,213	68.97	
INC hold		Swing		

== See also ==
- List of constituencies of the Chhattisgarh Legislative Assembly
- Durg district
- Durg
