= Ram Sewak Paikra =

Indian politician (born 1962)

Minister of Home Affairs Government of Chhattisgarh
- In office 18 December 2013 – 11 December 2018
- Chief Minister: Raman Singh
- Preceded by: Nanki Ram Kanwar
- Succeeded by: Tamradhwaj Sahu

President of Bharatiya Janata Party, Chhattisgarh
- In office 11 May 2010 – 21 January 2014
- Preceded by: Vishnudeo Sai
- Succeeded by: Dharamlal Kaushik

Member of Chhattisgarh Legislative Assembly
- In office 2013–2018
- Preceded by: Prem Sai Singh Tekam
- Succeeded by: Prem Sai Singh Tekam
- Constituency: Pratappur
- In office 2003–2008
- Preceded by: Prem Sai Singh Tekam
- Succeeded by: Prem Sai Singh Tekam
- Constituency: Pilkha

Personal details
- Born: 7 February 1962 (age 64) Chendra, Madhya Pradesh, India (now in Chhattisgarh, India)
- Party: Bharatiya Janata Party
- Other political affiliations: Bharatiya Jana Sangh (Before 1977)
- Spouse: Shashikala Paikra
- Children: 2 Sons & 3 Daughters

Ram Sewak Paikra (born 7 February 1962) is an Indian politician and former Home Minister of Chhattisgarh. He is a senior BJP leader. He was the Member of Chhattisgarh Legislative Assembly from Pratappur constituency of Chhattisgarh

== Political career ==
Paikra was first elected to Chhattisgarh Legislative Assembly in 2003 by defeating senior Congress leader Premsai Singh. Before this he unsuccessfully contested Madhya Pradesh Assembly election twice, in 1993 and 1998. He contested the 2008 Chhattisgarh Assembly election but lost by a margin of 2,373 votes but in 2013 Assembly election, he won by a margin of 8,143 votes and became Home minister in Raman Singh's cabinet.

In 2014, amid growing concern about rape of women and girls in India, Paikra said, "Such incidents [rapes] do not happen deliberately. These kind of incidents happen accidentally."

In 2018 Assembly election, he was defeated by Prem Sai Singh Tekam of the Indian National Congress.
