= Lalit Chandrakar =

Indian politician (born 1974)

Lalit Chandrakar (born 1974) is an Indian politician from Chhattisgarh. He is an MLA from Durg Gramin Assembly constituency in Durg District. He won the 2023 Chhattisgarh Legislative Assembly election, representing the Bharatiya Janata Party.

== Early life and education ==
Chandrakar is from Kolihapuri, Durg District, Chhattisgarh. His late father, Arjun Singh Chandrakar, was a farmer. He completed his graduation in commerce in 2003 at a college affiliated with Pandit Ravishankar Shukla University.

== Career ==
Chandrakar won from Durg Gramin Assembly constituency representing the Bharatiya Janata Party in the 2023 Chhattisgarh Legislative Assembly election. He polled 87,175 votes and defeated his nearest rival, Tamradhwaj Sahu of the Indian National Congress, by a margin of 16,642 votes.
