= Prem Prakash Pandey =

Indian politician

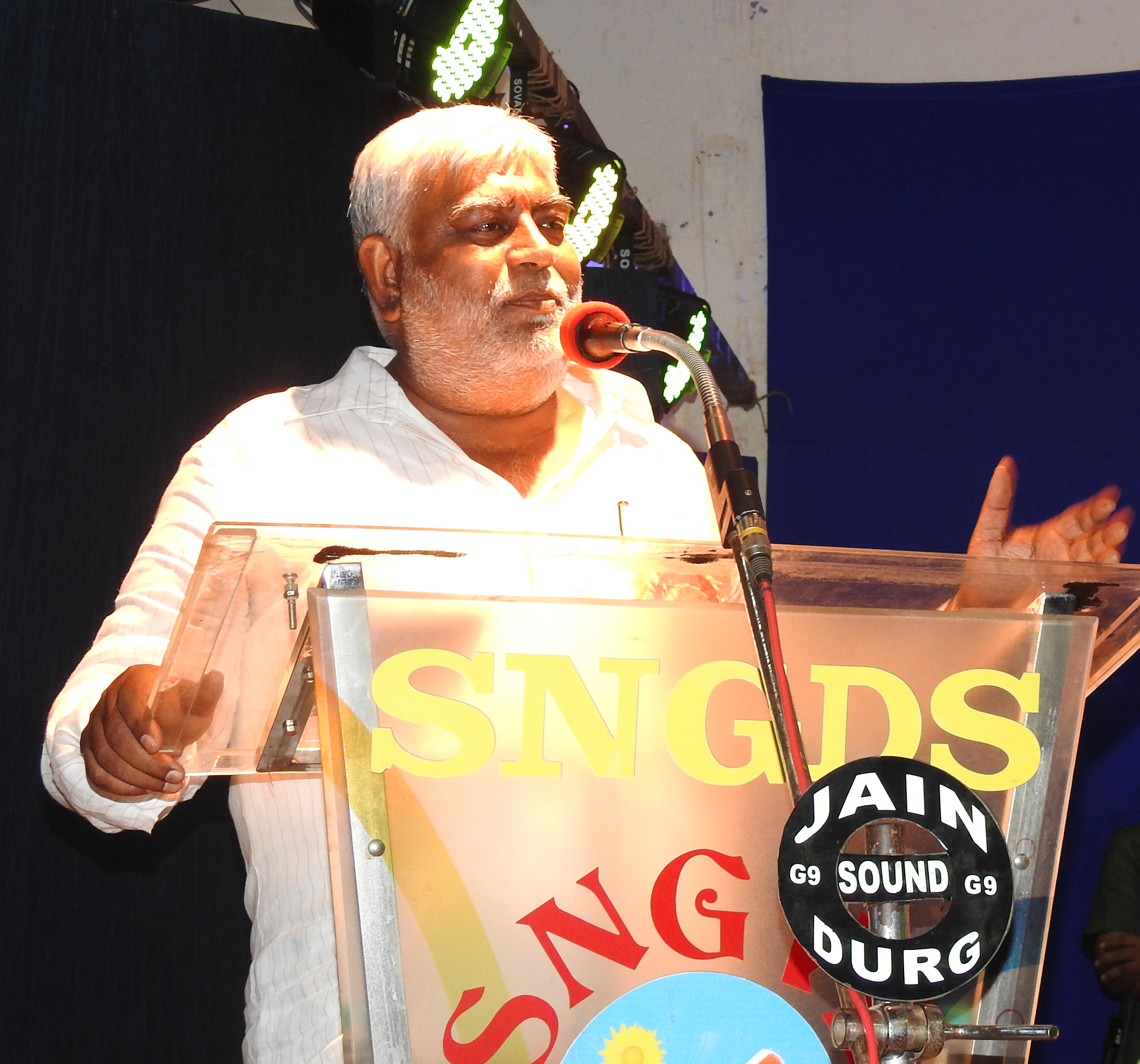

Minister of Revenue, Disaster Management and Rehabilitation, Government of Chhattisgarh
- In office 9 December 2013 – 11 December 2018
- Chief Minister: Raman Singh
- Preceded by: Amar Agrawal
- Succeeded by: Jai Singh Agrawal

Minister of Higher and Technical Education, Government of Chhattisgarh
- In office 9 December 2013 – 11 December 2018
- Chief Minister: Raman Singh
- Preceded by: Hemchand Yadav
- Succeeded by: Umesh Nandkumar Patel

2nd Speaker of the Chhattisgarh Legislative Assembly
- In office 22 December 2003 – 5 January 2009
- Preceded by: Rajendra Prasad Shukla
- Succeeded by: Dharamlal Kaushik

Member of the Chhattisgarh Legislative Assembly for Bhilai Nagar
- In office 9 December 2013 – 11 December 2018
- Preceded by: Badruddin Qureshi
- Succeeded by: Devendra Singh Yadav Bhilai
- In office 7 December 2003 – 7 December 2008
- Preceded by: Badruddin Qureshi
- Succeeded by: Badruddin Qureshi

Member of Madhya Pradesh Legislative Assembly for Bhilai
- In office 1990–1998
- Preceded by: Ravi Arya
- Succeeded by: Badruddin Qureshi

Personal details
- Born: 8 March 1958 (age 68) Bhurwar, Uttar Pradesh, India
- Party: Bharatiya Janata Party
- Spouse: Krishnavati Pandey
- Children: 3
- Website: premprakashpandey.in

Prem Prakash Pandey (born 8 March 1958) is an Indian politician who is a member of the Bharatiya Janata Party. He served as the second Speaker of the Chhattisgarh Legislative Assembly and as a Cabinet Minister in the government of Raman Singh. He was also a minister in the government of undivided Madhya Pradesh. He was involved in the political and administrative developments surrounding the formation of Chhattisgarh in 2000 following its separation from Madhya Pradesh.

== Early life ==
Prem Prakash Pandey was born on 8 March 1958 in Bhurwar, Bankata, Deoria district, Uttar Pradesh, India. His father was employed at the Bhilai Steel Plant, and his mother was a homemaker. Biographical sources state that political developments during his early years, including the rise of the Naxalite movement, influenced his later involvement in public life.

== Political life ==
Prem Prakash Pandey entered politics in 1976 while studying at Pandit Ravishankar Shukla University. As a student, he joined the Akhil Bharatiya Vidyarthi Parishad (ABVP). He later entered electoral politics and, according to the source, won his first election in 1990.

In 1993, Pandey was elected to the Legislative Assembly. In 1995, he became an executive member of the BJP Yuva Morcha. On 22 December 2003, he was elected Speaker of the Chhattisgarh Legislative Assembly.
