= Pratappur, Chhattisgarh Assembly constituency =

Legislative Assembly constituency in Chhattisgarh State, India

Coordinates: 23.49°N 83.2°E

Pratappur
- Constituency No. 6 for the Chhattisgarh Legislative Assembly

Constituency details
- Country: India
- Region: Central India
- State: Chhattisgarh
- District: Surajpur
- Lok Sabha constituency: Surguja
- Established: 2008
- Total electors: 231,709
- Reservation: ST

Member of Legislative Assembly
- 6th Chhattisgarh Legislative Assembly
- Incumbent Shakuntala Singh Porthe
- Party: Bharatiya Janata Party
- Elected year: 2023
- Preceded by: Premsai Singh Tekam

Pratappur is one of the 90 Legislative Assembly constituencies of Chhattisgarh state in India.

It is part of Surajpur district and is reserved for candidates belonging to the Scheduled Tribes. As of 2023, it is represented by Shakuntala Singh Portey of the Bharatiya Janata Party.

== Members of the Legislative Assembly ==
Year	Member	Party
Until 2008: Constituency did not exist
2008	Prem Sai Singh Tekam	Indian National Congress
2013	Ram Sewak Paikra	Bharatiya Janata Party
2018	Prem Sai Singh Tekam	Indian National Congress
2023	Shakuntala Singh Portey	Bharatiya Janata Party

== Election results ==
=== 2023 ===
2023 Chhattisgarh Legislative Assembly election: Pratappur
Party	Candidate	Votes	%	±%
BJP	Shakuntala Singh Portey	83,796	43.59	+17.19
INC	Rajkumari Shivbhajan Marabi	72,088	37.50	−14.20
GGP	Jagmohan Singh	17,041	8.86	−1.08
AAP	Narendra Sahu	4,870	2.53	
NOTA	None of the Above	4,351	2.26	−1.03
Majority		11,708	6.09	−19.20
Turnout		192,242	82.97	−0.95
Registered electors		231,709		
BJP gain from INC		Swing		

=== 2018 ===
Chhattisgarh Legislative Assembly Election, 2018: Pratappur
Party	Candidate	Votes	%	±%
INC	Prem Sai Singh Tekam	90,148	51.70	
BJP	Ramsewak Paikra	46,043	26.40	
GGP	Asha Devi Poya	17,341	9.94	
NOTA	None of the Above	5,741	3.29	
Majority		44,105	25.29	
Turnout		1,74,379	83.92	
INC gain from BJP		Swing		

== See also ==
- List of constituencies of the Chhattisgarh Legislative Assembly
- Surajpur district
