= Amarjeet Bhagat =

Indian politician

Cabinet Minister for Culture, Planning, Economics & Statistics and Food & Civil supplies, Consumer protection, Government of Chhattisgarh
- In office 2018–2023
- Chief Minister: Bhupesh Baghel
- Preceded by: Punnulal Mohle
- Succeeded by: Dayaldas Baghel

Member of Chhattisgarh Legislative Assembly
- In office 2003–2023
- Preceded by: Gopal Ram
- Succeeded by: Ramkumar Toppo
- Constituency: Sitapur

Personal details
- Born: 22 June 1968 (age 57)
- Party: Indian National Congress
- As of September, 2023

Amarjeet Bhagat (born 22 June 1968) is an Indian politician from the state of Chhattisgarh, India and a member of Indian National Congress. He was elected to Chhattisgarh Legislative Assembly from Sitapur constituency. He previously served as a cabinet minister in Government of Chhattisgarh.
