= Vijay Baghel =

Member of the Lok Sabha

Member of Parliament, Lok Sabha
- Incumbent
- Assumed office 23 May 2019
- Preceded by: Tamradhwaj Sahu
- Constituency: Durg

Member of the Chhattisgarh Legislative Assembly
- In office 8 December 2008 – 8 December 2013
- Preceded by: Bhupesh Baghel
- Succeeded by: Bhupesh Baghel
- Constituency: Patan

Personal details
- Born: Vijay Baghel; 15 August 1959 (age 67) Urla, Durg, Madhya Pradesh, India (now in Chhattisgarh, India)
- Party: Bharatiya Janata Party
- Spouse: Rajani Baghel
- Children: Saurabh (son) & Pratiksha (daughter)
- Parent: Nammulal Baghel (Father) Satyabhama Baghel (Mother)
- Profession: Politician, Agriculture

Vijay Baghel (born 15 August 1959) is an Indian politician who serves as the Member of Parliament, Lok Sabha from Durg as a member of the Bharatiya Janata Party.

== Education ==
Vijay Baghel holds a post graduate degree in Sociology from Pandit Ravishanker University, Raipur.

== Political career ==
Baghel was first elected to Bhilai Municipal Council in 2000 as an Independent candidate. He contested 2003 Assembly election from Patan constituency as a candidate Nationalist Congress Party but lost to Bhupesh Baghel. Again, he contested 2008 Assembly election as a BJP candidate and won. He defeating Bhupesh Baghel of Congress by a margin of 7,842 votes and became Parliamentary Secretary to Home Minister Nanki Ram Kanwar. Again, Baghel contested 2013 Assembly election against Bhupesh Baghel but failed to retain the seat. In the 2019 general election, he contested against Pratima Chandrakar of Indian National Congress from Durg and won by margin of 3,91,978 votes. In the 2024 general election, he contested against Rajendra Sahu of Indian National Congress from Durg and won by margin of 4,38,226 votes.

Lok Sabha
Preceded by Tamradhwaj Sahu	Member of Parliament for Durg; 2019 – Present	Incumbent
