= Durg Gramin Assembly constituency =

Legislative Assembly constituency in Chhattisgarh, India

Coordinates: 21.138°N 81.266°E

Durg Gramin
- Constituency No. 63 for the Chhattisgarh Legislative Assembly

Constituency details
- Country: India
- Region: Central India
- State: Chhattisgarh
- District: Durg
- Lok Sabha constituency: Durg
- Established: 2003
- Reservation: None

Member of Legislative Assembly
- 6th Chhattisgarh Legislative Assembly
- Incumbent Lalit Chandrakar
- Party: Bharatiya Janata Party
- Elected year: 2023

Durg Gramin Vidhan Sabha constituency is one of the 90 Vidhan Sabha (Legislative Assembly) constituencies of Chhattisgarh state in central India.

It is part of Durg district.

== Members of Legislative Assembly ==
Year	Member	Party
2008	Pratima Chandrakar	Indian National Congress
2013	Ramshila Sahu	Bharatiya Janata Party
2018	Tamradhwaj Sahu	Indian National Congress
2023	Lalit Chandrakar	Bharatiya Janata Party

== Election results ==
=== 2023 ===
2023 Chhattisgarh Legislative Assembly election: Durg Gramin
Party	Candidate	Votes	%	±%
BJP	Lalit Chandrakar	87,175	52.52	▲19.44
INC	Tamradhwaj Sahu	70,533	42.5	▼8.84
AAP	Sanjeet Vishwakarma	1,520	0.92	New
BSP	Ishwar Kumar Nishad	1,490	0.9	New
NOTA	None of the Above	1,137	0.69	▼1.06
Majority		16,642	10.02	▼8.24
Turnout		1,65,976		
BJP gain from INC		Swing		

=== 2018 ===
2018 Chhattisgarh Legislative Assembly election: Durg Gramin
Party	Candidate	Votes	%	±%
INC	Tamradhwaj Sahu	76,208	51.34	
BJP	Jagdeshwar Sahu	49,096	33.08	
JCC	Balmukund Dewangan	11,485	7.74	
Independent	Chumman Lal Deshmukh	2,819	1.9	
NOTA	None of the Above	2,603	1.75	
Majority		27,112	18.26	
Turnout		1,48,425	74,47	
INC gain from BJP		Swing		

== See also ==
- Durg district
