= Hemchand Yadav =

Indian politician

Minister of Higher & Technical education, Science & Technology, Government of Chhattisgarh
- In office 8 December 2008 – 8 December 2013
- Preceded by: Ajay Chandrakar
- Succeeded by: Prem Prakash Pandey

Minister of Water Resources, Government of Chhattisgarh
- In office 7 December 2003 – 8 December 2013
- Preceded by: Dhanesh Patila
- Succeeded by: Brijmohan Agrawal

Minister of Transport, Government of Chhattisgarh
- In office 6 July 2004 – 8 December 2008
- Succeeded by: Rajesh Munat

Minister of Food, Civil Supply, Government of Chhattisgarh
- In office 6 July 2004 – 18 June 2005

Minister of Sports and Youth welfare, Government of Chhattisgarh
- In office 7 December 2003 – 18 June 2005

Member of Chhattisgarh Legislative Assembly
- In office 2000–2013
- Succeeded by: Arun Vora
- Constituency: Durg City

Member of Madhya Pradesh Legislative Assembly
- In office 1998–2000
- Preceded by: Arun Vora
- Constituency: Durg

Personal details
- Born: 1 December 1958 Baigapara, Durg, Madhya Pradesh, India (now in Chhattisgarh, India)
- Died: 11 April 2018 (aged 59) Delhi, India
- Party: Bharatiya Janata Party
- Spouse: Leela Yadav
- Children: 4

Hemchand Yadav (1 December 1958 - 11 April 2018) was an Indian politician and a member of Bharatiya Janata Party. He was cabinet minister in Government of Chhattisgarh from 2003 to 2013.

== Early life ==
Yadav was born to small farmer Ramlal Yadav in Durg. He married Leela Yadav on 9 March 1976 and they have four children, two sons and two daughter. In 1987, he became active in politics.

== Political career ==
Yadav was first elected to Madhya Pradesh Legislative Assembly in 1998 from Durg Constituency by defeating his congress rival Arun Vora by a margin of 3,279. After creation of Chhattisgarh Legislative Assembly, he contested 2003 assembly election and won by a huge of 22,573 and became Cabinet minister water resources, sports and youth welfare in Raman Singh's Cabinet. He held various portfolios such as Water resources, Sports and Youth welfare, Transport, Food, Civil Supply, Higher & Technical education till 2013. Hemchand Yadav Vishwavidyalaya is named after him.

== See also ==
Hemchand Yadav Vishwavidyalaya, Durg
