= JCP =

JCP may refer to:

== Businesses ==
- JCPenney, an American department store chain (founded 1902)
- Jim Crockett Promotions, an American wrestling company (founded 1931)

== Government and politics ==
- Jobcentre Plus, United Kingdom (formed 2002)
- Joint Combat Pistol, an American arms program (2005–2006)
- Japanese Communist Party (founded 1922)
- Jordanian Communist Party (founded 1948)
- Judicial corporal punishment
- Justice and Construction Party, Libya (founded 2012)
- Portuguese Communist Youth (Juventude Comunista Portuguesa; founded 1979)

== Periodicals ==
- Journal of Chemical Physics (from 1933)
- Journal of Computational Physics (from 1966)
- Journal of Consumer Psychology (from 1992)

== Places ==
- Jenny Craig Pavilion, a University of San Diego arena, California, US (opened 2000)
- Jones College Prep High School, Chicago, Illinois, US (opened 1938)

== Other uses ==
- Java Community Process, for programming standards
