= Ishwar Sahu =

Indian politician (born 1981)

Member of the Chhattisgarh Legislative Assembly
- Incumbent
- Assumed office 3 December 2023
- Preceded by: Ravindra Choubey
- Constituency: Saja

Personal details
- Born: 1981 (age 44–45)
- Party: Bharatiya Janata Party

Ishwar Sahu (born 1981) is an Indian politician, rickshaw puller and laborer who is serving as member of Chhattisgarh Legislative Assembly elected from Saja Assembly constituency. He is a member of the Bharatiya Janata Party, Chhattisgarh. Sahu defeated 7 times winning Congress MLA Ravindra Choubey.

== Education ==
Sahu is educated till Class 5.

== Personal life ==
Sahu’s son was murdered in mob lynching.It resulted in a riot in biranpur village, which killed another two.
