= Nand Kumar Patel =

Indian politician

MLA, Chhattisgarh
- In office 1990 – 25 May 2013
- Preceded by: Arjun Singh
- Succeeded by: Umesh Nandkumar Patel
- Constituency: Kharsia

President, Chhattisgarh Pradesh Congress Committee
- In office April 2011 – 25 May 2013
- Preceded by: Dhanendra Sahu
- Succeeded by: Bhupesh Baghel

First Home Minister of Chhattisgarh
- In office November 2000 – December 2003
- Succeeded by: Brijmohan Agarawal

Personal details
- Born: 8 November 1953 Nandeli, Chhattisgarh, India
- Died: 25 May 2013 (aged 59) Sukma, Chhattisgarh, India
- Party: Indian National Congress
- Spouse: Neela Nandkumar Patel
- Children: Dinesh Nandkumar Patel, Umesh Nandkumar Patel

Nand Kumar Patel (8 November 1953 – 25 May 2013) was an Indian National Congress politician from the province of Chhattisgarh. He was elected to the Kharsia Assembly Constituency five times in a row (1990, 1993, 1998, 2003 and 2008).

He was a cabinet minister in the state governments of Madhya Pradesh and Chhattisgarh. He was kidnapped and killed by Naxalites during the 2013 Naxal attack in Darbha valley.

On 25 May 2013, news broke that several Congress leaders had been killed in a Naxalite attack on a Congress convoy. At first, Naxalites claimed to have kidnapped Nand Kumar Patel and his son Dinesh, offering hope that they might come back alive. However, their bullet-ridden bodies were found in the Jiram valley of Bastar district the next day.

On 27 May, the Naxalites claimed responsibility for the attack by issuing a statement which called it a punishment for atrocities committed by the Salwa Judum, the counter-Naxalite paramilitary forces in the Bastar area, and claimed the attack was targeted at its leader, Mahendra Karma, who was also killed in the 25 May attack.

The newly elected Chhattisgarh government has set up an SIT under Vivekanand Sinha to probe into the incident on 2 January 2019.

Shaheed Nandkumar Patel Vishwavidyalaya is an Indian state university in Raigarh, Chhattisgarh. It was established by the Gazette notification on 22 January 2020 of the Chhattisgarh Act, The Chhattisgarh Vishwavidyalaya Act, 2019, and opened in January 2020. Under this Indian State University, there are total of 29 government colleges and 80 private colleges established and has been working full-fledged.

== See also ==
- Vidya Charan Shukla

Preceded by Harvansh Singh	Home Minister of Madhya Pradesh; December 1998 to October 2000	Succeeded by Mahendra Baudh

Preceded by Post created	First Home Minister of Chhattisgarh; November 2000 to December 2003	Succeeded by Brijmohan Agrawal
