= Umesh Nandkumar Patel =

Indian politician

Umesh Nandkumar Patel (POLITICIAN)

Minister of Higher Education, Government of Chhattisgarh
- In office 25 December 2018 – 3 December 2023
- Preceded by: Prem Prakash Pandey
- Constituency: Kharsia

Member of Legislative Assembly Chhattisgarh
- Incumbent
- Assumed office 8 December 2013
- Preceded by: Nandkumar Patel
- Constituency: Kharsia

President Chhattisgarh Youth Congress
- In office 10 September 2016 – 30 May 2019
- Succeeded by: Purnachand Padhee

Personal details
- Born: Umesh Patel; 26 November 1983 (age 42) Raigarh, Madhya Pradesh (now in Chhattisgarh), India
- Party: Indian National Congress
- Spouse: Sudha Patel
- Children: 1
- Parent: Nand Kumar Patel (father)
- Education: Bhilai Institute of Technology
- Occupation: Politician
- Website: Official Website

Umesh Nandkumar Patel (born 26 November 1983) is an Indian politician, from Chhattisgarh. He is a member of the Indian National Congress and has been the president of the Chhattisgarh Youth Congress Committee since 10 September 2016. He represents the Kharsia constituency in the Chhattisgarh Legislative Assembly.

He was the minister of Higher Education of Chhattisgarh till 2023 and Skill development, Science and Techonogy, Sports and Youth Development. Also, he won assembly election in year 2023 from Kharsia constituency

== Early life ==
Patel was born to politician Nand Kumar Patel and Smt. Neela Nandkumar Patel on 26 November 1983 in a politicians family who lived in Nandeli, a village in Raigarh district of Madhya Pradesh (present-day Chhattisgarh). His father late. Nand Kumar Patel was a political leader in Kharsia Constituency. He graduated in Information Technology and became an engineer.

Due to sudden demise of his father and elder brother, he had to leave his educational interests and join politics. In the year 2013, he was appointed as the Member of Legislative Assembly in Kharsia Constituency of Chhattisgarh. He also became the first youth leader of Indian National Congress from chhattisgarh and is maintaining his position after defeating O.P Choudhary (ex IAS Officer) from Bhartiya Janta Party, Kharsia.

== Educational background ==
Patel completed his schooling from Government Primary School, Nandeli, Raigarh, Madhya Pradesh (present-day Chhattisgarh). He pursued his higher secondary from Bhopal, Madhya Pradesh. He completed his graduation in the year 2005 from B.I.T Durg. He had also worked as an IT Professional in Capgemini Hyderabad & HSBC America during the years 2006–2013.
