= Sitapur, Chhattisgarh Assembly constituency =

Legislative Assembly constituency in Chhattisgarh State, India

Coordinates: 22.78°N 83.5°E

Sitapur
- Constituency No. 11 for the Chhattisgarh Legislative Assembly

Constituency details
- Country: India
- Region: Central India
- State: Chhattisgarh
- District: Surguja
- Lok Sabha constituency: Surguja
- Established: 1951
- Total electors: 201,660
- Reservation: ST

Member of Legislative Assembly
- 6th Chhattisgarh Legislative Assembly
- Incumbent Ram Kumar Toppo
- Party: Bharatiya Janata Party
- Elected year: 2023
- Preceded by: Amarjeet Bhagat

Sitapur is one of the 90 Legislative Assembly constituencies of Chhattisgarh state in India. It is in Surguja district and is reserved for candidates belonging to the Scheduled Tribes.

== Members of Legislative Assembly ==
Year	Member	Party
Madhya Pradesh Legislative Assembly
1952	Chakrapani Shukla	Indian National Congress
1957	Haribhajan Singh	Indian National Congress
1962	Mokshmadan Singh	Indian National Congress
1967	Mokshmadan Singh	Indian National Congress
1972	Sukhi Ram	Indian National Congress
1977	Sukhi Ram	Indian National Congress
1980	Sukhi Ram	Indian National Congress
1985	Sukhi Ram	Indian National Congress
1990	Ram Khelawan	Independent
1993	Sukhdev Ram	Indian National Congress
1998	Gopal Ram	Independent
Chhattisgarh Legislative Assembly
2003	Amarjeet Bhagat	Indian National Congress
2008	Amarjeet Bhagat	Indian National Congress
2013	Amarjeet Bhagat	Indian National Congress
2018	Amarjeet Bhagat	Indian National Congress
2023	Ramkumar Toppo	Bharatiya Janata Party

== Election results ==
=== 2023 ===
Chhattisgarh Legislative Assembly Election, 2023: Sitapur
Party	Candidate	Votes	%	±%
BJP	Ramkumar Toppo	83,088	50.36	+17.38
INC	Amarjeet Bhagat	65,928	39.96	−16.60
Independent	Santosh Kumar Khess	3,264	1.98	
NOTA	None of the Above	1,414	0.86	−2.53
Majority		17,160	10.40	−13.18
Turnout		164,980	81.81	+0.51
BJP gain from INC		Swing		

=== 2018 ===
Chhattisgarh Legislative Assembly Election, 2018: Sitapur
Party	Candidate	Votes	%	±%
INC	Amarjeet Bhagat	86,670	56.56	
BJP	Gopal Ram	50,533	32.98	
JCC	Setram Bara	2,495	1.63	
Independent	Shanti Prakash	1,938	1.26	
AAP	Ashok Tirkey	1680	1.10	
Independent	Munna Toppo	1,629	1.06	
NOTA	None of the Above	5,189	3.39	
Majority		36,137	23.58	
Turnout		1,53,223	81.30	
INC hold		Swing		

== See also ==
- List of constituencies of the Chhattisgarh Legislative Assembly
- Surguja district
- Sitapur
