= Patan, Chhattisgarh Assembly constituency =

Legislative Assembly constituency in Chhattisgarh State, India

Coordinates: 21.04°N 81.54°E

Patan
- Constituency No. 62 for the Chhattisgarh Legislative Assembly

Constituency details
- Country: India
- Region: Central India
- State: Chhattisgarh
- District: Durg
- Lok Sabha constituency: Durg
- Established: 2003
- Total electors: 217,319
- Reservation: None

Member of Legislative Assembly
- 6th Chhattisgarh Legislative Assembly
- Incumbent Bhupesh Baghel
- Party: Indian National Congress
- Elected year: 2023

Patan is one of the 90 Legislative Assembly constituencies of Chhattisgarh state in India. It is in Durg district.

Bhupesh Baghel, the former Chief Minister of Chhattisgarh, is the current MLA of this constituency. The constituency is a stronghold of Indian National Congress Party.

== Members of Legislative Assembly ==
Year	Member	Party
2003	Bhupesh Baghel	Indian National Congress
2008	Vijay Baghel	Bharatiya Janata Party
2013	Bhupesh Baghel	Indian National Congress
2018	Bhupesh Baghel	Indian National Congress
2023	Bhupesh Baghel	Indian National Congress

== Election results ==
=== 2023 ===
2023 Chhattisgarh Legislative Assembly election: Patan
Party	Candidate	Votes	%	±%
INC	Bhupesh Baghel	95,438	51.91	▲0.06
BJP	Vijay Baghel	75,715	41.18	▲6.93
JCC	Amit Ajit Jogi	4,822	2.62	▼5.5
NOTA	None of the above	641	0.35	▼2.07
Majority		19,723	10.73	▼6.14
Turnout		2,16,917	84.27	▲1.02
INC hold		Swing		

=== 2018 ===
Chhattisgarh Legislative Assembly Election, 2018: Patan
Party	Candidate	Votes	%	±%
INC	Bhupesh Baghel	84,352	51.85	
BJP	Motilal Sahu	56,875	34.98	
JCC	Shakuntala Sahu	13,201	8.12	
NOTA	None of the above	3,939	2.42	
Majority		27,477	16.87	
Turnout		1,62,802	83.26	
INC hold		Swing		

== See also ==
- List of constituencies of the Chhattisgarh Legislative Assembly
- Durg district
- Durg
