= Arun Vora =

Indian politician (born 1960)

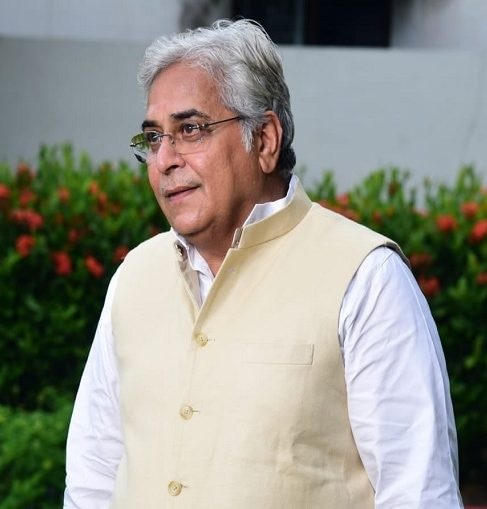

Member of Chhattisgarh Legislative Assembly
- In office 11 December 2018 – 3 December 2023
- Preceded by: Hemchand Yadav
- Succeeded by: Gajendra Yadav
- Constituency: Durg City Assembly constituency

Personal details
- Born: November 22, 1960 (age 65) Rajnandgaon, India
- Party: Indian National Congress
- Spouse: Manju Vora
- Parent: Motilal Vora Shanti Devi Vora

Arun Vora is an Indian politician and member of the Indian National Congress. Arun Vora has been popular leader in the Durg City constituency Assembly from where he has been MLA three times.

Arun Vora belongs to a family of journalists and political stalwarts of national stature. Vora is educated with master's degree. His father Motilal Vora was treasurer of All India Congress Committee, ex-chief minister of Madhya Pradesh.

Currently Arun Vora is member of the Chhattisgarh Legislative Assembly from Durg City constituency in Chhattisgarh.
