= Mohan Lal Baklial =

Indian politician

Member of Parliament, Lok Sabha
- In office 1957–1967
- Succeeded by: V Y Tamaskar
- Constituency: Durg

Personal details
- Born: 4 November 1901 Durg, British India (now in Chhattisgarh, India)
- Party: Indian National Congress

Mohan Lal Baklial was an Indian politician. He was elected to the Lok Sabha, lower house of the Parliament of India as a member of the Indian National Congress.
