= Saja Assembly constituency =

Legislative Assembly constituency in Chhattisgarh State, India

Coordinates: 21.67°N 81.31°E

Saja
- Constituency No. 68 for the Chhattisgarh Legislative Assembly

Constituency details
- Country: India
- Region: Central India
- State: Chhattisgarh
- District: Bemetara
- Lok Sabha constituency: Durg
- Established: 1977
- Total electors: 250,817
- Reservation: None

Member of Legislative Assembly
- 6th Chhattisgarh Legislative Assembly
- Incumbent Ishwar Sahu
- Party: Bharatiya Janata Party
- Elected year: 2023
- Preceded by: Ravindra Choubey

Saja is one of the 90 Legislative Assembly constituencies of Chhattisgarh state in India.

It is part of Bemetara district.

== Members of the Legislative Assembly ==
Year	Member	Party
Madhya Pradesh Legislative Assembly
Prior to 1977: Constituency did not exist
1977	Pradeep Kumar Choubey	Janata Party
1980	Kumari Devi Choubey	Indian National Congress
1985	Ravindra Choubey	Indian National Congress
1990	Ravindra Choubey	Indian National Congress
1993	Ravindra Choubey	Indian National Congress
1998	Ravindra Choubey	Indian National Congress
Chhattisgarh Legislative Assembly
2003	Ravindra Choubey	Indian National Congress
2008	Ravindra Choubey	Indian National Congress
2013	Labh Chand Bafna	Bharatiya Janata Party
2018	Ravindra Choubey	Indian National Congress
2023	Ishwar Sahu	Bharatiya Janata Party

== Election results ==
=== 2023 ===
2023 Chhattisgarh Legislative Assembly election: Saja
Party	Candidate	Votes	%	±%
BJP	Ishwar Sahu	101,789	48.55	+13.95
INC	Ravindra Choubey	96,593	46.07	−5.55
Independent	Sunil Kumar	2,874	1.37	
NOTA	None of the Above	3,600	1.72	−1.43
Majority		5,196	2.48	−14.54
Turnout		209,647	83.59	+0.98
BJP gain from INC		Swing		

=== 2018 ===
2018 Chhattisgarh Legislative Assembly election: Saja
Party	Candidate	Votes	%	±%
INC	Ravindra Choubey	95,658	51.62	
BJP	Labhchand Bafna	64,123	34.60	
JCC	Teksingh Chandel	6,206	3.35	New
Independent	Basant Agrawal	5,700	3.08	
Independent	Lochan Sahu	4,274	2.31	
NOTA	None of the Above	5,840	3.15	
Majority		31,535	17.02	
Turnout		185,321	82.61	
INC gain from BJP		Swing		

== See also ==
- List of constituencies of the Chhattisgarh Legislative Assembly
- Bemetara district
