= Prem Sai Singh Tekam =

Indian politician

Minister of School education Minister of minority affairs Minister of Co-operative Government of Chhattisgarh
- In office 2018 – July 2023
- Chief Minister: Bhupesh Baghel
- Preceded by: Kedar Nath Kashyap; * Punnulal Mohle
- Succeeded by: Kedar Nath Kashyap

Member of the Legislative Assembly
- In office 11 December 2018 – 3 December 2023
- Preceded by: Ram Sewak Paikra
- Succeeded by: Shakuntala Singh Porte
- In office 2008–2013
- Preceded by: Constituency established
- Succeeded by: Ram Sewak Paikra
- Constituency: Pratappur

Chairman of Chhattisgarh State Planning Commission
- In office July 2023 – Incumbent

Personal details
- Born: Prem Sai Tekam; 14 September 1954 (age 71) Pratappur, Surajpur district, Chhattisgarh
- Party: Indian National Congress
- Spouse: Rama Singh
- Children: 2

Prem Sai Singh Tekam (born 14 September 1954) is an Indian politician hailing from Chhattisgarh, India. He is presently serves as the Member of the Legislative Assembly from Chhattisgarh's Pratappur assembly constituency, a position he has held since 2018. Tekam is affiliated with the Indian National Congress.

He assumed the responsibilities of the Education Minister of Chhattisgarh in 2018 and continued in that capacity until his resignation in July 2023. He also served as the Minister of Scheduled Castes and Tribal Welfare, Minister of Backward Classes and Minorities Welfare, Minister of School Education, and Minister of Co-operation in the Chhattisgarh state government.

In July 2023, he was appointed as the Chairman of the State Planning Commission and he retained the status of a cabinet minister in Chhattisgarh.

== Education ==
He graduated with a B.A.M.S. degree from Govt Ayurvedic College Raipur (Pt. Ravi Shankar College Raipur) in 1980.

== Career ==
He was elected as a Member of the Legislative Assembly (MLA) for the first time in the year 1980, followed by winning assembly elections in 1985, 1993, 1998, and 2018. In 1993, he was appointed as the minister handling the portfolio of Water Resources and Legal Legislative Affairs Department in Government of Madhya Pradesh. In 1995, he was appointed as the minister of the Forest Department of Madhya Pradesh. He served as the minister of Revenue and Rehabilitation in the MP government from 1999 to 2000. In 2000, he became a cabinet minister, overseeing the portfolios of Agriculture, Cooperation, Animal Husbandry, and Fisheries in the Government of Chhattisgarh.

From 2018 to 2023, he held the position of Education Minister in the Baghel ministry.

== Controversies ==
In September 2022, Prem Sai Singh Tekam made a controversial remark, suggesting that liquor unites people, during a de-addiction campaign program where he was invited to address the audience. While referencing Madhushala, a poem by poet and writer Harivansh Rai Bachchan, he defended alcohol and declared that people should exercise greater self-control. A video of his statement widely circulated on social media and it garnered criticism.
