= Bemetara =

- Town
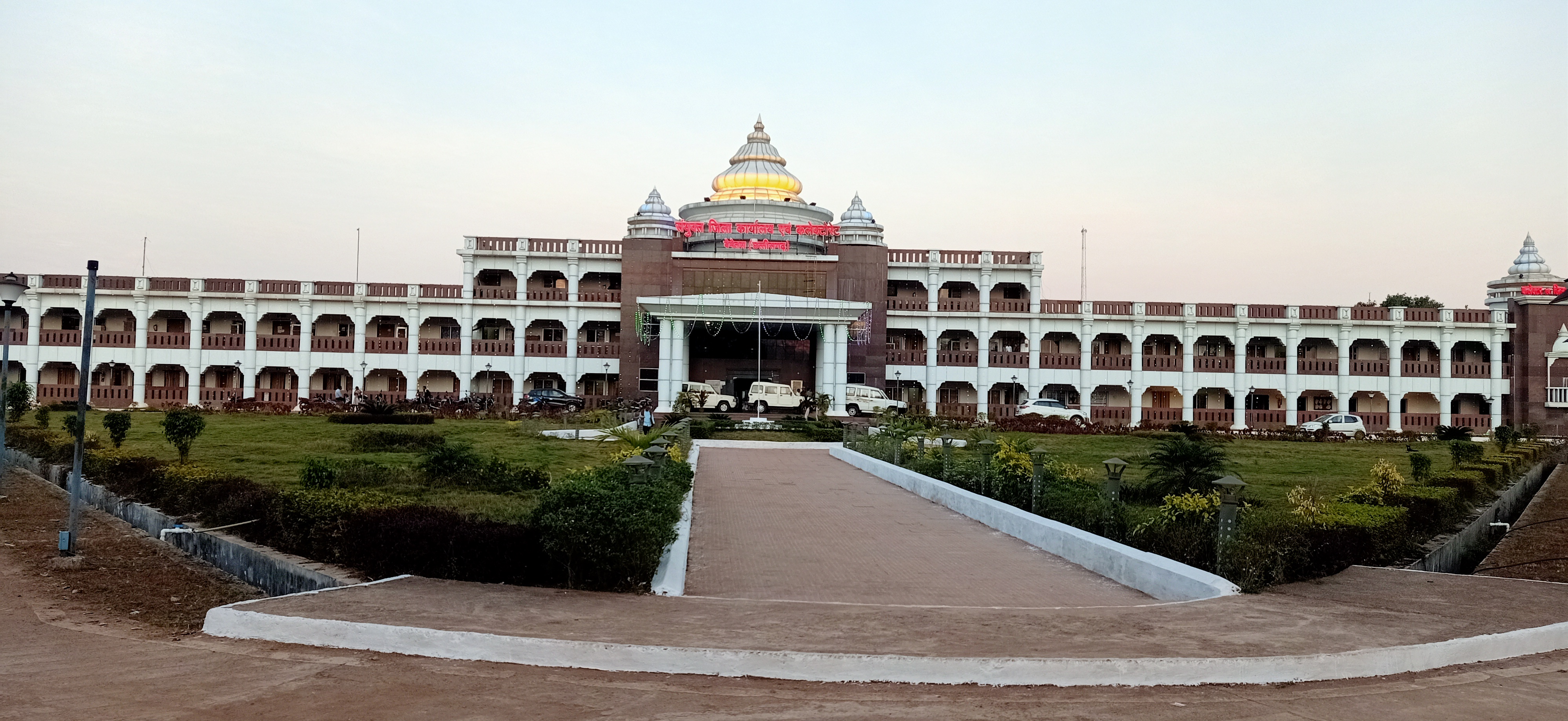
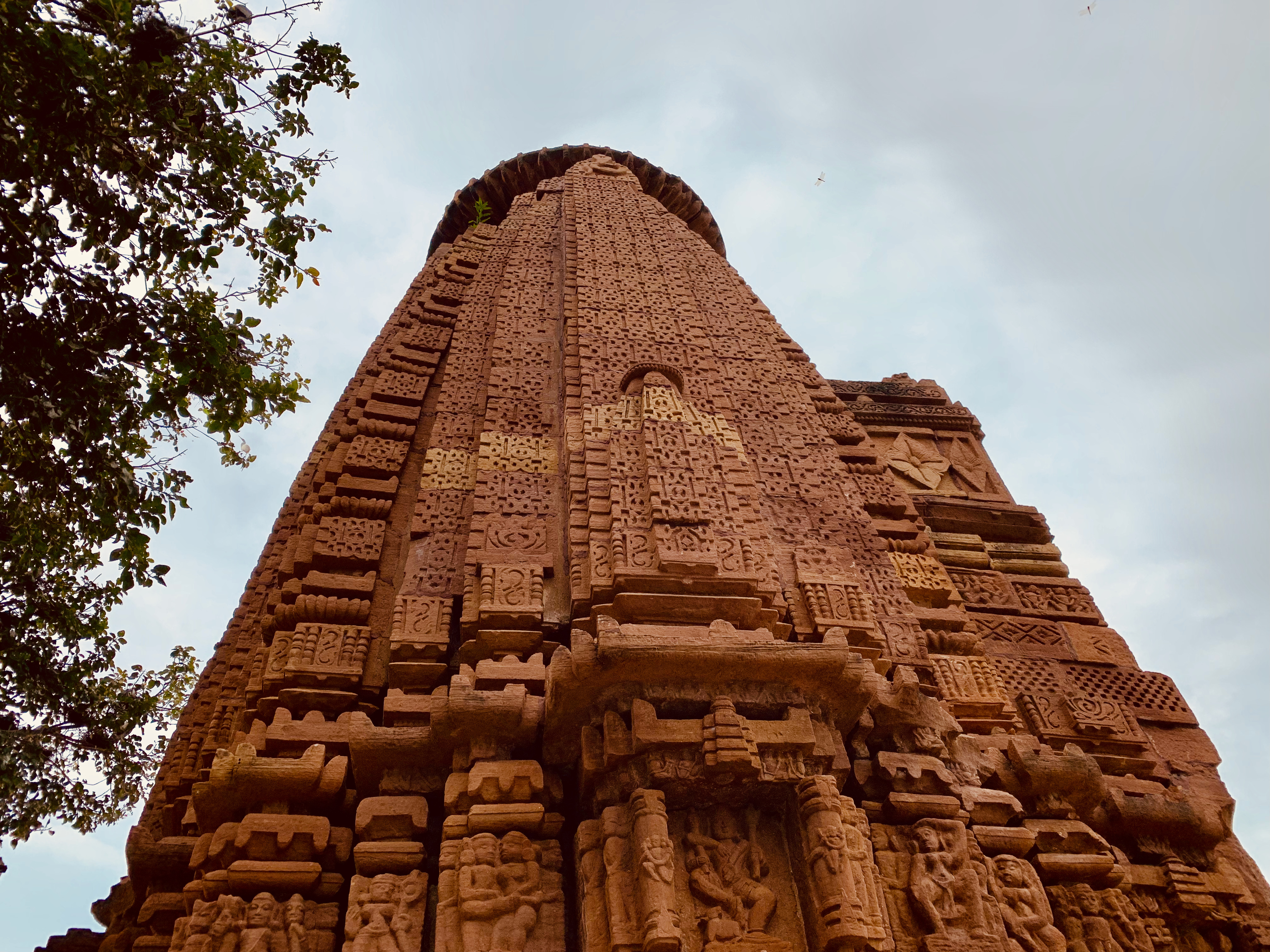
- collector building bemetara, A Hindu old temple
- Nickname: The Friendly City
- Location in Chhattisgarh, India Bemetara (India)
- Coordinates: 21.70°N 81.53°E
- Country: India
- State: Chhattisgarh
- District: Bemetara
- Established: 1 January 2012

Government
  - Type: Municipal council
  - Body: Municipal Council of Bemetara
  - President: Mr"s.Shakuntala Sahu Mr. Vijay Sinha (former President)

Area
  - Total: 11.82 km^{2} (4.56 sq mi)
- Elevation: 278 m (912 ft)

Population (2011)
  - Total: 28,536
  - Density: 2,414/km^{2} (6,253/sq mi)
- Demonym: Bemetarians/Bemetariyas

Languages
  - Official Language: Hindi, Chhattisgarhi
- Time zone: UTC+5:30 (IST)
- PIN: 491335 (Bemetara)
- Telephone code: 07824
- Vehicle registration: CG-25
- Website: www.bemetara.gov.in

Bemetara is a municipality in Bemetara district (formed in 2012 after partition of Durg) of Indian state of Chhattisgarh. The town is an important regional centre for administration, commerce, education, and public services serving the surrounding predominantly agricultural areas.

== Demographics ==
Bemetra is also known as Fauji District. As of the 2011 census Bemetara is a city governed by the Bemetara Municipality, Bemetara district, in the state of Chhattisgarh. The total population in Bemetara city/town is 28,536 as per the survey of census during 2011 by Indian Government.

  - There are 5,800 House Holds in Bemetara.
  - There are 14,280 males (50%);
  - There are 14,256 females (50%).
  - Scheduled Cast are 2,398 (8%)
  - Total Scheduled Tribe are 884 (3%).
  - Literates in the city/town are 20,012 (70%).
  - There are 8,524 total Illiterates (30%).
  - Literates are 20,012 (70%) and total Illiterates 8,524 (30%) in Bemetara.
  - Bemetara Workers are 10,923 (38%). ** 9,718 are regular Workers and 1,205 are Irregular Workers.
  - There are total of 17,613 Non Workers (62%) in Bemetara.

Being an important regional centre and a city with a history stretching back more than a hundreds years, as attracted people from different parts of Madhya Pradesh and neighbouring states. The population includes local ethnic Chhattisgarhis, North Indians, Maharashtrian(migrated during Peshwa reign), South Indians, and a few people from the North East. Local ethnic Chhattisgarhi comprises Kalar, Kurmi, Swarnkar, Teli, Bramhan, Koshta and Satnami communities. The city is also inhabited by the trading communities like Jayaswals, Baniyas, Agarwals, Jains, Gujaratis, and Marwaris. The city is also home to an immigrant population that includes Sindhis and the Sikhs. Majority of the population in Bemetara is Hindu. Muslims primarily reside in such areas as bajar para masjid gali. City is divided by castewise from local people like Bramhan para, Kurmi para, Panjabi para, Sindhi para etc.

== Geography and climate ==
Bemetara

Climate chart (precipitation, max. and min. temperature)
J	F	M	A	M	J	J	A	S	O	N	D
6.7 28 13	12 31 17	25 36 21	16 40 25	19 42 28	190 37 27	381 31 24	345 30 24	230 31 24	54 32 22	7.4 30 17	3.7 27 13
- █ Average max. and min. temperatures in °C
- █ Precipitation totals in mm
- Source: IMD
Imperial conversion
J	F	M	A	M	J	J	A	S	O	N	D
0.3 82 56	0.5 88 62	1 96 69	0.6 103 78	0.7 108 83	7.5 99 80	15 87 75	14 86 75	9.1 88 75	2.1 89 71	0.3 85 62	0.1 81 56
- █ Average max. and min. temperatures in °F
- █ Precipitation totals in inches

=== Geography ===
BEMETARA is located near the centre of a large plain, sometimes referred as the "rice bowl of India", where hundreds of varieties of rice are grown. The Shivnath River flows to the east of the city of bemetara, and the southern side has dense forests. The Maikal Hills rise on the north-west of Bemetara; on the north, the land rises and merges with the Chota Nagpur Plateau, which extends north-east across Jharkhand state. On the south of Bemetara lies the Deccan Plateau.

=== Climate ===
Bemetara has a tropical wet and dry climate, temperatures remain moderate throughout the year, except from March to June, which can be extremely hot. The temperature in April–May sometimes rises above 48 °C (118 °F).These summer months also have dry and hot winds. In summers, the temperature can also go up to 50 °C. The city receives about 1,300 millimetres (51 in) of rain, mostly in the monsoon season from late June to early October. Winters last from November to January and are mild, although lows can fall to 5 °C (41 °F).

Climate data for Bemetara City
Month	Jan	Feb	Mar	Apr	May	Jun	Jul	Aug	Sep	Oct	Nov	Dec	Year
Mean daily maximum °C (°F)	27 (81)	30 (86)	35 (95)	39 (102)	45 (113)	36 (97)	30 (86)	30 (86)	31 (88)	31 (88)	28 (82)	26 (79)	32 (90)
Mean daily minimum °C (°F)	13 (55)	15 (59)	20 (68)	24 (75)	27 (81)	26 (79)	23 (73)	23 (73)	22 (72)	21 (70)	16 (61)	14 (57)	20 (68)
Average precipitation mm (inches)	10 (0.4)	17 (0.7)	14 (0.6)	13 (0.5)	18 (0.7)	239 (9.4)	383 (15.1)	364 (14.3)	197 (7.8)	50 (2.0)	11 (0.4)	16 (0.6)	1,330 (52.4)

== Administration ==
On 1 January 2012, Bemetara became a district Headquarters of Bemetara district. At present Ms. Pratistha Mamgain is Collector of Bemetara and Ms Trilok Bansal is the Superintendent of Police and Mr. Dipesh Sahu is currently MLA of Bemetara. President of municipal council is Vijay Sinha

== Education ==
Bemetara has a network of educational institutions providing primary, secondary and higher education. The town has several government and private schools, including Government Boys Higher Secondary School, Government Girls Higher Secondary School and institutions operating under the Swami Atmanand Government English and Hindi Medium School initiative. School education is provided through institutions affiliated with the Chhattisgarh Board of Secondary Education (CGBSE). The town and its surrounding areas also have schools affiliated with the Central Board of Secondary Education (CBSE), including Academic World School. Higher education in the town is offered by institutions such as Government Pt. Jawaharlal Nehru Arts and Science Postgraduate College, Samadhan College which provides undergraduate and postgraduate education, and Laxman Prasad Baidh Government Girls College, which provides higher education for women. Other educational facilities in the town include the District Institute of Education and Training (DIET), Bemetara, which provides teacher training. The surrounding district also has institutions offering vocational and technical education, including Government Industrial Training Institute (ITI), Bemetara. These institutions serve students from the town and neighbouring rural areas.

== Transportation ==
=== Roads ===
Bemetara city is well connected to Raipur, Jabalpur, Bilaspur, Durg and Kawardha by roadways. NH-12 A passes through the heart of city which is one of the busiest road in the state. This highway connects state capital Raipur to one of the major city of Madhya Pradesh, Jabalpur. There are two state highway passing through Bemetara that are Durg to Bemetara and Kumhari – Bemetara – Mungeli.

=== Railway ===
There is no railway line in Bemetara district and the nearest Railway station is Tilda Neora (37 km) and other stations are Raipur (67.5 km), Durg (74 km) and Bhatapara (59.5 km).
