= Nawagarh =

- Town
- Location in Chhattisgarh, India Nawagarh (India)
- Coordinates: 21°54′25″N 81°36′30″E
- Country: India
- State: Chhattisgarh
- District: Bemetara
- Named for: New Fort

Area
  - Total: 6.42 km^{2} (2.48 sq mi)

Population (2011)
  - Total: 10,541
  - Density: 1,640/km^{2} (4,250/sq mi)

Languages
  - Official: Hindi, Chhattisgarhi
- Time zone: UTC+5:30 (IST)
- Postal code: 491337
- Vehicle registration: CG-25
- Website: nawagarh.in

Nawagarh is a town in Bemetera district (Earlier in Durg) of the Indian state of Chattishgarh.

Presence of historical temples, statue of goddess found under deep soil and pond and a bawadi (Well like structure) said to have been built by king are proofs of its divinity and archeological history.

As of 2011 census of India, it had a population of 10,541, spread over 16.64 km^{2} (6.42 sq mi).
