= Chandulal Chandrakar =

Indian journalist and politician

Chandulal Chandrakar (1 January 1920 – 2 February 1995) was an Indian journalist and politician who was a member of the 10th Lok Sabha representing Durg (Lok Sabha constituency) of Madhya Pradesh State. He was also elected as member of the 4th, 5th, 7th, and 8th Lok Sabha of the Indian Parliament.

== Early life ==
Chandrakar was born on 1 January 1920 in Nipani village in Durg district. Chandrakar became a journalist 1945 for the Hindustan Times, with stories also published in other Indian and foreign newspapers.. He reported on nine Olympic Games and three Asian Games. Chandrakar served as an editor at Daily India.

In 1970, Chandrakar was elected to the Lok Sabha for the first of five times. He served as the minister of tourism, civil aviation, agriculture, rural development. Chandrakar became a general secretary of All India Committee and a spokesman of the Madhya Pradesh Congress Committee. Chhattisgarh remained the President of State All-Party Forum

Chandrakar died on February 2, 1995.

The Chhattisgarh government established the Chandulal Chandrakar Fellowship in his memory
