= Bemetara district =

- District of Chhattisgarh
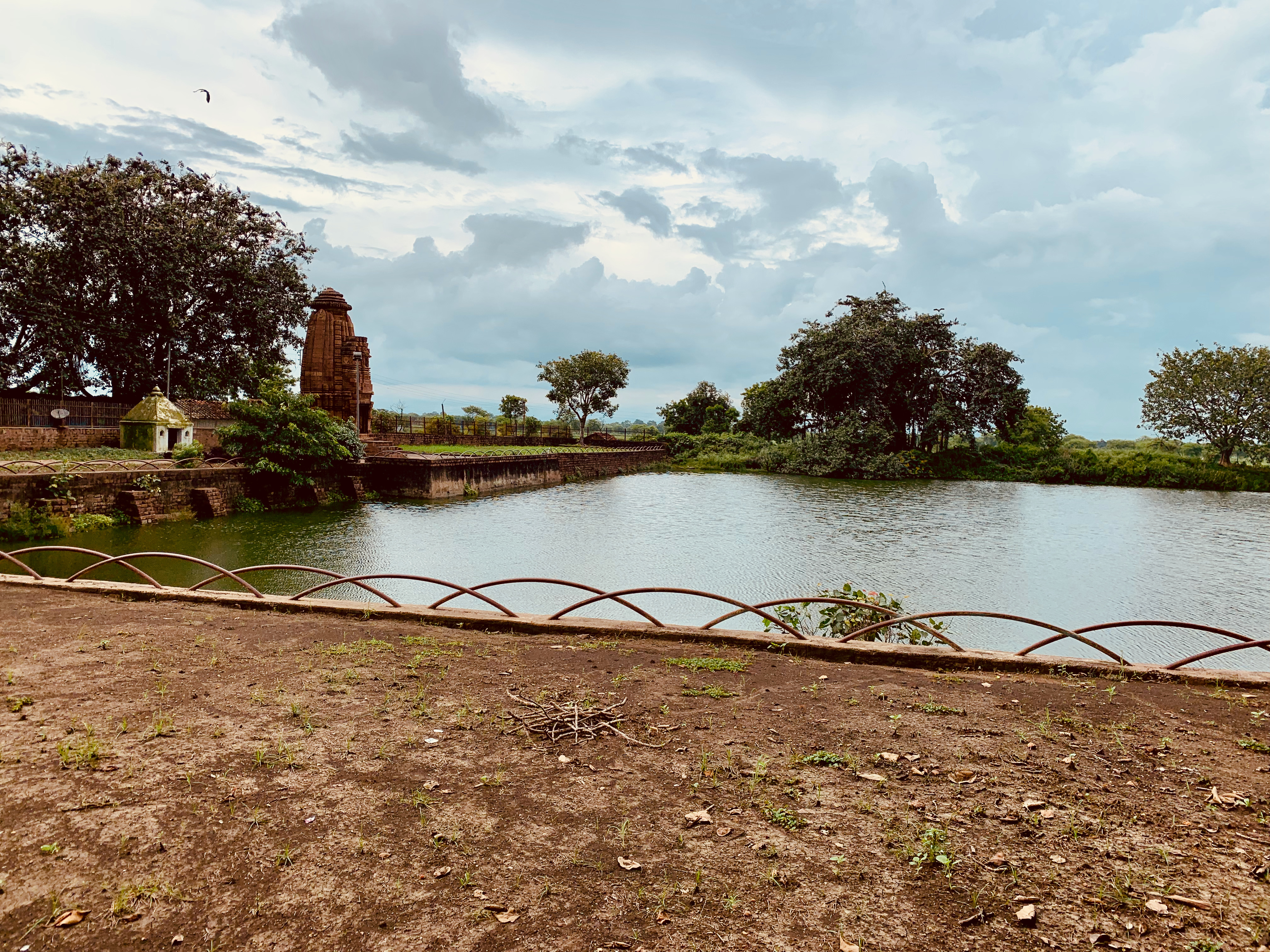
- Deorbeeja Sita Temple
- Interactive map of Bemetara district
- Coordinates (Bemetara): 21.72°N 81.53°E
- Country: India
- State: Chhattisgarh
- Division: Durg
- Headquarters: Bemetara
- Tehsils: 5

Area
  - Total: 2,854.81 km^{2} (1,102.25 sq mi)

Population (2011)
  - Total: 795,759
  - Density: 278.743/km^{2} (721.942/sq mi)

Demographics
  - Literacy: 54.24%
- Time zone: UTC+05:30 (IST)
- Major highways: NH12
- Website: bemetara.gov.in/en/

Bemetara district is a new district in the state of Chhattisgarh, India. Bemetara city is administrative headquarter of the district.

The district was formally inaugurated by the Chief Minister, Raman Singh, on 13 January 2012. Shruti Singh, IAS became the first district collector. Bemetara has two administrative subdivisions, Bemetara and Saja.

The present collector of Bemetara is Vilas Sandeepan Bhoskar, IAS.

== Demographics ==
Religions in Bemetara district (2011)
| Religion | Percent |
| Hinduism | 98.26% |
| Islam | 0.86% |
| Other or not stated | 0.88% |
Distribution of religions

The district has a population of 795,759, of which 74,567 (9.37%) live in urban areas. Bemetara district has a sex ratio of 1001 females per 1000 males and a literacy rate of 70.58%. Scheduled Castes and Scheduled Tribes make up 18.10% and 4.67% of the population respectively.

Languages of Bemetara district (2011)
1. Chhattisgarhi (97.4%)
2. Hindi (1.96%)
3. Others (0.61%)

According to the 2011 census, 97.43% of the population spoke Chhattisgarhi and 1.96% Hindi as their first language.

== Administration ==
=== Blocks/Mandals ===
Bemetara district consists of 5 tehsils (taluka). The following is a list of the tehsils (talukas) in Bemetara district:

1. Nawagarh
2. Bemetara
3. Saja
4. Than Khamharia
5. Berla

== Economy ==
The economy of Bemetara is based on agriculture. Almost 80% of the people in Bemetara work on their fields and farms. Another 10% are government employees in various departments, such as education, irrigation, PWD and FCIs. The remaining 10% of the population is involved in the business, real estate, and retail sector. The excise department of Bemetara collects around 5 crore in taxes.

== Culture ==
Bemetara's culture is influenced by Chhattisgarhi ethics, rituals, and customs. As with other regions in Chhattisgarh, this area also organises Mandai, Panthi, Mela on different occasions. Matar is conducted on the behalf of Bhai Dooj celebration which is the second day after Lakshmi Puja (Diwali), while Mandai and Mela are celebrated in Magh Purnima (February–March) season. Apart from Diwali, Holi and other Hindu festivals, regional festivals are also celebrated. These are Hareli, Pola, Tija, Deo Uthani Ekadashi, Kartic Poornima, etc.
