= Bhupesh Baghel =

Indian politician (born 1960)

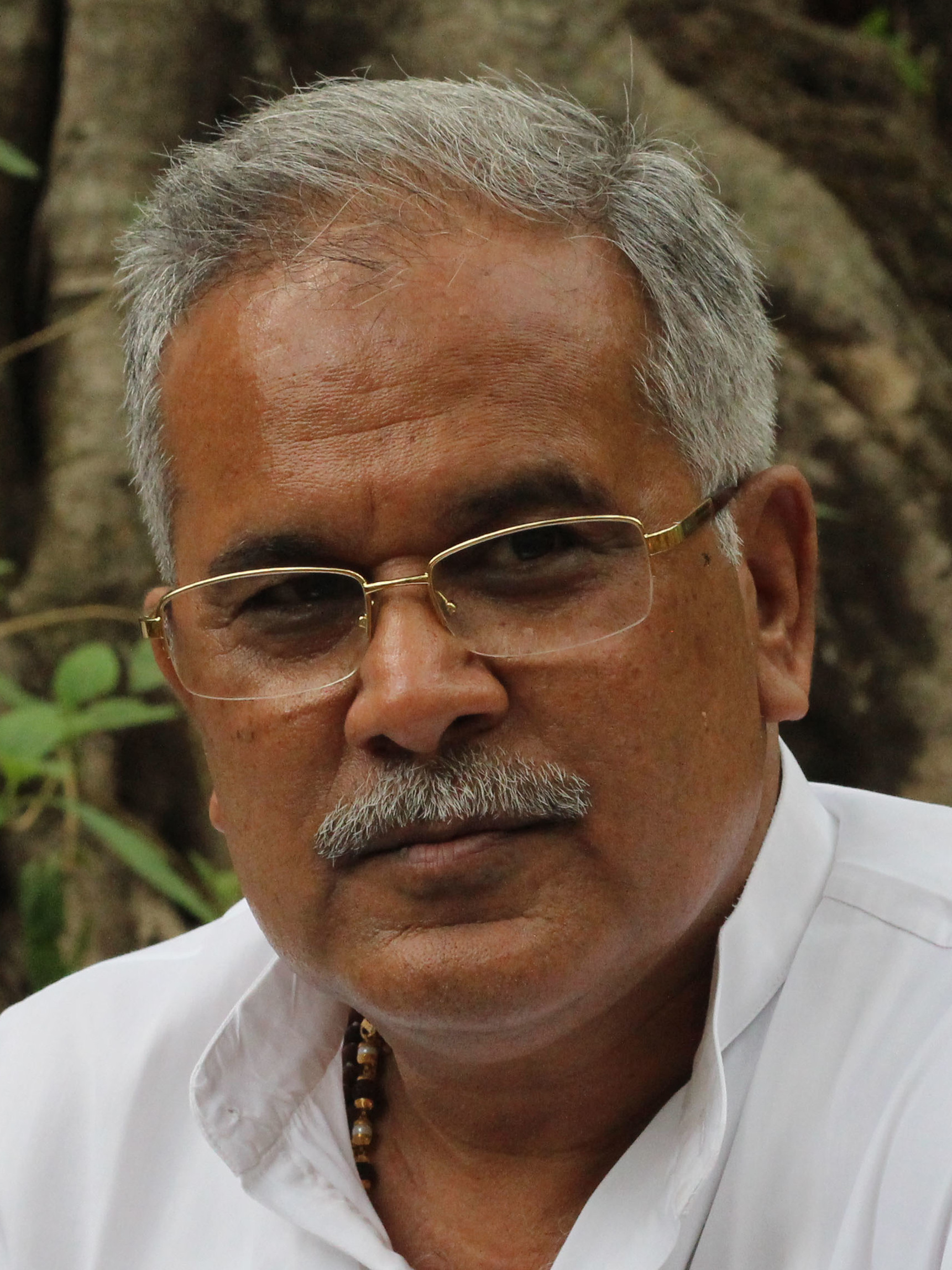
- Official Portrait, 2018

3rd Chief Minister of Chhattisgarh
- In office 17 December 2018 – 13 December 2023
- Preceded by: Raman Singh
- Succeeded by: Vishnu Deo Sai

Member of the Chhattisgarh Legislative Assembly
- Incumbent
- Assumed office 16 December 2013
- Preceded by: Vijay Baghel
- Constituency: Patan
- Majority: 19,723 (2023)
- In office 1993–2008
- Preceded by: Constituency Established
- Succeeded by: Vijay Baghel
- Constituency: Patan
- Succeeded by: Vishnu Deo Sai

AICC Incharge for Punjab Pradesh Congress Committee
- Incumbent
- Assumed office 14 February 2025
- Preceded by: Devender Yadav

President of Chhattisgarh Pradesh Congress Committee
- In office 2014–2019
- Preceded by: Charan Das Mahant
- Succeeded by: Mohan Markam

Minister of Transportation, Government of Madhya Pradesh
- In office 1999–2003
- Chief Minister: Digvijaya Singh

Personal details
- Born: 23 August 1960 (age 66) Durg, Chhattisgarh, India
- Party: Indian National Congress
- Spouse: Mukteshwari Baghel
- Children: 4
- Education: Pandit Ravishankar Shukla University, Raipur (M.A.)

Bhupesh Baghel (born 23 August 1960), also known as Kaka, is an Indian politician who served as the third Chief Minister of Chhattisgarh from 2018 to 2023 and also served as leader of the house in legislative assembly. He has been the president of Chhattisgarh Pradesh Congress from 2014 to 2019. He has represented the Patan constituency in the Chhattisgarh Legislative Assembly from 2003 to 2008 and again since 2013. He was the cabinet minister of Transportation in undivided Madhya Pradesh in Digvijaya Singh government from 1999 to 2003. Baghel was the first Minister for Revenue, Public Health Engineering and Relief Work in Chhattisgarh.

== Personal life ==
Baghel was born on 23 August 1960 in the Durg district. He is the son of Nande Kumar Baghel and Bindeshwari Baghel. His family's primary occupation was agriculture.

Baghel is married to Mukteshwari Baghel. They have one son and three daughters. Baghel belongs to the Kurmi OBC community. His wife, Mukteshwari Baghel, is the daughter of noted Hindi writer Dr. Narendra Dev Verma and the niece of spiritual leader Swami Atmanand.

== Political career ==
=== Beginning and rise ===
Bhupesh Baghel began his political career at the Indian Youth Congress and became a member of the All India Congress Committee, he was also the General Secretary and Program Coordinator of the Pradesh Congress Committee. He was first elected to the Madhya Pradesh Legislative Assembly in 1993 from Patan and was later elected five times from the same seat.

Baghel was appointed the Minister of State, Chief Minister related to Public Grievances Redressal (Independent Charge), M.P. Governance in Digvijay Singh's cabinet in December 1997 and became Minister of Transport in December 1998.

After the state of Chhattisgarh was formed in November 1999, he became a member of the Chhattisgarh Legislative Assembly and was appointed as Minister, of Revenue Rehabilitation, Relief Work, and Public Health Mechanics under CG Governance. He once again became MLA in the 2002 state election from the same seat. He lost the Patan assembly seat in 2008 elections. He also lost parliamentary elections in 2009 from Raipur. He lost the Rajnandgaon Lok Sabha constituency in 2024, following his government's defeat in state elections in 2023.

Baghel won the Patan Vidhan Sabha seat in the 2013 election and became a member of the Working Committee, Chhattisgarh Assembly. In 2014-15, he became a member of the Public Accounts Committee, CG Government.

=== President of Chhattisgarh Congress ===
Baghel was President of the state unit of the Indian National Congress from October 2014 to June 2019. After the attack on several of the top Congress leaders in the 2013 Naxal attack in Darbha Valley, Baghel assumed leadership responsibilities in the party's state unit following the incident. He managed to sideline ex-Chief Minister Ajit Jogi and his son Amit Jogi in state congress after the Antagarh Assembly by-election audio tape row.

Under his presidency, the Chhattisgarh Congress won the 2018 Chhattisgarh Legislative Assembly election by a majority of 68 out of 90 seats.

=== Controversies ===
In March 2025, he was named as an accused in a FIR filed by the Central Bureau of Investigation (CBI) in connection with the Mahadev betting app case.

The Enforcement Directorate (ED) raided several locations linked to Bhupesh Baghel and his son Chaitanya Baghel. In July 2025, ED arrested his son Chaitanya Baghel for allegedly laundering ₹16.7 crore (US$1.8 million) in connection with a ₹2,100 crore (US$220 million) liquor scam.

== Positions held ==
Year	Position
1990-94	President, District Youth Congress Committee
1994–95	Vice President, M.P. Youth Congress Committee (MP)
1993-2001	Member: M.P. Assembly Estimates Committee; Member: MP Consultative Committee of the Aviation Department of Legislative Assembly; Member: M.P. Food and Civil Supplies Corporation; Director: M.P. Housing Board; Member: M.P. Backward Classes Organization; Member: M.P. Sainik Board
1993-2000	Member: MP Legislative Assembly
2000-2008 and 2013-till date	Member: Chhattisgarh Legislative Assembly
1993-2008	Member: M.P. And CG Assembly Constituency Patan, District-Durg (MP)
2003-2008	Deputy Leader, Congress Legislative Party, Chhattisgarh
December 2013 - June 2019	President, Chhattisgarh Pradesh Congress Committee
1996 – present	Guardian, Chhattisgarh Manwa Kurmi Samaj
2018 - 2023	Chief Minister of Chhattisgarh
2025 - 2026	AICC General Secretary incharge of Punjab Pradesh Congress Committee
2026 - present	AICC General Secretary incharge of Assam Pradesh Congress Committee

== Chief Minister of Chhattisgarh (2018-2023) ==
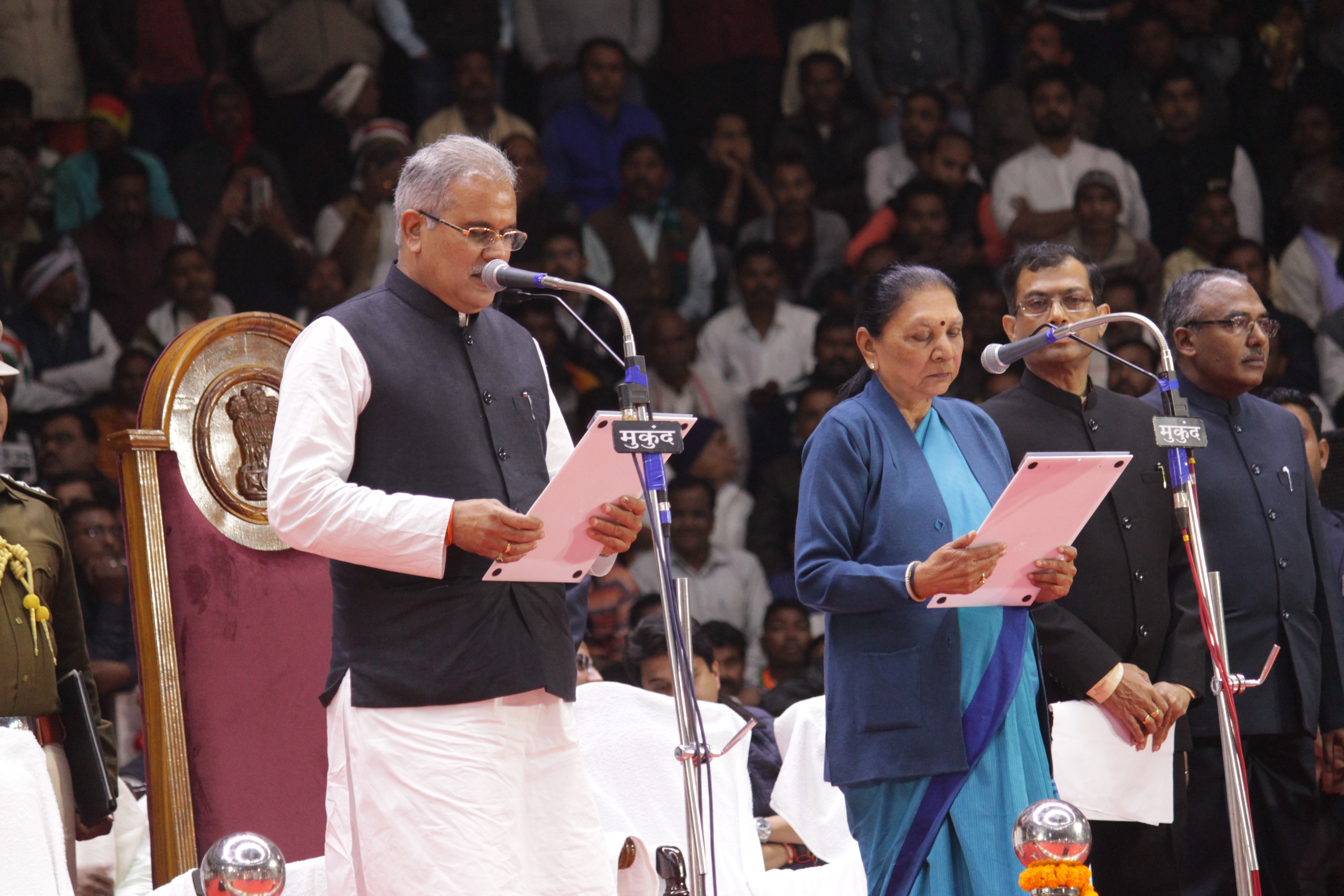
On 17 December 2018, Bhupesh Baghel took oath as the third Chief Minister of Chhattisgarh.

Baghel became MLA from the Patan assembly seat again and became the Chief Minister of the state, defeating BJP’s Raman Singh, after leading the opposition in Chhattisgarh State Assembly for 15 years. He took oath as chief minister on 17 December 2018. He was replaced by Kondagaon MLA Mohan Markam as PCC President in June 2019.

Baghel’s government implemented two poll promises: a farm loan waiver and raising paddy support price by 50%. The order letter was released shortly after the oath-taking ceremony, though money transfers to farmers took days, weeks, and months in some cases. Tendu patta things prices were increased. The government made a really big step away from shiksha-karmi (temporary teacher) policy and vacancies for posts of 15,000 permanent teachers were announced.

=== Welfare schemes ===
==== Narva, Garva, Ghurva, Bari ====
The Narva, Garva, Ghurva, Bari (NGGB) scheme was launched to ensure water conservation, livestock protection and development, the use of organic compost through household waste, and cultivating fruits and vegetables in backyards for self-consumption and earning additional income.

==== Rajiv Gandhi Kisan Nyay Yojana ====
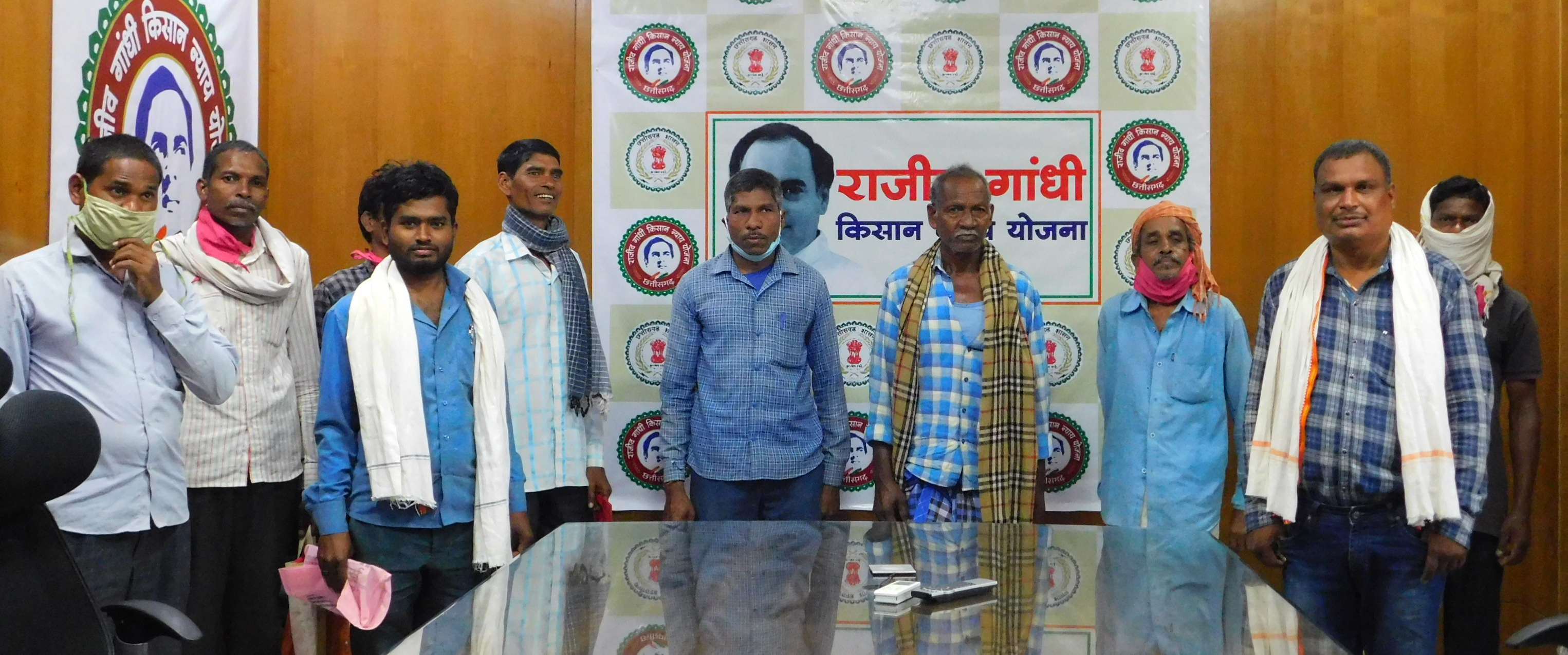
Beneficiary farmers of Rajiv Gandhi Kisan Nyay Yojana

In the 2020 state money limit presented by the Chhattisgarh government, a provision of Rs 5700 crore was made for the welfare of farmers through which Rajiv Gandhi Kisan Nyay Yojana was launched on 21 May, the martyrdom day of former Prime Minister Rajiv Gandhi.

In Chhattisgarh, the total cultivable land area is 46.77 lakh hectares. 70% of the state population is engaged in agriculture and around 37.46 Lakh are farm families. The objective of Rajiv Gandhi Kisan Nyay Yojana is to encourage crop production and increase agricultural acreage. An amount of Rs 5750 crores is transferred to the accounts of farmers in four installments under the scheme in a year. Chhattisgarh is the only state procuring paddy from farmers at Rs 2,500 per quintal, which is higher than what the Centre has set. More than 23.99 lakh farmers in the state are benefiting from this scheme. Under the scheme, a provision was made to give input subsidies to farmers producing paddy, sugarcane, maize, soybean, pulses and oilseeds in the Kharif season 2021-22. Later, the provision of this scheme was modified to include Kodo, Kutki and Ragi, and an input subsidy of Rs.9,000 per acre for millet farmers. The government of Chhattisgarh has also decided to include the landless agricultural labourers in the second phase of the Rajiv Gandhi Kisan Nyay Yojana.

On 17 October 2022, farmers received a total of Rs.1,745 crores to prepare for the upcoming Rabi season under this scheme. Amount as input subsidy transferred directly into the bank accounts of 23.99 lakh farmers in the state. The state government has given farmers Rs.16,416.10 crores since its commencement. Farmers who plant trees in the fields will also be given an input subsidy of Rs.10 thousand per year. Chief Minister said the Chhattisgarh government has stated that its ‘Nyay’ schemes aim to promote social and economic support programs, namely Rajiv Gandhi Kisan Nyay Yojana (RGKNY), Godhan Nyay Yojana and Rajiv Gandhi Grameen Bhumiheen Krishi Mazdoor Nyay Yojana (RGGBKMNY).

==== Godhan Nyay Yojana ====
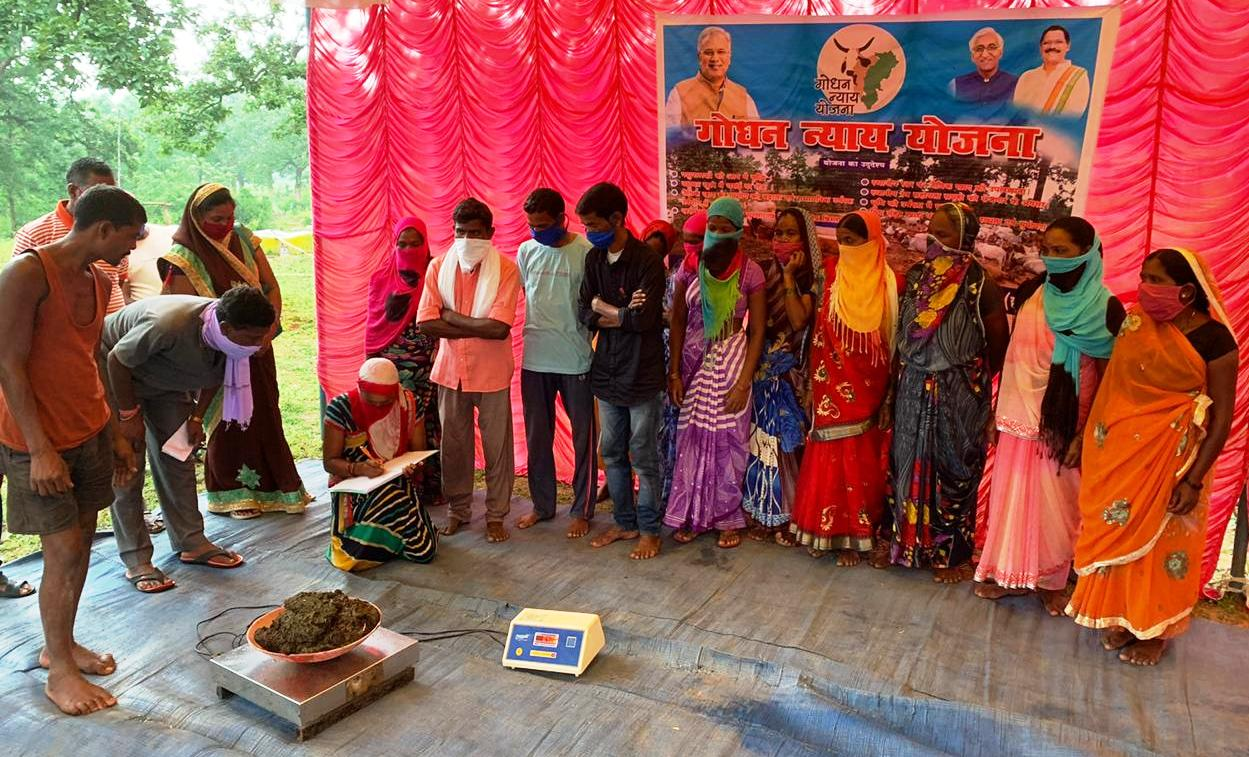
Purchase of cow dung in Manora block of Jashpur district of Chhattisgarh

On 21 July 2020, the Baghel-led Chhattisgarh government launched the Godhan Nyay Yojana to promote organic farming, create new employment opportunities at the rural and urban levels, promote cow rearing and cow protection, and benefit cattle farmers financially. As per the scheme, the government will procure cow dung at ₹2 per kilogram from farmers and cattle rearers. After the procurement, the cow dung will be converted to vermicompost and other products by members of the Women Self-Help Group, which will be sold to farmers as organic manure for ₹8 per kilogram, with the aim of promoting organic alternatives to chemical fertilizers.

As per an October 2022 report, ₹5.59 crores have been paid to the livestock owners under Godhan Nyay Yojana. Under the scheme, 162,497 cattle rearers of the state are benefiting, which includes 70,299 landless villagers and 44.55 percent of the beneficiaries of the Godhan Nyay Yojana are women. 312,647 cow dung traders were registered in 2021–22, up from 245,831 in 2020–21.

On the occasion of Hareli, a traditional festival of Chhattisgarh, the Chief Minister started the purchase of gaumutra (cow urine) under the scheme. The government has fixed a minimum rate of Rs 4 per litre of cow urine. According to a Chhattisgarh government official, the procured cow urine will be used to make pest control products and natural liquid fertilizer, A total of 24,547 litres of pest controller Brahmastra and 16,722 litres of Jeevamrit have been prepared from 70,889 litres of cow urine purchased in Gauthans. Beneficiaries earned Rs.14.75 lakh from selling 34,085 litres of Brahmastra and Jeevamrit.

The scheme has been reported to create employment opportunities in regions affected by Maoist insurgency as well. Also around 300 gauthan cum industrial parks will be set up in Chhattisgarh under the Mahatma Gandhi Rural Industrial Parks (MGRIP) scheme. Prime Minister Narendra Modi has also praised the Godhan Nyaya Yojana in the seventh meeting of the Governing Council of NITI Aayog. To strengthen the economic condition of the villages, the Jharkhand, Madhya Pradesh and Uttar Pradesh governments also adopted the Chhattisgarh model. Madhya Pradesh Government will run Gobar-Dhan project for the purchase of cow dung.

==== Swami Atmanand English Medium School ====
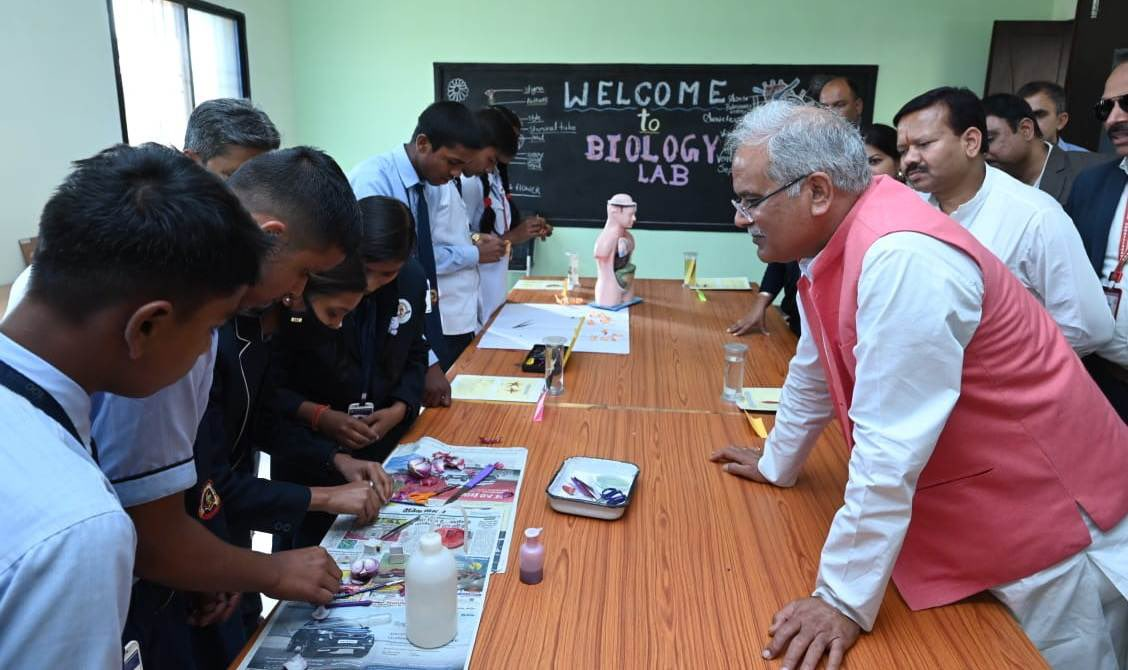
Chief Minister Bhupesh Baghel interacting with the students of Swami Atmanand School in Jamgaon, Patan.

In Chhattisgarh, Swami Atmanand chose to work with locals, specifically young people in the area. He has devoted his time to tribal people and has inspired young people by teaching them about compassion and serving others. On November 1 2020, to mark Statehood Day, Chief Minister Bhupesh Baghel unveiled the scheme.

On 3 July 2020, the state's initial Swami Atmanand School was inaugurated. 52 schools opened their doors in various cities that same year. The stated goal of the scheme was to establish educational institutions in Chhattisgarh that have excellent facilities at par with private schools but are accessible and affordable for the parents of economically weaker sections of society as well.

Bhupesh Baghel said that the government would also establish English medium government colleges in various cities across the state to increase higher education in the region. In the beginning, ten institutions will be launched in ten cities.

=== Encouragement towards Sports ===
Bhupesh Baghel, the former Chief Minister of India’s state of Chhattisgarh, promoted sports initiatives in the state.. Baghel who has taken charge as the Chief Minister has already hosted the Road Safety World Series at the state capital Raipur.

Chhattisgarh chief minister Bhupesh Baghel also inaugurated the state’s own Olympics, called 'Chhattisgarhiya Olympics', with the stated aim of promoting traditional games namely langdi, bhaura, bati (kancha), and pitthul. “These games are not only entertaining but also beneficial for maintaining good physical and mental health. In rural areas, children, elderly, and youth—all will engage in these games for entertainment and to keep themselves fit”, Baghel commented.

=== Upliftment of tribals ===
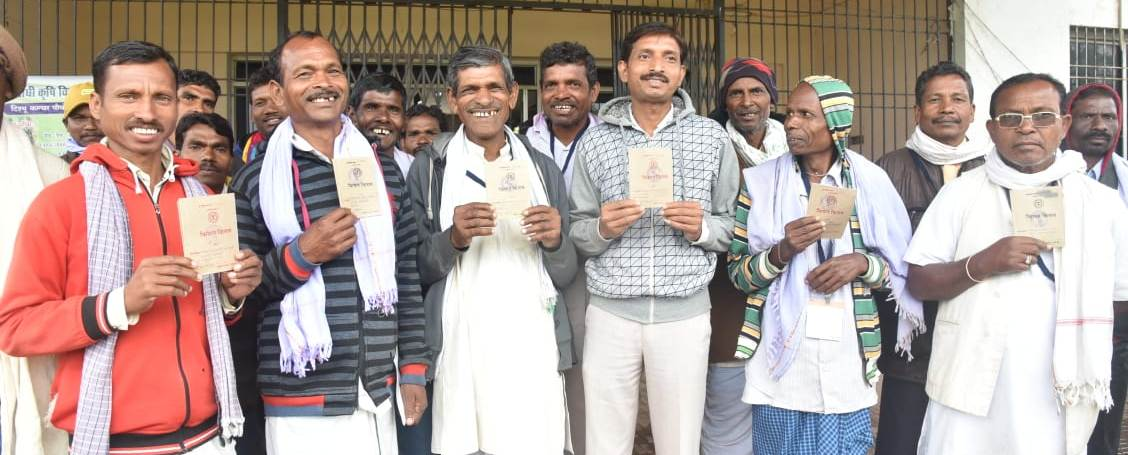
The new government returned the land acquired for the steel plant of farmers of Lohandiguda in Bastar district.

==== Repatriation of tribal land ====
Under an MoU signed between the then govt and Tata Steel in 2005, agricultural land was acquired from the local tribals in 10 villages around Lohandiguda in the Bastar region. Despite protests from the villagers, the govt went ahead with the acquisition to build a 5.5 million tonne per annum capacity mega integrated steel plant. Tata Steel decided to quit the project in 2016. Immediately after coming to power, Chief Minister Bhupesh Baghel decided to return 4400 acres to 1707 tribal families. The land was returned to the immediate owners or their legal heirs per the provisions of the 'Right to Fair Compensation and Transparency in Land Acquisition, Rehabilitation and Resettlement Act, 2013 under Section 101. Section 101 stipulates that if any land acquired remains underutilised for 5 years from the date of taking over the possession the same shall be returned to the original owners of their legal heirs.

=== Ram Van Gaman Path ===
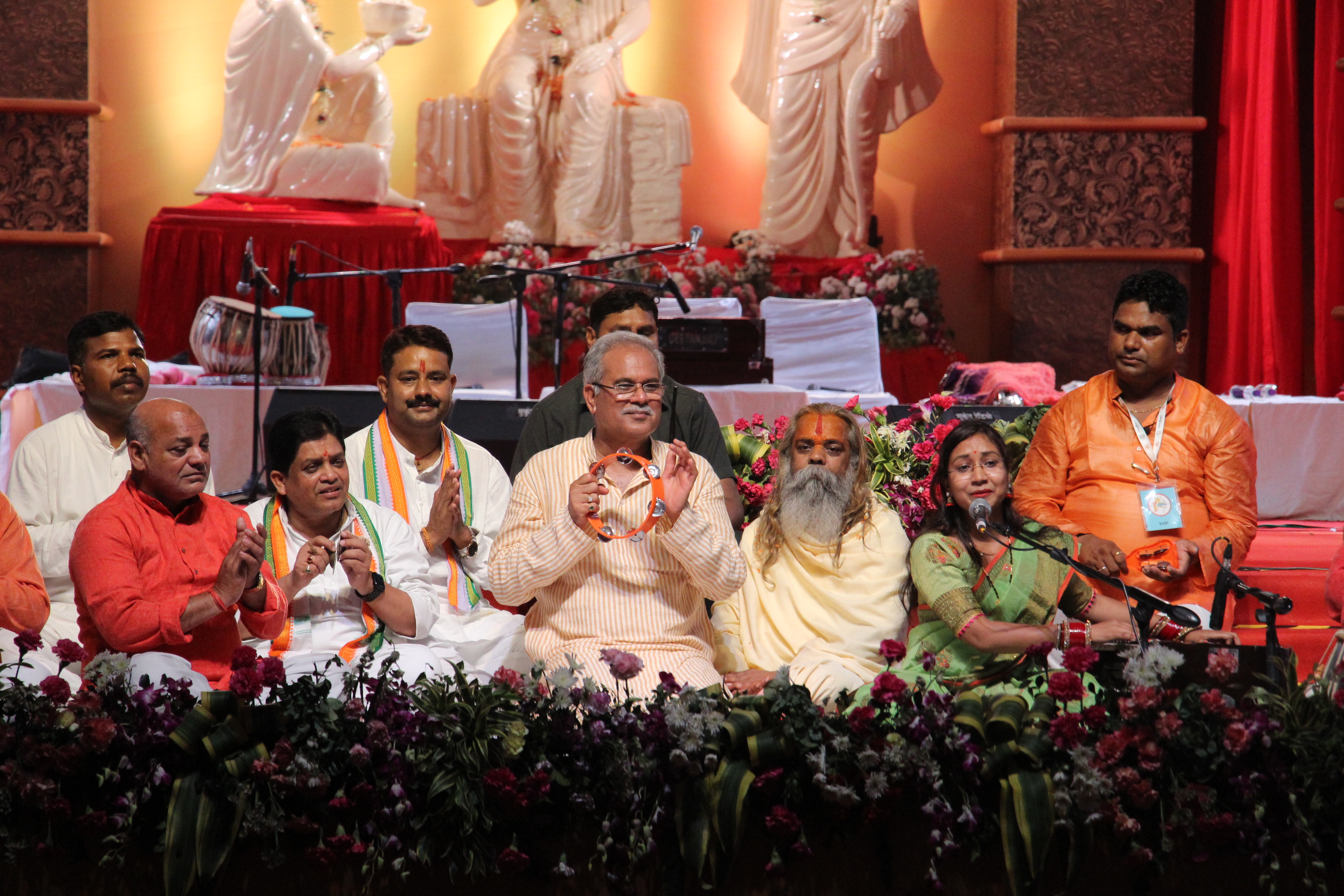
Chief Minister Bhupesh Baghel turned up during the event at Kaushalya Mandir Chandkhuri, Raipur.

The 2226 km long 'Ram Van Gaman Path' is being developed for with a budget of Rs 137.45 crore. 'Ram Van Gaman Path' begins from the Surguja district in northern Chhattisgarh, traverses through the state, and ends in the Sukma district.

=== Health Policy ===
==== Mukhyamantri Haat Bazar Clinic ====
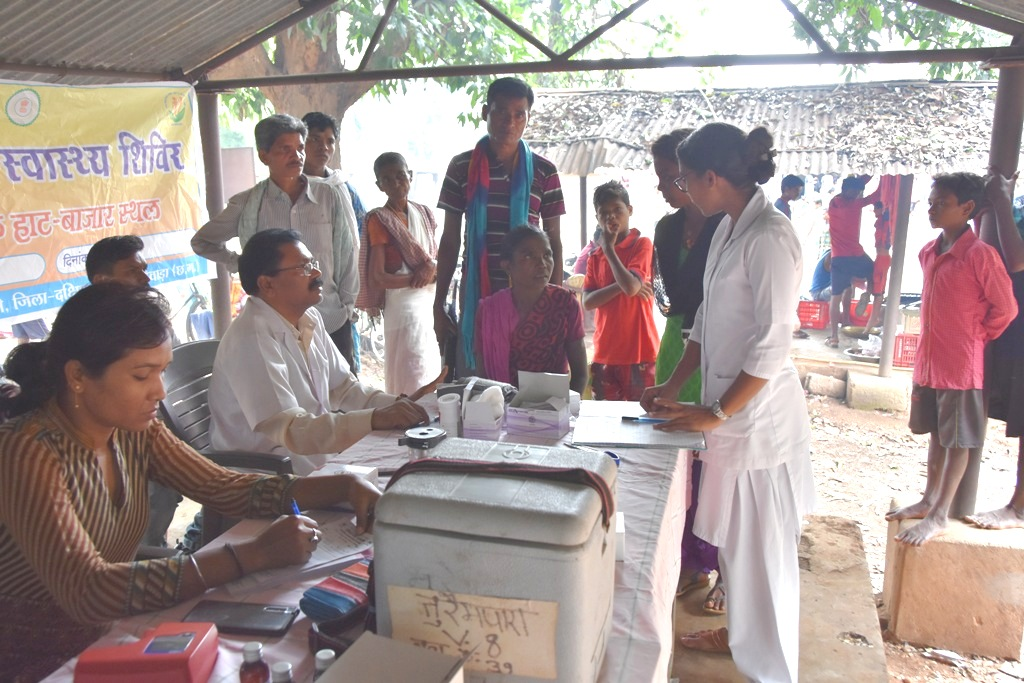
Health checkup at one of Haat Bazaar Clinics in Dantewada district of Chhattisgarh

The state of Chhattisgarh has 44% forest cover, and as a result, a significantly large population lives in forests and remote areas. Due to neglect and difficult terrain, the population in such areas doesn't have access to quality health care. On 2 October 2019, Baghel launched the Mukhyamantri Haat Bazaar Clinic Yojana, a mobile healthcare scheme that was introduced to provide medical services in remote areas of these people. Under this scheme, mobile healthcare vans are deputed at weekly haat bazaars (local markets) frequented by forest dwellers selling minor forest produce. Staffed by specialist doctors and other qualified staff with the necessary equipment, these mobile clinics provide healthcare checkups and medicine to people.

In the past four years, 1.28 lakh Haat-bazaar clinics have provided healthcare services to more than 6,247,000 individuals. The 429 medical mobile vans used to operate the 1798 haat-bazaar clinic programme. Also, the World Health Organization (WHO) has prepared a documentary film on the Haat Bazaar Clinic scheme in Chhattisgarh.

==== Dai-Didi Clinic ====
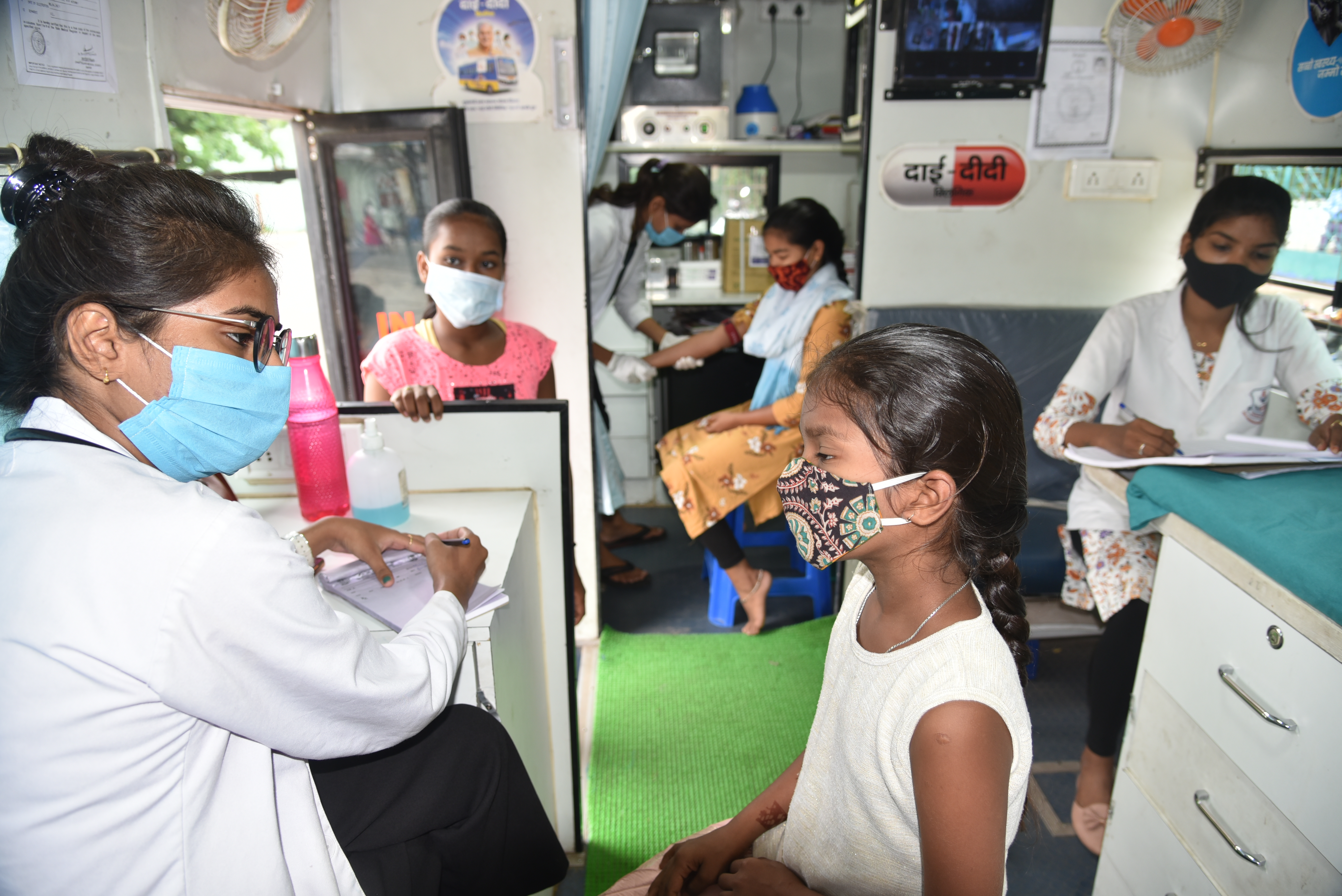
Free treatment of girls inside the mobile medical unit.

The 'Chief Minister Dai-Didi Clinic' scheme is being run by the Urban Administration and Development Department of Chhattisgarh Government. Under the scheme, a team of female doctors and staff arrives in the vehicle of Dai-Didi Clinic's mobile medical unit and provides free treatment for various diseases to needy women and girls.

Through the scheme, about 1,475 camps have been set up in the state so far and more than 1.28 lakh women and girls living in slums of Raipur, Bilaspur and Bhilai Municipal Corporation areas have been treated near their homes.

==== Malaria Mukt Bastar ====
Malaria is a major public health concern in India and a major contributor to the malaria burden in Southeast Asia. Several factors contribute to the prevalence and incidents including socio-economic factors, geographical region, and drug resistance. Bastar region of Chhattisgarh has the highest Annual Parasite Incidence (API) (malaria) in India. Timely diagnosis due to limited infrastructure compounds the problem.

Launching the “Malaria Mukt Bastar” on 26 January 2020, Bhupesh Baghel pledged to make Bastar Malaria-free in the coming days. In the first phase of the campaign, 14 lakh people were tested in Bastar, out of which 64,646 (4.60%) were found malaria-infected. The second phase of the campaign started on 6 June and ended on 31 July in which more than 23 lakh people have been examined. The process of medication for the victims has begun. In March 2021, for the first time in the history of Chhattisgarh, the annual malaria parasite rate recorded the lowest - API rate reached 1.17, the minimum since the formation of the state.

==== Mukhyamantri Suposhan Abhiyan ====
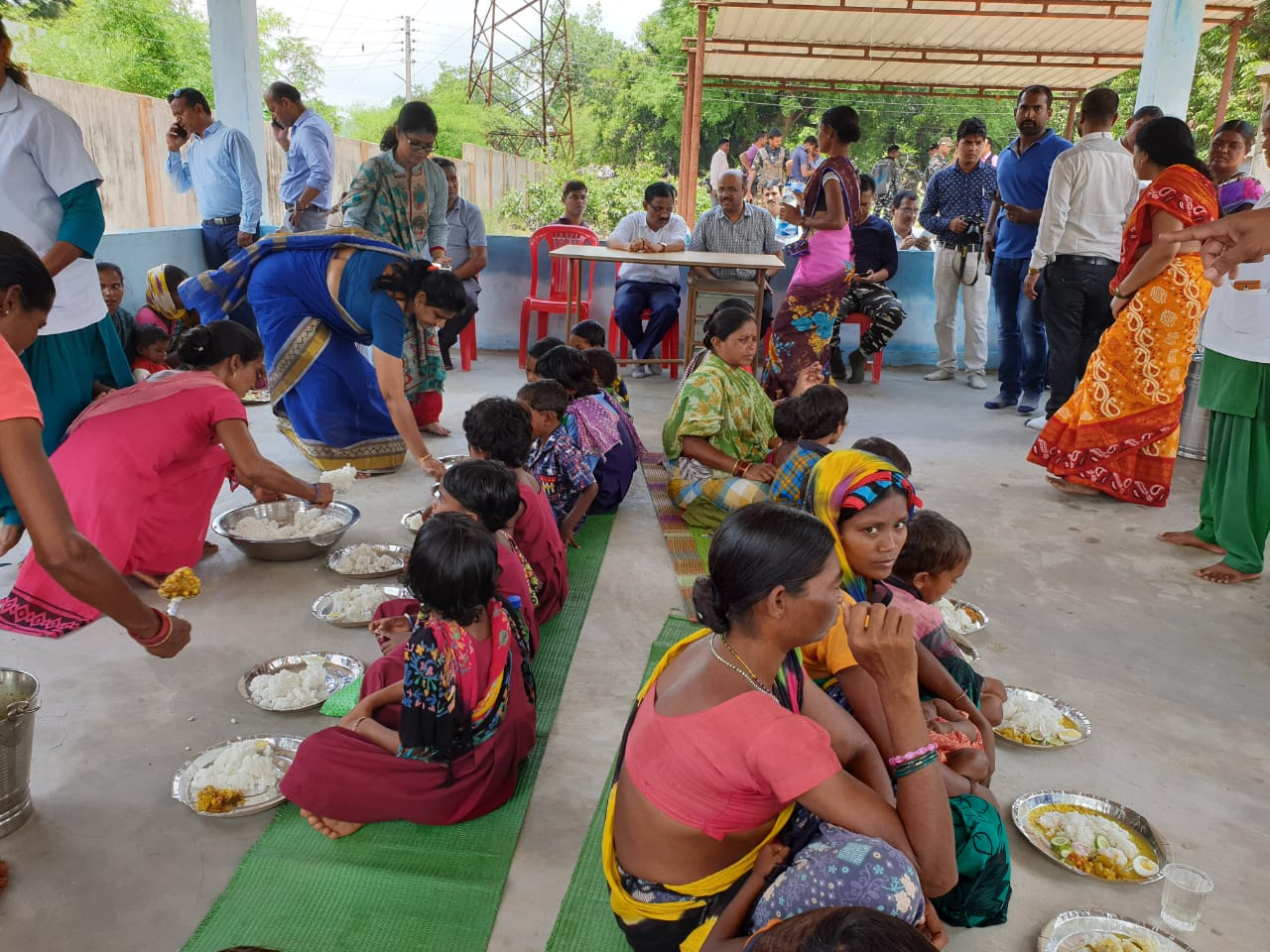
Beneficiary women and children being served midday meal under Mukhyamantri Suposhan Abiyan.

National Health Family Survey (NHFS)- 4 (2015–16), Chhattisgarh is one of the top states in India with high levels of malnutrition and anaemia among children and women. The scheme launched on 2 October 2019 on the occasion of Mahatma Gandhi’s 150 birth anniversary aims to reduce malnutrition and anaemia levels in the state in the next three years. As of March 2020, around 68 thousand children were cured of malnutrition in one year under this campaign.

=== COVID-19 Management ===
The state government implemented measures to contain the spread of COVID-19. During the lockdown, the state government announced several measures to help the affected individuals, particularly the impoverished and migrant workers.

Rice was made available to all the beneficiaries under the Public Distribution System. The state's Labor Department approved Rs.3.8 crore to help workers impacted by the lockdown. Along with this, Bhupesh Baghel ensured the availability of hospital beds, medicine supplies, PSA plant and oxygen to the hospitals with the help of state administration.

To assist a collaborative effort of UNICEF and the state government, almost 3,000 volunteers were gathered in the second wave. The 'Roko Au Toko Abhiyan' or 'Stop and Advice' campaign was started to raise awareness and encourage community involvement in the state's five most severely afflicted cities. These cities included Rajnandgaon, Raipur, Durg, Bilaspur, and Baloda Bazaar.

==== Padhai Tuhar Dwar ====
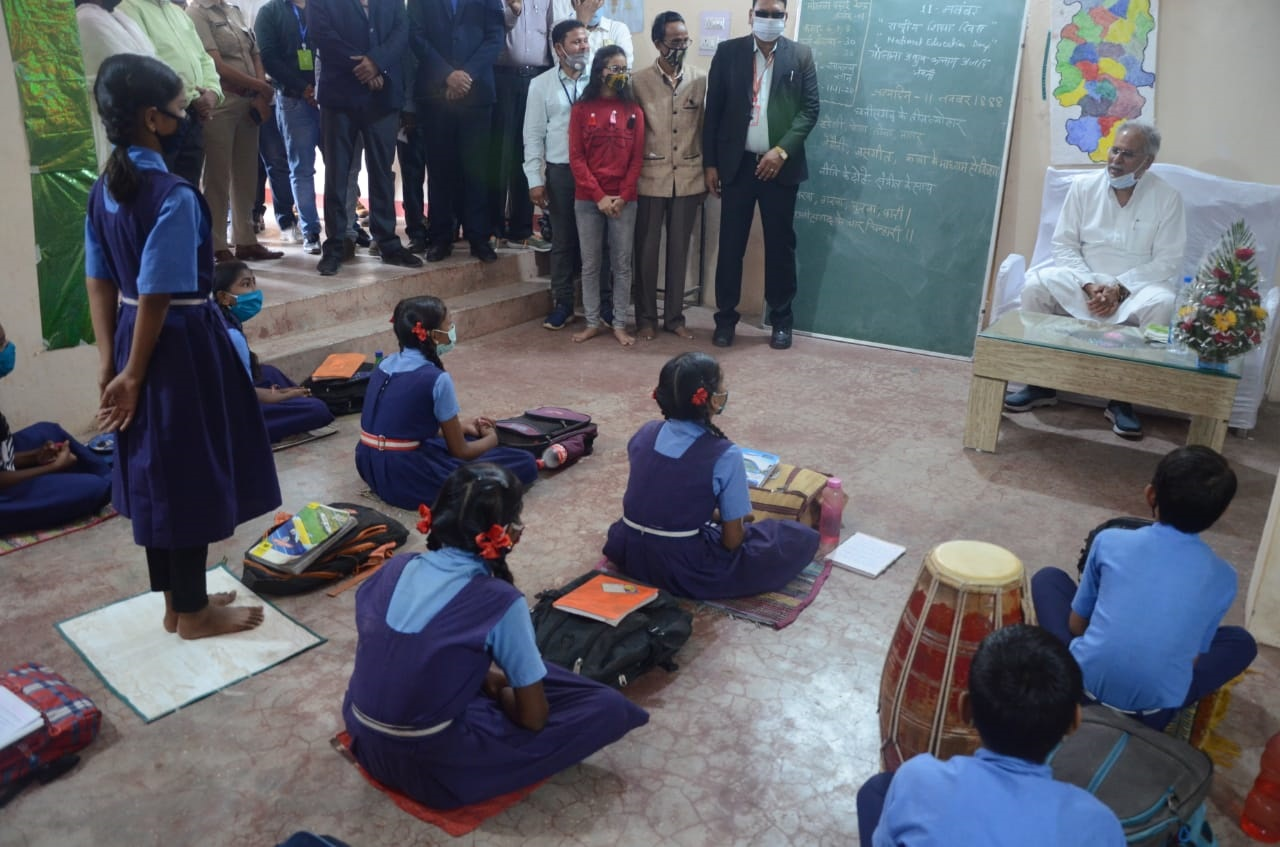
Chief Minister Bhupesh Baghel reached the Mohalla class under Padhai Tuhar Dwar in Durg district.

The campaign was launched to cover the incomplete syllabus of various classes in lockdown during the COVID-19 pandemic and to complete the syllabus in rural areas. Under Padhai Tuhar Dwar, 22 lakh children and 2 lakh teachers were benefited. The children could study despite the schools being closed during the lockdown. All study materials were available online. Being an e-class, each course could be viewed again and again. Under this, there was a facility for offline studies through loudspeakers.

Between the lockdown and unlock phases, primary and middle school children in government schools received education through Mohalla Classes and the online portal 'Padhai Tunhar Dwar'. Teachers and community members participated in support of the initiative. Extensive innovative activities were taking place in such classes following the norms specified as COVID-19 guidelines. More than 80% of the students received their education by attending Mohalla and online lessons.

Every morning from 8-9:30 am and every evening from 5-6:30 pm, the residents of the villages of the Bastar district of Chhattisgarh were the audience of a special program on Amcho Bastar Radio Channel. This community radio channel was started in June 2020 under the major initiative of the Chhattisgarh State Government's Padhai Tunhar Dwar.

==== Mahtari Dular Yojana ====
Chhattisgarh Mahatari Dular Yojana was launched in May 2021 by the state government of Chhattisgarh to help provide funds for the education of children orphaned by COVID-19. Children in Classes 1 to 8 were to receive a monthly allowance of Rs. 500, while those in Classes 9 to 12 Rs.1,000 per month. The objective of this scheme is to motivate the students not to leave their studies midway even after losing their parents. The children of families who have lost the primary earner due to COVID-19 will also have their educations paid for by the state government. These youngsters will also be given preference for enrolment in the state-run Swami Atmanand English Medium Schools.

==== MGNREGA ====
Under the Mahatma Gandhi National Rural Employment Guarantee Act (MNREGA), almost 1.21 lakh families in Chhattisgarh were employed for more than 100 days, which helped the rural economy remain steady despite the COVID-19 outbreak. By the number of households receiving the required 100 days of employment, Chhattisgarh stands sixth in the nation.

== Electoral history ==
Election	House	Constituency	Result	Party	Ref
1993	Madhya Pradesh Legislative Assembly	Patan	Won	INC	
1998	Madhya Pradesh Legislative Assembly	Patan	Won	INC	
2003	Chhattisgarh Legislative Assembly	Patan	Won	INC	
2008	Chhattisgarh Legislative Assembly	Patan	Lost	INC	
2013	Chhattisgarh Legislative Assembly	Patan	Won	INC	
2018	Chhattisgarh Legislative Assembly	Patan	Won	INC	
2023	Chhattisgarh Legislative Assembly	Patan	Won	INC	
2009	Lok Sabha	Raipur	Lost	INC	
2024	Lok Sabha	Rajnandgaon	Lost	INC	

== See also ==
- Baghel ministry

Political offices
Preceded by Dr. Raman Singh	Chief Minister of Chhattisgarh; 17 December 2018 - 11 December 2023	Succeeded by Vishnu Deo Sai
