= Godhan Nyay Yojana =

Government scheme

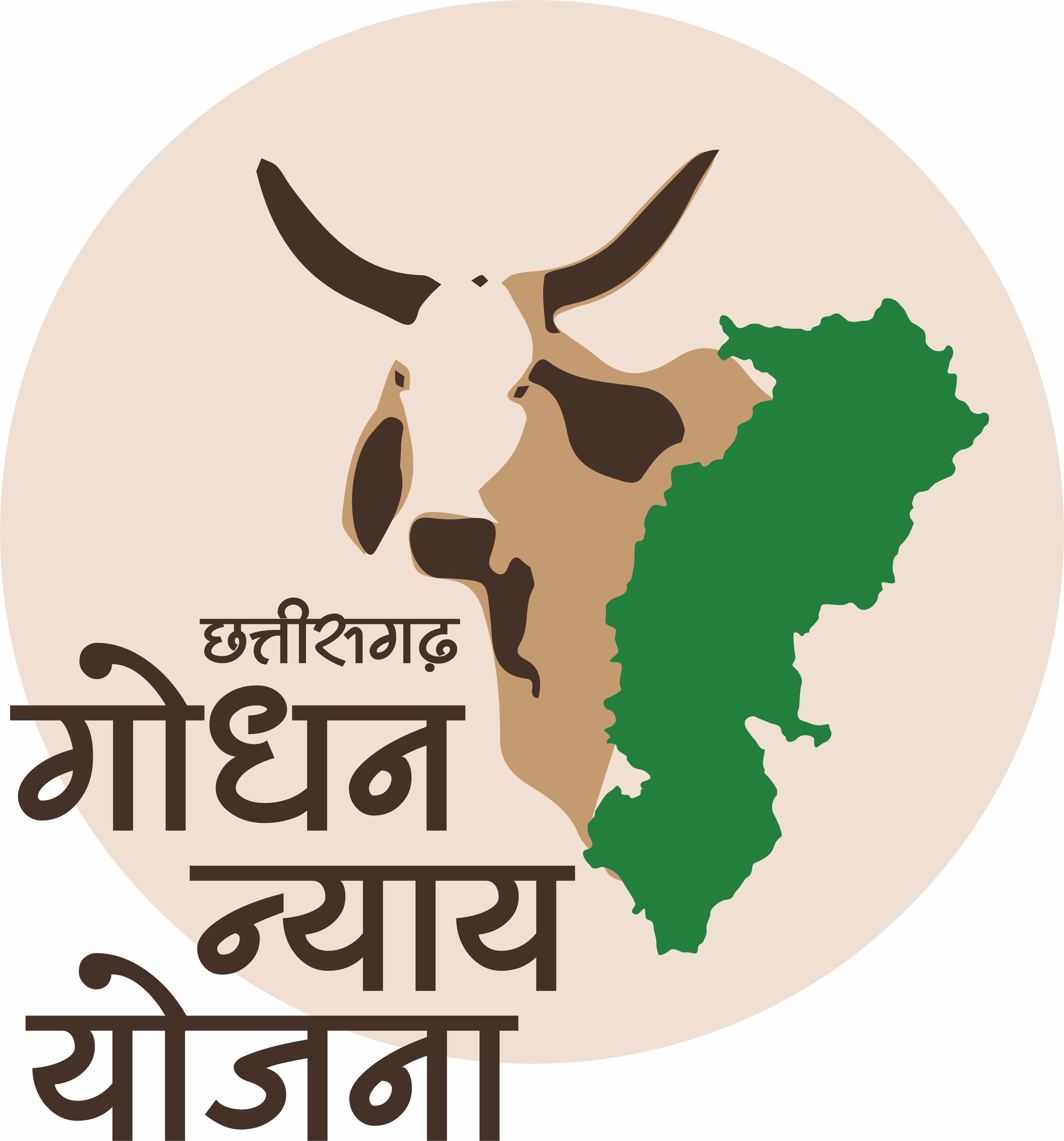
- Type of project: Economic
- Country: India
- Chief Minister: Bhupesh Baghel
- Launched: 21 July 2020; 5 years ago
- Status: Active
- Website: godhannyay.cgstate.gov.in

The Godhan Nyay Yojana was introduced by the Baghel-led Chhattisgarh government on July 21, 2020, with the goals of promoting organic farming, generating new employment possibilities in both rural and urban areas, promoting cow rearing and cow protection, and providing financial benefits to cattle producers. According to the plan, the government will buy cow dung from farmers and livestock raisers for ₹2 per kilogram. Following procurement, members of the Women Self-Help Group will transform the cow dung into vermicompost and other products, which will then be sold to farmers as an organic manure for ₹8 per kilogram, discouraging the use of chemical fertilizers.

₹5.59 crores have been paid to livestock owners under the Godhan Nyay Yojana, according to a report from October 2022. 1,62,497 cattle farmers in the state benefited from the program, including 70,299 landless villagers. Women make up 44.55 percent of the Godhan Nyay Yojana's beneficiaries. In 2021–22, 3,12,647 cow dung traders were officially registered, up from 2,45,831 in 2020–21.

After the success of the cow dung purchase under the scheme, the Chief Minister launched the purchase of gaumutra (cow urine) on the occasion of Hareli, a traditional festival of Chhattisgarh. For the procurement of cow urine, the government set a minimum price of ₹4 per litre. The obtained cow urine will be utilised to create natural liquid fertiliser and pest control solutions, according to a Chhattisgarh government official. From the 70,889 litres of cow urine purchased at cow shelters(Gauthan), a total of 24,547 litres of pest control Brahmastra and 16,722 litres of Jeevamrit have been made. The sale of 34,085 litres of Brahmastra and Jeevamrit brought in Rs. 14.75 lakh for the beneficiaries.

Resulting Godhan scheme opens new job avenues in Maoist-hit areas as well. According to the Mahatma Gandhi Rural Industrial Parks (MGRIP) project, about 300 Gauthan cum industrial parks would also be built in Chhattisgarh. The Godhan Nyay Yojana has also received admiration from Prime Minister Narendra Modi during the seventh meeting of the Governing Council of NITI Aayog. The governments of Jharkhand, Madhya Pradesh, and Uttar Pradesh also followed the Chhattisgarh model to improve the economic situation of the villages. Gobar-Dhan, a program for purchasing of cow dung, is being managed by the Madhya Pradesh government.
