= Swami Atmanand English Medium School =

Chain of schools in Chhattisgarh, India

Swami Atmanand Government Excellent School

Information
- Other name: SAGES
- Established: 1 November 2020
- School board: CG
- Authority: Ministry of Education, Government of Chhattisgarh
- Enrollment: 2,36,405 (31 January 2023)
- Website: cgschool.in/Saems/SAEMSIndex.aspx

Swami Atmanand English Medium School (SAGES) is a chain of English-medium schools established by the Government of Chhattisgarh. The schools are fully funded by the Department of School Education, Government of Chhattisgarh. Education is provided free of cost up to grade 8, with a nominal fee applicable from grade 9 to grade 12.

== History ==
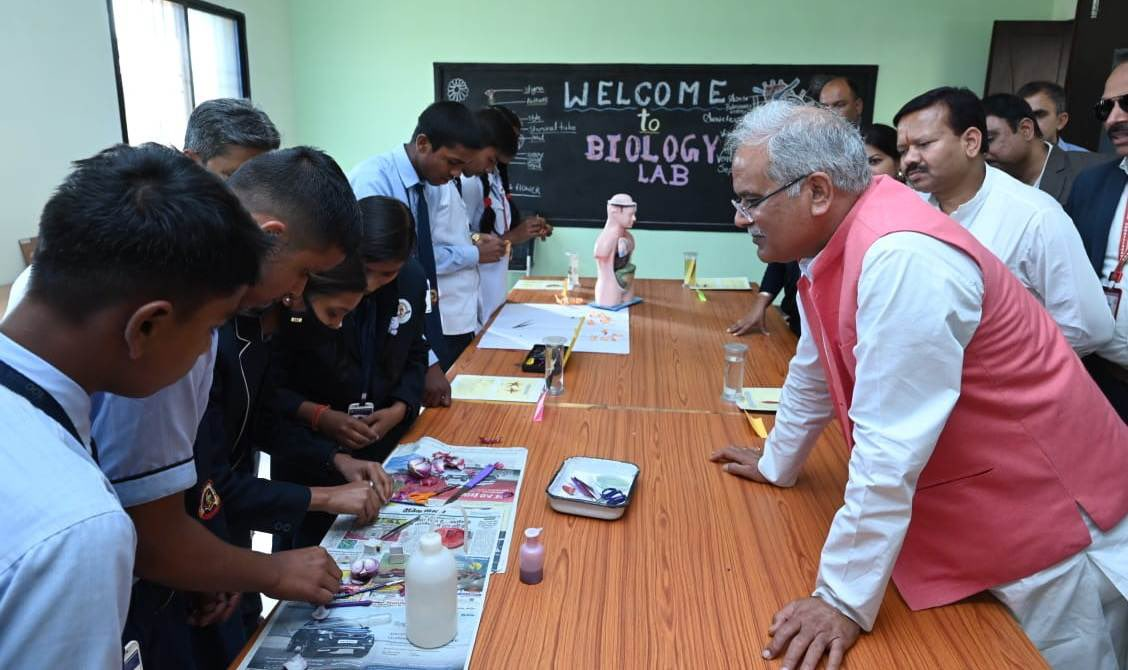
Chief Minister Bhupesh Baghel with students of Swami Atmanand School in Jamgaon, Patan.

The Swami Atmanand English Medium School Scheme was inaugurated on November 1, 2020, by Chief Minister Bhupesh Baghel of Chhattisgarh, on the occasion of Statehood Day, in honor of Swami Atmanand, who dedicated his life to serving the tribal people and promoting compassion and service. As of November 2022, there are 279 Swami Atmanand schools in Chhattisgarh.

== Expansion ==
The Chhattisgarh government has decided to open additional schools across the state. Chief Minister Bhupesh Baghel has also announced plans to establish English-medium government colleges in various cities to promote higher education. In February 2022, he said 32 more Hindi medium schools will be opened.

== See also ==
- Jawahar Navodaya Vidyalaya
- Odisha Adarsha Vidyalaya
- Kendriya Vidyalaya
