= Vermiponics =

Soil-less growing technique

Vermiponics is a soil-less growing technique that combines hydroponics with vermiculture by utilizing diluted wormbin leachate ("worm tea") as the nutrient solution as opposed to the use of fish waste (as used in aquaponics) or the addition of manufactured chemicals to provide the nutrients.

In 2008, Saginaw Valley State University in Michigan was using vermiponics as part of its efforts to reduce waste. Aquaponics growers have noted previously that redworms can be added to aquaponic grow beds successfully and serve useful functions in aquaponic systems. This has led several people to experiment with nutrient solutions that are based on wormbin leachate alone, for instance in a Central Queensland University trial. The effectiveness of vermiponics compared to hydroponics and aquaponics has not been thoroughly studied. However, a paper from the University of Arizona has found that using wormtea has beneficial effects on root protrusion in lettuce seedlings when compared to inorganic fertilizer.

As hydroponics is based on feeding plants inorganic fertilizer and as many aquaponic growers use commercial fish feed, it has been suggested that vermiponics is a more sustainable method of food production as worm castings can be used from local food waste rather than mined fertilizer or sea caught fish.
