= Worm cast =

Structure created by worms, typically on soils such as those on beaches

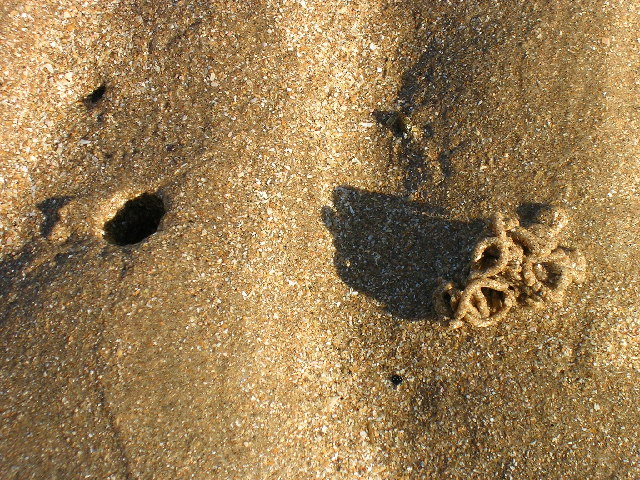
Lugworm cast, Red Wharf Bay, Isle of Anglesey

A worm cast is a structure created by worms, typically on soils or sand such as those found on beaches. They are formed when worms process sediment while burrowing and expel the material at the surface, producing small piles, coils, or pellets of sand or soil. Worm casts often appear as small mounds that may resemble multiple worms emerging from the ground. The presence of worm casts can indicate the location of one or more worms beneath the surface.

== Formation ==
Worm casts are produced as a by-product of the feeding and burrowing activity of worms. Many worms ingest soil or sediment containing organic matter and microorganisms. During digestion, mineral particles are mechanically fragmented and organic material is partially decomposed. The processed material is expelled at the surface through the worm’s burrow, forming characteristic mounds or coils of sediment.

In marine and coastal environments, casts are commonly produced by burrowing polychaete worms living in sandy sediments. These casts may appear as coiled or spaghetti-like structures on beaches or tidal flats.

== Occurrence ==
Worm casts occur in a variety of environments where burrowing worms live, including:

- Sandy beaches and intertidal zones, where marine worms inhabit sediments.
- Agricultural soils and natural grasslands.
- Lawns and turfgrass systems in residential landscapes and parks.

In beach environments, casts are often visible at low tide and may be used to locate the burrows of marine worms beneath the sand.

== Ecological significance ==
In terrestrial soils such as lawns and grasslands, worm casts produced by earthworms are often considered indicators of biologically active and healthy soil. Earthworm activity improves soil aeration, water infiltration, and nutrient cycling by transporting organic matter and mineral particles through the soil profile.

Worm casts often contain higher concentrations of plant-available nutrients than surrounding soil and contribute to improved soil structure by forming stable soil aggregates.

== Historical study ==
The role of earthworms in soil formation was extensively studied by Charles Darwin, who described their impact on soil processes in his 1881 book The Formation of Vegetable Mould Through the Action of Worms.

== See also ==
- Earthworm
- Polychaete
- Soil structure
- Vermicompost
- Soil biology
