= Rajiv Gandhi Kisan Nyay Yojana =

India welfare initiative

Rajiv Gandhi Kisan Nyay Yojana (RGKNY)
- Motto: Kisan ki Unnati Rajya ki Pragati
- Type of project: Economic
- Country: India
- Chief Minister: Bhupesh Baghel
- Launched: 21 May 2020; 6 years ago
- Status: Active
- Website: rgkny.cg.nic.in

In the state budget presented by the Chhattisgarh government in India, a provision of Rs 5700 crore was made for the welfare of farmers through which Rajiv Gandhi Kisan Nyay Yojana was launched on 21 May 2020, the martyrdom day of former Prime Minister Rajiv Gandhi.

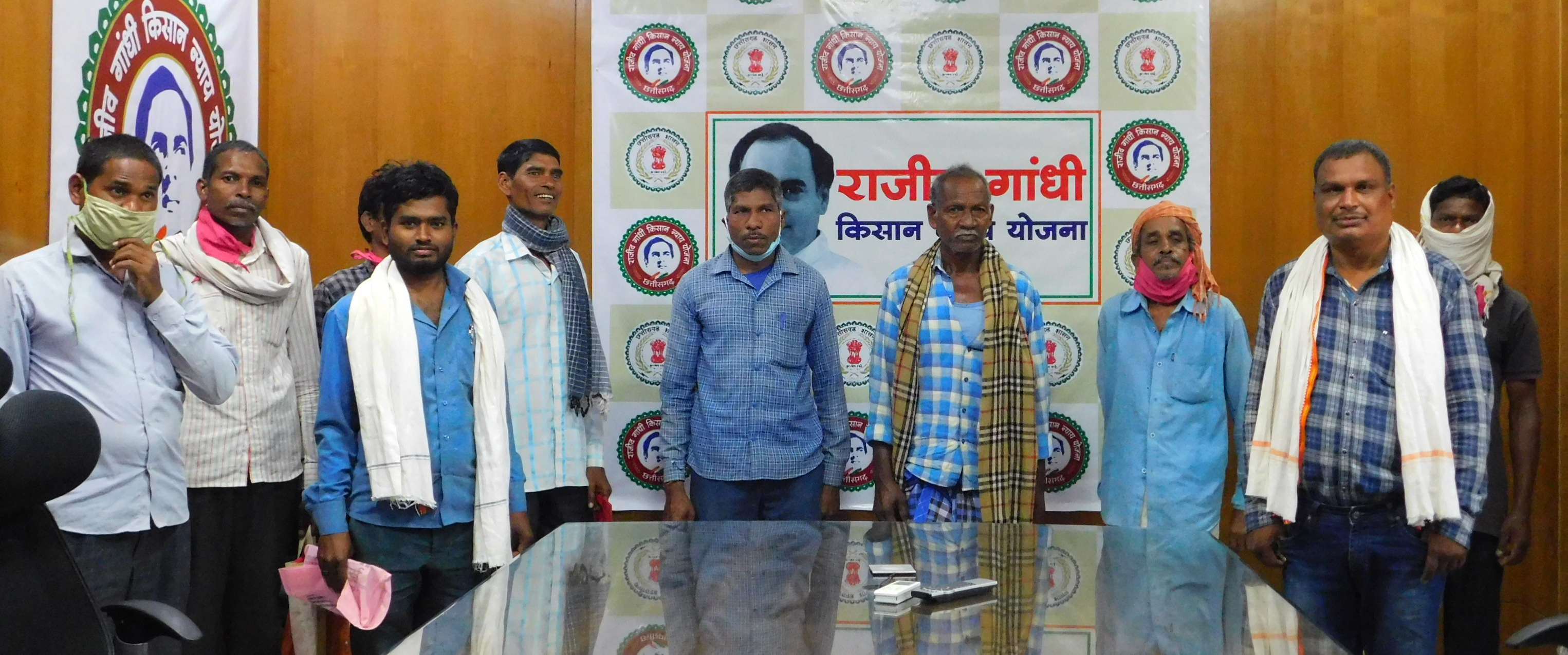
Beneficiary farmers of Rajiv Gandhi Kisan Nyay Yojana

In Chhattisgarh, the total cultivable land area is 46.77 lakh hectares. 70% population of the state is engaged in agriculture and around 37.46 Lakh are farm families. The objective of this scheme is to encourage crop production and increase agricultural acreage. The amount of Rs. 5750 crores provided under the scheme was transferred to the farmers' accounts in four installments. 19 lakh farmers in the state are benefiting from this scheme. Paddy, maize and sugarcane (Rabi) crops were included in the initial year of the plan. In the year 2020–21, it has also been decided to include pulses and oilseed crops. The government of Chhattisgarh has also decided to include the landless agricultural laborers of the state in the second phase of the Rajiv Gandhi Kisan Nyay Yojana.

On 17 October 2022, Farmers received Rs 1745 crore to prepare for the upcoming Kharif season under this scheme. Amount as input subsidy transferred directly into the bank accounts of 23.99 lakh farmers in the state. This includes those farmers who take paddy, the main crop of the Kharif season, other Kharif crops, those who take other crops instead of paddy and the farmers who plant trees.

== Objectives of scheme ==
Rajiv Gandhi Kisan Nyay Yojana was started by the Chhattisgarh government led by Bhupesh Baghel with the objective of encouraging the farmers of Chhattisgarh for crop production and increasing the agricultural area.

- Easy and convenient registration of farmers,
- Farmers have to register for various schemes only once,
- Ease of implementation, management and supervision of schemes,
- Accurate and quick data acquisition and
- Maintaining the original beneficiary's interests and avoiding beneficiary duplication.
