= List of State Protected Monuments in Chhattisgarh =

This is a list of State Protected Monuments as officially reported by and available through the website of the Archaeological Survey of India (ASI) in the Indian state Chhattisgarh. The monument identifier is a combination of the abbreviation of the subdivision of the list (state, ASI circle) and the numbering as published on the website of the ASI. 58 State Protected Monuments have been recognized by the ASI in Chhattisgarh. Besides the State Protected Monuments, also the Monuments of National Importance in this state might be relevant.

Government of Chhattisgarh under Directorate of Culture and Archaeology has listed the State Protected Monuments on its site with a short description and an image.

== List of state protected monuments ==
SL. No.	Description	Location	Address	District	Coordinates	Image
S-CT-1	Gudiyari Temple	Kesharpal		Bastar	19°23′15″N 81°54′06″E	Gudiyari Temple
S-CT-2	Shiva Temple	Singhaigudi		Bastar	19°12′08″N 81°42′10″E	Shiva Temple
S-CT-3	Ancient Brick Mounds	Garh Dhanora		Kondagaon	20°04′20″N 81°33′18″E	Upload Photo
S-CT-4	Buddha's Statue at Ancient mound	Bhongapal		Kondagaon	19°49′49″N 81°23′47″E	Upload Photo
S-CT-5	Shiva Temple	Gumadpal		Bastar	18°53′45″N 81°46′17″E	Shiva Temple
S-CT-6	Shiva Temple	Chhindgaon		Bastar	19°10′27″N 81°48′12″E	Upload Photo
S-CT-7	Mahamaya Temple	Ratanpur		Bilaspur	22°17′18″N 82°09′36″E	Mahamaya Temple
S-CT-8	Ancient Shiva Temple	Kirari Godhi		Bilaspur	21°55′33″N 82°05′08″E	Ancient Shiva Temple
S-CT-9	Devrai-jaithani Temple(Tala)	Tala		Bilaspur	21°54′26″N 82°01′34″E	Devrai-jaithani Temple(Tala)
S-CT-10	Dhumnath Temple	Sargaon		Mungeli	21°54′04″N 81°58′32″E	Dhumnath Temple
S-CT-11	Shiva Temple	Ganiyari		Bilaspur	22°11′31″N 82°02′37″E	Shiva Temple
S-CT-12	Battisa temple	Barsur		Dantewara	19°08′06″N 81°22′56″E	Battisa temple
S-CT-13	Karneshwar Mahadev Group of Temple	Chhipalip		Dhamtari	20°18′56″N 81°55′39″E	Karneshwar Mahadev Group of Temple
S-CT-14	Nagdev Temple	Nagpura		Durg	21°14′41″N 81°14′07″E	Upload Photo
S-CT-15	Bahadur Kalarin's Machi	Nawapara		Balod	20°42′29″N 81°20′12″E	Bahadur Kalarin's Machi
S-CT-16	Vishnu Temple	Banbarad		Durg	21°20′15″N 81°23′18″E	Upload Photo
S-CT-17	Shiva Temple	Nagpura		Durg	21°14′48″N 81°13′58″E	Upload Photo
S-CT-18	Megalithic Monument	Dhanora		Balod	20°41′27″N 81°21′56″E	Upload Photo
S-CT-19	Megalithic Monument	Kuliya		Balod	20°40′38″N 81°26′31″E	Upload Photo
S-CT-20	Ghughusraja Temple	Deokar		Bemetara	21°34′06″N 81°19′02″E	Ghughusraja Temple
S-CT-21	Madhiyapat Temple (Ruined Temple)	Dondilohara		Balod		Upload Photo
S-CT-22	Kapileswar Shiva Temple Group and Baori	Balod		Balod	20°44′16″N 81°12′39″E	Kapileswar Shiva Temple Group and Baori
S-CT-23	Shiva Temple	Sahaspur		Bemetara	21°32′08″N 81°17′35″E	Shiva Temple
S-CT-24	Kukurdev Temple	Khapri		Balod	20°45′56″N 81°08′55″E	Kukurdev Temple
S-CT-25	Megalithic Monument at Karahibhadar	Karahibhadar		Balod	20°41′35″N 81°19′32″E	Upload Photo
S-CT-26	Megalithic Monument at Karakabhat	Karakabhat		Balod	20°41′40″N 81°19′29″E	Upload Photo
S-CT-27	Megalithic Monument at Mujgahan	Mujgahan		Balod	20°42′14″N 81°19′13″E	Upload Photo
S-CT-28	Shiva Temple Chaturbhuji Temple	Dhamdha		Durg	21°27′26″N 81°19′48″E	Shiva Temple Chaturbhuji Temple
S-CT-29	Ancient Brick Temple	Dondilohara		Balod		Upload Photo
S-CT-30	Shiva Temple	Palari		Balod	20°47′53″N 81°28′38″E	Upload Photo
S-CT-31	Shiva Temple	Jagannathpur		Balod	20°47′28″N 81°11′59″E	Upload Photo
S-CT-32	Lakshamaneswar Temple	Kharod		Jaanjagir-Champa	21°44′46″N 82°34′31″E	Lakshamaneswar Temple
S-CT-33	Bhoramdev Temple	Kawardha		Kabirdham	22°06′55″N 81°08′53″E	Bhoramdev Temple
S-CT-34	Cherki Mahal	Kawardha		Kabirdham	22°06′33″N 81°08′55″E	Upload Photo
S-CT-35	Mandava Mahal	Kawardha		Kabirdham	22°06′33″N 81°09′15″E	Mandava Mahal
S-CT-36	Bajarangbali Temple	Sahaspur		Bemetara	21°32′07″N 81°17′36″E	Bajarangbali Temple
S-CT-37	Grave of three kabir panthi's	Kudurmal		Korba	22°16′46″N 82°41′47″E	Upload Photo
S-CT-38	Anand Prabhu Kuti Bihar	Sirpur		Mahasamund	21°20′26″N 82°10′59″E	Upload Photo
S-CT-39	Swastik Vihar	Sirpur		Mahasamund	21°20′30″N 82°10′53″E	Upload Photo
S-CT-40	Jaganath Temple	Khallari		Mahasamund	21°05′41″N 82°17′08″E	Jaganath Temple
S-CT-41	Singhanpur Cave Rockshelter	Naharpali		Raigarh	21°59′44″N 83°15′05″E	Upload Photo
S-CT-42	Kuleshwar Temple	Rajim		Gariaband	20°57′43″N 81°52′18″E	Kuleshwar Temple
S-CT-43	Shiva Temple	Chandkhuri		Raipur	21°19′11″N 81°49′05″E	Shiva Temple
S-CT-44	Siddheshwar Temple	Palari		Baloda Bazar - Bhatapara	21°32′05″N 82°10′39″E	Siddheshwar Temple
S-CT-45	Chitawari Devi Temple	Dhobani		Baloda Bazar - Bhatapara	21°41′49″N 81°45′07″E	Chitawari Devi Temple
S-CT-46	Mauli Devi Temple	Tarponga		Baloda Bazar - Bhatapara	21°45′44″N 81°47′18″E	Upload Photo
S-CT-47	Ancient Brick Temple	Nawagaon		Raipur	21°13′17″N 81°48′44″E	Ancient Brick Temple
S-CT-48	Shiv Mandir & Mahamaya Devi Temple	Damru		Baloda Bazar - Bhatapara	21°43′18″N 82°15′24″E	Upload Photo
S-CT-49	Phanikeshwar Mahadev Temple	Fingeshwar		Gariaband	20°58′16″N 82°02′31″E	Phanikeshwar Mahadev Temple
S-CT-50	Shiva Temple	Giraud		Raipur	21°20′50″N 81°39′16″E	Upload Photo
S-CT-51	Shiva Temple	Ghatiyari		Khairagarh-Chhuikhadan-Gandai	21°40′40″N 81°03′33″E	Shiva Temple
S-CT-52	Ruined Temple(Near Shala Bhavan)	Dipadih		Balrampur-Ramanujganj	23°18′09″N 83°43′29″E	Ruined Temple(Near Shala Bhavan)
S-CT-53	Shiva Temple	Devtikra		Sarguja	23°01′06″N 82°56′57″E	Shiva Temple
S-CT-54	Deur Temple	Maharanipur		Sarguja	22°44′00″N 83°27′15″E	Upload Photo
S-CT-55	Ruined Temple (Near Rani Talab)	Dipadih		Balrampur-Ramanujganj	23°18′16″N 83°43′27″E	Ruined Temple (Near Rani Talab)
S-CT-56	Devi Temple (Cherika Deur)			Sarguja	23°01′09″N 82°56′39″E	Devi Temple (Cherika Deur)
S-CT-57	Group of Satmahala Temples	Bhadwahi		Sarguja	23°01′09″N 82°55′27″E	Group of Satmahala Temples
S-CT-58	Shiva Temple	Harratoli		Balrampur-Ramanujganj	23°19′24″N 83°36′35″E	Shiva Temple

NOTE: For all the Monuments whose coordinates are listed above; Images posted by visitors are available on Google Map.

== See also ==
- List of Monuments of National Importance in Chhattisgarh
- List of State Protected Monuments in India
- List of State Protected Monuments in Madhya Pradesh
