= Kasdol Assembly constituency =

Legislative Assembly constituency in Chhattisgarh State, India

Coordinates: 21.62°N 82.42°E

Kasdol
- Constituency No. 44 for the Chhattisgarh Legislative Assembly

Constituency details
- Country: India
- Region: Central India
- State: Chhattisgarh
- District: Baloda Bazar
- Lok Sabha constituency: Janjgir-Champa
- Established: 2003
- Total electors: 361,750
- Reservation: None

Member of Legislative Assembly
- 6th Chhattisgarh Legislative Assembly
- Incumbent Sandeep Sahu
- Party: Indian National Congress
- Elected year: 2023
- Preceded by: Shakuntala Sahu

Kasdol is one of the 90 Legislative Assembly constituencies of Chhattisgarh state in India.

It comprises Palari tehsil and parts of Kasdol and Balodabazar tehsil, all in Baloda Bazar district.

== Members of the Legislative Assembly ==
Election	Name	Party
Madhya Pradesh Legislative Assembly
Prior to 1961: Constituency did not exist
1962	Bhupendra Nath	Indian National Congress
1967	Kanhaiya Lal Sharma	Indian National Congress
1972	Kanhaiya Lal Sharma	Indian National Congress
1977	Dhani Ram Sahu	Janata Party
1980	Kanhaiya Lal Sharma	Indian National Congress
1985	Kanhaiya Lal Sharma	Indian National Congress
1990	Aruna Kumar	Janata Dal
1993	Kanahaiya Lal Sharma	Independent politician
1998	Gaurishankar Agrawal	Bharatiya Janata Party
Chhattisgarh Legislative Assembly
2003	Rajkamal Singhania	Indian National Congress
2008	Rajkamal Singhania	Indian National Congress
2013	Gaurishankar Agrawal	Bharatiya Janata Party
2018	Shakuntala Sahu	Indian National Congress
2023	Sandeep Sahu	Indian National Congress

== Election results ==
=== 2023 ===
Chhattisgarh Legislative Assembly Election, 2023: Basna
Party	Candidate	Votes	%	±%
INC	Sandeep Sahu	136,362	50.21	+1.07
BJP	Dhani Ram Dhiwar	102,597	37.78	+8.24
BSP	D.D. Bartamsi	6,319	2.33	−1.54
Independent	Gore Lal Sahu	5,395	1.99	
Independent	Manoj Kumar Adil	4,926	1.81	
Independent	Prit Lal Kurre	3,132	1.15	
NOTA	None of the Above	831	0.31	−0.33
Majority		33,765	12.43	−7.17
Turnout		271,558	75.07	+0.94
INC hold		Swing		

=== 2018 ===
Chhattisgarh Legislative Assembly Election, 2018: Kasdol
Party	Candidate	Votes	%	±%
INC	Shakuntala Sahu	121,422	49.14	
BJP	Gaurishankar Agrawal	73,004	29.54	
JCC	Parameshwar Yadu	18,170	7.35	
BSP	Rameshwar Prasad Kaiwart	9,558	3.87	
Independent	Jagjeewan Kumar Narange	3,917	1.59	
NOTA	None of the Above	1,588	0.64	
Majority		48,418	19.60	
Turnout		247,115	74.13	
INC gain from BJP		Swing		

== See also ==
- List of constituencies of the Chhattisgarh Legislative Assembly
- Baloda Bazar district
