= Shakuntala Sahu =

Indian politician (born 1964)

Member of Chhattisgarh Legislative Assembly
- In office 2018–2023
- Preceded by: Gaurishankar Agrawal
- Succeeded by: Sandeep Sahu
- Constituency: Kasdol

Personal details
- Party: Indian National Congress
- Profession: Politician

Shakuntala Sahu (born 1964) is an Indian politician from Chhattisgarh. She was an MLA from Kasdol Assembly constituency in Baloda Bazar district. She won the 2018 Chhattisgarh Legislative Assembly election, representing the Indian National Congress.

== Early life and education ==
Sahu is from Kasdol, Baloda Bazar district, Chhattisgarh. She completed her graduation in arts in 1987 at a college affiliated with Pandit Ravishanker Shukla University, Raipur.

== Career ==
Sahu won from Kasdol Assembly constituency representing the Indian National Congress in the 2018 Chhattisgarh Legislative Assembly election. She polled 121,422 votes and defeated her nearest rival, Gaurishankar Agrawal of Bharatiya Janata Party, by a margin of 48,418 votes.
