= Baloda Bazar =

- Municipal council
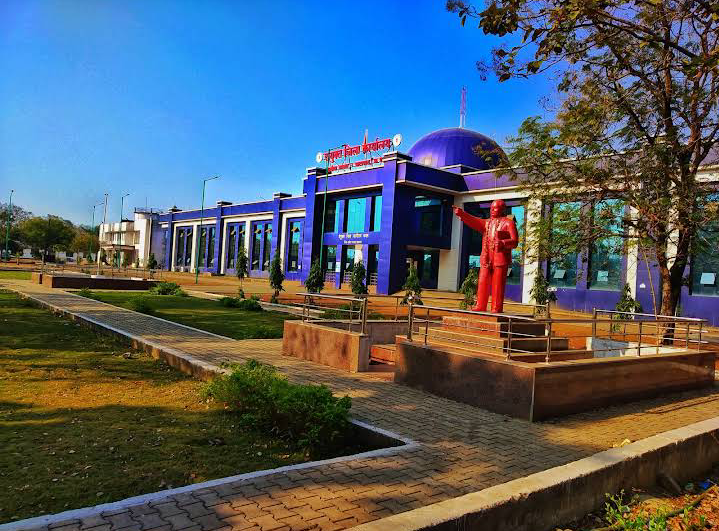
- Collector Office Baloda
- Nickname: Baloda
- Location in Chhattisgarh, India Baloda Bazar (India)
- Coordinates: 21°39′25.16″N 82°9′39.824″E
- India: India
- State: Chhattisgarh
- District: Baloda Bazar-Bhatapara
- Elevation: 254 m (833 ft)

Population (2001)
  - Total: 30,000

Languages
  - Official: Hindi, Chhattisgarhi
- Time zone: UTC+5:30 (IST)
- PIN: 493332 (Baloda Bazar)
- Vehicle registration: CG-22
- Website: balodabazar.gov.in

Baloda Bazar is a nagar palika parishad in Baloda Bazar district in the Indian state of Chhattisgarh. On 15 August 2011, it was declared a district. Baloda Bazar is a large producer of cement, as there are many cement plants including Ambuja Cements, Rawan Cement Works, Nuvoco Cement Sonadih, Nu Vista Cement Risda, Shree Cement Khapradih, UltraTech Cement Hirmi, UltraTech Cement Rawan, and Ultratech Cement Kukurdih. The geographical location of Baloda Bazar town is situated between 21.300 54′ to 31.450 14′ north latitude and 42.020 17′ to 82.290 07′ east longitude at an altitude of 270 m above sea level. The boundary of Baloda Bazar district situated in Raipur division touches Bemetara, Mungeli, Bilaspur, Janjgir, Sarangarh – Bilaigarh, Mahasamund and Raipur districts. According to the popular legend regarding the naming of Baloda Bazar, earlier traders from states like Gujarat, Haryana, Maharashtra, Orissa, Berar etc. used to gather in the Bhainsa Pasara of the town to buy and sell bulls and buffaloes (Boda). As a result of which its name became popular as Balboda Bazar, and later on it became Baloda Bazar.

== History ==
From 1854 to 1864, during the British Raj, Baloda Bazar was incorporated within the Raipur district. Subsequently, in 1864, the region was transferred to the Bilaspur district. Due to administrative challenges, British officials elevated the status of Baloda Bazar to that of a district in 1903, relocating the Tehsil headquarters from Simga to Baloda Bazar. Since then, the development blocks of Simga, Bhatapara, Baloda Bazar, Palari, Kasdol, and Bilaigarh have been included within its jurisdiction. In 1982, these areas were designated as separate tehsils. From an administrative perspective, the British established a rest house, church, hospital, and residence in the village of Parsabhader (mission), located 2 kilometres from Baloda Bazar. In 1920, the Panchayat was instituted in Baloda Bazar following the implementation of the Sanitation Act. Following independence, Baloda Bazar was designated as a Gram Panchayat under the Local Government Act in 1949. In 1973, Baloda Bazar was given the status of a Municipality.

== Geography ==
Baloda Bazar is located at 30.67°N 82.17°E. It has an average elevation of 254 m (833 ft). There are several tourist places in Baloda Bazar like Sirpur, Turturia, Giroudpuri, Siddheswr Mandir Pallari, and many more.

== Education ==
The town has two government colleges, one polytechnic college, a government-run high school and over 50 private educational institutions. Some of the prominent schools are Ambuja Vidya Peeth, Sacred Heart Convent School, Vardhman Vidya Peeth, Gurukul English Medium School, Tata DAV Public School, and Bangur Public School. There are no engineering colleges at present. Government Pandit Chakrapani Shukla Multipurpose Higher Secondary School, formally known as Government High School, was the main high school of the region, established in the year 1948.

== Demographics ==
As of the 2001 Indian census, Baloda Bazar had a population of 27,853. Males constitute 51% of the population and females 49%. Baloda Bazar has an average literacy rate of 69%, higher than the national average of 59.5%; with 57% of the males and 43% of females literate. 14% of the population is under 6 years of age.

== Economy ==
There is an abundance of cement plants, in which there are international plants established in the district such as Ultratech in Gram Hirmi and Ravan, Ambuja in Ravan, Lafarge in Sonadih and Emami in Risda. Other products, including rice, are exported abroad, as well as power, brass and other small and medium industries.
