= Sandeep Sahu =

Indian politician (born 1979)

Sandeep Sahu (born 1979) is an Indian politician from Chhattisgarh. He is an MLA from Kasdol Assembly constituency in Baloda Bazar District. He won the 2023 Chhattisgarh Legislative Assembly election, as a candidate of the Indian National Congress.

== Early life and education ==
Sahu is from Kasdol, Baloda Bazar District, Chhattisgarh. He is the son of Shyamlal Sahu. He completed his M.B.A. in 2017 at Kalinga University, Raipur.

== Career ==
Sahu won from Kasdol Assembly constituency representing the Indian National Congress in the 2023 Chhattisgarh Legislative Assembly election. He polled 136,362 votes and defeated his nearest rival, Dhaniram Dhivar of the Bharatiya Janata Party, by a margin of 33,765 votes.
