= Chhattisgarh ke Bheem Chintaram =

Indian documentary film

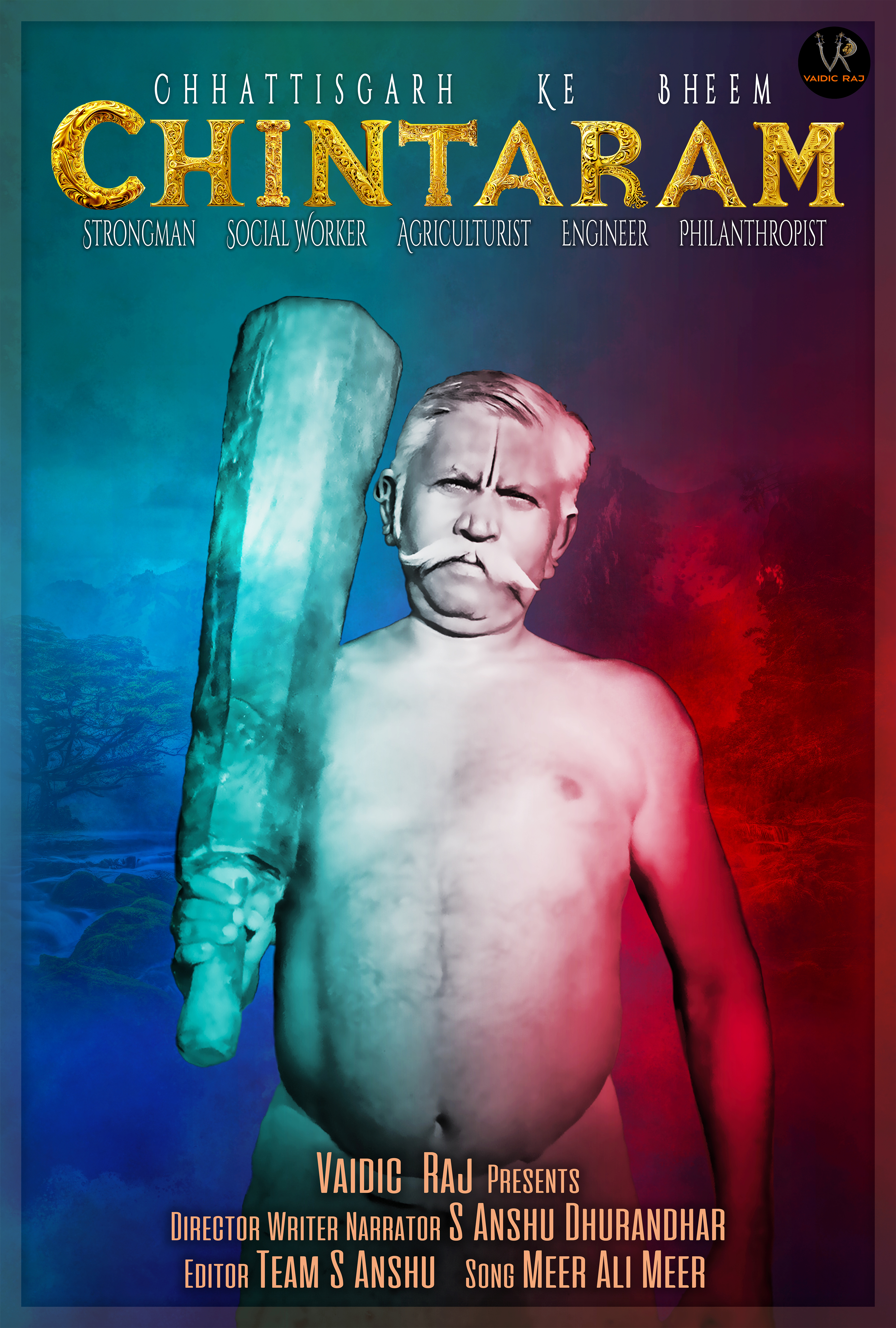
- Poster
- Directed by: S Anshu Dhurandhar
- Narrated by: S Anshu Dhurandhar
- Music by: Meer Ali Meer
- Release date: 6 January 2025
- Running time: 85 minutes
- Country: India
- Language: Hindi

Chhattisgarh ke Bheem Chintaram (transl. Chhattisgarh’s Bheem Chintaram) is an Indian documentary film directed by S Anshu Dhurandhar. It is based on the life of Indian strongman Chintaram Tikariha. It is the first Chhattisgarhi documentary to contain interviews of over 250 people. The film features first-hand accounts by locals, Tikariha's family and interviews from public figures including chief minister of Chhattisgarh Bhupesh Baghel, cabinet minister Tank Ram Verma and member of parliament Vijay Baghel. The documentary was launched at a public event at Budgahan, Baloda Bazar on 6 January 2025.

== Production ==
The research for the documentary started in 2013 after filmmaker S Anshu Dhurandhar noticed the lack of proper documentation of a widely known local figure Chintaram Tikariha. While initially planned to be a short 20 minutes documentary the project was soon expanded to be a long form documentary due to the vastness of the source material gather during the research process. The production team travelled to over 80 locations across Chhattisgarh tracking Tikariha's life. The filming began in 2021 and lasted until late 2024.

== Synopsis ==
Chintaram is a documentary film based on the life and contributions of Chintaram Tikariha. He was born in 1880 in Kumhari, British India. From an early age, he was recognized for his extraordinary physical strength. He could lift heavy loads, carry large stone columns, and perform strenuous tasks that others struggled with. His feats of strength earned him great respect in his community, where he was often relied upon for demanding physical tasks.

Chintaram was deeply involved in community welfare. He donated his land to the government for the construction of roads and schools, ensuring better infrastructure and education for future generations. He also paid for weddings expense and covering funeral expenses for those in need, reflecting his commitment to social responsibility. Additionally, he provided employment opportunities to many, helping people sustain their livelihoods through agricultural and community-based work. Chintaram introduced the Ropa method, significantly improving agricultural productivity in Chhattisgarh. His expertise in farming and irrigation management helped farmers achieve better yields, making him an influential figure in the region.

Apart from his contributions to farming and social work, Chintaram was instrumental in reconstructing multiple temples, preserving cultural heritage in the region. One of his most significant efforts was the reconstruction of the Turturiya Temple in Balodabazar, an important religious site. His dedication to temple restoration highlighted his commitment to both spiritual and community welfare. He remained dedicated to agriculture, temple restoration, and social service until his passing on 21 November 1982. His contributions to farming, cultural preservation, and his legendary physical strength made him a well-respected figure in Chhattisgarh's history.

== Proving Chintaram ==
Proving Chintaram Poster

Proving Chintaram is a thematic segment within Chhattisgarh ke Bheem Chintaram, focusing on scientifically and physically examining Chintaram's feats of strength. The segment consists of ten structured tasks designed to assess the plausibility of these feats based on measurable standards of strength and endurance.

List of sub-segments in Proving Chintaram
No.	Title	Description	Weight/Quantity
1	Turturiya Idol	Lifting a stone idol from the historic Turturiya site.	~100 kg
2	Raw Stones	Carrying traditional raw stones used for testing strength.	95 kg
3	Atlas Stone	Lifting an atlas stone, commonly used in strength sports.	85 kg
4	Wood Log	Carrying a heavy wooden log over a set distance.	~100 kg
5	Chintaram Pillar	Lifting one side of a historical stone pillar.	~800 kg
6	The Bori	Holding a sack of weight while climbing stairs.	66 kg
7	The Gupchup	Consuming a large number of Golgappas.	>100
8	Pahalwan Thali	Eating a high-caloric meal in one sitting.	>3 kg
9	Coconut Breaking	Breaking coconuts with bare hands and knuckles.	12
10	The Mudgar	Swinging traditional Indian clubs (Mudgars).	600x

== Release and promotion ==
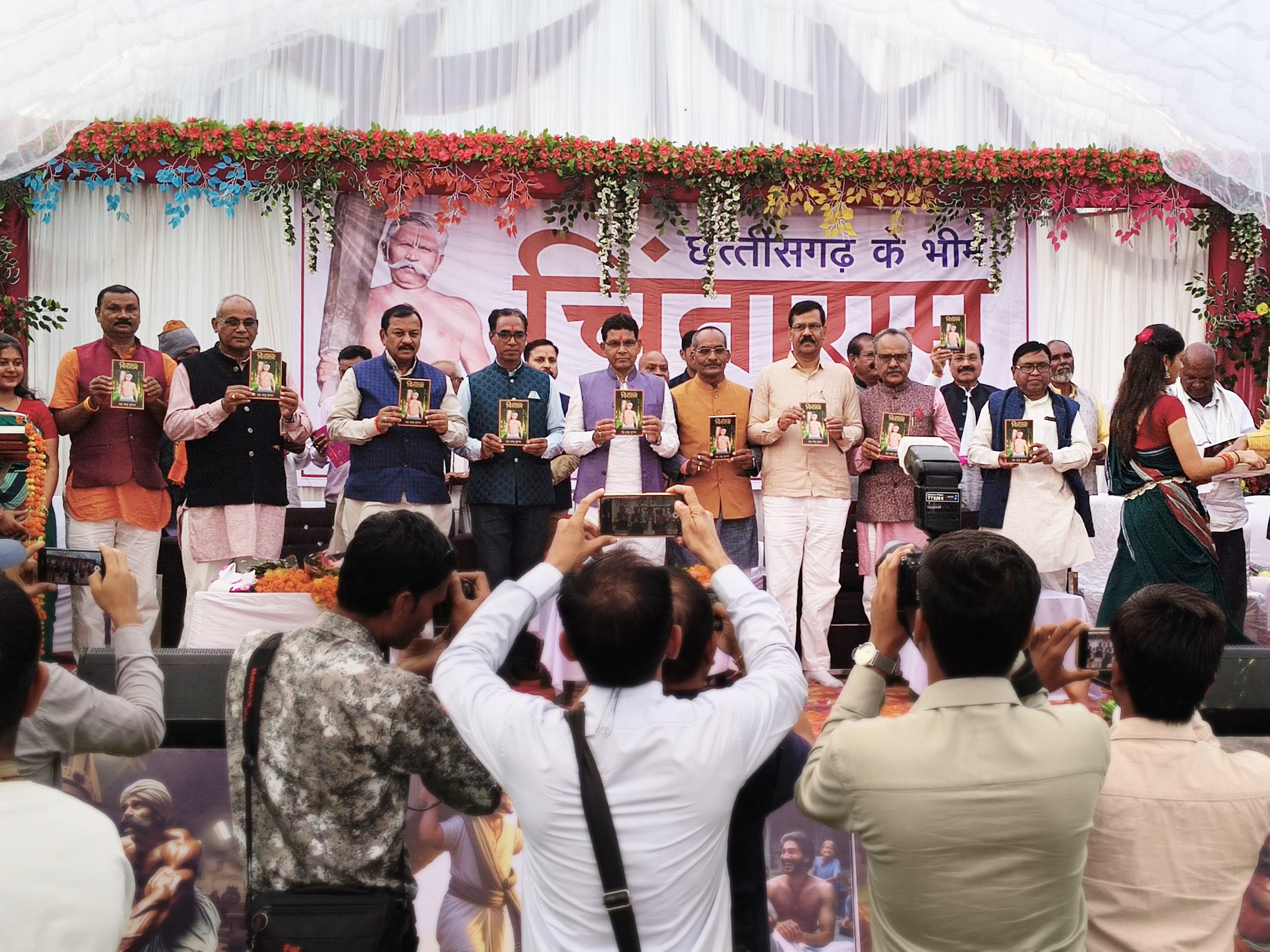
Tank Ram Verma, Vijay Baghel and Motilal Sahu at the film release event (January 6, 2025)

A public event for the film's release was held on 6 January 2025, attended by notable figures including Tank Ram Verma, Vijay Baghel, Gauri Shankar Agrawal, Motilal Sahu, Khodas Ram Kashyap(Kendreey Adhyaksha, cg Manawa Kurmi Samaj) and Shivratan Sharma(former MLA). The event featured a live recreation of Chintaram's physical feats.

The film's music composer, Meer Ali Meer, performed the film's music live. The program featured a traditional Chhattisgarhi dance performance, a special devotional presentation by ISKCON, and various native cultural acts. Additionally, a poetry recitation by artist Chowaram Verma 'Badal' was performed. The complete movie was screened to an audience of 1,000 people.

== Cast and technical staff ==
=== Interviewees ===
- Bhupesh Baghel as Self – former Chief Minister, Chhattisgarh
- Tank Ram Verma as Self – Minister of Sports and Youth Welfare, Chhattisgarh
- Vijay Baghel as self – Member of Parliament (Lok Sabha)
- Chhaya Verma as self– Member of Parliament (Rajya Sabha)
- Gaurishanker Agrawal as self – Speaker, Legislative Assembly, Chhattisgarh
- Janak Dhruw as self – Member of Chhattisgarh Legislative Assembly

=== Technical staff ===
- Editor – Arvind Verma
- Cinematography – Pramod Gilhare
- Graphic Designer – Mukul Verma
- Post Production – Vajra Vision Studio
