= Palari =

Palari may refer to:

- Palari (boat), a traditional Indonesian boat
- Palari (tribe), a Sindhi tribe in Sindh Pakistan
- Palari, Madhya Pradesh, a village in India
- Polari or palari, a form of cant slang
