= S Anshu Dhurandhar =

Indian film director, actor and writer (born 1997)

- Born: April 10, 1997 (age 29)
- Occupations: Director, Author
- Years active: 2013–present

S Anshu Dhurandhar (born 10 April 1997) is an Indian film director, actor and writer.

== Career ==
Dhurandhar made his directorial and acting debut in 2013, with the independently produced film The Kung Fu Child. His subsequent films include The Ultimate Kung Fu Child (2015) and Mahaniti (2016). His film Chhattisgarh ke Bheem Chintaram was released in 2025. In 2022, Dhurandhar published the novella Adhinayak and a biography of Indian freedom fighter Bhuruva Singh. Two years later, he published Saraswati, a biographical work on Dayanand Saraswati, the founder of the Arya Samaj, and another book based on the life of Chintaram Tikariha.
