= Madwa Mahal Temple =

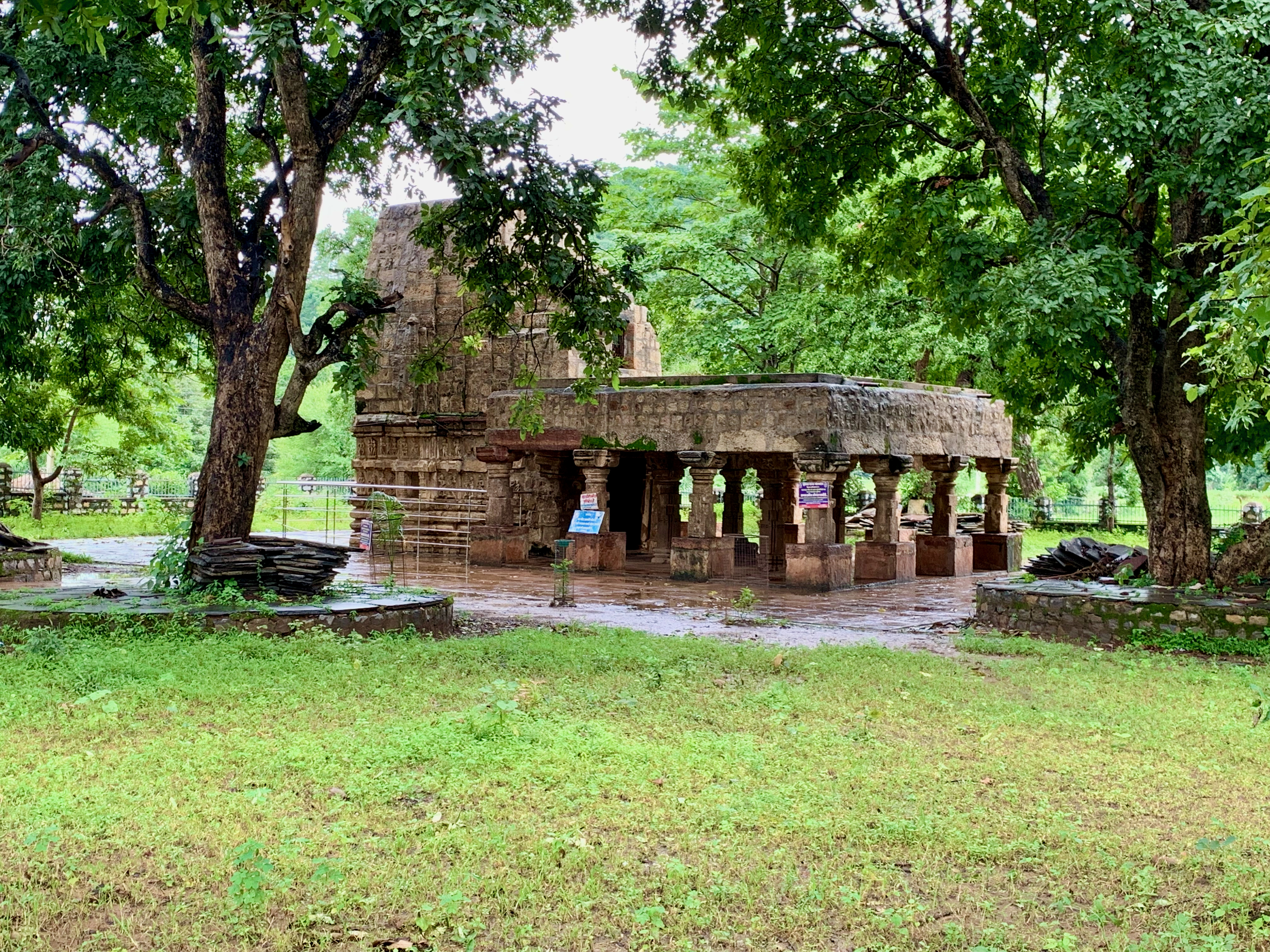

Religion
- Affiliation: Hinduism
- Deity: Shiva

Location
- Location: Chhattisgarh
- Interactive map of Madwa Mahal Temple

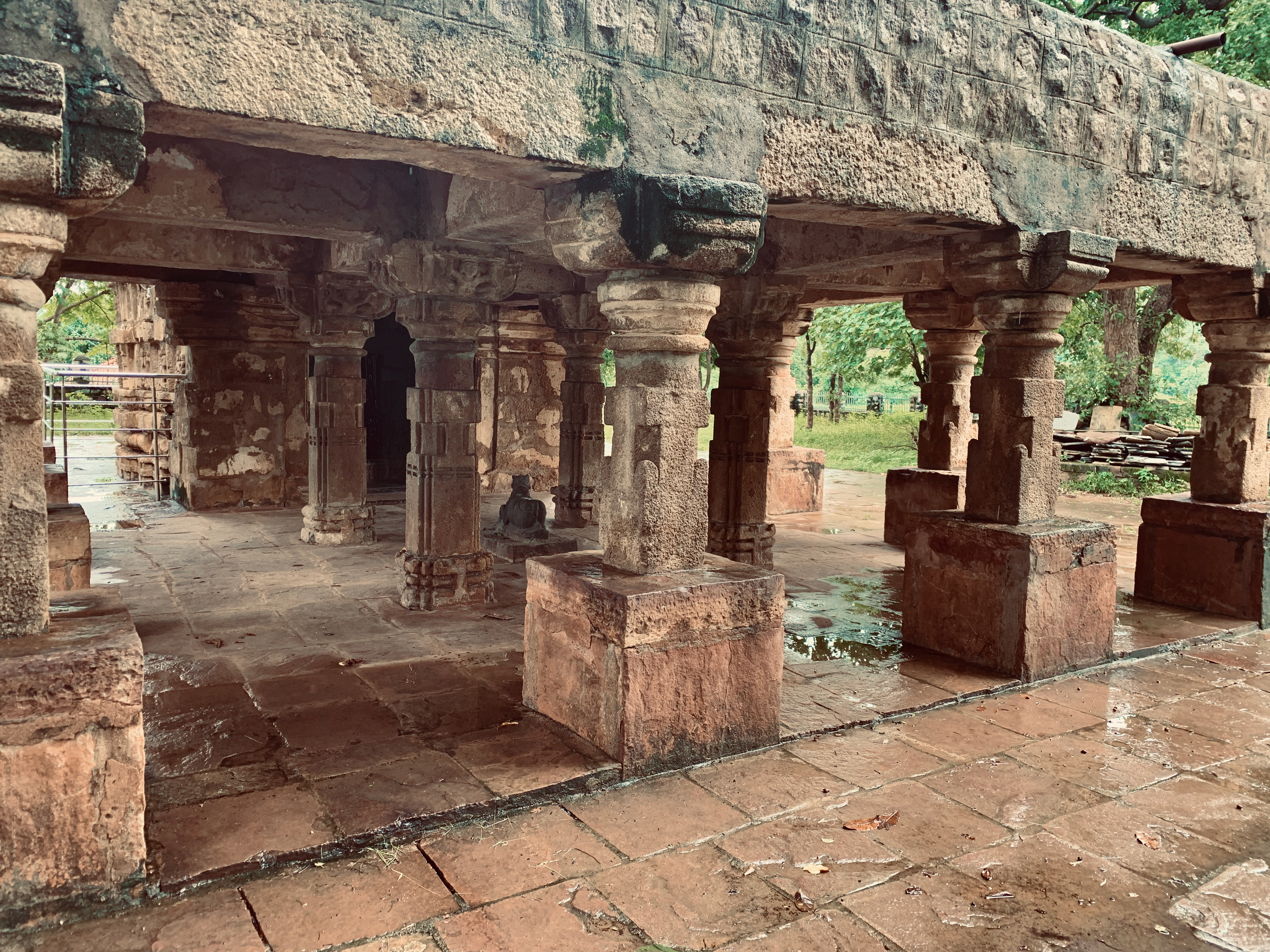
Mandapa supported on 16 pillars.

Madwa Mahal Temple is a temple in Chhattisgarh. It is located about a kilometer away from the Bhoramdeo Temple. It is dedicated to Shiva. It is a state protected monument.The temple was built by Phani Nagavanshi Gond king Ramchandra Dev.

== History ==
According to an inscription within the mandapa, the temple is dated to 1349 CE.

== Etymology ==
The original name of this temple has been lost. It is generally known as Madwa Mahal, also spelt Marwa Mahal or Mandava Mahal. This is derived from a corrupt form of mandapa, which refers to the pillared hall. The other name for the temple is Dulha Rao Temple. The word dulha means bridegroom. This alludes to the fact that the pillared hall of the temple was used for weddings. Both these names have been given by the Gond locals.

== Description ==
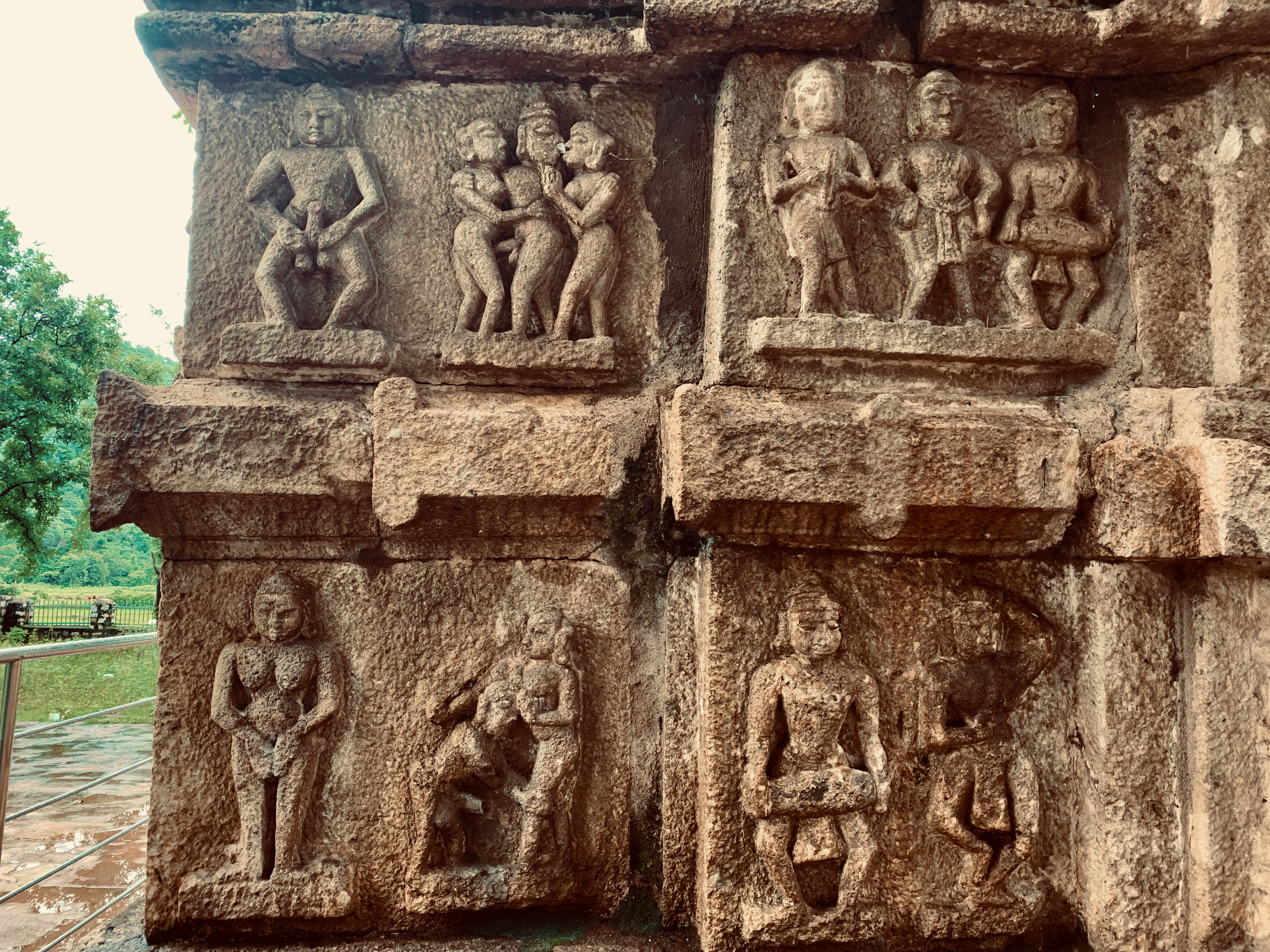
Erotic art

The temple faces west. It is built entirely out of stone.

The mandapa is 31 feet square. Four rows of square pillars support the roof of the mandapa. These pillars have no carvings but are decorated by a few plain mouldings. The sculpture of Nandi is found here.

An ante-chamber leads to the sanctum, which is 14 feet square. The temple tower is built out of granite. It contains two rows of sculptures, almost all of which are erotic. In the middle of each of the three faces of the tower is a niche, which is now empty.

== Sources ==
- Cunningham, Alexander (1884). Report Of A Tour In The Central Provinces And Lower Gangetic Doab. Vol. XVII.
