= Chintaram Tikariha =

Indian philanthropist and social worker

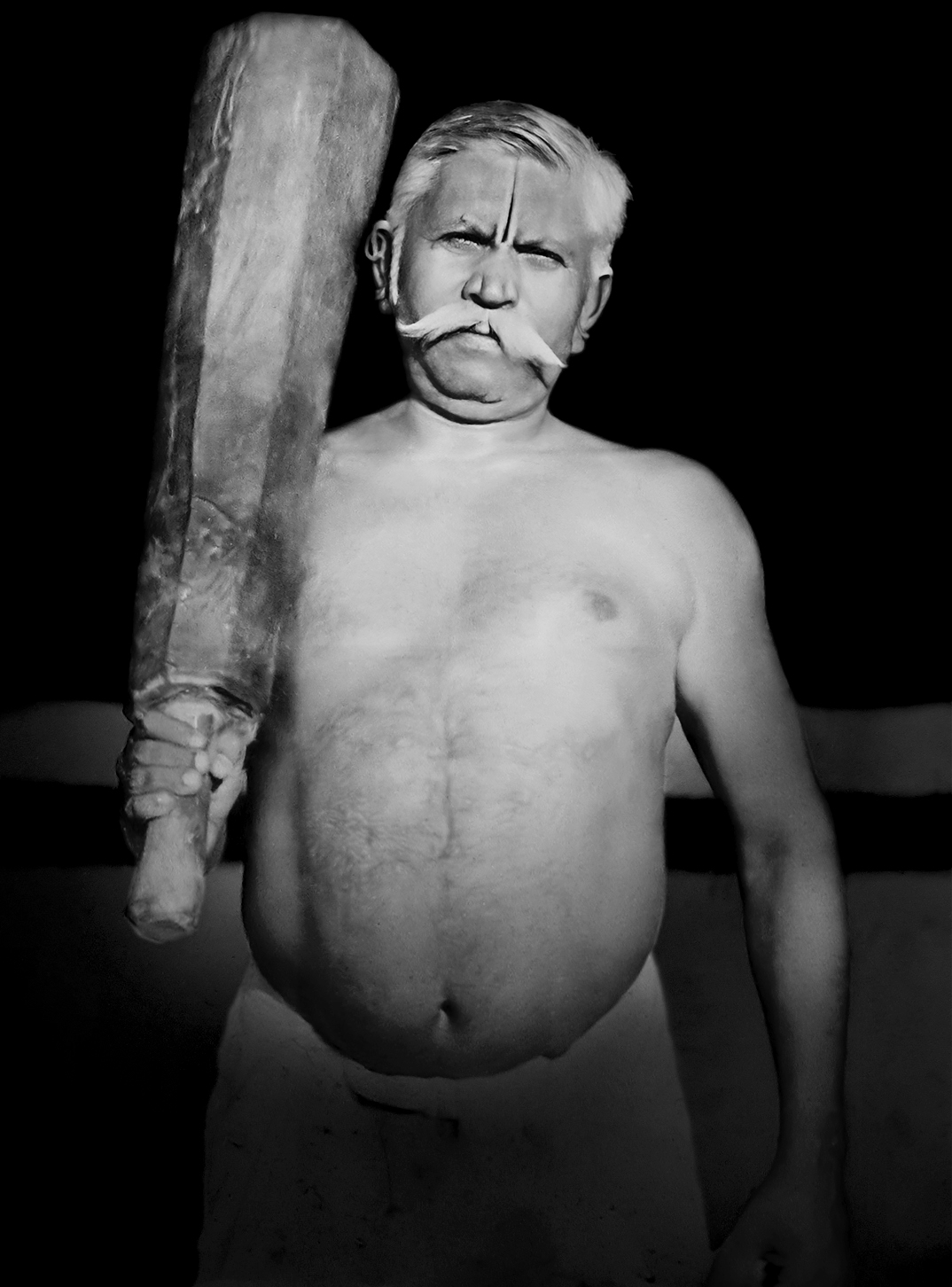
- Born: 1880; Kumhari, Central Provinces, British India
- Died: November 21, 1982 (aged 102)
- Other name: Chhattisgadh ke Bheem
- Citizenship: Indian
- Occupations: Philanthropist, Pehlwani
- Spouse(s): Victoria Bai Tikariha (m. 1910; died 1953) Shree Bai Tikariha (m. 1955)
- Children: 16 (4 Sons & 12 Daughters)
- Parent(s): Dauwaram Tikariha (father); Sukhiya Bai Tikariha (mother)

Chintaram Tikariha (1880 – 21 November 1982) was an Indian strongman, agriculturalist, philanthropist and social worker. He also donated land and money for construction of schools. He was also widely known in the local community for his numerous physical feats. He was the subject of the 2025 documentary Chhattisgarh ke Bheem Chintaram.

== Early & personal life ==
Tikariha was born in 1880 at village Kumhari, Central Provinces, British India. His father, Dauaram Tikariha, was an affluent landowner. He later moved to Budgahan, in present-day district Baloda Bazar. In early 1900s, he married Victoria Bai. They had 2 sons and 3 daughters. After the death of his first wife he married Shree Bai. The couple was survived by 2 sons and 9 daughters together.

== Agricultural reforms ==
In the mid-1900s, Tikariha, concerned by the challenges faced by agriculture in his native region, began a nationwide tour to study various agricultural practices. Accompanied by fellow former freedom fighter Salik Chandrawanshi, they traveled across India, observing and learning diverse farming techniques. His efforts contributed to the introduction of wet rice cultivation in central Chhattisgarh, which is claimed to be a significant development for the region's agricultural practices.

== Physical feats ==
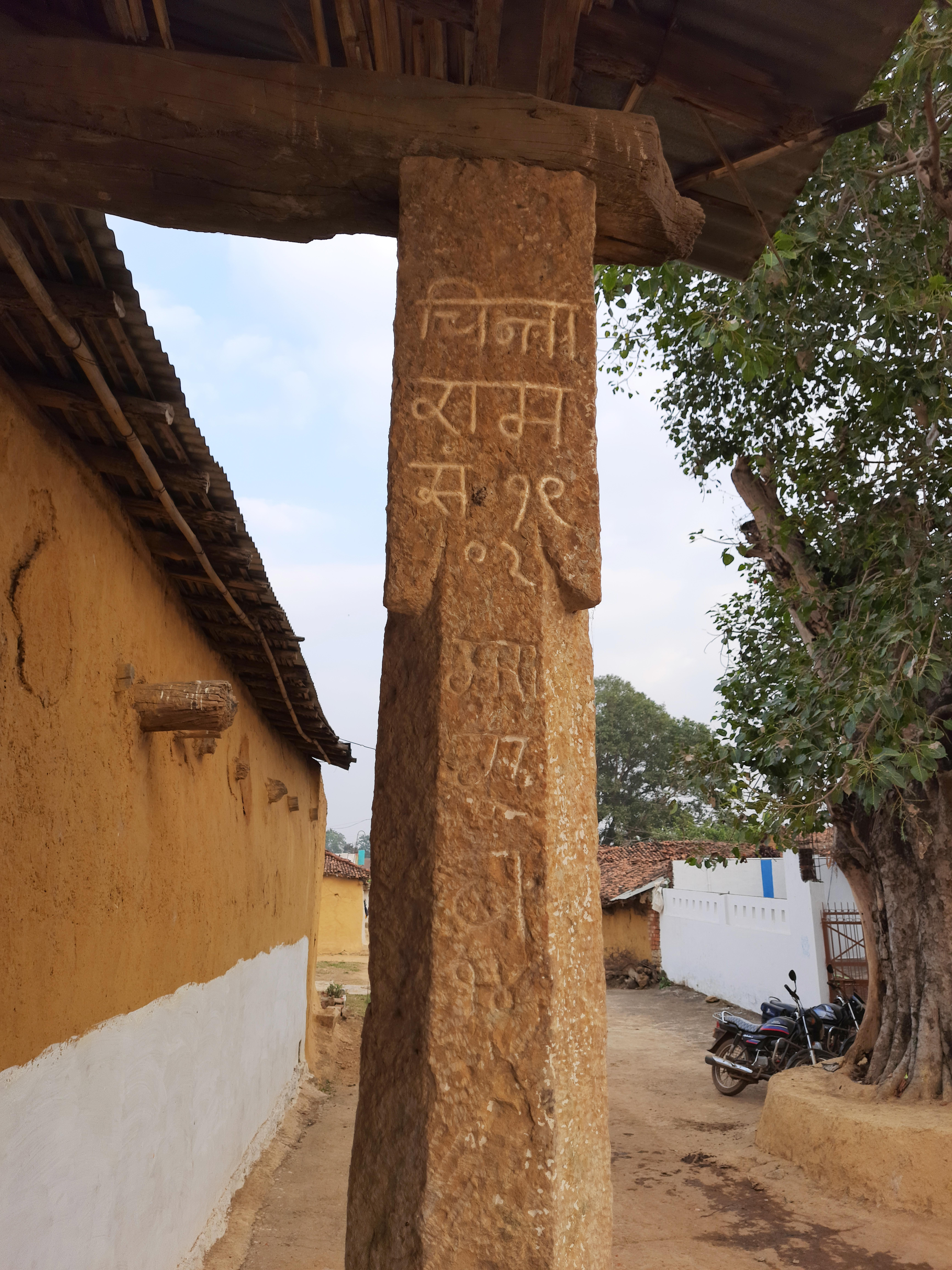
The 14-feet Pillar lifted by Tikariha, with his name engraved on it

Tikariha was renowned for his remarkable displays of physical prowess. His contemporaries recall instance where a bullock cart got stuck in the mud, he would unfasten one bull and pull the cart himself alongside the other bull. On another occasion, when a large tree trunk had fallen onto the road, obstructing his path, he alighted from his cart and single-handedly moved it aside. In yet another demonstration of his strength, when four guests were about to depart without accepting his offer for a meal, they discovered that their jeep was unable to move forward. Upon inspection, they observed that Tikariha had lifted the rear wheels of the car a few inches off the ground.

Tikariha was noted for his physical strength, with several accounts of his feats still recalled in oral histories. Incidents include assisting with stuck bullock carts, removing fallen trees from pathways, and lifting heavy objects during construction projects. In 1935, he reportedly moved a large rock blocking a pathway in Chitrakoot. As a gesture of gratitude, the locals inscribed his name on the rock. The rock remained in its place for several decades until it was relocated in 1996 due to a construction project. In the same year, he is said to have lifted a 14-foot-long rock which weighed over 500 kilograms and positioned it vertically, his name and the date were written on it. According to eyewitness accounts, during the re-construction of a temple in Turturiya, Tikariha lifted rocks weighing over 100-200 kilograms and transported them to the construction site. Additionally, during the construction of his house in the 1940s, he was one of the ten people to carry a 22-feet-long pole, weighing over 1800 kilograms.

== Philanthropy ==
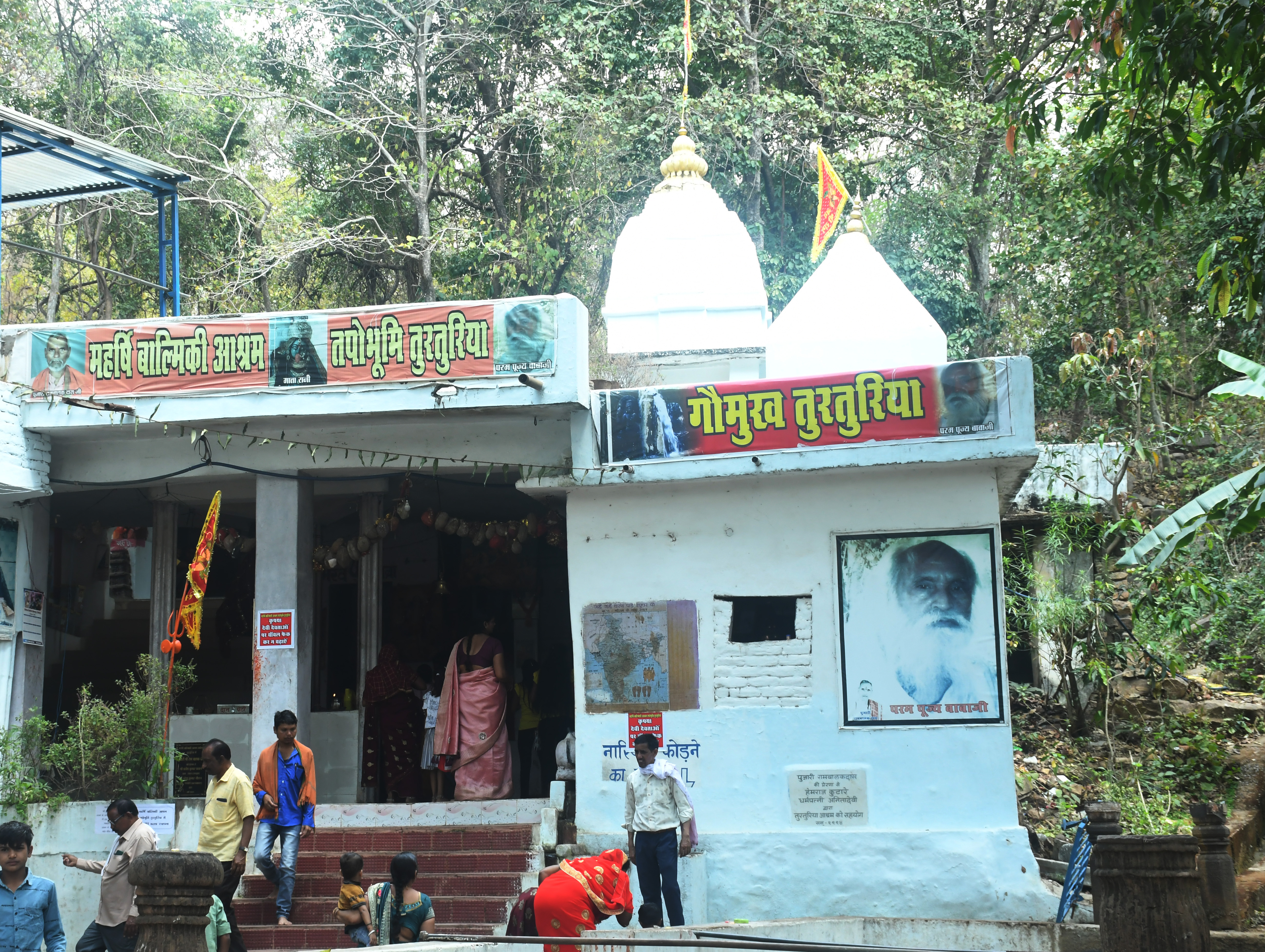
Valmiki Ashram Mandir reconstructed by Tikariha

Tikariha was active in philanthropy, donating his residence for the establishment of a school and creating employment opportunities for local laborers. He provided financial aid to underprivileged families and supported them during periods of famine and floods. Additionally, he advocated for infrastructure development, such as a canal in Budgahan, and contributed his land for road construction without seeking compensation.

=== Temple restoration ===
Between 1969 and 1974, Tikariha played a central role in restoring the ancient temple at Turturiya, often associated with Valmiki Ashram. The site, located in a remote part of Balodabazar district, was in a state of disrepair. Tikariha's efforts facilitated the revival of the temple and transformed it into a recognized place of worship and cultural heritage. The temple restoration is now regarded as a significant contribution to the region's spiritual and cultural identity.

== Legacy ==
Despite his wealth, he maintained a modest lifestyle and was affectionately called "Babu ji" by the local community. Tikariha is remembered through oral histories and is considered a source of pride by his native village of Budgahan and surrounding areas.

=== Films ===
- In 2025 a long form documentary, Chhattisgarh ke Bheem Chintaram was made by filmmaker S Anshu Dhurandhar The docufilm contained testimonies of over 250 people and featured video messages and remarks from various leading figures including cabinet minister Tank Ram Verma, member of parliament Vijay Baghel and Bhupesh Baghel, the former Chief Minister of Chhattisgarh. The film remains the only documented primary source on the life of Tikariha.

=== Books ===
- Chintaram Tikariha's biography was published in 2024. It was authored by S Anshu Dhurandhar.
