= Tala, Chhattisgarh =

Village in India

Tala Talagram तालाग्राम ताला
- Village
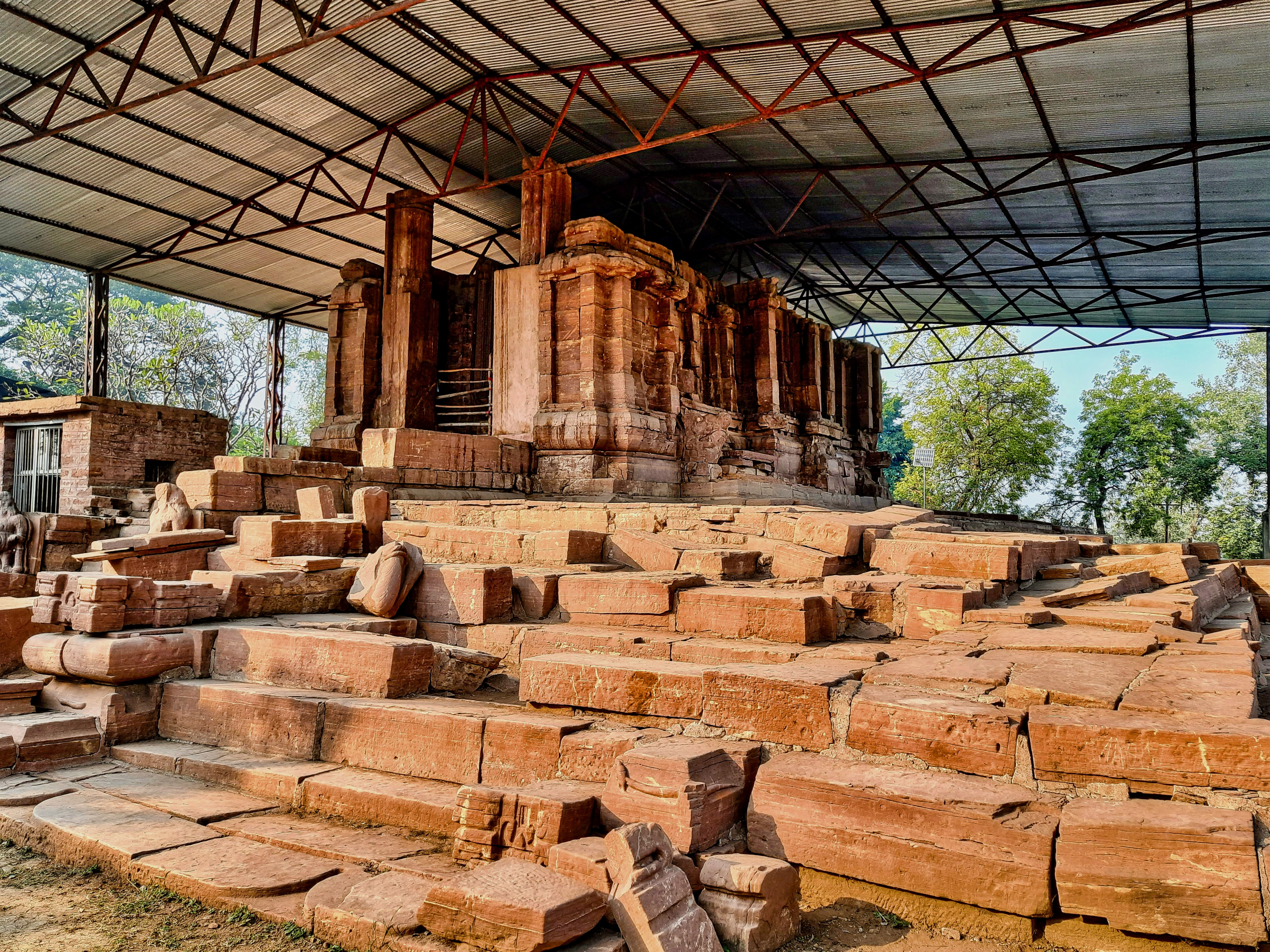
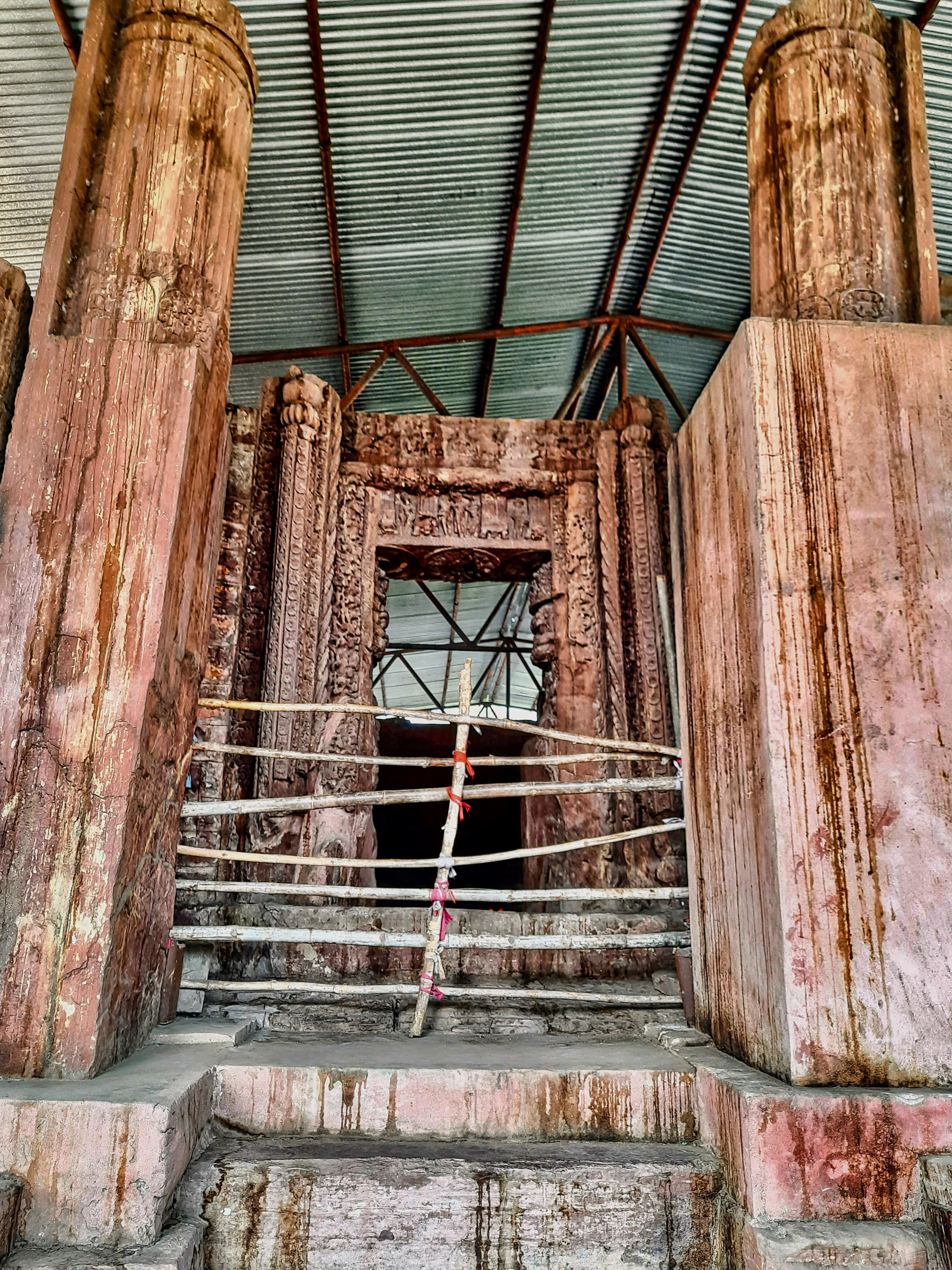
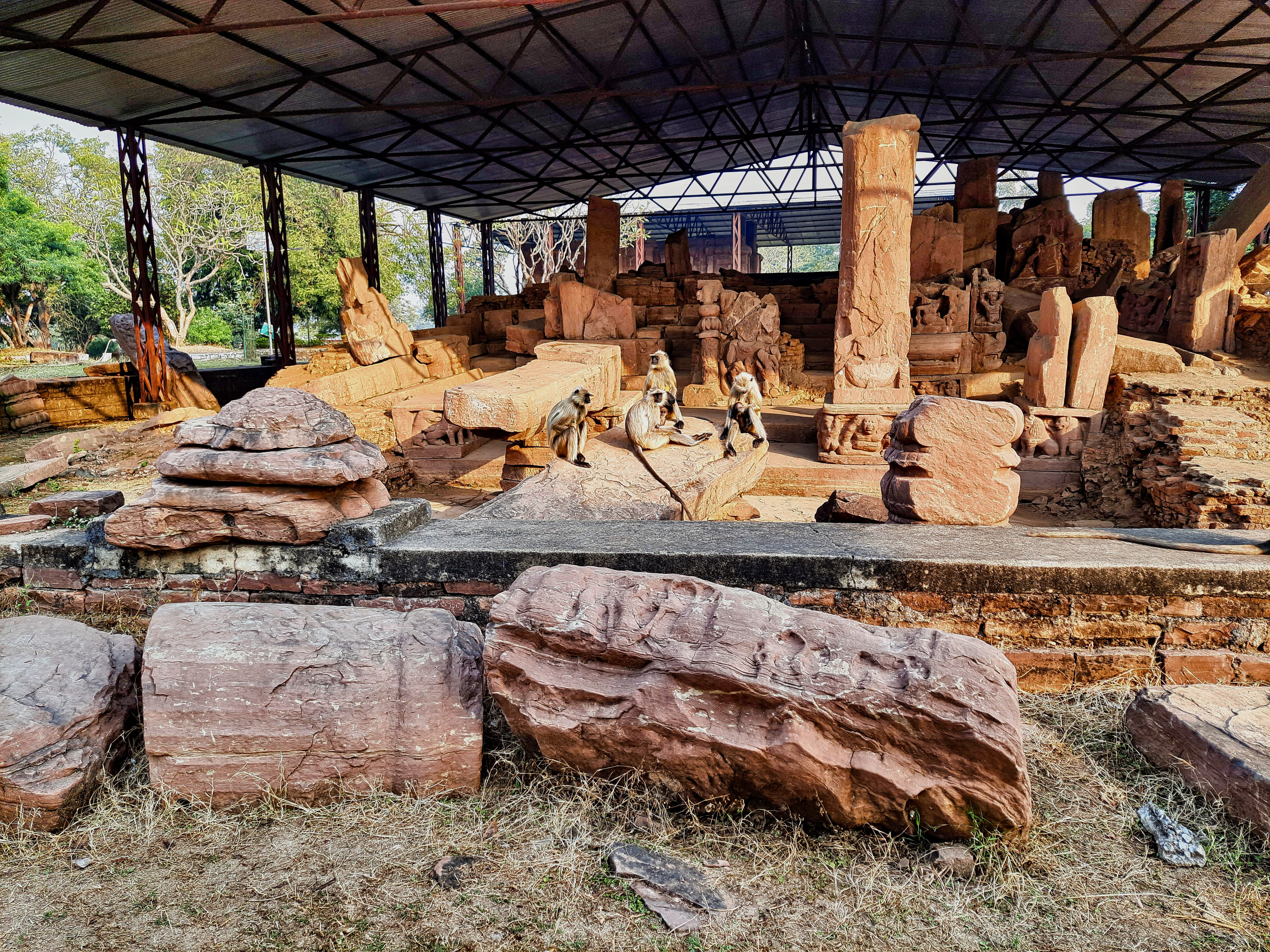
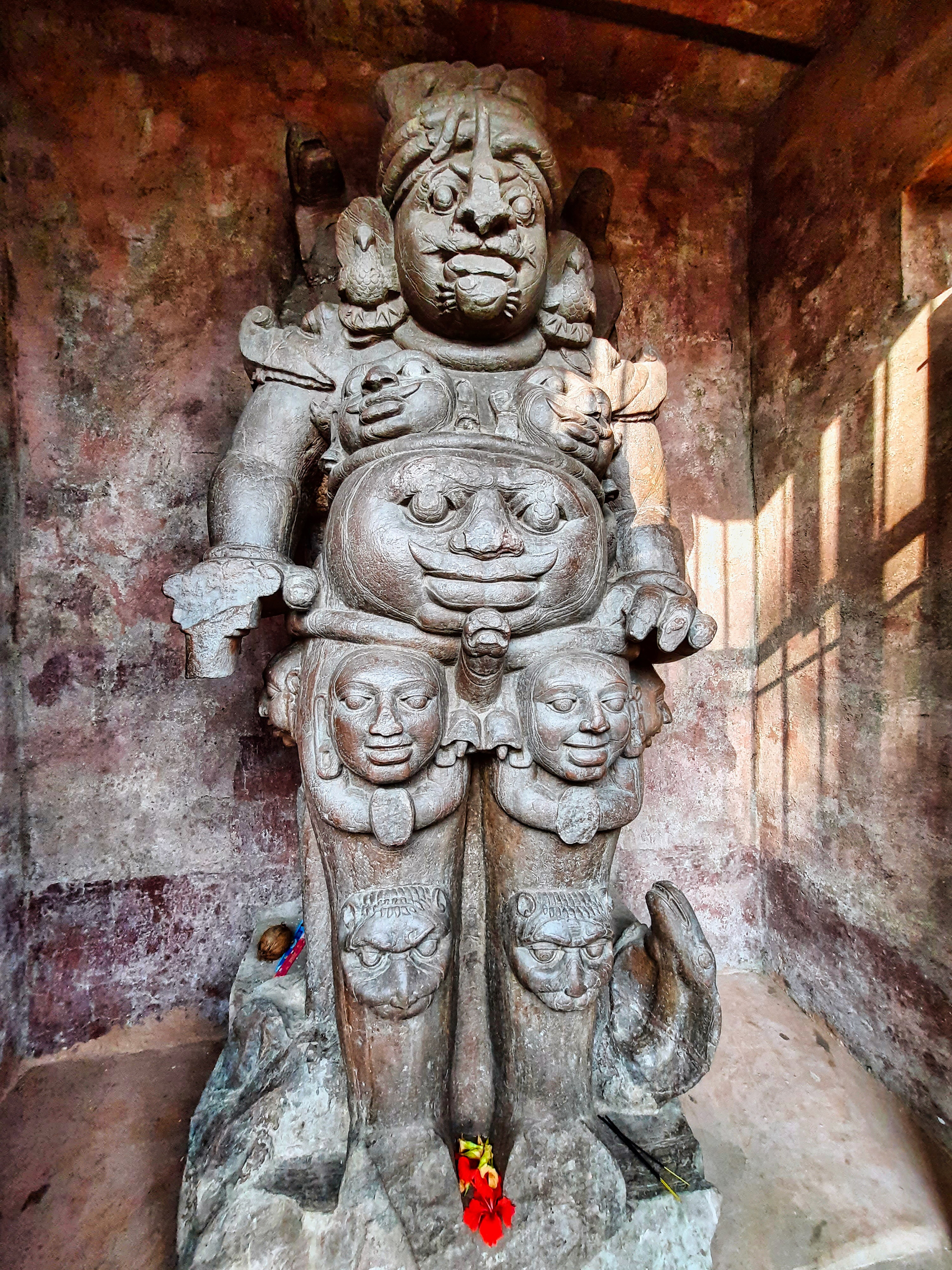
- Devrani Mandir Entrance of Devrani Mandir Ruins of Jethani Mandir Rudra Shiva (statue)

- Location in Chhattisgarh Tala (India)
- Coordinates: 21°54′24″N 82°01′33″E
- Country: India
- State: Chhattisgarh
- District: Bilaspur

Government
  - Type: Panchayat
- Time zone: UTC+5:30 (IST)
- Vehicle registration: CG

Tala is a village in Bilaspur district, of the Chhattisgarh state of India. It is known for Devrani and Jethani temples and a unique Rudra Shiva stone statue.

== Temples ==
The village has a temple complex of Devrani Jethani Temple Complex which are in half ruined stage. It is believed that it was built by two Queens of Rajprashad the ruler of Sharbhpururiya dynasty. Archeologists believe it to be of 5th or 6th century. Devrani temple is made up of red sandstone which is predominantly of Guptan archaeological style. While Jethani temple is of Kushan style.

== Rudra statue ==
A stone statue with a height of about 7 feet and weighing about 5 metric tonnes was found in this village and the statue was buried in soil and in front of Devrani temple. The statue is now protected by Archeological survey of India and is kept locked in a small structure. The uniqueness of this statue is that face and body parts are depicted by various creatures and animals, which is very rare.

Certain historians have interpreted the statue as Rudra Shiva or Pashupathi, by observing several creatures on the body of Shiva. The statue is having eight human head depictions on its body, including the main head and it is on standing posture.
