= Sonadih =

- village
- Country: India
- State: Uttar Pradesh

Languages
  - Official: Hindi
- Time zone: UTC+5:30 (IST)
- Vehicle registration: UP-
- Coastline: 0 kilometres (0 mi)
- Website: sonadihmabhagwati.com

Sonadih is a village situated on NH-29 in Mau District.
