= Devrani Jethani Temple Complex =

Archaeological site in Tala, Chhattisgarh

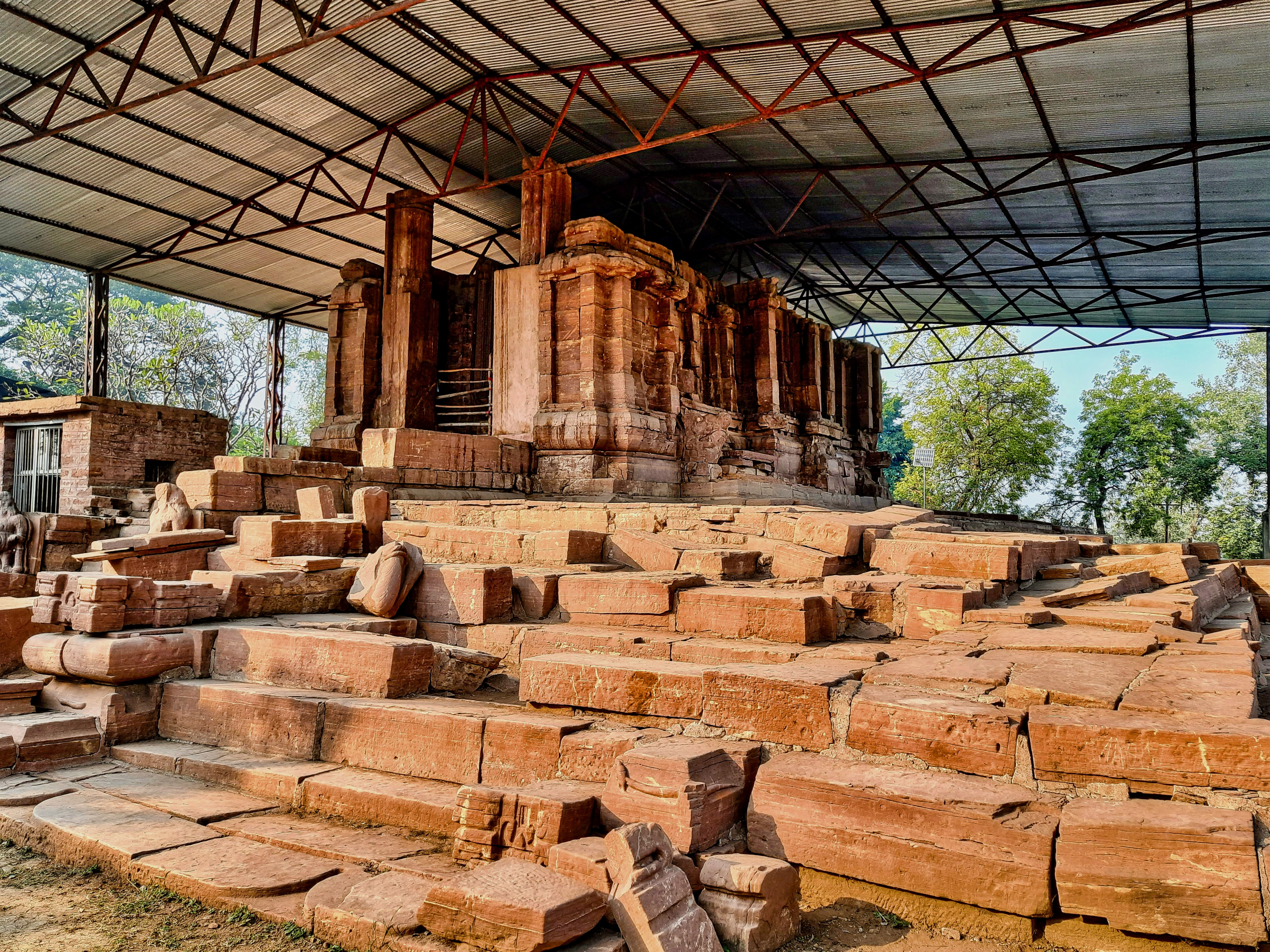
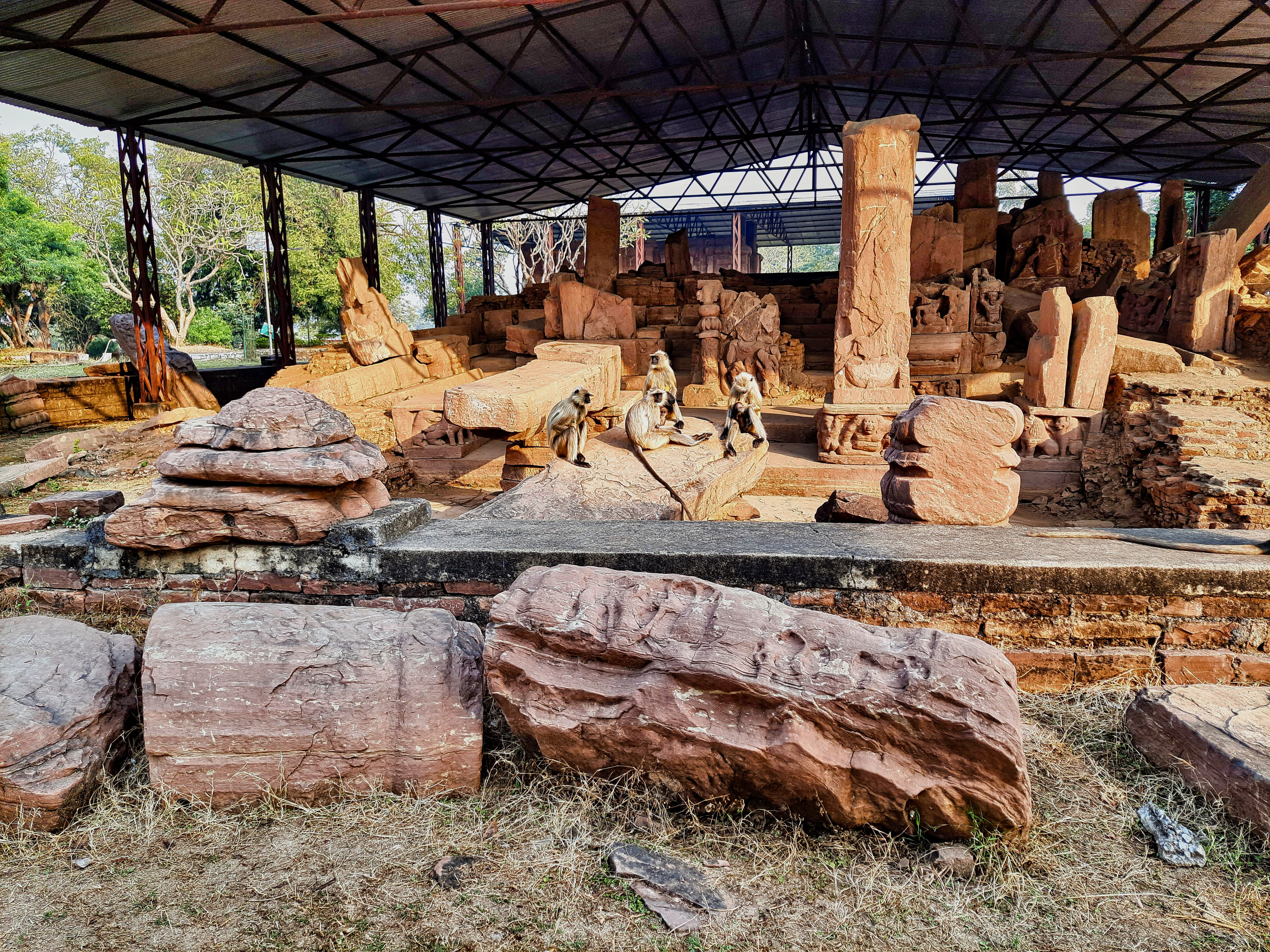
- Devrani Temple Ruins of Jethani Temple

Religion
- Affiliation: Hinduism
- Sect: Shaivism
- Deity: Rudra Shiva

Location
- Location: Tala, Bilaspur district
- State: Chhattisgarh
- Country: India
- Interactive map of Devrani Jethani Temple Complex
- Coordinates: 21.9072°N 82.0259°E

Architecture
- Type: Ruined Hindu temple
- Completed: 525–550 CE

The Devrani Jethani Temple Complex is a complex of two ruined temples located in Tala, India. The Devrani temple is in a state of good preservation. Consisting of a shrine, antechamber, and pavilion, it is built out of ashlar. The doorway of the temple is lavishly decorated with sculptures carved in relief. A Rudra Shiva statue excavated from the temple is placed in situ, and various parts of its body are represented by animal figures as well as human heads. The Jethani temple is in ruins, and its plan can be ascertained by fragments strewn across the temple site. The temples are an important example of the architecture of the Dakshina Kosala region.

== History ==
Due to the lack of a foundation inscription or other epigraphical evidence regarding its construction, the dating of the temple complex is based upon the architectural style. Historian of Indian art Donald Stadtner dates both the temples to around the same time, approximately 525–550 CE. Others have dated both temples to the late 6th century, during the reign of the Sharabhapuriya dynasty. Indologist Hans Bakker argues that the Jethani temple was built at an earlier date than the Devrani temple, ascertained due to the fact that the Jethani temple has a somewhat unconventional and experimental structure and may have collapsed under its own weight. This view is also supported by the fact that the reliefs on the entrance of the Devrani temple are more refined.

The temples were excavated in the 20th century by the Archaeological Survey of India. In the course of the excavations, the scattered fragments of the Jethani temple were studied, and some were placed in the Bilaspur museum. In 1988, the massive Rudra Shiva sculpture was unearthed from beneath the Devrani temple, which is now placed in situ.

The complex of two ruined temples located, dating to the 6th century CE, was excavated by the Archaeological Survey of India in 1977–1978, and again in 1984, after it was declared a protected monument.

A third phase of excavation was conducted in 1987–1988, under the supervision of K. K. Chakravarty. It was focused around the southeast of the Devrani Temple, near its entrance, and the Rudra Shiva was unearthed here on 17 January 1988. The statue was found buried, with its ventral side down, and dorsal side facing up. Based on the lack of damage to the statue, it is posited that it was deliberately buried, rather than having fallen down accidentally. As of 2018, the statue is displayed in situ, and a shed has been built around it for protection.

== Description ==
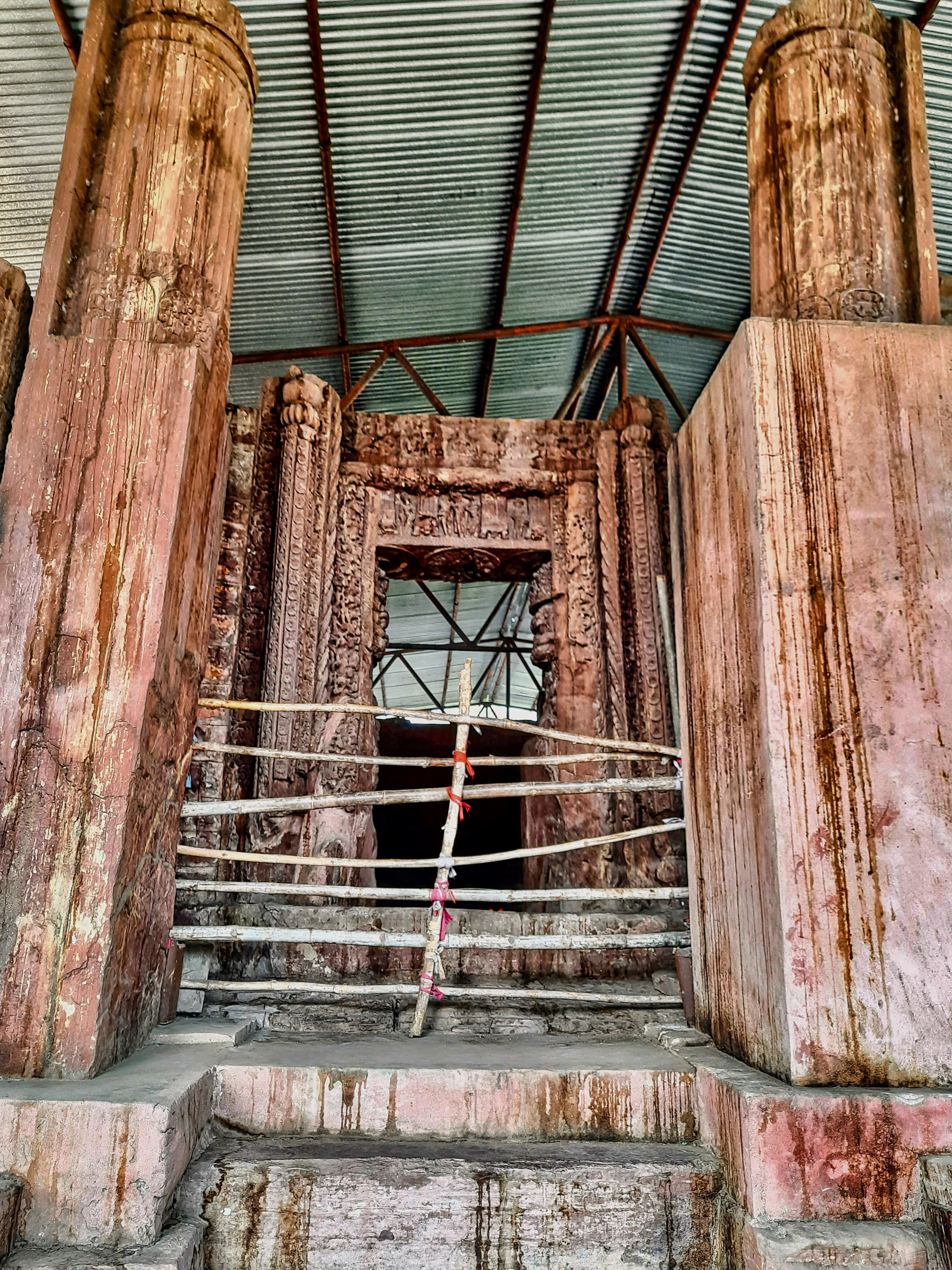
Entrance of the Devrani temple

=== Devrani Temple ===
The Devrani temple is fairly well-preserved, apart from the fact that its shikhara (temple tower) is lost. It is aligned along an east–west axis, with its entrance facing east and the rear facing the Maniari river to the west. The entrance is accessible by a flight of steps. The temple measures 22.9 by 9.8 metres (75 by 32 ft) and is constructed from ashlar.

It consists of a garbhagriha (sanctum), antarala (antechamber), and a small mukhamandapa (pavilion). The sanctum is slightly larger than the antechamber. On each exterior wall of the temple, there are two vertical niches rising up to the roof. These are shallow and narrow, and it does not seem likely that any sculptures occupied the niches. The positions of these niches on the northern and southern wall correspond with the centers of the sanctum and the antechamber. Such niches are an element of early Dravidian temple architecture, seen in temples such as the Badami Shivalaya. The entrance to the pavilion is flanked by two monolithic pillars.

==== Doorway ====
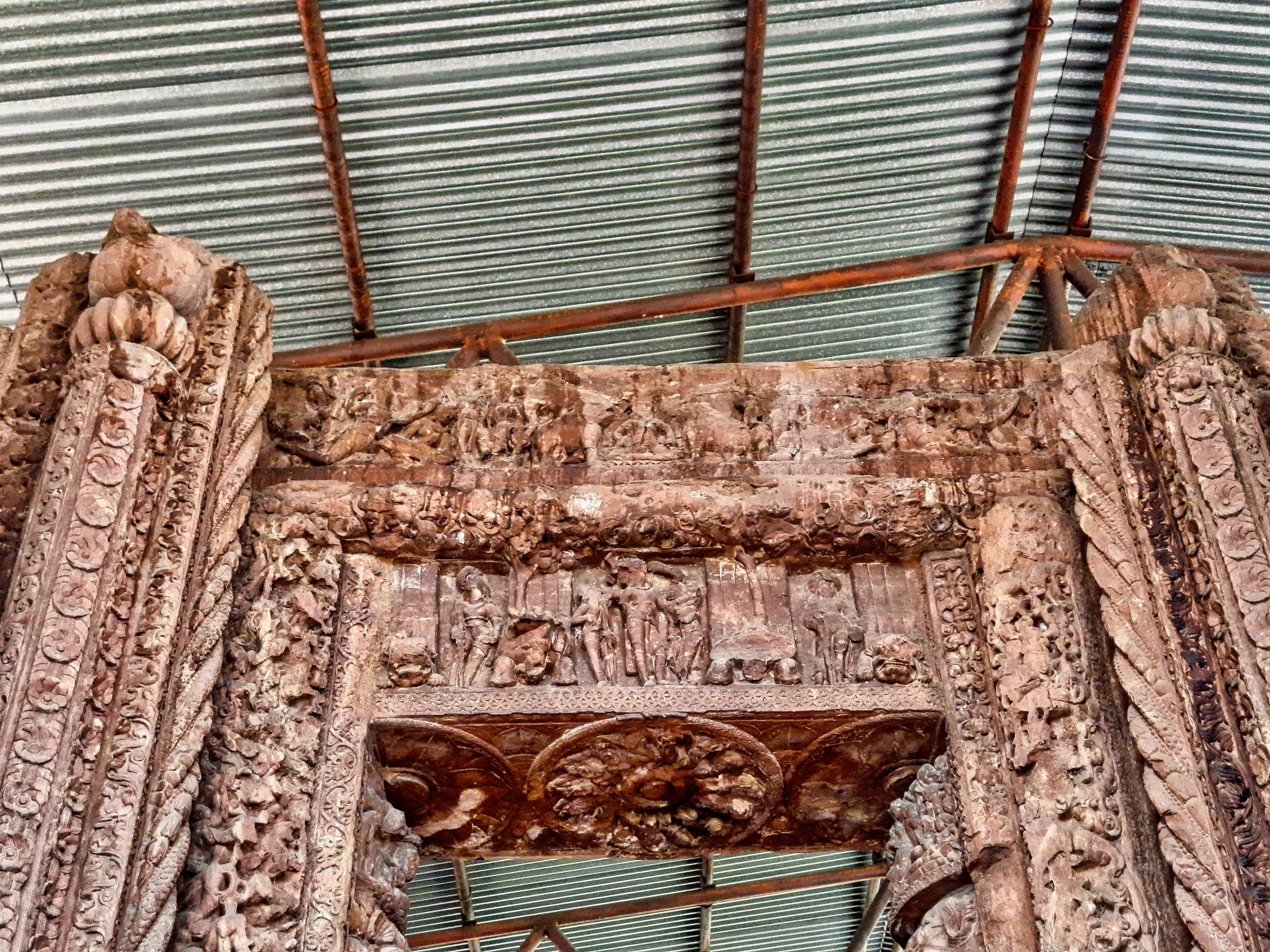
The elaborately carved doorway

The doorway is elaborately decorated. The outer side of the doorframe is composed of six sakhas (bands). The first three inner bands display leaf motifs, foliate scrolls interwoven with birds, and a twisted twisted garland respectively. The fourth is a narrow band, displaying leaf motifs. The fifth is a jamb in the form of a pillar, with a pot-shaped base and kirtimukha figures at the top. The outermost band is broad, again displaying leaf motifs.

The base of the doorjamb contains two large standing female figures, along with attendants. The figures are mutilated; However, they likely depict the river goddesses Ganga and Yamuna. The inner faces of the doorjamb contain reliefs, with each face being divided into four unequal panels. On the northern doorjamb, Shaivite imagery is depicted, including a depiction of Uma Maheshwara. On the southern doorjamb, Kubera is seen with a lingam above his head, along with six attendants. This is followed by kirtimukhas and mithunas.

The lintel is divided into two horizontal sections. The upper section features an image of Gajalakshmi at the center, flanked by two elephants and vidyadhara couples. In the lower section, the Kankala incarnation of Shiva is depicted in the center, with attendants on either side. Elephant and lion busts, along with other gods, also occupy this section. On the underside of the lintel are three circular medallions. The central medallion contains fifteen squatting figures, each with its right hand placed upon the head of the figure in front.

==== Rudra Shiva Statue ====
Tala Rudra Shiva Statue
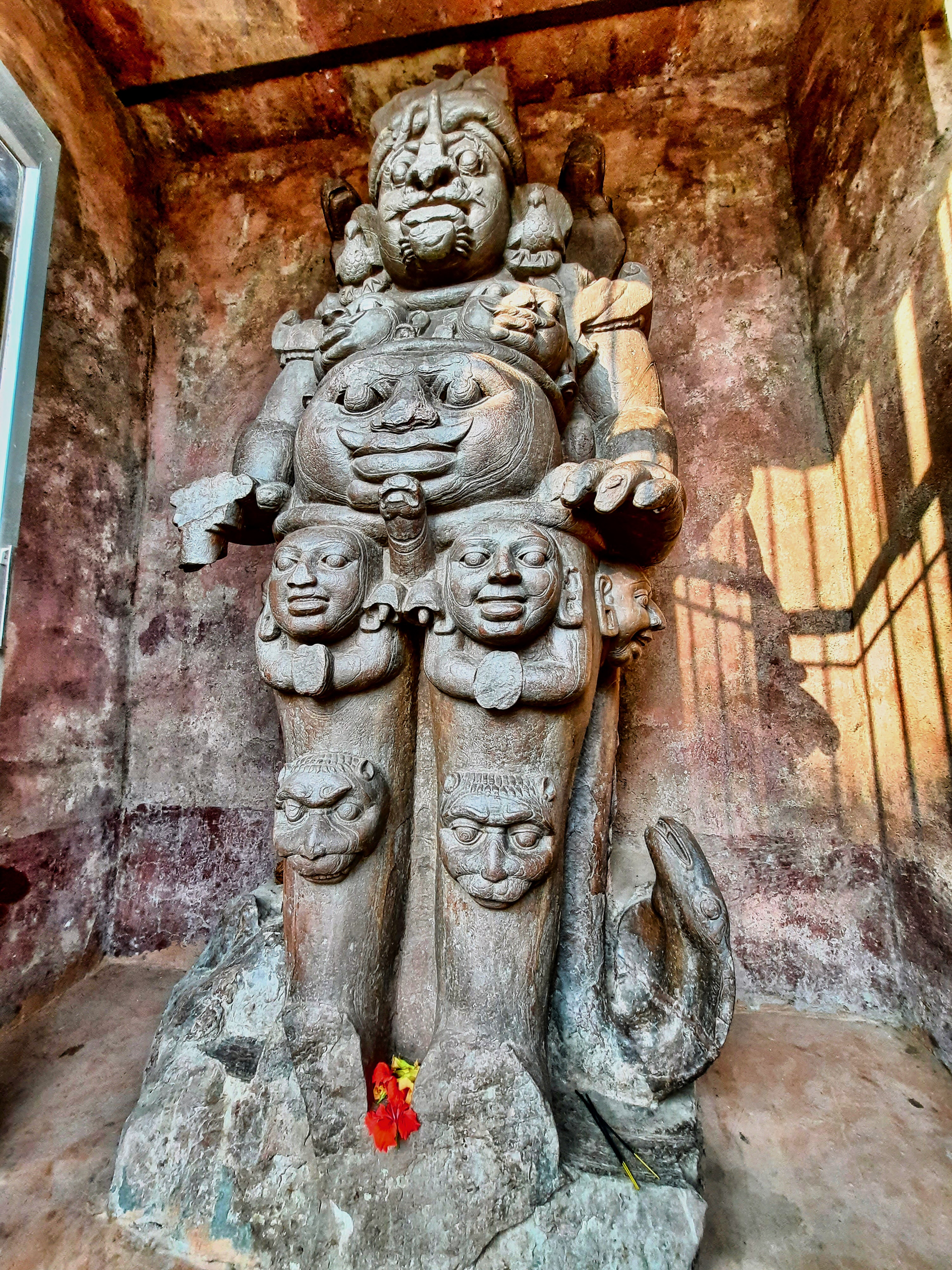
- Height: 2.7 meters
- Weight: About 5 tonnes
- Discovered: 17 January 1988
- Present location: Devrani Jethani Temple Complex, Tala, India

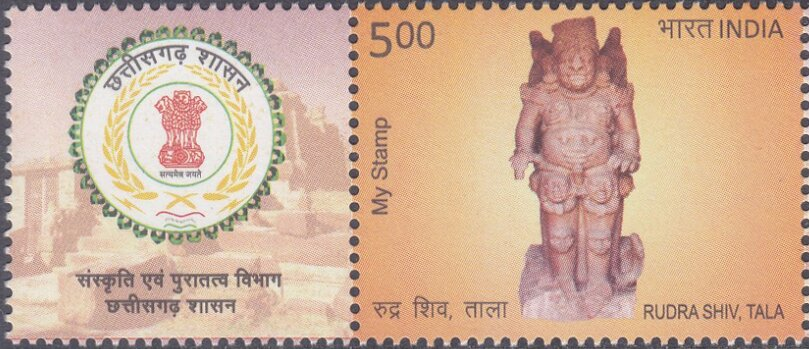
The statue, depicted on a 2009 stamp of India.

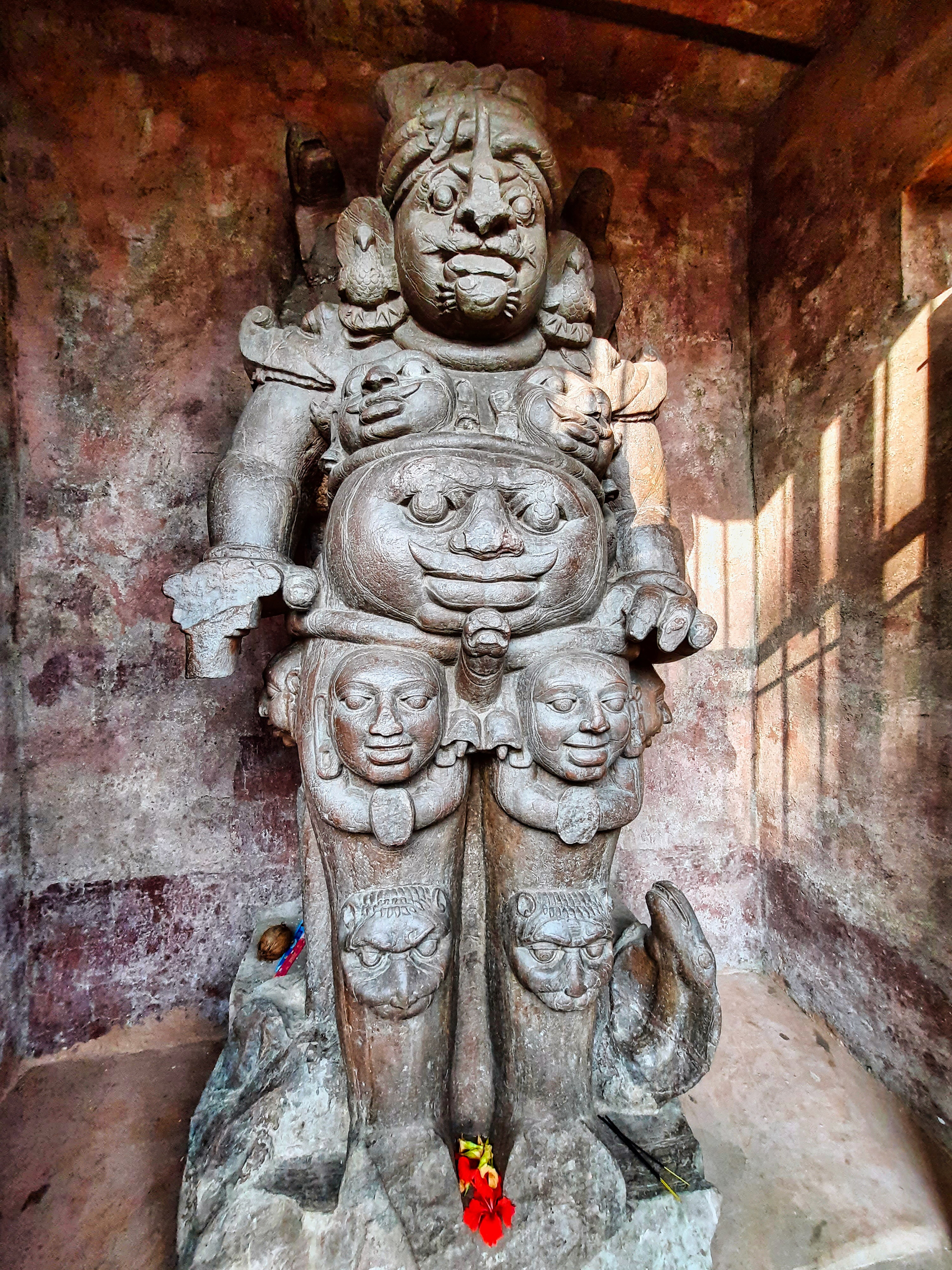
The statue of Rudra Shiva excavated from the Devrani temple

A statue was found buried there in 1988, identified as Rudra Shiva. It weighs 5 long tons (11,000 lb; 5,100 kg) and has a height of 8 feet (2.4 m). Various parts of the figure's body are represented by animals and human heads. A lizard forms its nose while the hind legs of the lizard form the eyebrows. The eyes are shaped like frogs and peacocks constitute the ears of the figure. The moustache is composed of two fishes, while the lower lip and chin are formed by a crab. The shoulders are shaped like makara crocodiles, while the knees are made out of lion-heads. Human heads are found on the chest, torso, and thighs of the figure.

The statue is about 2.7 meters tall, and weighs about 5 tonnes. Various parts of the figure's body are represented as animals, and some are in the form of human faces. The identity of this figure is a matter of contention among historians. It is popularly identified as Shiva in his Rudra form. However, some scholars have also posited that it might depict Pashupati, or that it might have functioned as a dvarapala (door guardian statue).

===== Description =====
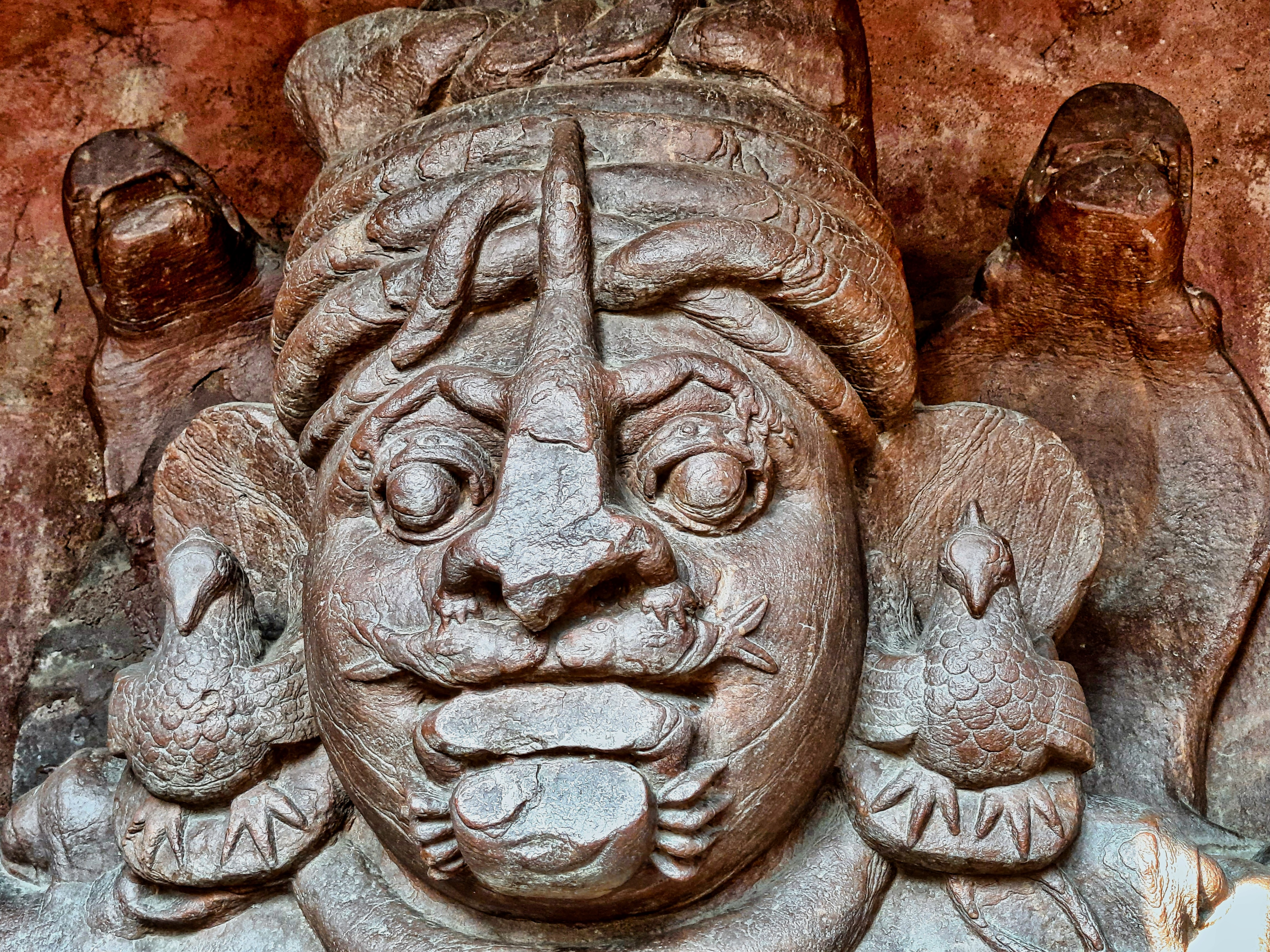
The face of the statue. Various parts are in the form of animals; These include the eyes (frogs), nose (lizard), lips (fish), ears (peacocks), and chin (crab).

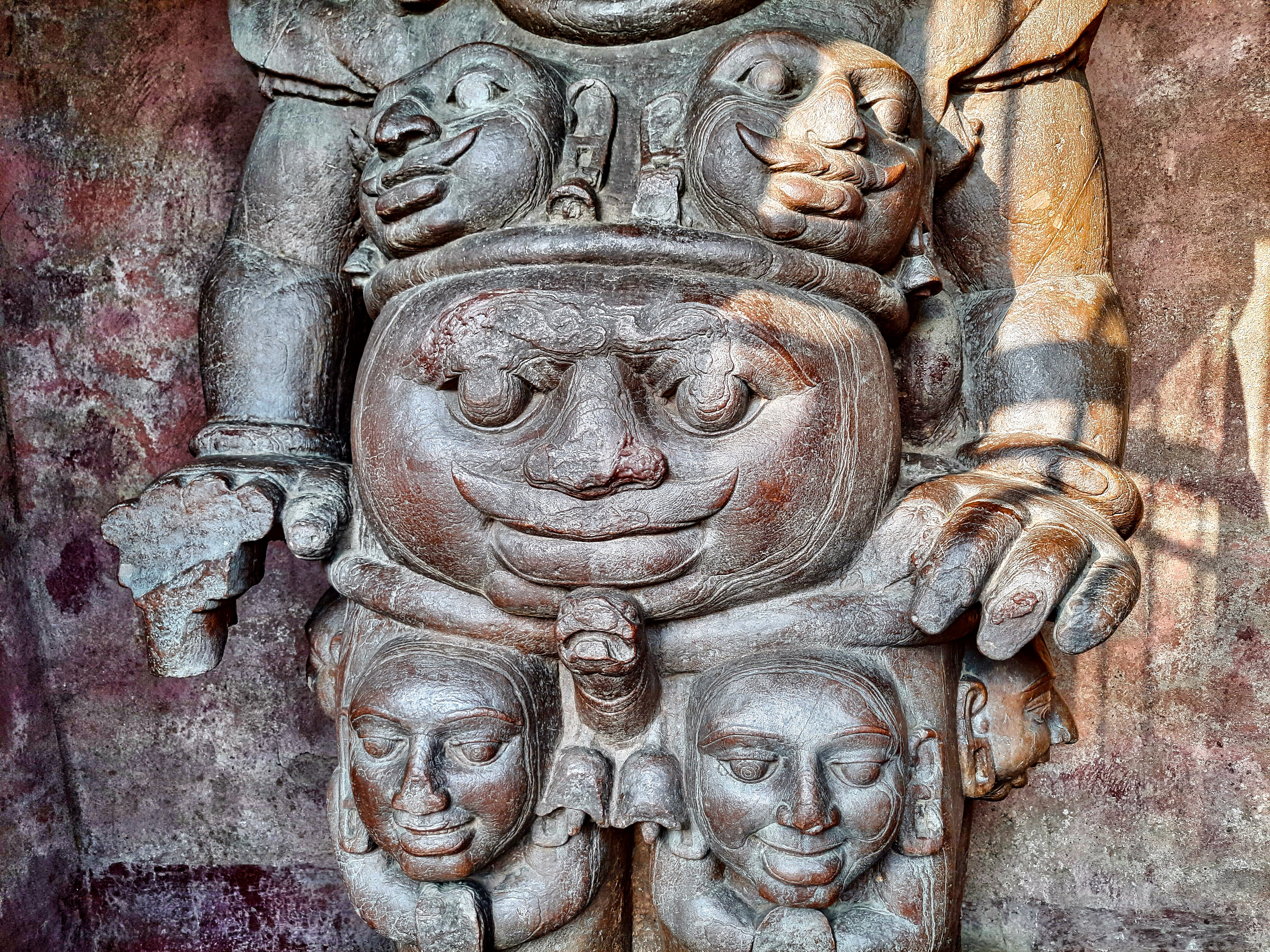
Seven human heads located on the statue, with two found on the chest, a large head constituting the abdomen, and a pair of heads on each of the thighs. The erect penis in the form of a tortoise is also seen.

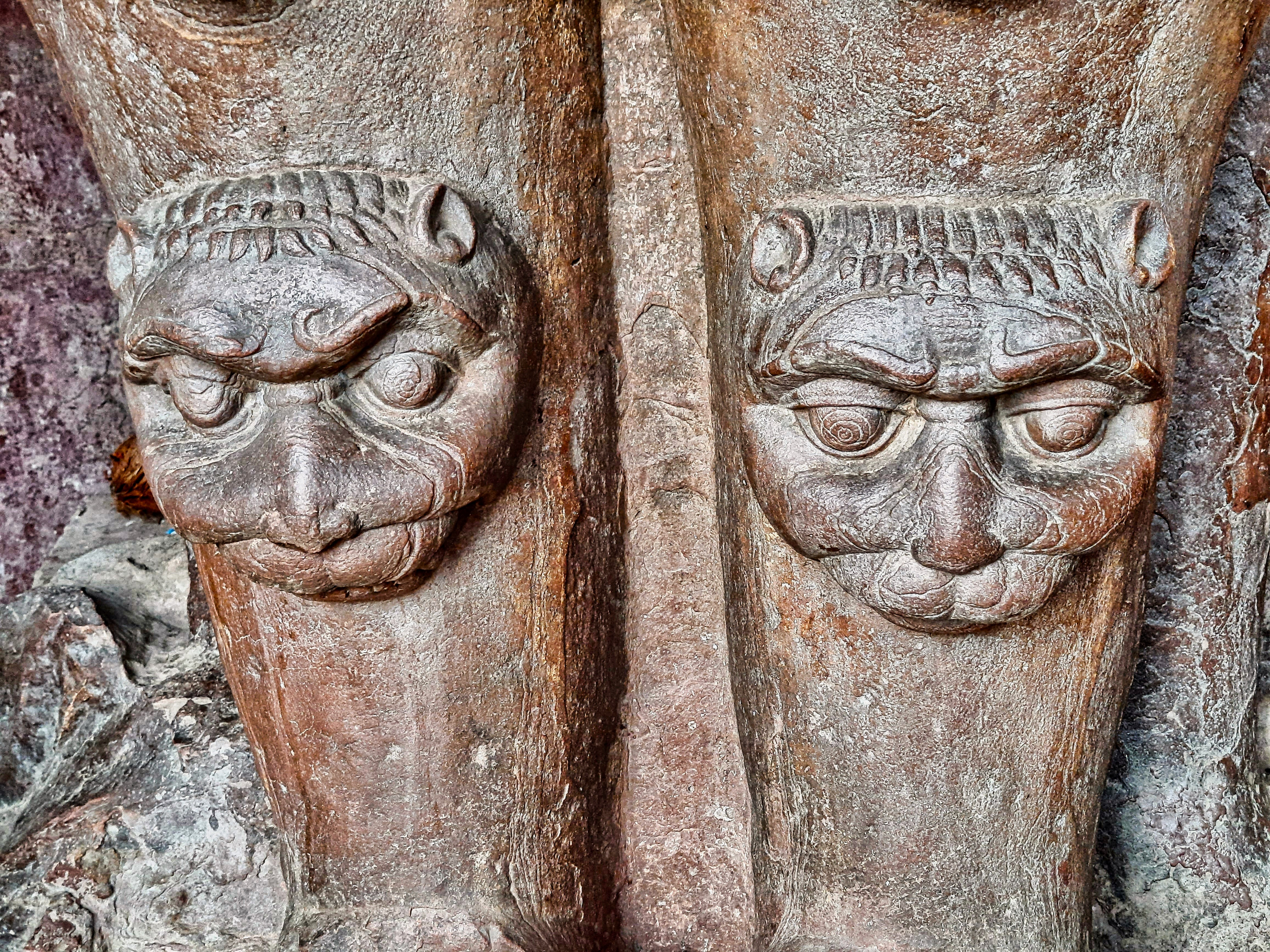
Lion-heads constitute the knees of the figure.

The statue is about 2.7 meters tall, and weighs about 5 tonnes. It is a two-armed figure, and stands in the samapada position, i. e. with its feet together. Various parts of its body are made out of animal figures, human heads, and lion heads. The figure is wearing a jata turban, which is composed of two snakes. A lizard forms its nose, while the hind legs of the lizard form the eyebrows. The eyes are shaped like frogs, and peacocks constitute the ears. The moustache is composed of two fishes, while the lower lip and chin are formed by a crab. The shoulders are in the form of makara crocodiles. Its hands are resting upon its waistband, which is in the form of a snake. Its fingers are also in the form of a snake, and a snake twists around the left leg of the figure.

Seven human heads are found throughout its body. These include two heads which form the chest, and a large head which forms the abdomen. These are male heads, and their faces are mustached. Each thigh contains a pair of female heads, one facing the front and the other facing the side. The front-facing heads have smiling faces, and folded hands emerging from them (in the anjali posture).

The figure has an erect penis, composed of the head and neck of a tortoise, while its forelimbs constitute the testicles. Lion-heads constitute each knee. The figure's legs are shaped like elephant legs.

===== Analysis =====
The statue is popularly considered to depict Shiva in his Rudra form. While the ithyphallic nature of the statue points to this conclusion, it does not contain any of the other characteristic features of Shiva. The prolific use of animal imagery leads some scholars to the conclusion that it depicts Pashupati, which is the form of Shiva worshipped as the "lord of animals". However, this does not explain the human heads which are also found on the statue. Hans Bakker notes the similarities between ganas (attendants of Shiva) and this sculpture, and identifies it as a gana. Other interpretations identify it as a Yaksha.

If the spot where it was excavated (by the doorway of the Devrani temple) was where the figure originally stood, it might have functioned as a dvarapala, or "door guardian" statue.

=== Jethani Temple ===
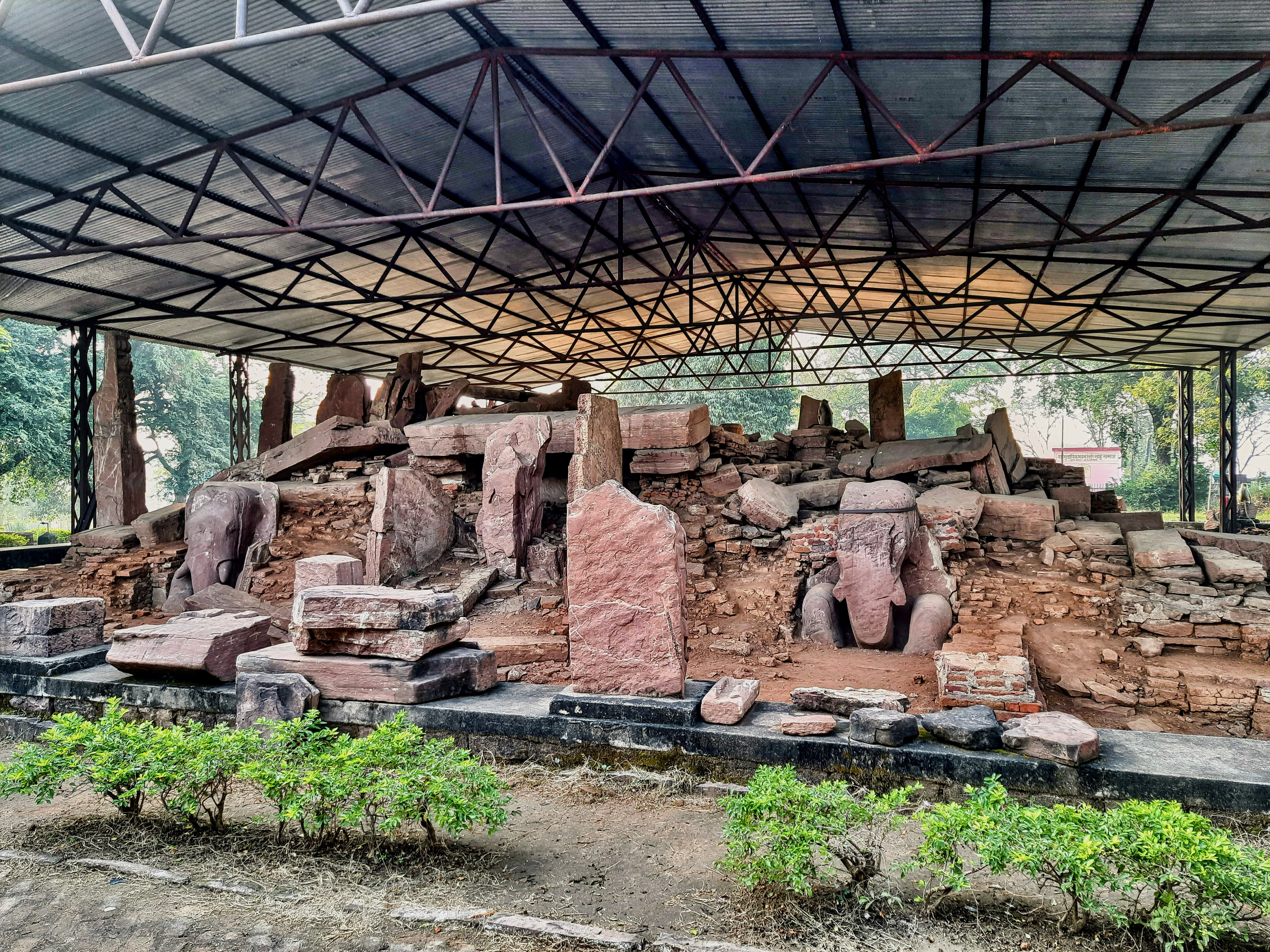
Ruins of the Jethani temple

The Jethani Temple is in ruins, and its plan is ascertained from the remains of pillars and sculpture scattered across the site. The temple is regarded as an experimental structure, and it may have collapsed under its own weight. Brick buttresses are found throughout the base of the temple, and towards the northern side, two large stone elephants are also present, which would have supported the weight of the temple. It is presumed that these were added as an attempt to stop the temple from collapsing.

The temple had three entrances, with the main entrance facing south, accessible by a flight of steps. The other two entrances faced east and west. Among the ruins, several Shaivite sculptures are found, including those of Kartikeya, Shiva, Ardhanarishvara, and Nandi. The prolific Shaivite imagery indicates that this temple was also dedicated to Shiva. The ruins also contain makara and gana figures, which had been used to support pillars. Some of these fragments are housed in the Bilaspur Museum.

Three large stone amalakas are also among the ruins. If these were used in the temple superstructure, it would indicate that the Jithani temple is built in a more conventional north Indian architectural style, as opposed to the Devarani temple, which displays south Indian influences.

== Bibliography ==
- Deva, Krishna (1988). "Panduvamsis of Sripura and Nalas". Encyclopaedia of Indian Temple Architecture: Volume II, Part 1 – Text. pp. 227–230.
- Stadtner, Donald M. (1980). "A Sixth-Century A.D. Temple from Kosala". Archives of Asian Art. 33: 38–48. ISSN 0066-6637. JSTOR 20111103.
- Bakker, Hans (1994). Observations on the History and Culture of Daksina Kosala (PDF).
- Bosma, Natasja (2018). Dakṣiṇa Kosala: A Rich Centre of Early Śaivism (PDF) (Thesis). Rijksuniversiteit Groningen.
- Nigam, L. S. (2000). "The Image of Siva from Tala: Issues in Identification and Interpretation of the Symbols Therein". In Nigam, L. S. (ed.). Riddle of Indian Iconography: Zetetic on Rare Icon from Tala. Sharada Publishing House. pp. 61–68. ISBN 978-81-85616-63-6.
- Srinivasan, Doris Meth (2000). "Rupa Yakṣa: Unique Icon / Unique Identification". In Nigam, L. S. (ed.). Riddle of Indian Iconography: Zetetic on Rare Icon from Tala. Sharada Publishing House. pp. 89–96. ISBN 978-81-85616-63-6.
- Bakker, Hans (2000). "An Enigmatic Giant from Tala". In Nigam, L. S. (ed.). Riddle of Indian Iconography: Zetetic on Rare Icon from Tala. Sharada Publishing House. pp. 101–105. ISBN 978-81-85616-63-6.
