= Dhumnath Temple =

Coordinates: 21°54′04″N 81°58′32″E

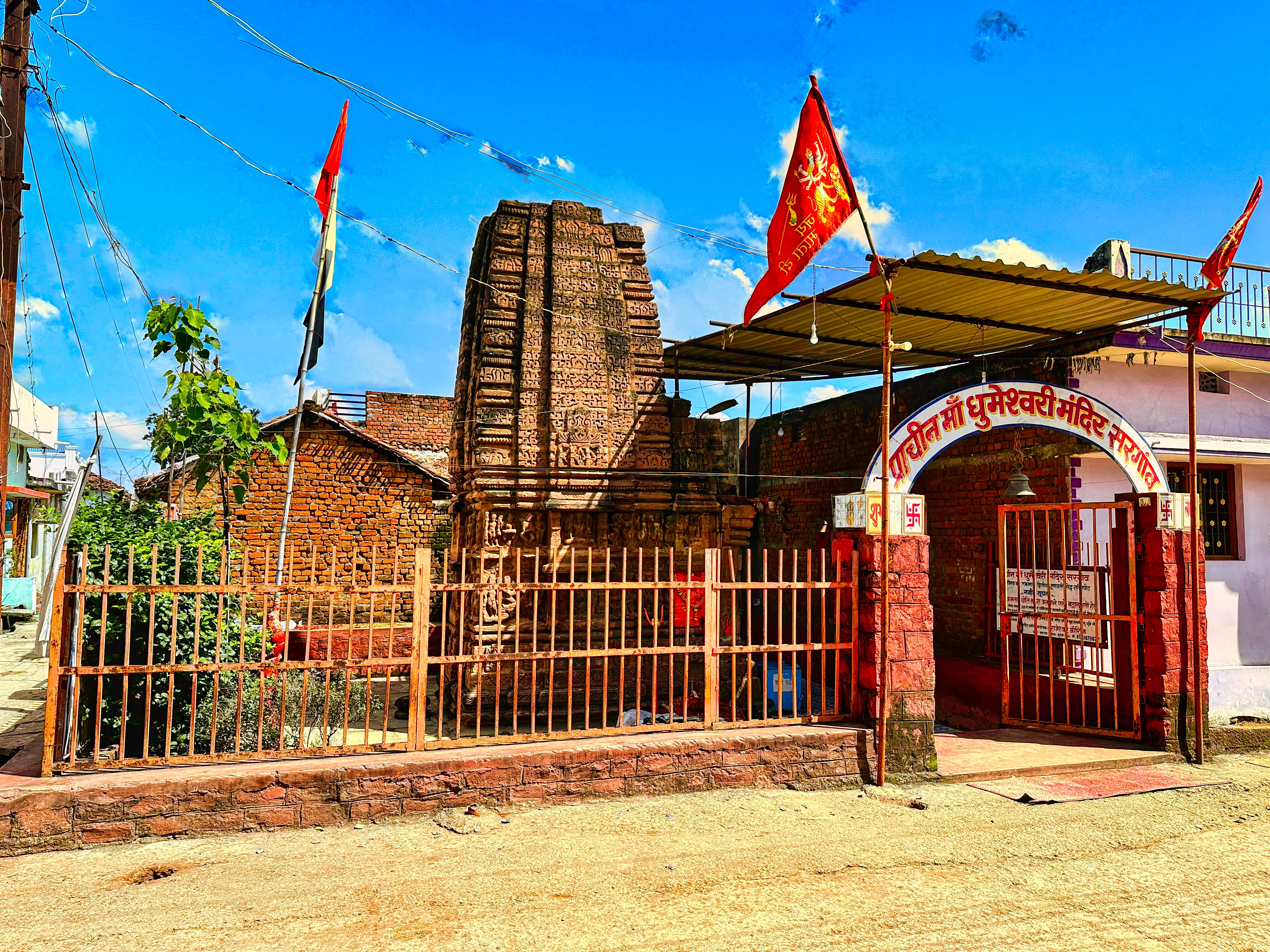

Religion
- Affiliation: Hinduism

Location
- Location: Sargaon
- Interactive map of Dhumnath Temple

Dhumnath Temple (also known as Dhoomnath, Dhumesvari, or Dhoomeshwari) is a Shiva temple located in Sargaon village, in the Indian state of Chhattisgarh. It is listed as a state protected monument and was built during the reign of the Kalachuris of Ratanpura.

The temple is situated in the middle of the village, with several houses encroaching upon the hall and ante-chamber towards the east. The eastern wall of the sanctum is incorporated as a courtyard wall in one of the surrounding houses. The temple is of the Bhumija variety. It features a curvilinear shikhara (temple tower) in the Nagara style. The shikhara used to be topped by an amalaka, which is now lost. The temple has three rathas, and reliefs on the exterior walls are divided into two sections by a band. These reliefs consist of Hindu gods as well as erotic imagery depicting various poses described in the Kama Sutra and other ancient Indian texts.

The right wall contains images of Brahma, Chamunda, Mahishasuramardini, as well as dance and musical scenes carved in relief. The left wall has images of Shiva-Parvati, Ganesha, and Kartikeya. Mahishasuramardini is present in the upper niche. The next panel contains an image of a male figure displaying his penis with his legs raised, which is an unusual depiction. The entrance is raised at a height of about 5 feet (1.5 m) above ground and is accessed by three steps. However, the interior of the shrine is situated below ground level, reachable by descending six steps. The doorway to the sanctum has Shiva on the lintel. On the left of Shiva is Brahma, and on the right is a mutilated figure, which might be Vishnu. The shrine contains a Shiva lingam.

== Gallery ==
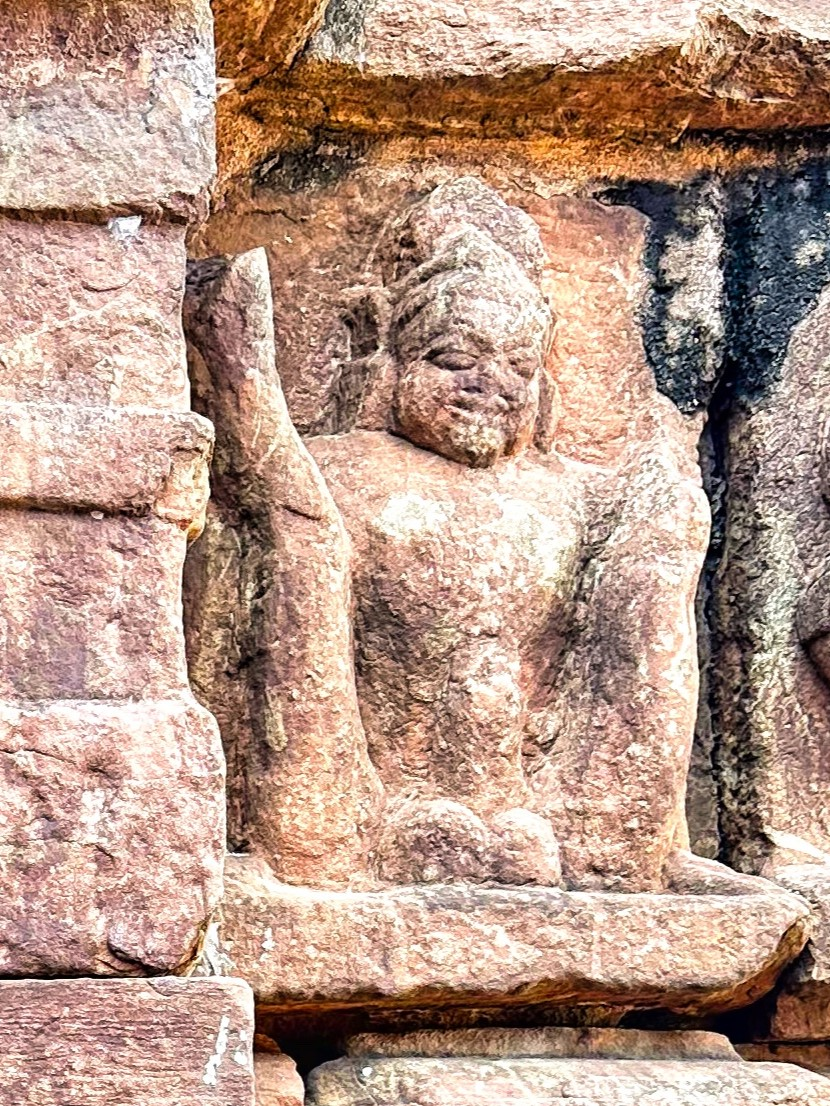
An image of a male figure displaying his penis with his legs raised.

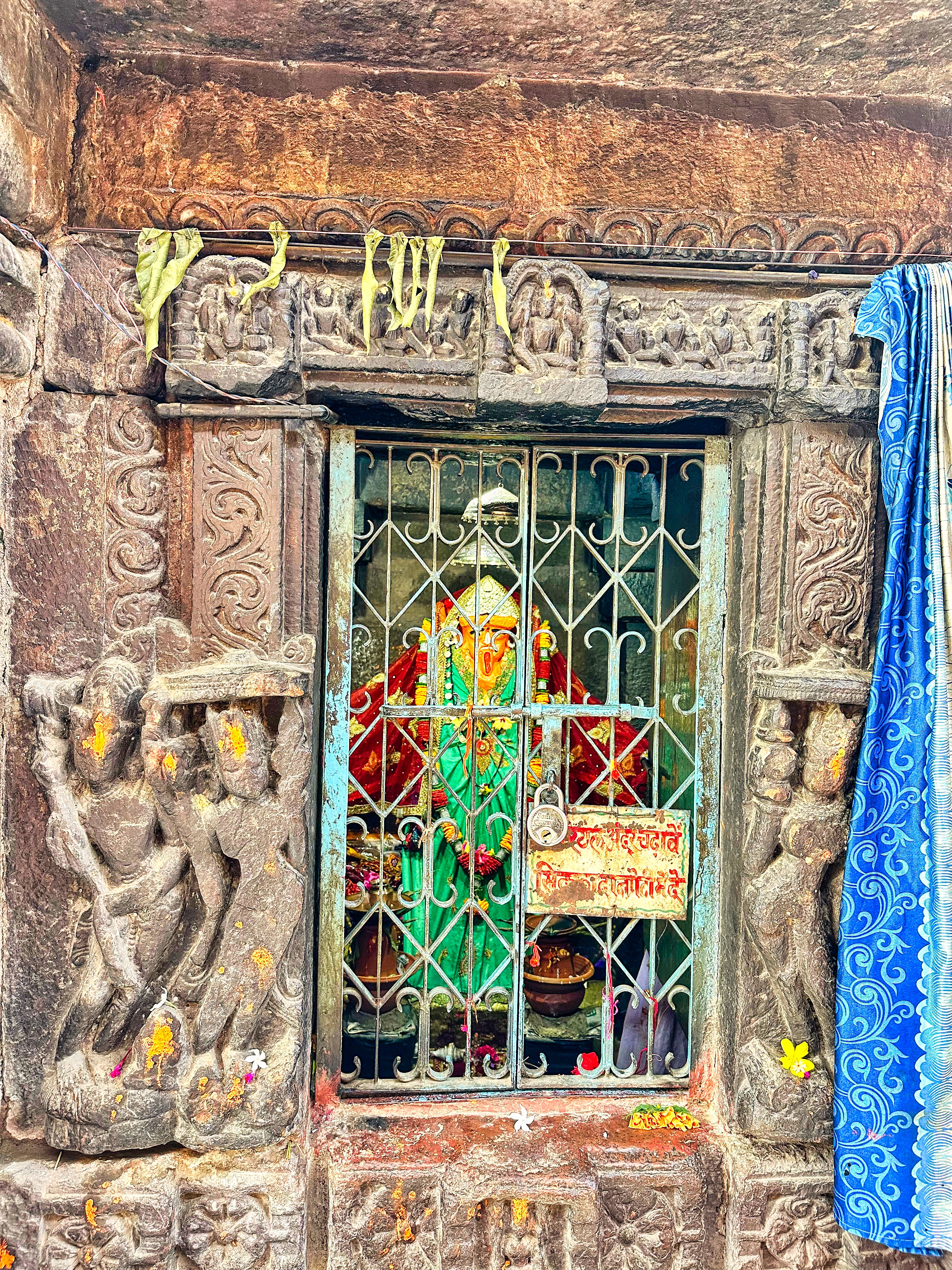
Doorway to the santum, with the deity inside.

== Bibliography ==
- Manwani, S N (1984). "The Kalachuri Temples - North of Mahanadi". Temple Art of the Kalachuris of Ratanpur. pp. 107–112.
