= Palari, Madhya Pradesh =

Village in Madhya Pradesh, India

Coordinates: 22.304°N 79.813°E

Palari is a small village of Seoni district of Madhya Pradesh, India. The village is locally famous for its fertile land, and for its mandi, where farmers sell wheat and soybean.

== Location ==
The village is located beside the Sagar river. Village comes under Keolari tehsil and Seoni District .

== Transportation ==
Bus and railway are the common means of transport here. The area once had a local railway station.

== Education ==
The village has a higher secondary school, which is run by government of Madhya Pradesh
