= Gaurishankar Agrawal =

Indian politician

Speaker of Chhattisgarh Legislative Assembly
- In office 6 January 2014 – 17 December 2018
- Governor: Shekhar Dutt; Ram Naresh Yadav (Acting); Balram Das Tandon; Anandiben Patel (Additional charge)
- Chief minister: Raman Singh
- Preceded by: Dharamlal Kaushik
- Succeeded by: Charan Das Mahant

Member of Legislative Assembly for Kasdol
- In office 9 December 2013 – 11 December 2018
- Preceded by: Raj Kamal Singhania, INC
- Succeeded by: Shakuntala Sahu, INC
- In office 1998–2003
- Preceded by: Kanahaiya Lal Sharma
- Succeeded by: Raj Kamal Singhania, INC

Personal details
- Born: 16 June 1952 (age 74) Bilaigarh, Baloda Bazar, Chhattisgarh, India
- Party: Bharatiya Janata Party
- Education: National Institute of Technology, Raipur
- Occupation: Politician, businessman

Gaurishankar Agrawal (born 16 June 1952) is an Indian politician who served as the speaker of the 3rd Chhattisgarh Legislative Assembly. He is a member of the Bharatiya Janata Party and was elected to the assembly from the Kasdol constituency.
