= Baloda Bazar-Bhatapara district =

- District
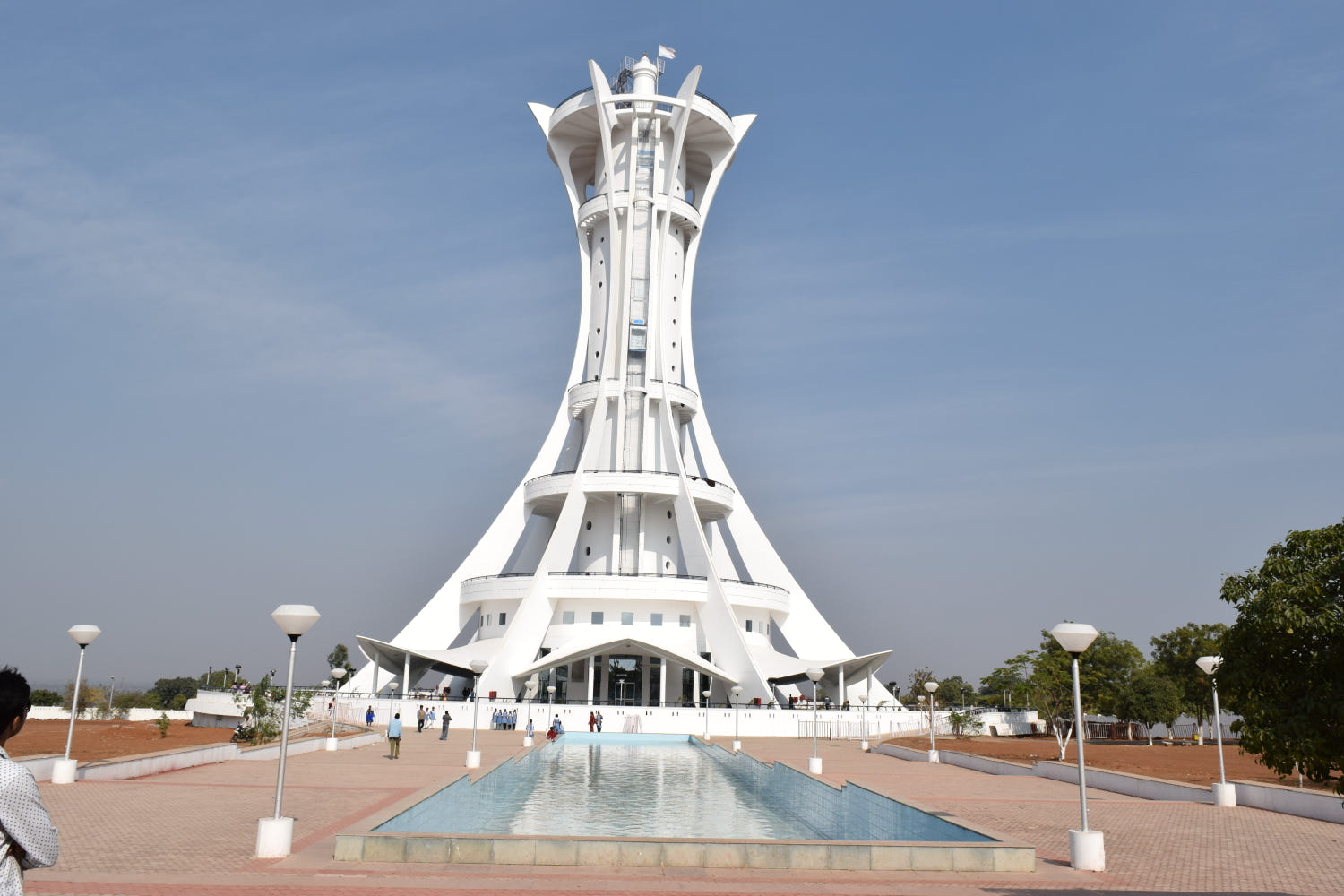
- Girodpuri Dham

- Location in Chhattisgarh
- Coordinates: 21.67°N 82.17°E
- Country: India
- State: Chhattisgarh
- Division: Raipur

Area
  - Total: 3,733.87 km^{2} (1,441.66 sq mi)

Population (2011)
  - Total: 1,078,911
  - Density: 288.952/km^{2} (748.383/sq mi)
- Time zone: UTC+05:30 (IST)

Baloda Bazar-Bhatapara district is a district in Chhattisgarh state of India with its headquarters at Baloda Bazar. Before its creation, it was a part of Raipur district. The border of Balodabazar-Bhatapara district shares borders with Bemetara, Mungeli, Bilaspur, Janjgir, Raigarh, Mahasamund and Raipur districts. According to the prevalent tradition in relation to the naming of the Balodabazar in the past, the traders of Gujarat, Haryana, Maharashtra, Orissa, Berar etc. used to gather in the market buffaloes of the city to sell the buffalo, buffalo (Boda). As a result, its name became popular in the name of the bullboda market and in the form of the Baloda Bazar.

== Administration ==
The district is subdivided into five tehsils: namely Palari, Baloda Bazar, Kasdol, Bhatapara and Simga and 3 subdivisions namely Baloda Bazar, Bhatapara and Bilaigarh.

The district administration is headed by the district magistrate cum collector, the present Collector and District Magistrate to take charge of the newly formed district is Kuldeep Sharma.

== Landmarks ==
The district is home to several landmarks of religious importance. The Kabeer Panth Ashram is located in the village of Damakheda, where Agardas Swami, the 12th Guru of Kabirpanth, established Kabir Math. Near the tomb, structures such as the Kabir hut and other buildings have been erected.

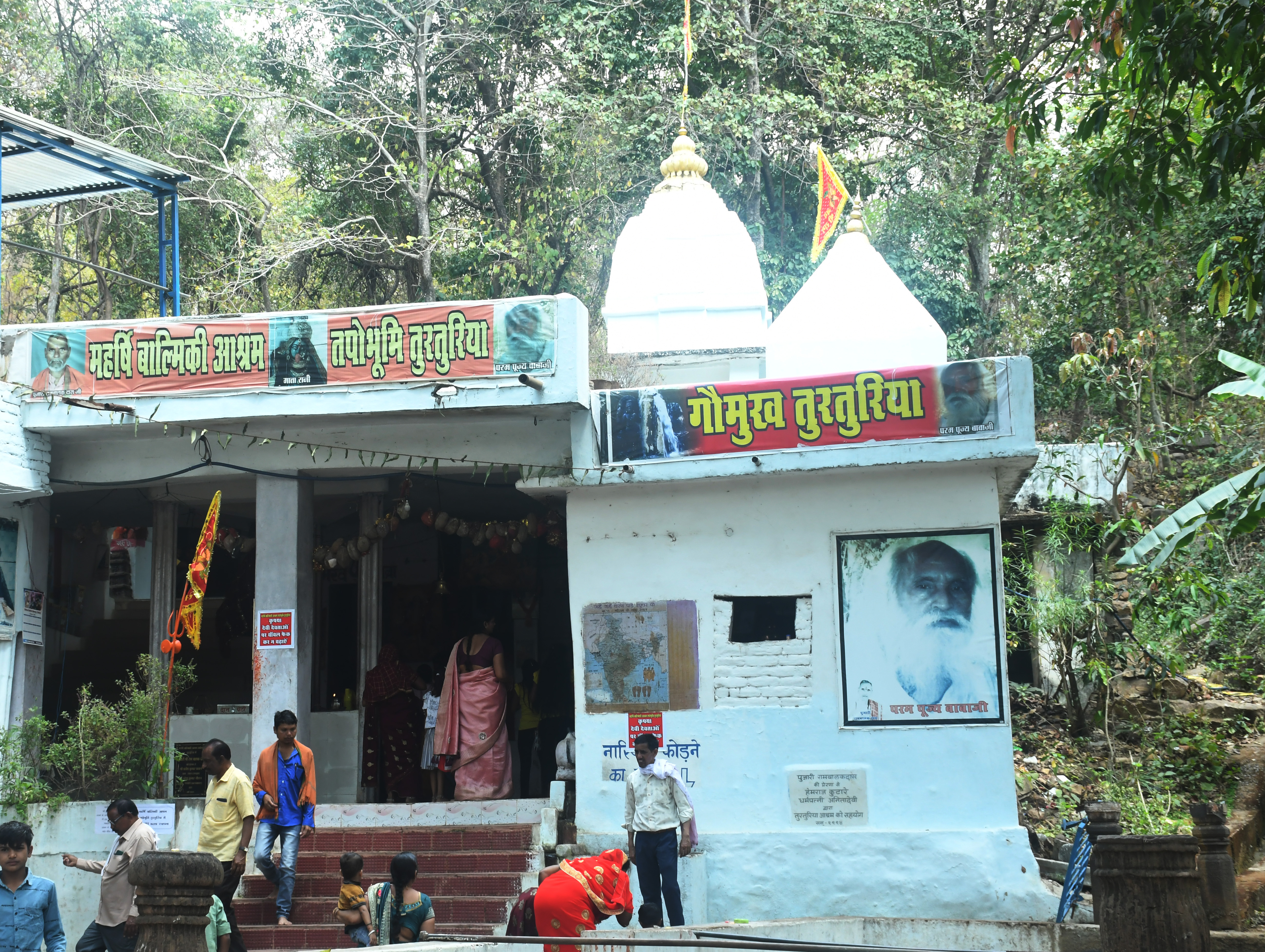
Valmiki Ashram Mandir, Turturiya reconstructed by Chintaram Tikariha in 1960s

Giroudpuri Dham is positioned at the confluence of the Mahanadi and Jonk rivers, approximately 29 kilometers from Balodabazar and 84 kilometers from Raipur and is a pilgrimage site. It is believed to be the birthplace of Guru Ghasidas, the founder of the Satnami Panth in Chhattisgarh. Devotees visit to pay their respects at his ‘seat’, situated adjacent to the Jait Khamba.

Turturiya Dham is also a well-known pilgrimage destination and is of spiritual and historical relevance. The Valmiki Ashram, the site where the sage Valmiki is believed to have composed the Ramayana, is the main attraction at Turturiya Dham. The ancient temple on the premises was restored in the mid-20th century by Chintaram Tikariha.

== Demographics ==
Religions in Baloda Bazar district (2011)
Religion	Percent
Hinduism	97.82%
Islam	0.81%
Other (tribal religion)	0.69%
Other or not stated	0.68%
Distribution of religions

At the time of the 2011 census, Baloda Bazar district had a population of 1,078,911, of which 150,268 (13.93%) live in urban areas. Baloda Bazar district has a sex ratio of 1003 females to 1000 males. Scheduled Castes and Scheduled Tribes make up 229,792 (21.30%) and 148,349 (13.75%) of the population respectively.

Languages of Baloda Bazar district (2011)
1. Chhattisgarhi (93.3%)
2. Hindi (5.16%)
3. Others (1.53%)

At the time of the 2011 Census of India, 93.31% of the population in the district spoke Chhattisgarhi and 5.16% Hindi as their first language.
