= Kanker Lok Sabha constituency =

Lok Sabha constituency in Chhattisgarh, India

Coordinates: 20.3°N 81.5°E

Kanker CG-11
- Lok Sabha constituency

Constituency details
- Country: India
- Region: Central India
- State: Chhattisgarh
- Assembly constituencies: Sihawa; Sanjari Balod; Dondi Lohara; Gunderdehi; Antagarh; Bhanupratappur; Kanker; Keshkal
- Established: 1967
- Total electors: 16,54,440
- Reservation: ST

Member of Parliament
- 18th Lok Sabha
- Incumbent Bhojraj Nag
- Party: Bharatiya Janata Party
- Elected year: 2024

Kanker is a Lok Sabha parliamentary constituency in Chhattisgarh.

== Assembly segments ==
Kanker Lok Sabha constituency is reserved for Scheduled Tribes (ST) candidates. It is composed of the following assembly segments:

#	Name	District	Member	Party	Leading (in 2024)
56	Sihawa (ST)	Dhamtari	Ambika Markam	INC	BJP
59	Sanjari Balod	Balod	Sangeeta Sinha	INC	BJP
60	Dondi Lohara (ST)	Balod	Anila Bhendiya	INC	INC
61	Gunderdehi	Balod	Kunwer Singh Nishad	INC	BJP
79	Antagarh (ST)	Kanker	Vikram Usendi	BJP	BJP
80	Bhanupratappur (ST)	Kanker	Savitri Manoj Mandavi	INC	INC
81	Kanker (ST)	Kanker	Asharam Netam	BJP	INC
82	Keshkal (ST)	Kondagaon	Neelkanth Tekam	BJP	INC

== Members of Parliament ==
Year	Member	Party
1967	Trilokshah Lal Priendra Shah	Bharatiya Jana Sangh
1971	Arvind Netam	Indian National Congress
1977	Aghan Singh Thakur	Janata Party
1980	Arvind Netam	Indian National Congress
1984	Arvind Netam	Indian National Congress
1989	Arvind Netam	Indian National Congress
1991	Arvind Netam	Indian National Congress
1996	Chhabila Netam	Indian National Congress
1998	Sohan Potai	Bharatiya Janata Party
1999	Sohan Potai	Bharatiya Janata Party
2004	Sohan Potai	Bharatiya Janata Party
2009	Sohan Potai	Bharatiya Janata Party
2014	Vikram Usendi	Bharatiya Janata Party
2019	Mohan Mandavi	Bharatiya Janata Party
2024	Bhojraj Nag	Bharatiya Janata Party

== Election results ==
=== 2024 ===
2024 Indian general election: Kanker
Party	Candidate	Votes	%	±%
BJP	Bhojraj Nag	597,624	47.23	
INC	Biresh Thakur	5,95,740	47.08	
NOTA	None of the above	18,669	1.48	
BSP	Tilak Ram Markam	11,770	0.93	
GGP	Sukchand Tekam	8,723	0.69	
Majority		1,884	0.15	
Turnout		12,67,551	76.39	▲2.07
BJP hold		Swing		

=== 2019 ===
2019 Indian general elections: Kanker
Party	Candidate	Votes	%	±%
BJP	Mohan Mandavi	546,233	47.12	▲1.37
INC	Biresh Thakur	5,39,319	46.53	▲4.24
NOTA	None of the Above	26,713	2.30	▼0.84
IND.	Harisingh Sidar	11,449	0.99	N/A
BSP	Sube Singh Dhurva	10,124	0.87	N/A
Majority		6,914	0.59	▼2.87
Turnout		11,60,243	74.42	▲4.20
BJP hold		Swing		

=== General election 2014 ===
2014 Indian general elections: Kanker
Party	Candidate	Votes	%	±%
BJP	Vikram Usendi	465,215	45.75	▼0.22
INC	Phulo Devi Netam	4,30,057	42.29	▼1.08
NOTA	None of the Above	31,917	3.14	N/A
CPI	Ramesh Gawde	23,482	2.31	N/A
IND.	Mahendra Gawade	14,139	1.94	N/A
Majority		35,158	3.46	▲0.86
Turnout		10,17,080	70.22	▲13.02
BJP hold		Swing		

=== General election 2009 ===
2009 Indian general elections: Kanker
Party	Candidate	Votes	%	±%
BJP	Sohan Potai	341,131	45.97	
INC	Phulo Devi Netam	3,21,843	43.37	
IND.	Mayaram Netam (Fulsingh Siladar)	21,022	2.83	
BSP	Mira Salam	13,709	1.85	
Majority		19,288	2.60	
Turnout		7,41,792	57.20	
BJP hold		Swing		

== See also ==
- Kanker
- List of constituencies of the Lok Sabha
