= Alor, Chhattisgarh =

Alor Allur
- Village
- Location in Chhattisgarh, India
- Coordinates: 19.81°N 81.52°E
- Country: India
- State: Chhattisgarh
- District: Kondagaon
- Elevation: 325 m (1,066 ft)

Languages
  - Official: Chhattisgarhi
- Time zone: UTC+5:30 (IST)
- PIN: 494228
- Telephone code: 07784

Alor or Allur is a village in Chhattisgarh, India.

== Geography ==
Alor is located at 19.81°N 81.52°E. The village was originally part of Raipur district as part of British central province. When Bastar district is created, it became part of Farasgaon Tehsil of Bastar district in Chhattisgarh, India. It is situated 10 km away from Farasgaon and 92 km away from district headquarter Jagdalpur and 180 km away from state capital Raipur. When a new district Kondagaon was created, it became part of Kondagaon district.
