= Gunderdehi Assembly constituency =

Legislative Assembly constituency in Chhattisgarh State, India

Coordinates: 20.94°N 81.29°E

Gunderdehi
- Constituency No. 61 for the Chhattisgarh Legislative Assembly

Constituency details
- Country: India
- Region: Central India
- State: Chhattisgarh
- District: Balod
- Lok Sabha constituency: Kanker
- Established: 1972
- Total electors: 244,682
- Reservation: None

Member of Legislative Assembly
- 6th Chhattisgarh Legislative Assembly
- Incumbent Kunwer Singh Nishad
- Party: Indian National Congress
- Elected year: 2023

Gunderdehi is one of the 90 Legislative Assembly constituencies of Chhattisgarh state in India. It is in Balod district and is a part of Kanker Lok Sabha constituency.

== Members of Legislative Assembly ==
=== Madhya Pradesh Assembly ===
Year	Member	Party
Madhya Pradesh Legislative Assembly
Prior to 1961: Constituency did not exist
1962	Udai Ram	Indian National Congress
1967	W. Chandrakar	Indian National Congress
1972	Ghanaram Sahu	Independent politician
1977	Ghanaram Sahu	Indian National Congress
1980	Harihar Prasad Sharma	Indian National Congress
1985	Harihar Prasad Sharma	Indian National Congress
1990	Tarachand Sahu	Bharatiya Janata Party
1993	Tarachand Sahu	Bharatiya Janata Party
1998	Ghana Ram Sahu	Indian National Congress
Chhattisgarh Legislative Assembly
2003	Ramshila Sahu	Bharatiya Janata Party
2008	Virendra Kumar Sahu	Bharatiya Janata Party
2013	Rajendra Kumar Rai	Indian National Congress
2018	Kunwer Singh Nishad	Indian National Congress
2023	Kunwer Singh Nishad	Indian National Congress

== Election results ==
=== 2023 ===
2023 Chhattisgarh Legislative Assembly election: Gunderdehi
Party	Candidate	Votes	%	±%
INC	Kunwer Singh Nishad	103,191	50.35	−8.76
BJP	Virendra Sahu	88,328	43.10	+13.65
AAP	Jaswant Sinha	3,232	1.58	
NOTA	None of the Above	1,868	0.91	−1.78
Majority		14,863	7.25	−22.41
Turnout		204,947	83.76	+0.67
INC hold		Swing		

=== 2018 ===
Chhattisgarh Legislative Assembly Election, 2018: Gunderdehi
Party	Candidate	Votes	%	±%
INC	Kunwer Singh Nishad	110,369	59.11	
BJP	Deepak Tarachand Sahu	54,975	29.45	
JCC	Rajendra Kumar Rai	8,648	4.63	New
Independent	Raman Kumar Sahu	1,835	0.98	
NOTA	None of the Above	5,014	2.69	
Majority		55,394	29.66	
Turnout		186,704	83.09	
INC hold		Swing		

== See also ==
- List of constituencies of the Chhattisgarh Legislative Assembly
- Gunderdehi
- Balod district
- Kanker (Lok Sabha constituency)
