= Kanker =

Kanker may refer to:

- Kanker, Chhattisgarh, a city in Chhattisgarh, India
  - Kanker district, district in the state of Chhattisgarh, India with the city as its capital
  - Kanker State, an Indian princely state during the British Raj, based in the city
  - Kanker (Lok Sabha constituency)
  - Kanker (Vidhan Sabha constituency)
- The Kanker sisters, a trio of characters from the cartoon Ed, Edd n Eddy
- The Dutch or Indonesian word for cancer

== See also ==
- Canker, many different plant diseases
