= Tandula River =

River in India

Coordinates: 21°06′N 81°14′E

The Tandula River runs through the Balod and Durg districts of the state of Chhattisgarh in India, allowing villages in the district to use its water for irrigation. It originates from Bhanupratappur district, Kanker, Chhattisgarh. It flows to the Tandula Dam near Balod, which supplies water for the local Bhilai Steel Plant. The dam which also impounds the River Sukha was constructed in 1912. It is a tributary of Shivnath River which drains into the Mahanadi.
