= Pharasgaon =

Pharasgaon farasgaon
- town
- Location within Chhattisgarh Location within India
- Coordinates: 19°51′46″N 81°38′13″E
- Country: India
- State: Chhattisgarh
- District: Bastar

Government
  - Type: nagar panchayat
- Elevation: 618 m (2,028 ft)

Languages
  - Official: Hindi, Chhattisgarhi
- Time zone: UTC+5:30 (IST)
- Postal code: 494228
- Vehicle registration: CG

Pharasgaon or Parasgaon is a town in Kondagaon district, Chhattisgarh, India.

== Geography ==
It is located at 19°51′46″N 81°38′13″E at an altitude of 618 m.

== Location ==
National Highway 30 passes through Pharasgaon. Nearest airport is Raipur Airport and nearest railway station is at Jagdalpur.

Kandagaon is 30 km south and Keskal 25 km north of Pharasgaon.

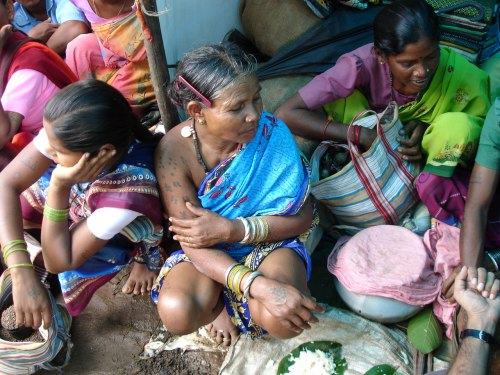
Weekly Village Market of Pharasgaon
