= Keshkal Assembly constituency =

Legislative Assembly constituency in Chhattisgarh State, India

Coordinates: 20.09°N 81.59°E

Keshkal
- Constituency No. 82 for the Chhattisgarh Legislative Assembly

Constituency details
- Country: India
- Region: Central India
- State: Chhattisgarh
- District: Kondagaon
- Lok Sabha constituency: Kanker
- Established: 1951
- Total electors: 207,062
- Reservation: ST

Member of Legislative Assembly
- 6th Chhattisgarh Legislative Assembly
- Incumbent Neelkanth Tekam
- Party: Bharatiya Janata Party
- Elected year: 2023
- Preceded by: Sant Ram Netam

Keshkal is one of the 90 Legislative Assembly constituencies of Chhattisgarh state in India.

It is part of Kondagaon district and is reserved for candidates belonging to the Scheduled Tribes.

== Members of the Legislative Assembly ==
Year	Member	Party
Madhya Pradesh Legislative Assembly
1952	Rajman	Independent politician
1957	Saraduram	Indian National Congress
1962	Manku Ram Sodi	Independent politician
1967	N Moda	Bharatiya Jana Sangh
1972	Ganga Ram Rana	Indian National Congress
1977	Mangli Jhadu Ram	Janata Party
1980	Lamodar Baliar	Indian National Congress
1985	Shiv Netam	Indian National Congress
1990	Krishna Kumar Dhruw	Bharatiya Janata Party
1993	Mahesh Baghel	Bharatiya Janata Party
1998	Phulo Devi Netam	Indian National Congress
Chhattisgarh Legislative Assembly
2003	Mahesh Baghel	Bharatiya Janata Party
2008	Sewakram Netam	Bharatiya Janata Party
2013	Sant Ram Netam	Indian National Congress
2018	Sant Ram Netam	Indian National Congress
2023	Neelkanth Tekam	Bharatiya Janata Party

== Election results ==
=== 2023 ===
2023 Chhattisgarh Legislative Assembly election: Keshkal
Party	Candidate	Votes	%	±%
BJP	Neelkanth Tekam	77,438	45.39	+8.22
INC	Sant Ram Netam	71,878	42.13	−6.20
AAP	Jugal Kishor Bodh	4,216	2.47	−0.76
API	Sonsingh Marapi	3,048	1.79	
Hamar Raj Party	Shiv Kumar Gangwal	2,509	1.47	
Independent	Santosh Kumar Mandavi	1,686	0.99	
NOTA	None of the Above	4,335	2.54	−1.48
Majority		5,560	3.26	−7.90
Turnout		170,604	82.39	+0.58
BJP gain from INC		Swing		

=== 2018 ===
Chhattisgarh Legislative Assembly Election, 2018: Keshkal
Party	Candidate	Votes	%	±%
INC	Sant Ram Netam	73,470	48.33	
BJP	Harishankar Netam	56,498	37.17	
BSP	Jugalkishor Bodh	4,903	3.23	
AAP	Kamlesh Kumar Salam	2,791	1.84	
CPI	Radhika Sodi	2,180	1.43	
Independent	Suresh Kumar Netam	2,078	1.37	
JD(U)	Bindesh Rana	2,008	1.32	
Independent	Hirau Ram Shori	1,963	1.29	
NOTA	None of the Above	6,113	4.02	
Majority		16,972	11.16	
Turnout		151,589	81.81	
INC hold		Swing		

== See also ==
- List of constituencies of the Chhattisgarh Legislative Assembly
- Kondagaon district
