= Chhabila Netam =

Indian politician

Member of the 11th Lok Sabha for Kanker
- In office 1996–1998
- Preceded by: Arvind Netam
- Succeeded by: Sohan Potai
- Majority: 24,420

Personal details
- Born: 22 May 1948 (age 78) Bhaismundi, Bastar district, Chhattisgarh, India
- Party: Indian National Congress

Chhabila Arvind Netam (born 22 May 1948) is an Indian National Congress politician and member of the 11th Lok Sabha from the Kanker reserved constituency.

== Early life ==
Chhabila was born on 22 May 1948 in Bhaismundi village of Bastar district and did her matriculation from a local government school.

== Career ==
During the 1996 Indian general election, the Indian National Congress (INC) party denied a ticket to Arvind Netam because his name surfaced in the Hawala scandal and instead made his wife Chhabila its official candidate. She polled 219,191 votes and defeated Sohan Potai of Bharatiya Janata Party (194,771 votes) to become the Member of Parliament from Kanker seat reserved for scheduled tribes. However the house was dissolved well within one and a half years and Netam did not contest the election held in 1998. She stood in the 1999 Indian general election but lost to Potai by a difference of 88,191 votes.

== Personal life ==
Chhabila married Netam in May 1969 and together they have four children; two sons and two daughters. One of their daughters, Preeti Netam contested the 2008 Chhattisgarh Legislative Assembly election.
