= Rajendra Kumar Rai =

Rajendra Kumar Rai may refer to:

- Rajendra Kumar Rai (Indian politician)
- Rajendra Kumar Rai (Nepalese politician)
- Rajendra Kumar Rai (Nepalese politician, born 1964)
