= Hatkachora =

- Census town
- Location within Chhattisgarh Location within India
- Coordinates: 19.05431°N 82.03374°E
- Country: India
- State: Chhattisgarh
- District: Bastar

Population (2001)
  - Total: 6,054

Languages
  - Official: Hindi, Chhattisgarhi
- Time zone: UTC+5:30 (IST)
- Vehicle registration: CG

Hatkachora is a census town in Bastar district in the Indian state of Chhattisgarh.

== Demographics ==
As of 2001 India census, Hatkachora had a population of 6054. Males constitute 51% of the population and females 49%. Hatkachora has an average literacy rate of 64%, higher than the national average of 59.5%: male literacy is 72%, and female literacy is 56%. In Hatkachora, 13% of the population is under 6 years of age.
