= Aamaguhan, Chhattisgarh =

Aamaguhan
- Village
- Interactive map of Aamaguhan
- Coordinates: 20.1163°N 81.7158°E
- Country: India
- State: Chhattisgarh
- District: Bastar district
- Tehsil: Bade Rajpur

Aamaguhan is a settlement situated in Bade Rajpur Tehsil of Bastar District in the Indian state of Chhattisgarh. It is a medium-sized village that comes under the Gram Panchayat of Baijanpuri and Baderajpur (Janpad Panchayat), with Kondagaon as its Zilla Panchayat.

== Government ==
Aamaguhan falls under the Lok Sabha Constituency of Bastar, which is reserved for Scheduled Tribes (ST) candidates. Sarpanch (Head of Village Council) administers the village as an elective representative according to Constitution of India and Panchyati Raaj Act.

== Demographics ==
Aamaguhan has a total of 140 resident families, according to 2011 census. The population was about 658 including 329 males and about 329 females. Children under 6 number 128 or 19% of the population. Male literacy rate is 67% and the female literacy rate was 42% totaling 54%, lower than the state's average literacy rate of 70%. Average Sex Ratio of the village is 1000, higher that the state, whereas the Child Sex Ratio for the Aamaguhan is 969, equivalent to the state average.

== Facilities ==
There is one primary and one high school in the village with no hospital but a dispensary is present.

== Transport ==
The nearest railway station is Jagdalpur JDB. The nearest airport is Swami Vivekananda Airport, Raipur.
