= Frezarpur =

- Census town
- Location within Chhattisgarh Location within India
- Coordinates: 19.06394°N 82.06403°E
- Country: India
- State: Chhattisgarh
- District: Bastar

Population (2001)
  - Total: 9,630

Languages
  - Official: Hindi, Chhattisgarhi
- Time zone: UTC+5:30 (IST)
- Vehicle registration: CG

Frezarpur is a census town in Bastar district in the state of Chhattisgarh, India.

== Demographics ==
As of 2001 India census, Frezarpur had a population of 9630. Males constitute 51% of the population and females 49%. Frezarpur has an average literacy rate of 76%, higher than the national average of 59.5%: male literacy is 83%, and female literacy is 69%. In Frezarpur, 11% of the population is under 6 years of age.
