= Bastar wooden craft =

Traditional crafts in India

Wooden crafts of Chhattisgarh
- Geographical indication
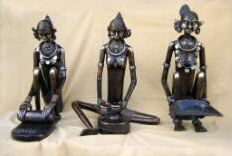
- Type: Handicraft
- Area: Bastar district, Chhattisgarh
- Country: India
- Registered: 2008–2009
- Material: Wood

Bastar wooden crafts are traditional Indian wooden crafts that are manufactured in the Bastar district of Chhattisgarh state, India. The wood-crafting work has been protected under the Geographical indication (GI) of the Agreement on Trade-Related Aspects of Intellectual Property Rights (TRIPS) agreement. It is listed at item 84 as "Bastar Wooden Craft" of the GI Act 1999 of the Government of India with registration confirmed by the Controller General of Patents Designs and Trademarks.

Chhattisgarh, especially Bastar people have excellent skills in variety of craft work including Dhokra, bamboo craft, wrought iron craft, tribal dress, traditional textile, Kantha embroidery, terracotta, tribal painting, bell metal, etc. Their skills have been recognized by national and state awards. Badhai people are skilled in this woodcraft work and they are divided into two groups. One group make agricultural instruments and other group make decorative and totemic pillars. Another community, knows as Muria people also has woodcarving skills. The Murias are best in craftsmanship. Their skill apply in various objects that from small to big. They turn craft skills into interpretation of basic lifestyles and basic routines of life such as chaffing of paddy, grinding grains, etc. They express their culture and religious faiths into craft art that reflect through gods, goddess, music culture of the community and wildlife. The craft work heavily depended as hand-made where there is no machinery usage or rare use in particular areas only.

In 2024, Bastar wooden craft was exhibited at the Durbar Hall Art Gallery in Bhopal during the Chhattisgarh Handicrafts Showcase. The exhibit featured tribal woodcraft items, drawing praise for preserving indigenous craftsmanship.

Bastar craftsmen use teak wood, Indian Rosewood, and whitewood among others to craft various handicraft items. Bastar Wooden Craft has been exhibited at "Durbar Hall Art Gallery".

== See also ==
- Kinnal Craft
- Channapatna toys
- List of Geographical Indications in India
