= Neelkanth Tekam =

Indian politician

Neelkanth Tekam (born 1968) is an Indian politician from Chhattisgarh. He is an MLA from Keshkal Assembly constituency, which is reserved for the Scheduled Tribes community, in Kondagaon District. He won the 2023 Chhattisgarh Legislative Assembly election, representing the Bharatiya Janata Party.

== Early life and education ==
Tekam is from Keshkal, Kondagaon District, Chhattisgarh. He is the son of Jeevaram Tekam. He completed his M.A. in 1989 at Pandit Ravisankhar Shukla University. He was an Indian Administrative Service officer. He resigned and joined BJP before the elections.

== Career ==
Tekam won from Keshkal Assembly constituency representing the Bharatiya Janata Party in the 2023 Chhattisgarh Legislative Assembly election. He polled 77,438 votes and defeated his nearest rival, Sant Ram Netam of Indian National Congress, by a margin of 5,560 votes.
