= Sanjari Balod Assembly constituency =

Legislative Assembly constituency in Chhattisgarh State, India

Coordinates: 20.85°N 81.03°E

Sanjari Balod
- Constituency No. 59 for the Chhattisgarh Legislative Assembly

Constituency details
- Country: India
- Region: Central India
- State: Chhattisgarh
- District: Balod
- Lok Sabha constituency: Kanker
- Established: 2008
- Total electors: 225,116
- Reservation: None

Member of Legislative Assembly
- 6th Chhattisgarh Legislative Assembly
- Incumbent Sangeeta Sinha
- Party: Indian National Congress
- Elected year: 2023
- Preceded by: Bhaiyaram Sinha

Sanjari Balod is one of the 90 Legislative Assembly constituencies of Chhattisgarh state in India. It is in Balod district. It was previously called Balod constituency.

== Members of the Legislative Assembly ==
Year	Member	Party
Madhya Pradesh Legislative Assembly
1952	Darambai	Indian National Congress
1952	Kesholal Gomasta	Indian National Congress
1957	Kesholal Gomasta	Indian National Congress
1962	Kesholal Gomasta	Indian National Congress
1967	Hiralal Sonboir	Indian National Congress
1972	Hiralal Sonboir	Indian National Congress
1977	Mishrilal Khatri	Independent politician
1980	Hiralal Sonboir	Indian National Congress
1985	Jalam Singh Patel	Indian National Congress
1990	Jalam Singh Patel	Indian National Congress
1993	Jalam Singh Patel	Indian National Congress
1998	Lokendra Yadav	Bharatiya Janata Party
Chhattisgarh Legislative Assembly
2003	Pritam Sahu	Bharatiya Janata Party
2008: Constituency renamed Sanjari-Balod
2008	Madanlal Sahu	Bharatiya Janata Party
2013	Bhaiyaram Sinha	Indian National Congress
2018	Sangeeta Sinha	Indian National Congress
2023	Sangeeta Sinha	Indian National Congress

== Election results ==
=== 2023 ===
2023 Chhattisgarh Legislative Assembly election: Sanjari Balod
Party	Candidate	Votes	%	±%
INC	Sangeeta Sinha	84,649	44.20	−7.33
BJP	Rakesh Kumar Yadav	67,603	35.30	−0.57
Independent	Meena Satyendra Sahu	27,169	14.19	
Independent	Vinod Kumar Nagvanshi	2,777	1.45	
Majority		17,046	8.90	−6.76
Turnout		191,505	85.07	+0.86
INC hold		Swing		

=== 2018 ===
Chhattisgarh Legislative Assembly Election, 2018: Sanjari Balod
Party	Candidate	Votes	%	±%
INC	Sangeeta Sinha	90,428	51.53	
BJP	Pawan Sahu	62,940	35.87	
JCC	Arjun Hirwani	12,664	7.22	
Independent	Bhupesh Kumar Sahu	2,401	1.37	
AAP	Kamini Dhurve	1,770	1.01	
NOTA	None of the Above	2,913	1.66	
Majority		27,488	15.66	
Turnout		175,471	84.21	
INC hold		Swing		

== See also ==
- List of constituencies of the Chhattisgarh Legislative Assembly
- Balod district
- Raipur
