= Shamshad Begum (disambiguation) =

Shamshad Begum (1919–2013) was an Indian singer.

Shamshad Begum may also refer to:

- Shamshad Begum (social worker), an Indian social worker
- Ragni (actress) (1924–2007), born Shamshad Begum, an Indian actress
