= Kunwer Singh Nishad =

Indian politician (born 1971)

Kunwer Singh Nishad (born 1971) is an Indian politician from Chhattisgarh who is an MLA from Gunderdehi Assembly constituency in Balod District. He won the 2023 Chhattisgarh Legislative Assembly election, representing the Indian National Congress.

== Early life and education ==
Nishad is from Gunderdehi, Balod District, Chhattisgarh. He is the son of Dukhwaram. He completed his M.A. in 1995 at Pandit Ravishankar Shukla University, Raipur.

== Career ==
Nishad won from Gunderdehi Assembly constituency representing the Indian National Congress in the 2023 Chhattisgarh Legislative Assembly election. He polled 103,191 votes and defeated his nearest rival, Virendra Sahu of the Bharatiya Janata Party, by a margin of 14,863 votes. He first became an MLA winning the 2018 Chhattisgarh Legislative Assembly election defeating his nearest rival, Deepak Tarachand Sahu of the Bharatiya Janata Party, by a huge margin of 55,394 votes.
