= Dondi Lohara Assembly constituency =

Legislative Assembly constituency in Chhattisgarh State, India

Coordinates: 20.79°N 81.05°E

Dondi Lohara
- Constituency No. 60 for the Chhattisgarh Legislative Assembly

Constituency details
- Country: India
- Region: Central India
- State: Chhattisgarh
- District: Balod
- Lok Sabha constituency: Kanker
- Established: 2003
- Total electors: 221,829
- Reservation: ST

Member of Legislative Assembly
- 6th Chhattisgarh Legislative Assembly
- Incumbent Anila Bhediya
- Party: Indian National Congress
- Elected year: 2018
- Preceded by: Neelima Singh Tekam

Dondi Lohara is one of the 90 Legislative Assembly constituencies of Chhattisgarh state in India. It is in Balod district and is reserved for candidates belonging to the Scheduled Tribes.

== Members of Legislative Assembly ==
Year	Member	Party
Madhya Pradesh Legislative Assembly
Prior to 1956: Constituency did not exist
1957	Jhamit Kunwar	Indian National Congress
1962	Jhumuk Lal Bhediya	Indian National Congress
1967	Jhumuk Lal Bhediya	Indian National Congress
1972	Jhumuk Lal Bhediya	Indian National Congress
1977	Jhumuk Lal Bhediya	Indian National Congress
1980	Jhumuk Lal Bhediya	Indian National Congress
1985	Janak Lal Thakur	Independent politician
1990	Jhumuk Lal Bhediya	Indian National Congress
1993	Janak Lal Thakur	Chhattisgarh Mukti Morcha
1998	Domendra Bhendiya	Indian National Congress
Chhattisgarh Legislative Assembly
2003	Lal Mahendra Singh Tekam	Bharatiya Janata Party
2008	Neelima Singh Tekam	Bharatiya Janata Party
2013	Anila Bhediya	Indian National Congress
2018	Anila Bhediya	Indian National Congress
2023	Anila Bhediya	Indian National Congress

== Election results ==
=== 2023 ===
2023 Chhattisgarh Legislative Assembly election: Dondi Lohara
Party	Candidate	Votes	%	±%
INC	Anila Bhediya	102,762	56.43	+15.97
BJP	Devlal Halwa Thakur	67,183	36.89	+16.29
Hamar Raj Party	Girwar Singh Thakur	7,793	4.28	New
NOTA	None of the Above	3,126	1.72	−1.18
Majority		35,579	19.54	−0.32
Turnout		182,104	82.09	+1.17
INC hold		Swing		

=== 2018 ===
Chhattisgarh Legislative Assembly Election, 2018: Dondi Lohara
Party	Candidate	Votes	%	±%
INC	Anila Bhediya	67,448	40.46	
BJP	Lal Mahendra Singh Tekam	34,345	20.60	
Independent	Dev Lal Thakur	21,360	12.81	
Independent	Janak Lal Thakur	19,242	11.54	
JCC	Rajesh Churendra	13,929	8.36	
Independent	Hiteshwari Kothari	1,902	1.14	
NOTA	None of the Above	4,842	2.90	
Majority		33,103	19.86	
Turnout		166,703	80.92	
INC hold		Swing		

== See also ==
- List of constituencies of the Chhattisgarh Legislative Assembly
- Balod district
- Raipur
