= Shamshad Begum (social worker) =

Indian social worker

- Born: Balod, Chhattisgarh, India
- Occupation: Social worker
- Awards: Padma Shri
- Website: Official web site

Shamshad Begum is an Indian social worker, known for her efforts towards the education of backward communities of Chhattisgarh such as the Scheduled Caste, Scheduled Tribe and other backward communities. She was honoured by the Government of India, in 2012, with the fourth highest Indian civilian award of Padma Shri.

== Biography ==
Shamshad Begum comes from Balod district (formerly a part of the undivided Durg) in the Indian state of Chhattisgarh. As the president of a small village society operating in Gunderdehi block, Begum had an opportunity to get associated with the National Literacy Mission Programme of the Government of India and this paved the way for her entry into social service. It is reported that within six months of the launching of the Mission activities in Gunderdehi in 1995, Begum and her colleagues were able to make 12,269 women literate, out of the total 18265 illiterate women.

Begum carried on with her social work even after the campaign activities ended and took up other social causes such as fighting against illegal land encroachments and closing down of liquor shops. It is reported that Begum was successful in setting up 1041 self-help groups in Balod district. These groups, with their small savings, have accumulated a corpus from where needy members can avail loans for domestic emergencies. The total savings of these groups are reported to have exceeded US$ 2 million. The groups have since established cottage industries such as soap making and making wheels for bullock carts. They have also set up a Mahila Bhavan.

Shamshad Begum is associated with Sahyogi Jankalyan Samiti, a social welfare group, involved education and welfare activities of women and children. She has also been associated with National Bank for Agriculture and Rural Development (NABARD) for training of women in leadership skills and creating awareness against sex discrimination, prevention of child marriages and molestation.

Shamshad Begum was honored by the Government of India in 2012 with the award of Padma Shri.
