= Muria people =

Indian indigenous community of Gondi people primarily residing in Chhattisgarh

Muria Gond
- Location: Bastar, Kondagaon, Narayanpur district, Chhattisgarh, India
- Language: Gondi, Halbi, Bhattri
- Religion: Nature worship
- Surnames: Kashyap (Kacch), Netam, Baghel, Mourya

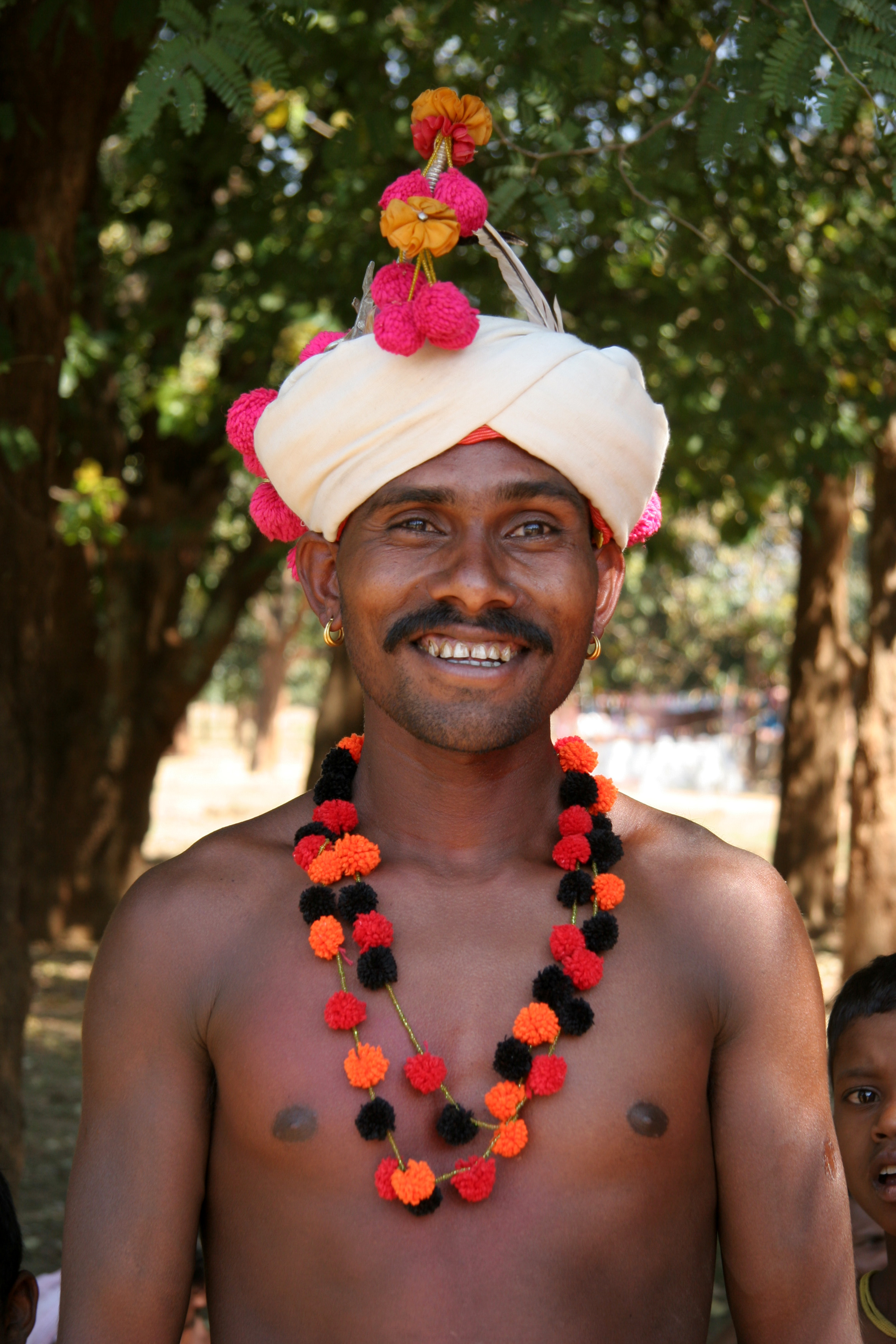
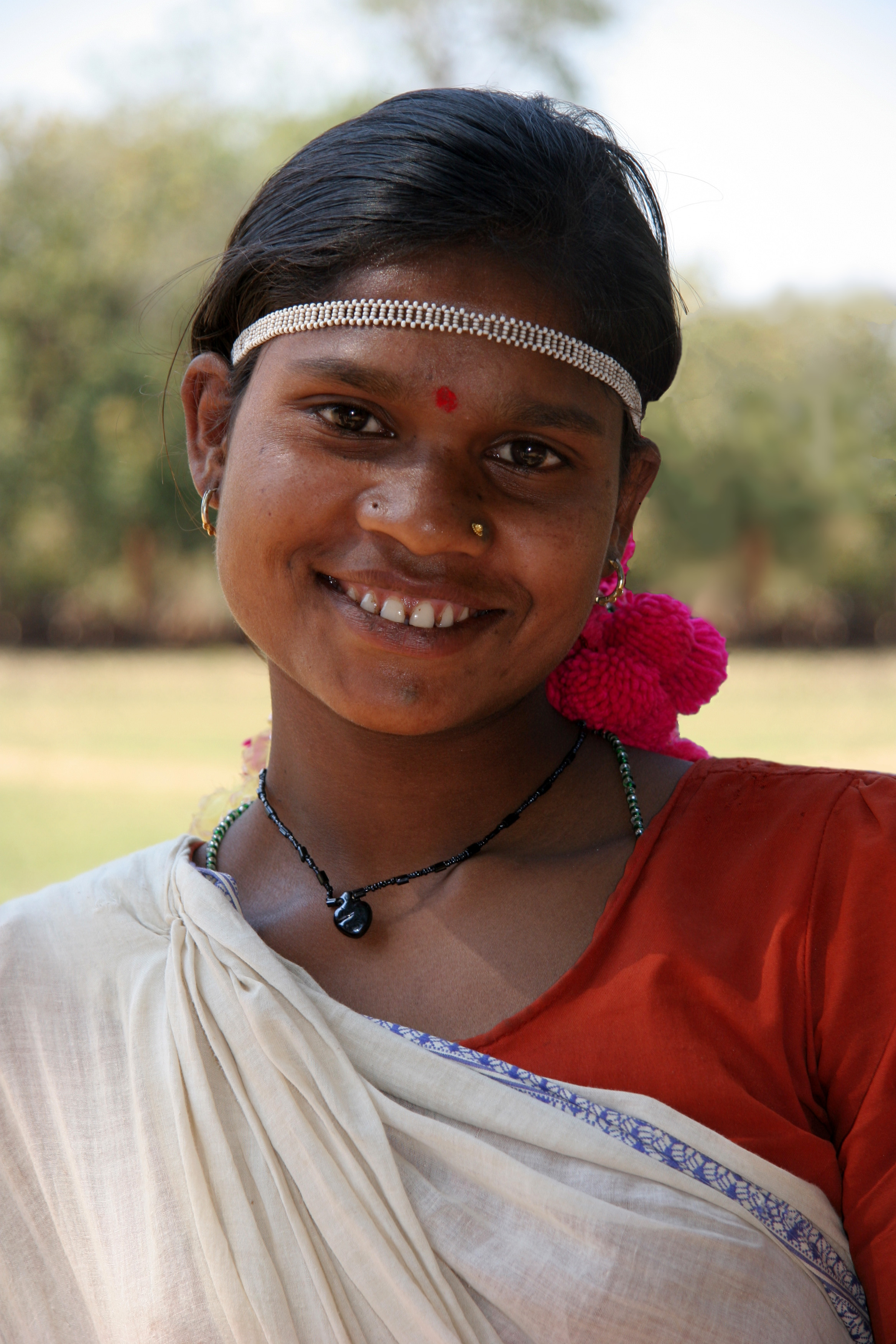
A Muria man and woman

The Muria (Gondi: [muɽijaː]) are an indigenous Adivasi, scheduled tribe Dravidian community of the Bastar district of Chhattisgarh, India. They are part of the Gondi people. Traditionally, they are economically homogeneous and strive to work as a collective. They have mixed-sex dormitories where adolescents are sent to practice premarital sex, sometimes with a single partner and sometimes serially. They have an omnivorous diet, with liquor playing a key role in social gatherings.

== Etymology ==
Shiva Tosh Das writes that the name Muria comes from the root word mur, which can be translated as either "root" or "permanent"; it may be based on the fact that the Muria are settled, unlike the nomadic Maria.

== Social structure ==
The Muria prioritise collectiveness. They are divided into five phratries:

- the Nagvans (Snake Race),
- the Kacchimvans (Tortoise Race),
- the Bakravans (Goat Race),
- the Baghvans (Tiger Race) and
- the Bodminkvans (Fish Race).

They are not allowed to eat their totem animal, and must mourn it if one dies.

== Costume ==
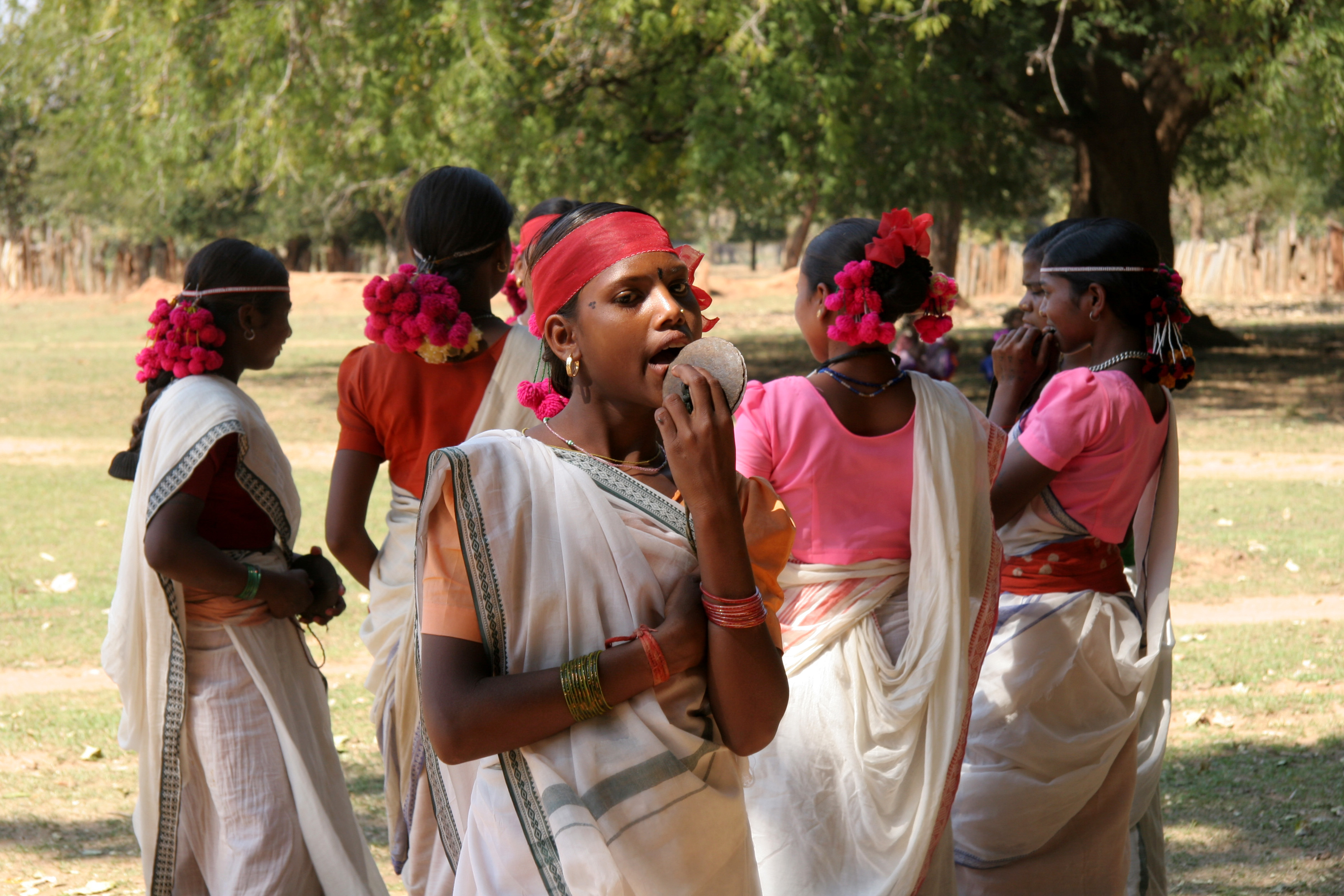
Muria women in dance costume

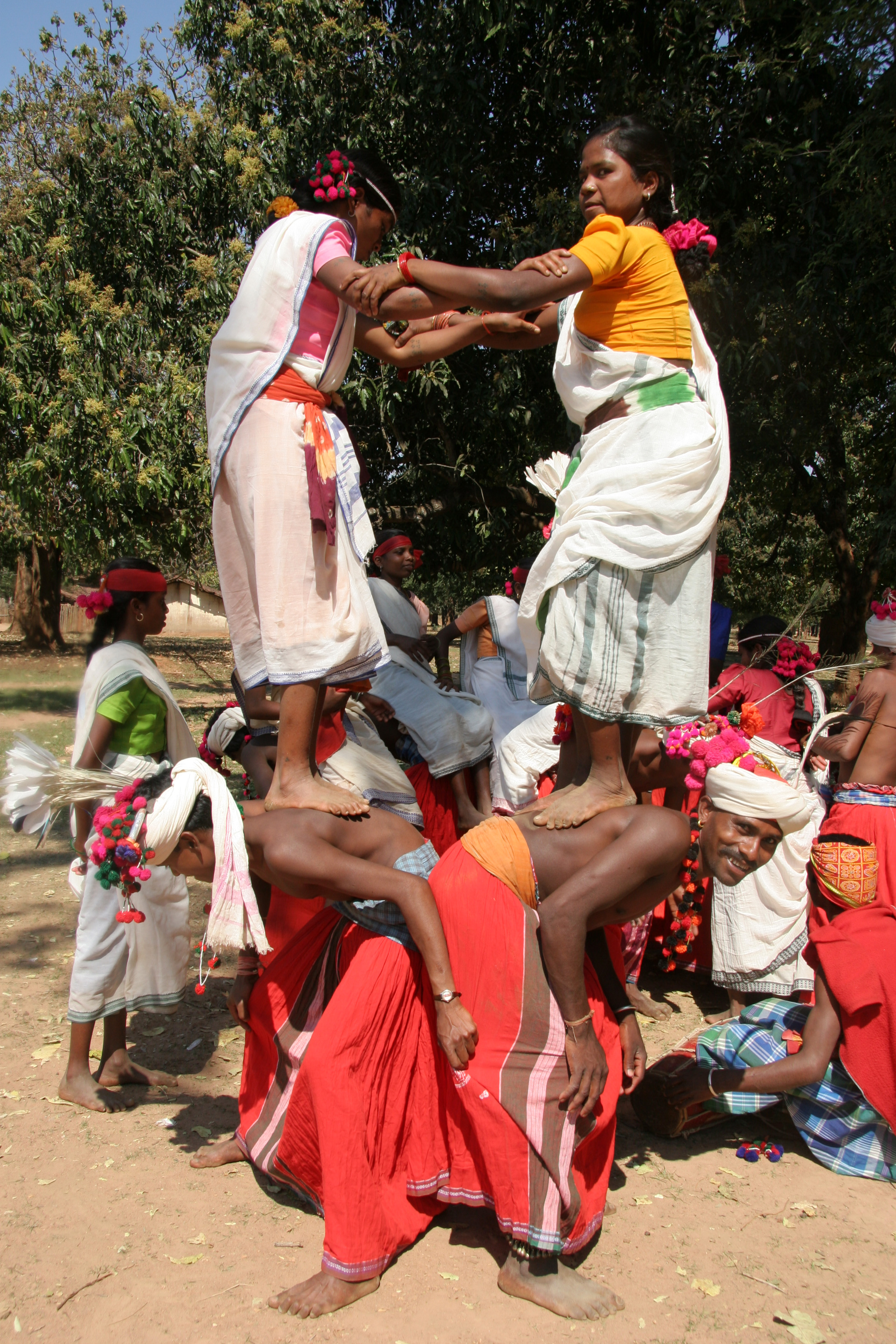
Muria dance in Bastar district

Male Muria wear clothing similar to that of the Chandrapur District, while the females often dress in simple garments that do not cover the breasts. The style of the garments appears to have been modified after contact with other tribes, as observed in the early 1980s.

== Location ==
The Muria live in the north-central part of Bastar district, north of the Indravati River, located in Chhattisgarh state in central India. They live in two administrative divisions: the Kondagaon District in the east and the Narayanpur District in the west.

== Economy ==
Compared to other Adivasi, the Muria are relatively prosperous. Their economic stratification has traditionally been homogeneous, with exceptional consumption outside of designated periods, such as feasts, viewed as "socially threatening, hubristic, and disruptive"; conspicuous wealth has been considered to cause more problems than it solves. Alfred Gell writes that the disparity between their perception of the ethics of consumption and modern production technology has caused some to have more wealth than they are willing to spend.

== Sexuality and marriage ==
The Muria embrace sexuality from a young age. Youths are sent to mixed-sex dormitories called ghotul, where they live in close quarters, and after turning 18 and 21 (for women and men, respectively) are expected to engage in sexual activities, up to and including intercourse; this expectation does not extend to group sex, which is discouraged. In some ghotul, adolescents are put in monogamous relationships; in others they are discouraged from becoming emotionally attached to their partners, and those who sleep together for more than three nights are punished. Although having privacy for intercourse is considered important, it is not deemed a necessity.

Prior to engagement, Muria men may freely engage in sexual intercourse with their mother's brother's daughter or father's sister's daughter, while women may do the same with their father's sister's son or mother's brother's son. However, this is not allowed after betrothal. Women may freely grab each other's breasts or exchange sexually themed jokes, a custom which becomes more common as they get older.

The Muria generally marry late and do not pay dowries. They are not allowed to marry from within their own clan, although a Muria man may marry his cousin. Cousin marriage is common, with Muria men often marrying their mother's brother's daughter or father's sister's daughter.

== Diet ==
The Muria are generally self-sufficient in producing and consuming Forest produce depends like fruits tendu, chhar, jam, bhelanwa, ber mango, dal, chickpeas, and lentils. Vegetables, including radishes, eggplant, chili, and tomatoes are eaten during important ceremonies; rice is also eaten at these times. Luxury foods for the Muria tend to be traditional. The Muria people drink a local form of liquor Mahuva, Selfi, which plays a key role in social and ritual gatherings.

== Religion ==
The Muria traditionally practice their folk religion, nature of worshipping, and Budhadev (Dev) God the deities of their respective village and clan, similar to Sarnaism.

== In popular culture ==
The Muria are featured in Arne Sucksdorff’s 1957 drama documentary, En Djungelsaga.
