= Bhojraj Nag =

Member of the Lok Sabha

Member of Parliament, Lok Sabha
- Incumbent
- Assumed office 4 June 2024
- Preceded by: Mohan Mandavi
- Constituency: Kanker

Member of Chhattisgarh Legislative Assembly
- In office 2014–2018
- Preceded by: Vikram Usendi
- Succeeded by: Anoop Nag
- Constituency: Antagarh Assembly constituency

Personal details
- Born: Bhojraj Nag; 7 April 1972 (age 54) Himoda, Kanker, Chhattisgarh
- Party: Bharatiya Janta Party
- Spouse: Sadhna Nag
- Children: 3 (2 sons, 1 daughter)
- Education: 9th Pass
- Occupation: Agriculture

Bhojraj Nag (born 7 April 1972) is an Indian politician. He has been elected to Lok Sabha from Kanker Lok Sabha constituency. He is a member of Bharatiya Janta Party.
