= Vikram Usendi =

Indian politician

Member of Chhattisgarh Legislative Assembly
- Incumbent
- Assumed office 3 December 2023
- Preceded by: Anoop Nag
- Constituency: Antagarh
- In office 2008–2014
- Preceded by: Constituency established
- Succeeded by: Bhojraj Nag
- Constituency: Antagarh
- In office 2003–2008
- Preceded by: Manturam Pawar
- Succeeded by: Kedar Nath Kashyap
- Constituency: Narayanpur

President of Bharatiya Janata Party, Chhattisgarh
- In office 8 March 2019 – 2 June 2020
- Preceded by: Dharamlal Kaushik
- Succeeded by: Vishnudeo Sai

Member of Parliament, Lok Sabha
- In office 2014–2019
- Preceded by: Sohan Potai
- Succeeded by: Mohan Mandavi
- Constituency: Kanker

Minister of Forest Government of Chhattisgarh
- In office 22 December 2008 – 10 December 2013
- Chief Minister: Raman Singh
- Succeeded by: Mahesh Gagda

Minister of Higher & Technical education Government of Chhattisgarh
- In office 2003–2004
- Chief Minister: Raman Singh
- Preceded by: Satyanarayan Sharma
- Succeeded by: Ajay Chandrakar

Member of Madhya Pradesh Legislative Assembly
- In office 1993–1998
- Preceded by: Shambhu Nath Naik
- Succeeded by: Manturam Pawar
- Constituency: Narayanpur

Personal details
- Born: Vikram Usendi; 17 October 1965 (age 60) Kondagaon, Chhattisgarh, India
- Party: Bharatiya Janata Party
- Spouse: Rampyari Usendi (m. 2000)
- Children: 2 sons
- Parents: Dev Singh Usendi (father); Somvati Usendi (mother)
- Occupation: Agriculturist

Vikram Usendi (born 17 October 1965) is an Indian politician and MLA representing the Antagarh Assembly constituency in Chhattisgarh. He was also a former Member of 16th Lok Sabha representing Kanker of Chhattisgarh, State President of Bharatiya Janata Party Chhattisgarh and a Cabinet minister in Government of Chhattisgarh.

== Political career ==
Usendi was first elected to Madhya Pradesh Legislative Assembly in 1993 from Narayanpur and again contested 1998 Assembly election but lost to his Congress rival Manturam Pawar. In 2003 Chhattisgarh Assembly election, he won by huge margin of 8,814 votes. In 2008 election, he won from newly established Antagarh constituency and also retained the seat in 2013. In 2014 general election, he was elected as member of parliament to the 16th Lok Sabha from Kanker (Lok Sabha constituency), Chhattisgarh. In 2023 Chhattisgarh Legislative Assembly election, he again won from Antagarh constituency by huge margin of 59,547 votes.

Party political offices
Preceded by Dharamlal Kaushik	President of the Bharatiya Janata Party Chhattisgarh; 2019–2020	Succeeded by Vishnudeo Sai
Lok Sabha
Preceded by Sohan Potai	Member of Parliament for Kanker; 2014–2019	Succeeded by Mohan Mandavi
