= Aghan Singh Thakur =

Indian politician

Member of Parliament, Lok Sabha
- In office 1977–1980
- Preceded by: Arvind Netam
- Succeeded by: Arvind Netam
- Constituency: Kanker

Personal details
- Born: 26 February 1945
- Party: Janata Party
- Spouse: Ramvati Thakur

Aghan Singh Thakur was an Indian politician. He was elected to the Lok Sabha, lower house of the Parliament of India as a member of the Janata Party.
