= Sangeeta Sinha =

Indian politician (born 1975)

Sangeeta Sinha (born 6 February 1975) is an Indian politician from Chhattisgarh. She is an MLA from Sanjari Balod Assembly Constituency in Balod district. She won the 2023 Chhattisgarh Legislative Assembly election representing Indian National Congress.

== Early life and education ==
Sangeeta is from Sanjari Balod, Balod district, Chhattisgarh. She married Bhaiyaram Sinha. She completed her B.A. in 1977 at Shaskiya College, Dhamtari.

== Career ==
Sangeeta won from Sanjari Balod Assembly constituency representing Indian National Congress in the 2023 Chhattisgarh Legislative Assembly election. She polled 84,649 votes and defeated her nearest rival, Rakesh Kumar Yadav of Bharatiya Janata Paraty, by a margin of 17,046 votes. She became an MLA for the first time winning the 2018 Chhattisgarh Legislative Assembly election succeeding her husband. In 2018, she polled 90,428 votes and defeated her nearest rival, Pawan Sahu of Bharatiya Janata Party, by a margin of 27,488 votes.
