= Pratibha Devi =

Indian politician

Pratibha Devi was an Indian politician from the state of the Madhya Pradesh. He represented Kanker Vidhan Sabha constituency of undivided Madhya Pradesh Legislative Assembly by winning General election of 1957.
