= Kanker Assembly constituency =

Legislative Assembly constituency in Chhattisgarh State, India

Coordinates: 20.69°N 81.46°E

Kanker
- Constituency No. 81 for the Chhattisgarh Legislative Assembly

Constituency details
- Country: India
- Region: Central India
- State: Chhattisgarh
- District: Kanker
- Lok Sabha constituency: Kanker
- Established: 1951
- Total electors: 182,944
- Reservation: ST

Member of Legislative Assembly
- 6th Chhattisgarh Legislative Assembly
- Incumbent Asharam Netam
- Party: Bharatiya Janata Party
- Elected year: 2023
- Preceded by: Shishupal Sori

Kanker is one of the 90 Legislative Assembly constituencies of Chhattisgarh state in India.

It is part of Kanker district and is reserved for candidates belonging to the Scheduled Tribes.

== Members of the Legislative Assembly ==
Year	Member	Party
Madhya Pradesh Legislative Assembly
1952	Ratansingh	Independent
1957	Pratibha Devi	Indian National Congress
1957^	Bisram	Indian National Congress
1962	Bhanuprata Deo	Independent
1967	Vishram Dhongai	Indian National Congress
1972	Vishram Dhongai	Indian National Congress
1977	Harishankar Ramnath	Janata Party
1980	Atmaram Dhruva	Independent
1985	Shyamabhai Dhruva	Indian National Congress
1990	Aghan Singh Thakur	Bharatiya Janata Party
1993	Shiv Netam	Indian National Congress
1998	Shyamabhai Dhruva	Bharatiya Janata Party
Chhattisgarh Legislative Assembly
2003	Aghan Singh Thakur	Bharatiya Janata Party
2008	Sumitra Markole	Bharatiya Janata Party
2013	Shankar Dhruwa	Indian National Congress
2018	Shishupal Shori	Indian National Congress
2023	Asharam Netam	Bharatiya Janata Party

== Election results ==
=== 2023 ===
2023 Chhattisgarh Legislative Assembly election: Kanker
Party	Candidate	Votes	%	±%
BJP	Asha Ram Netam	67,980	45.57	+9.02
INC	Shankar Dhruwa	67,964	45.56	−5.69
GGP	Hemlal Markam	4,236	2.84	−1.77
Independent	Arjun Sing Aachala	1,506	1.01	
Independent	Jayprakash Salam	1,393	0.93	
NOTA	None of the Above	2,729	1.83	−0.64
Majority		16	0.01	−14.69
Turnout		149,190	81.55	+2.44

=== 2018 ===
Chhattisgarh Legislative Assembly Election, 2018: Kanker
Party	Candidate	Votes	%	±%
INC	Shishupal Shori	69,053	51.25	
BJP	Hira Markam	49,249	36.55	
GGP	Hemlal Markam	6,206	4.61	
BSP	Ramsahay Korram	3,014	2.24	
AAP	Bishal Dhruw	2,016	1.50	
Independent	Deepak Kumar Usendi	1,882	1.40	
NOTA	None of the Above	3,323	2.47	
Majority		19,804	14.70	
Turnout		133,717	79.11	

== See also ==
- List of constituencies of the Chhattisgarh Legislative Assembly
- Kanker district
