= Lohara, Durg =

Lohara
- village
- Country: India
- State: Chhattisgarh
- District: Durg
- Tehsil: Dondiluhara

Government
  - Body: Village panchayat

Population (2001)
  - Total: 5,263
- Time zone: UTC+5:30 (IST)
- Vehicle registration: CG

Lohara is a village in Dondiluhara tehsil, Balod district, Chhattisgarh, India.

== Demographics ==
In the 2001 India census, the village of Lohara in Balod district had a population of 5,263, with 2,612 males (49.6%) and 2,651 females (50.4%), for a gender ratio of 1015 females per thousand males.
