= Mohan Mandavi =

Indian politician (born 1957)

Member of Parliament, Lok Sabha
- In office 23 May 2019 – 4 June 2024
- Preceded by: Vikram Dev Usendi
- Succeeded by: Bhojraj Nag
- Constituency: Kanker

Personal details
- Born: 1 May 1957 (age 69) Gotitola, Kanker district, Madhya Pradesh (Presently Chhattisgarh)
- Party: Bharatiya Janata Party
- Spouse: Thalkunwar Mandavi

Mohan Mandavi (born 1 May 1957) is an Indian politician. He was elected to the Lok Sabha, lower house of the Parliament of India from Kanker, Chhattisgarh in the 2019 Indian general election as member of the Bharatiya Janata Party.

Lok Sabha
Preceded by Vikram Usendi	Member of Parliament for Kanker; 2019 – 2024	Succeeded by Bhojraj Nag
