= Balod =

Balod Sanjari Balod
- Town
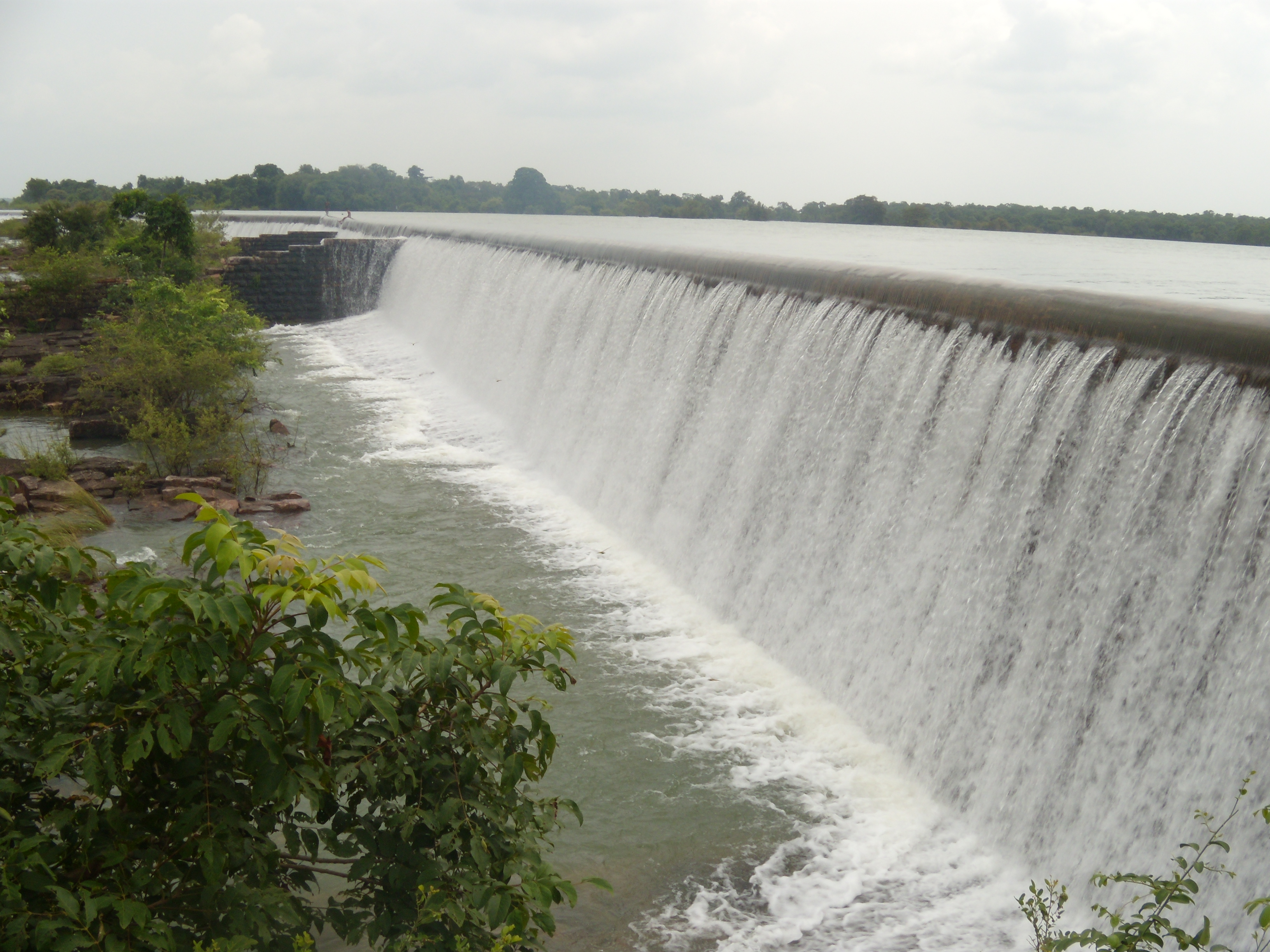
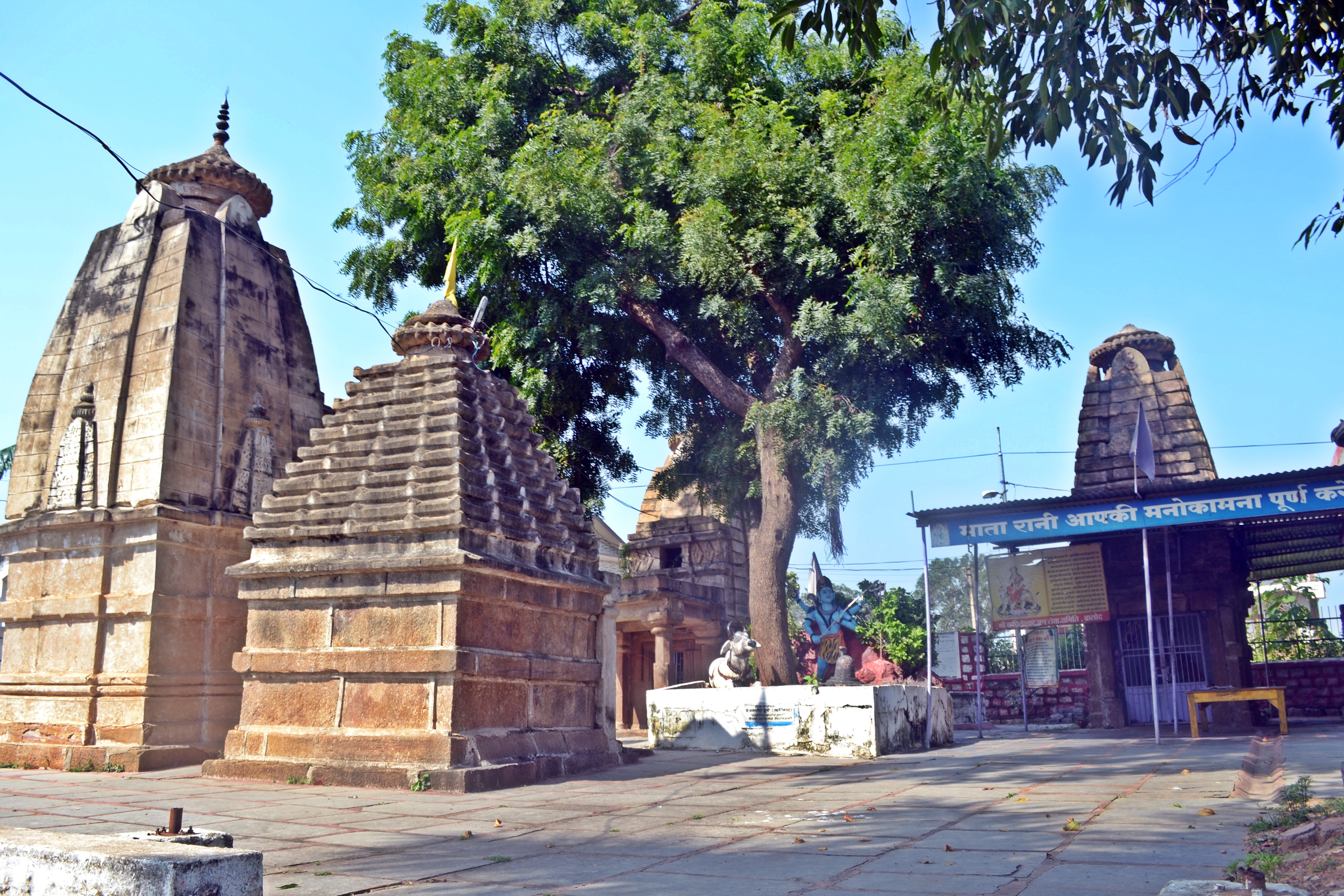
- Tandula Dam, Kapileshwar Temple

- Location within Chhattisgarh Location within India
- Coordinates: 20°43′37.275″N 81°12′14.996″E
- Country: India
- State: Chhattisgarh
- District: Balod
- Elevation: 324 m (1,063 ft)

Population (2011)
  - Total: 32,432

Languages
  - Official: Hindi, Chhattisgarhi
- Time zone: UTC+5:30 (IST)
- PIN: 491226 (Balod)
- Vehicle registration: CG

Balod is a city on the banks of the River Tandula and a nagar palika in Balod district in the state of Chhattisgarh, India. Balod is 44 km from Dhamtari and 58 km from Durg. Balod has one college, one court, one community health centre, and a jail. There are two dams nearby, the Tandula Dam and the Aadmabaad Dam, built on the rivers Sukha and Tandula in 1912. There are several temples in nearby towns, particularly the Ganga Maiyya and Siyadevi temples.

As of August 2018 the district collector of Balod is Saransh Mittar.

== Geography ==
Balod is located at 20.73°N 81.2°E. It has an average elevation of 324 metres (1063 feet).

== Demographics ==
As of 2001 India census, Balod had a population of 21,044. Males constitute 51% of the population and females 49%. Balod has an average literacy rate of 73%, higher than the national average of 59.5%; with 56% of the males and 44% of females literate. 13% of the population is under 6 years of age.
