= Kesholal Gomasta =

Indian politician

Kesholal Gomasta was an Indian politician from the state of the Madhya Pradesh. He represented Balod Vidhan Sabha constituency of undivided Madhya Pradesh Legislative Assembly by winning General election of 1957. He also won in 1962.
