= Rajendra Kumar Rai (Indian politician) =

Indian politician

Rajendra Kumar Rai (born 6 April 1957) is an Indian politician and member of the Bhartiya Janta Party. Rai was a member of the Chhattisgarh Legislative Assembly from the Gunderdehi constituency in Balod district from 2013 to 2018.

On 2 March 2017, the Chhattisgarh Legislative Assembly passed a censure motion against Rai for "unparliamentary" behavior.
