= Sohan Potai =

Indian politician (born 1958)

Member of Parliament, Lok Sabha
- In office 1998–2014
- Preceded by: Chhabila Netam
- Succeeded by: Vikram Usendi
- Constituency: Kanker

Personal details
- Born: Sohan Potai; 29 April 1958 (age 67) Kanker, Chhattisgarh
- Party: Bharatiya Janata Party BJP
- Spouse: Mini Potai
- Children: 1 son and 1 daughter
- As of 25 September, 2006

Sohan Potai (born 29 April 1958) is an Indian politician. He was the member of the 14th Lok Sabha of India. He represents the Kanker constituency of Chhattisgarh and is a member of the Bharatiya Janata Party (BJP) political party.
