= Keshkal =

- city (nagar panchayat)
- Location in Chhattisgarh, India Keshkal (India)
- Coordinates: 20°5′5″N 81°35′12″E
- Country: India
- State: Chhattisgarh
- District: Kondagaon

Population
  - Total: 43,000

Languages
  - Official: Hindi, Halbi
- Time zone: UTC+5:30 (IST)
- PIN: 494331
- Telephone code: 07848
- Vehicle registration: CG 27
- Nearest city: Kanker
- Lok Sabha constituency: Kanker

Keskal is a city in Kondagaon district formerly in Madhya Pradesh and now in Chhattisgarh, India.

== Geography ==
It is located at an elevation of 651 m above MSL.

== Location ==
Keskal is 129 km from Jagdalpur 180 km from Raipur, 30 km from Kanker and about 60 km north of Kondagaon on NH30.

The nearest airport is Raipur Airport, which is 167 km away, and the nearest railway station is at Jagdalpur.

== Tourism ==
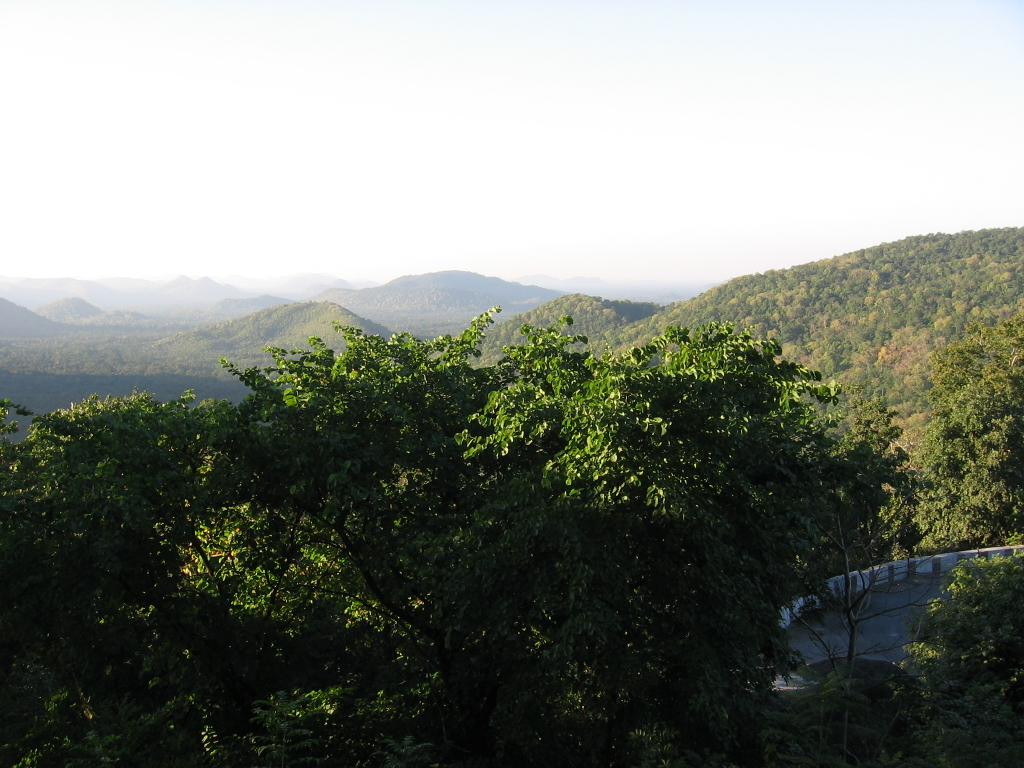
Keskal Ghat

Keshkal Ghat is a nearby attraction. Keshkal Panchavati is a notable tourist spot. It is nearly 2 km (1 mi) from Keshkal bus stand. Gobraien is a pilgrim centre, where a Shiv Linga temple is situated.

== Business and economy ==
The major business done by the peoples of Keshkal are sale and purchase of grains like rice, wheat, maize, mahua, and tamarind. Keskal has heavy bauxite deposits.
