= Antagarh Assembly constituency =

Legislative Assembly constituency in Chhattisgarh State, India

Coordinates: 20.1°N 81.16°E

Antagarh
- Constituency No. 79 for the Chhattisgarh Legislative Assembly

Constituency details
- Country: India
- Region: Central India
- State: Chhattisgarh
- District: Kanker
- Lok Sabha constituency: Kanker
- Established: 2008
- Total electors: 176,261
- Reservation: ST

Member of Legislative Assembly
- 6th Chhattisgarh Legislative Assembly
- Incumbent Vikram Usendi
- Party: Bharatiya Janata Party
- Elected year: 2023

Antagarh is one of the 90 Legislative Assembly constituencies of Chhattisgarh state in India.

It comprises Antagarh tehsil and Pakhanjur tehsil, in Kanker district, and is reserved for candidates belonging to the Scheduled Tribes.

== Members of the Legislative Assembly ==
Year	Member	Party
Until 2008: Constituency did not exist
2008	Vikram Usendi	Bharatiya Janata Party
2013	Vikram Usendi	Bharatiya Janata Party
2014 By-election	Bhojraj Nag	Bharatiya Janata Party
2018	Anoop Nag	Indian National Congress
2023	Vikram Usendi	Bharatiya Janata Party

== Election results ==
=== Assembly Election 2023 ===
2023 Chhattisgarh Legislative Assembly election : Antagarh
Party	Candidate	Votes	%	±%
BJP	Vikram Usendi	59,547	43.52%	▲5.64
INC	Roopsingh Potai 'Moddu'	35,837	26.19%	▼23.33
Independent	Mantu Ram Pawar	15,063	11.01%	New
Independent	Anoop Nag	9,415	6.88%	New
AAP	Santram Salam	7,412	5.42%	▲1.96
NOTA	None of the Above	4,245	3.10%	▼1.09
Independent	Ramesh Mandavi	2,334	1.71%	New
Independent	Ram Narayan Usendi	1,518	1.11%	New
Margin of victory		23,710	17.33%	▲5.69
Turnout		1,36,827	80.07%	▲5.44
Registered electors		1,76,261		▲10.42
BJP gain from INC		Swing	▼6.00	

=== Assembly Election 2018 ===
2018 Chhattisgarh Legislative Assembly election : Antagarh
Party	Candidate	Votes	%	±%
INC	Anoop Nag	57,061	49.52%	New
BJP	Vikram Usendi	43,647	37.88%	▼46.16
Independent	Sukhranjan Usendi Uraf Siledar	4,854	4.21%	New
NOTA	None of the Above	4,831	4.19%	▼13.65
AAP	Santram Salam	3,981	3.45%	New
BSP	Hemant Poyam	1,243	1.08%	New
Margin of victory		13,414	11.64%	▼54.55
Turnout		1,15,230	75.26%	▲22.38
Registered electors		1,59,630		▲5.03
INC gain from BJP		Swing	▼34.52	

=== Assembly By-election 2014 ===
2014 Chhattisgarh Legislative Assembly by-election : Antagarh
Party	Candidate	Votes	%	±%
BJP	Bhojraj Nag	63,616	84.03%	▲34.81
NOTA	None of the Above	13,506	17.84%	New
API	Rupdhar Pudo	12,086	15.97%	New
Margin of victory		50,110	66.19%	▲61.43
Turnout		75,702	58.70%	▼24.27
Registered electors		1,51,983		▲3.63
BJP hold		Swing	▲34.81	

=== Assembly Election 2013 ===
2013 Chhattisgarh Legislative Assembly election : Antagarh
Party	Candidate	Votes	%	±%
BJP	Vikram Usendi	53,477	49.22%	▲3.35
INC	Mantu Ram Pawar	48,306	44.46%	▼1.27
NOTA	None of the Above	4,710	4.34%	New
Chattisgarh Swabhiman Manch	Somnath Uike	2,543	2.34%	New
Shivsena	Jaiprakash Padda	2,308	2.12%	▼1.67
BSP	Raja Ram Komra	2,009	1.85%	▼0.55
Margin of victory		5,171	4.76%	▲4.63
Turnout		1,08,643	77.34%	▲13.55
Registered electors		1,46,653		▲9.30
BJP hold		Swing	▲3.35	

=== Assembly Election 2008 ===
2008 Chhattisgarh Legislative Assembly election : Antagarh
Party	Candidate	Votes	%	±%
BJP	Vikram Usendi	37,255	45.87%	New
INC	Mantu Ram Pawar	37,146	45.74%	New
Shivsena	Om Prakash Padda	3,083	3.80%	New
BSP	Mehatab Singh Rana	1,950	2.40%	New
CPI(M)	Rajiv Dhurwa	1,784	2.20%	New
Margin of victory		109	0.13%	
Turnout		81,218	60.56%	
Registered electors		1,34,173		
BJP win (new seat)				

== See also ==
- List of constituencies of the Chhattisgarh Legislative Assembly
- Kanker district
