= Arvind Netam =

Indian politician

Member of Parliament, Lok Sabha
- In office 1980–1996
- Preceded by: Aghan Singh Thakur
- Succeeded by: Chhabila Netam
- In office 1971–1977
- Preceded by: Trilok Lal Priyendra Shah
- Succeeded by: Aghan Singh Thakur
- Constituency: Kanker

Personal details
- Born: 1942 (age 83–84)
- Party: Indian National Congress
- Profession: Politician

Arvind Netam (born 1942) is an Indian politician. He was Minister of State for Education and Social Welfare from February 1973 to March 1977 in Indira Gandhi Cabinet and Minister of State for Agriculture from January 1993 to 1996 in P. V. Narasimha Rao Cabinet.
