= Ghotul =

Communal hut for children

A gotul is a tribal youth dormitory in form of a spacious hut surrounded by earthen or wooden walls. It is an integral part of Gond and Muria tribal life in regions of Chhattisgarh and the neighboring areas in Madhya Pradesh, Maharashtra and Andhra Pradesh in India. It is a place for youths, an independent and autonomous "children's republic" as described by Verrier Elwin. The gotul is central to social and religious life in Gond society. According to Gond legend, Lingo, the supreme deity, created the first gotul.

== History and function ==
Lingo, the supreme deity and the heroic ancestor of the tribe, was the founder of the first gotul, and is at the centre of the gotul's culture. It has an elder facilitator with young, unmarried boys and girls as its members. Girl members of the gotul are called motiaris, while boy members are called cheliks; their leaders are called the belosa and siredar respectively. The members are taught lessons of cleanliness, discipline, and hard work. They are taught to take pride in their appearance and to respect themselves and their elders. They are also taught the idea of public service.

== Gotul system of marriage ==
The gotul's social sanction makes it one of the most important social institution in Madia society—no major social activity could happen without participation of gotul members. The boys act as acolytes at festivals, the girls as bridesmaids at weddings. This participation continues until death ceremonies in the society. With boys telling stories, asking riddles, reporting daily affairs, planning expeditions and allotment of duties, the gotul is a place embedded in and nurtured by the larger socio-religious landscape of the Gond society—a sacred place where no wrongs can be committed.

The Madia Gond gotuls are different from the Bastar gotuls in that boys and girls return to their homes to sleep.

Verrier Elwin stated: "The message of the gotul—that youth must be served, that freedom and happiness are more to be treasured than any material gain, that friendliness and sympathy, hospitality and unity are of the first importance, and above all that human love—and its physical expression—is beautiful, clean and precious, is typically Indian."
