= Anila Bhediya =

Indian politician

Minister of Woman and Child Welfare and Social Welfare Government of Chhattisgarh
- In office 2018–2023
- Preceded by: Ramsheila Sahu
- Succeeded by: Laxmi Rajwade

Member of Chhattisgarh Legislative Assembly
- Incumbent
- Assumed office 11 December 2018
- Preceded by: Ramsheila Sahu
- Constituency: Daundi Lohara

Personal details
- Born: February 25, 1967 (age 59)
- Party: Indian National Congress
- Occupation: Politician

Anila Bhediya (born 25 February 1967) is an Indian politician and was the Minister of Child and Woman Welfare in government of Chhattisgarh. She is a member of the Chhattisgarh Legislative Assembly representing the Daundi Lohara Vidhan Sabha constituency of Chhattisgarh and Indian National Congress politician.
