= Tandula Dam =

Dam in India

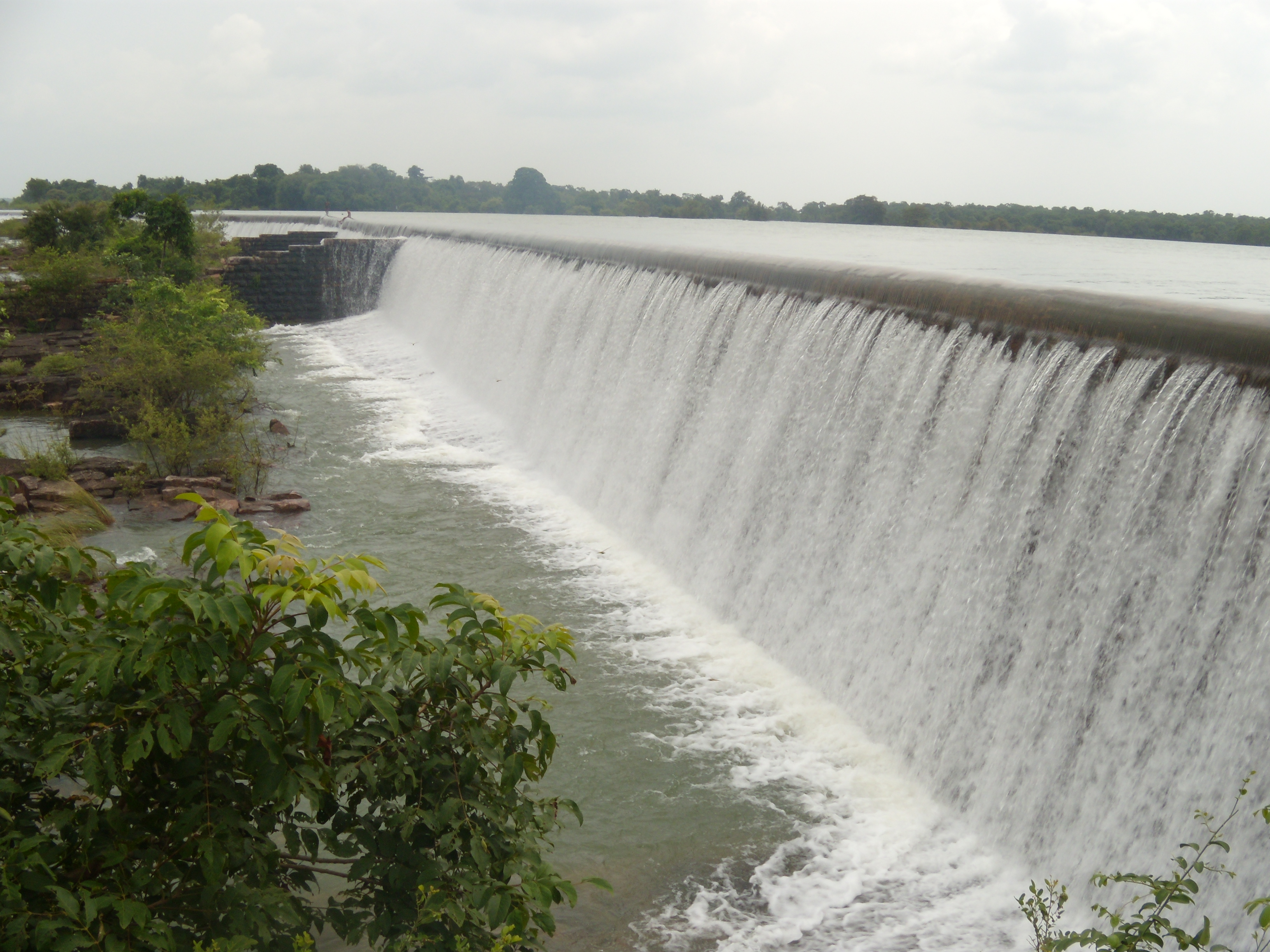
- Interactive map of Tandula Dam
- Country: Balod district, Chhattisgarh, India
- Coordinates: 20°42′10.8″N 81°13′4.8″E
- Status: Operational
- Opening date: 1923

Tandula Dam is located in Chhattisgarh in India. It is located at about 2 km from Balod Collectorate in Balod district. The dam project was started in 1910 on the confluence of Tandula and Sukha Nala rivers and was completed in 1921. The dam stores water from catchment area of 827.2 square kilometres (319.4 sq mi). The gross storage capacity of the reservoir is 302.31 million cubic metres and the highest flood level is 333.415 metres (1,093.88 ft). Its Designed Area is 25397 Hact. The Dam provide Drinking Water to Durg & Bhilai Nagar Nigam area and caters to industrial requirement of Bhilai Steel Plant. Tandula river joins the ShivNath river.

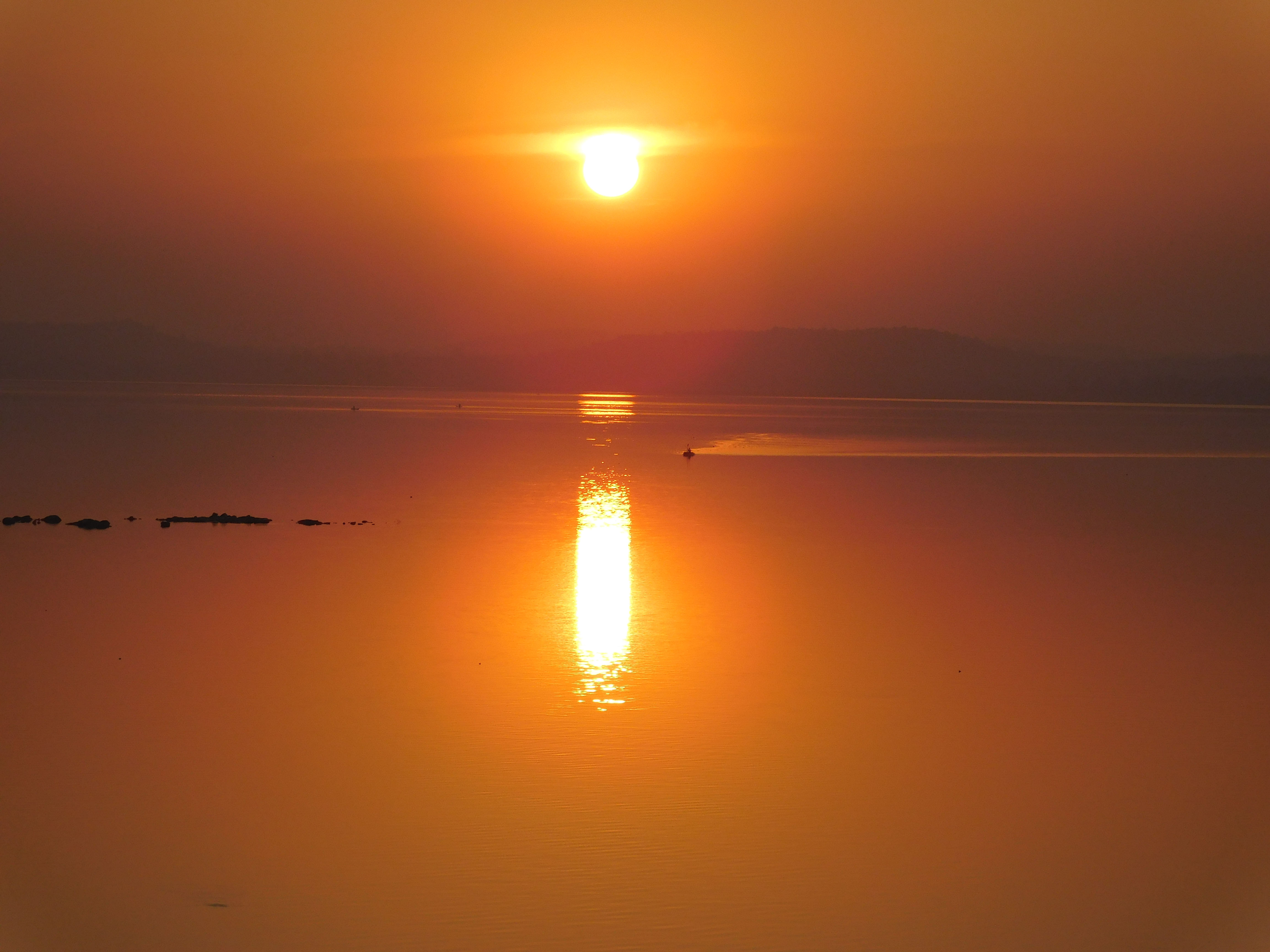
Tandula Dam Sunset
