= Gunderdehi =

Coordinates: 20°57′N 81°17′E

Gunderdehi is a nagar panchayat (municipal transition area) located in the Balod district of Chhattisgarh state of India.

The latitude 20.945649 and longitude 81.291157 are the geo coordinate of the Gunderdehi.

Social Worker Shamshad Begum, Padma Shri Awardee, works in villages around Gunderdehi.
