= Kondagaon =

- City
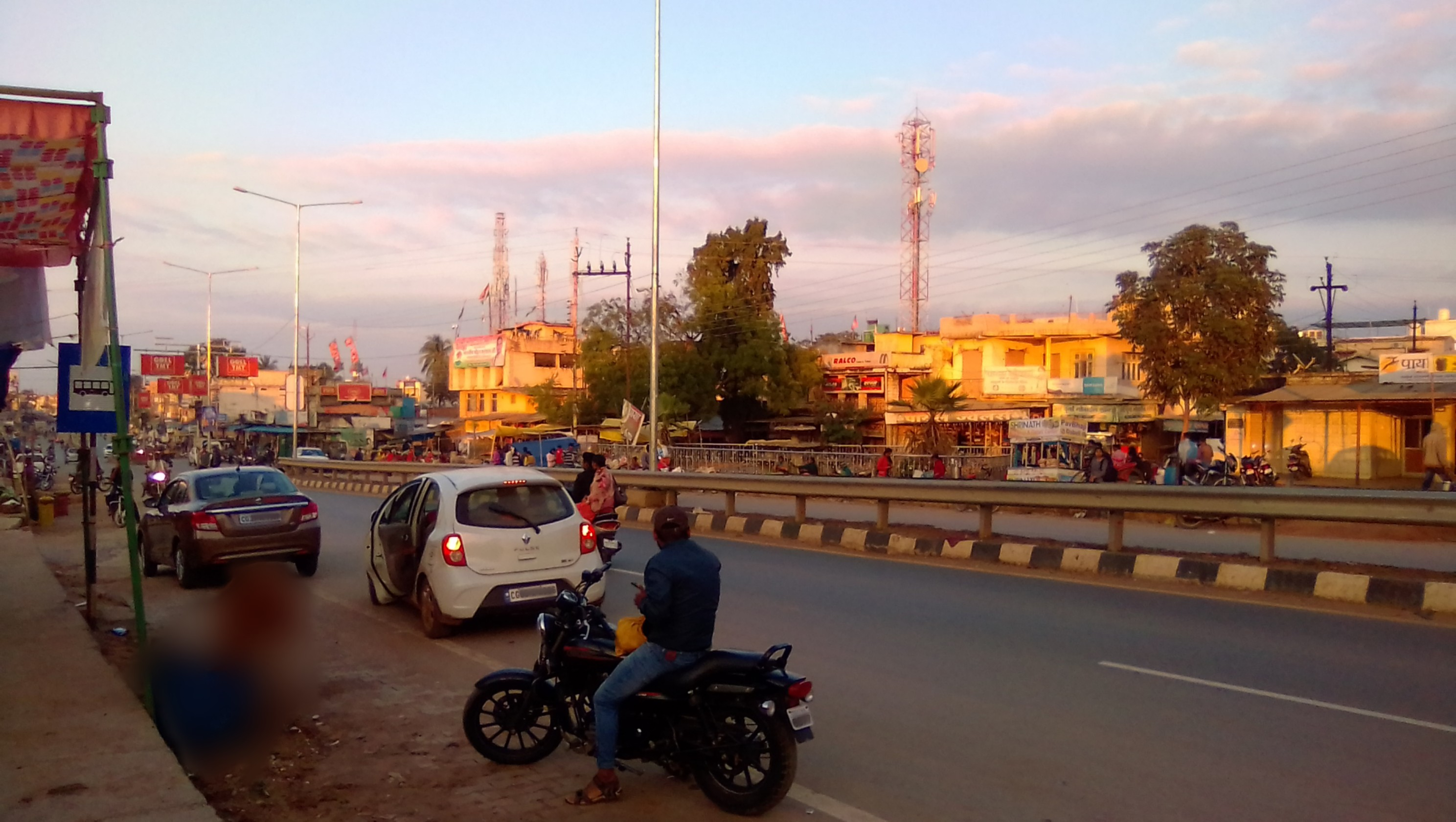
- Kondagaon city in 2019
- Nickname: (1)Craft city (2)Kondanar
- Location within Chhattisgarh Location within India
- Coordinates: 19°35′23.424″N 81°39′44.22″E
- Country: India
- State: Chhattisgarh
- District: Kondagaon

Government
  - Body: municipality
  - Rank: 3rd in Bastar division
- Elevation: 593 m (1,946 ft)

Population (2011)
  - Total: 40,921
- Demonym: Bastariya

Languages
  - Official: Hindi, Halbi
- Time zone: UTC+5:30 (IST)
- PIN: 494226 (Kondagaon)
- Vehicle registration: CG-27
- Website: http://kondagaon.gov.in/

Kondagaon a municipality about 70 kilometers from Jagdalpur city is the headquarter of Kondagaon district in the Indian state of Chhattisgarh. It is the third largest city of Bastar division. Kondagaon separated from Bastar district on 24 January 2012 and formed as 27th district of the Chhattisgarh state. It is mostly renowned for its bell metal craft, which uses a unique blend of tin and copper, and other art forms native to the tribal of Bastar. Also known as the Shilp sheher (lit. craft city) of Chhattisgarh owing to the variety of indigenous crafts produced in the area.

MLA - Ms Lata Usendi (BJP)

Collector - Mr Kunal (IAS) Dudawat

SP - Y Akshay Kumar (IPS)

CEO - Nupur Rashi Panna (IAS)

== Background ==
Kondagaon is located at 19.6°N 81.67°E. It has an average elevation of 593 metres (1945 feet).

As of 2011 India census, Kondagaon had a population of 40,921. Males constitute 50% of the population and females 50%. Kondagaon has an average literacy rate of 64%, higher than the national average of 59.5%: male literacy is 73%, and female literacy is 55%. In Kondagaon, 14% of the population is under 6 years of age.

Kondagaon lies on the NH 30 highway and can be reached from either Raipur or Jagdalpur. Frequent bus services are available to Kondagaon from Raipur and Jagdalpur. The nearest railway station is Jagdalpur. A Helicopter strip was temporarily constructed in the playground adjacent to the government college campus, which is occasionally used in Kondagaon.

The town is known for the foodies, being migrants and settlers from various parts of India including the south and the north. Lala Hotel is the oldest hotel in the city, operating through the post-independence era when Kondagaon was as much of a small city. Kondagaon is situated on banks of the river Narangi.

== Industries ==
=== Art and craft ===
The bell metal craft practiced by most of the craftsmen in the town and the adjacent villages is a form of almost extinct wax sculpting art. Some of the celebrated craftsmen of the bell-metal art forms are the late Dr. Jaidev Baghel (a national awardee), Sushil Sakhuja, Sukchand, and Suresh Baghmare.

The government endow various schemes and policies to promote these art forms and artisans including sponsoring a select few second or third generation artisans for training in the national institute of design, enabling them to keep abreast with the trends and also widening the scope of their art forms.

=== Timber ===
Kondagaon is famous for timber mills, as the division hosts one of the largest forest division in the Indian subcontinent.

== Tourism ==
A couple of hillocks that skirt the eastern outskirts of the town (Kondagaon) have been revamped as a tourist park by the forest department. The park would host relocated common wild animals and fowl of the Bastar region. Most of the hill has been turned into a recreational zone.

The Coconut Development Board located in the southern frills of the town is a central government coconut development farm, sprawling across acres of coconut and assorted plantations.

In the Keshkal block of district Kondagaon there are more a dozen of waterfalls and few caves. Some of the known waterfalls, caves, valleys and archeological sites are:

Satnam Hathi Pahad

Satnam Hathi Pahad is a natural and culturally significant hill located at Keshkal Zero Point in Keshkal, Chhattisgarh, India. The hill is associated with the cultural and religious traditions of the Satnam Panth and holds significance among local communities. The site is situated in the hilly landscape of the Keshkal region and is known for its natural surroundings and association with local Satnam traditions. According to local traditions, the hill has historical and cultural connections with the Satnam movement. Location: Keshkal Zero Point, Keshkal, Chhattisgarh, India Significance: Natural, cultural and religious Associated tradition: Satnam Panth

== Waterfalls ==
- Katulkasa Waterfall, Honhed

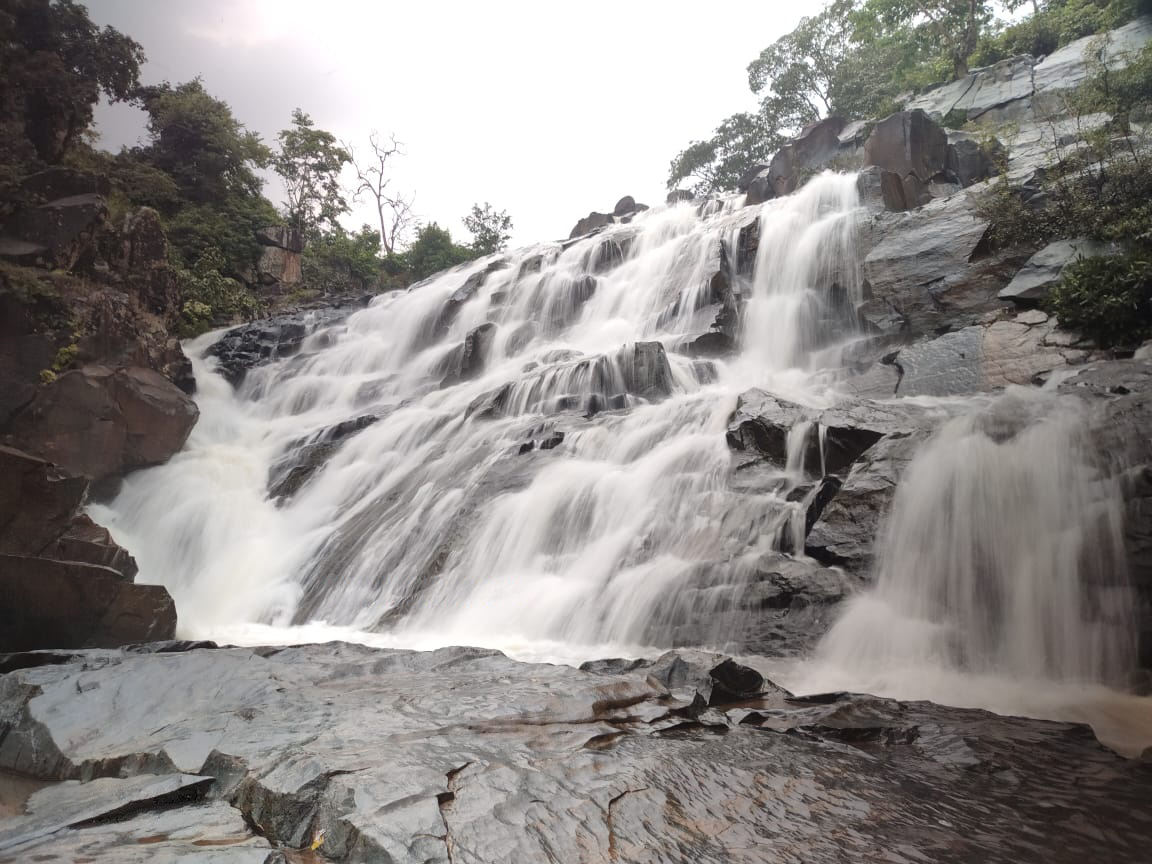
Honhed Waterfall

- Bijkudum Waterfall, Uper-murvend
- Umradah Waterfall
- Ling-Darha Waterfall
- Amadarha-1 Waterfall
- Amadarha-2 Waterfall
- Hankhi-kudum Waterfall

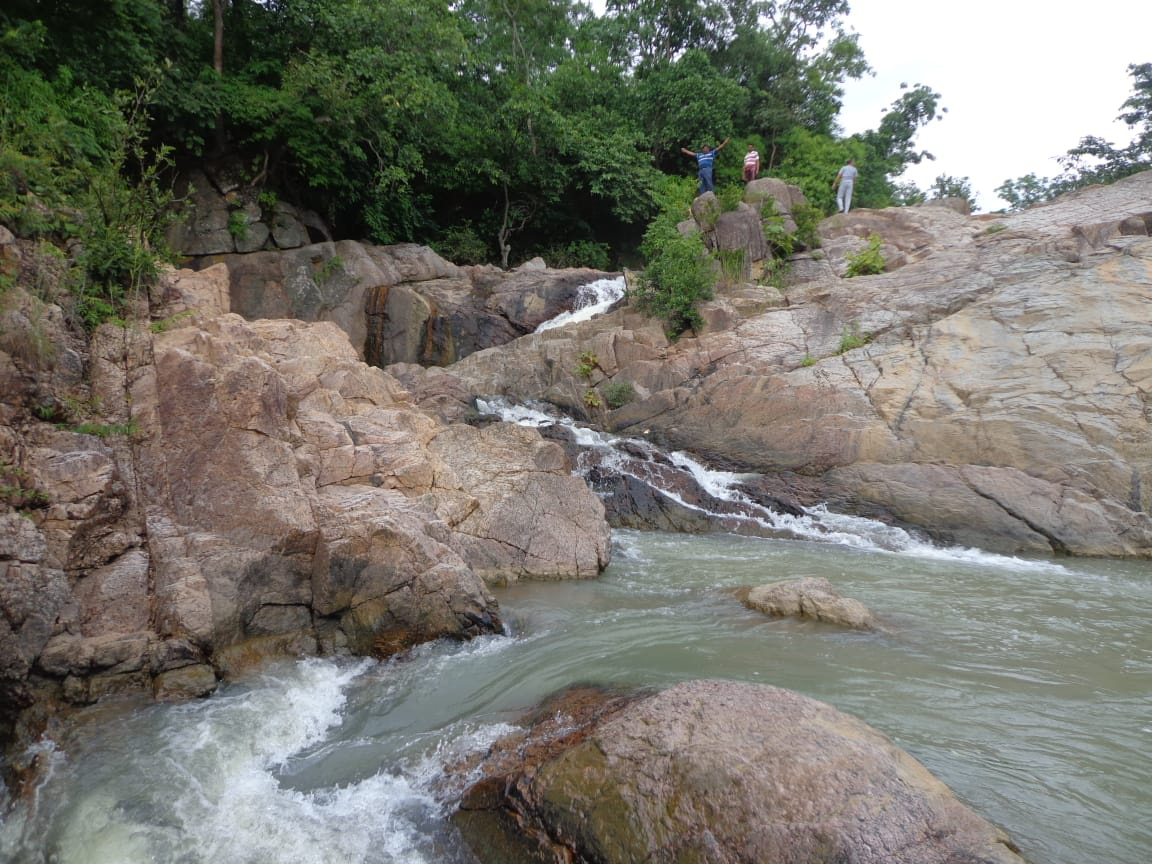
Hankhi Kudum Waterfall

- Ghumur Waterfall
- Kudarwahi Waterfall

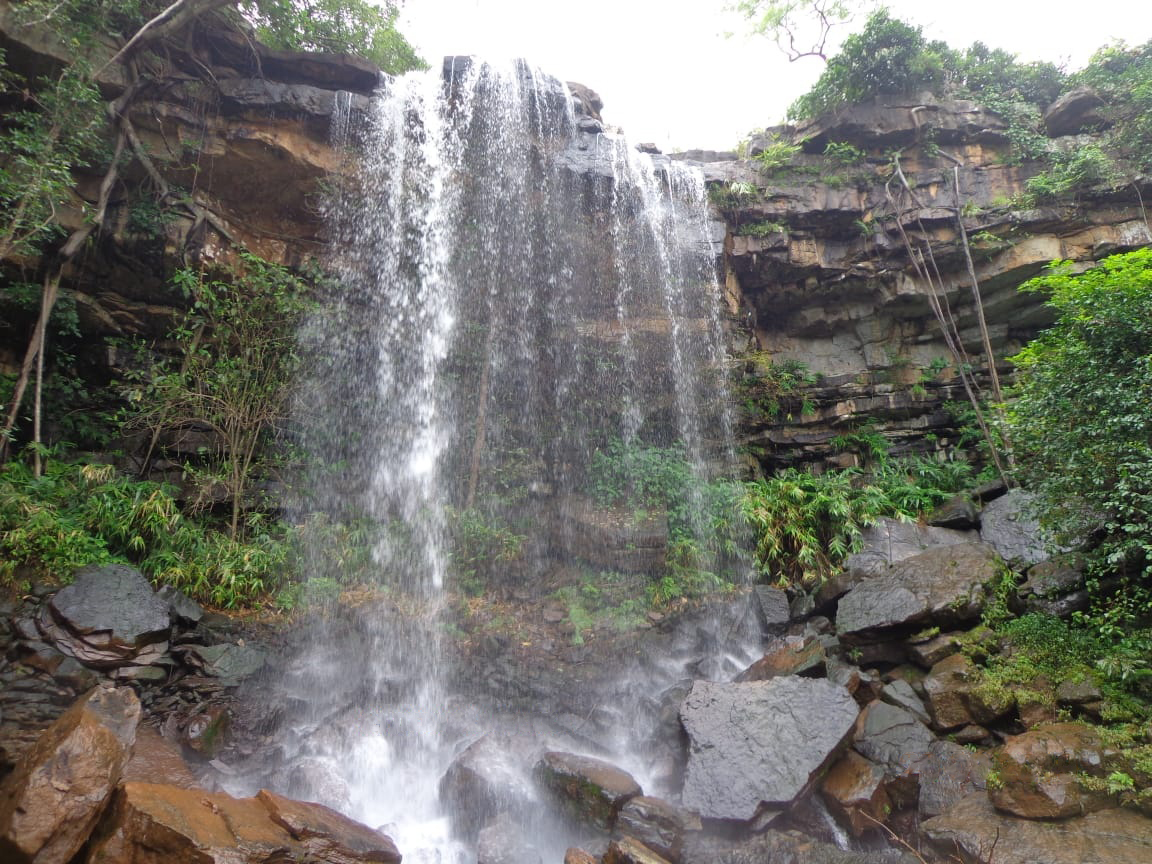
Kudarwahi Waterfall

- Uperbedi Waterfall
- Mirde Waterfall
- Mutte-Khadka Waterfall
- Cherbeda Waterfall

== Caves ==
- Alor cave
- Bijkudum cave
- Katthan-gundi cave
- Satnam hathi pahad

Satnam Hathi pahad

== Valleys ==
- Keshkal Valley

== Archeological sites ==
- Gobrahin
- Garh-dhanora
- Amrawati
- Manjhingarh

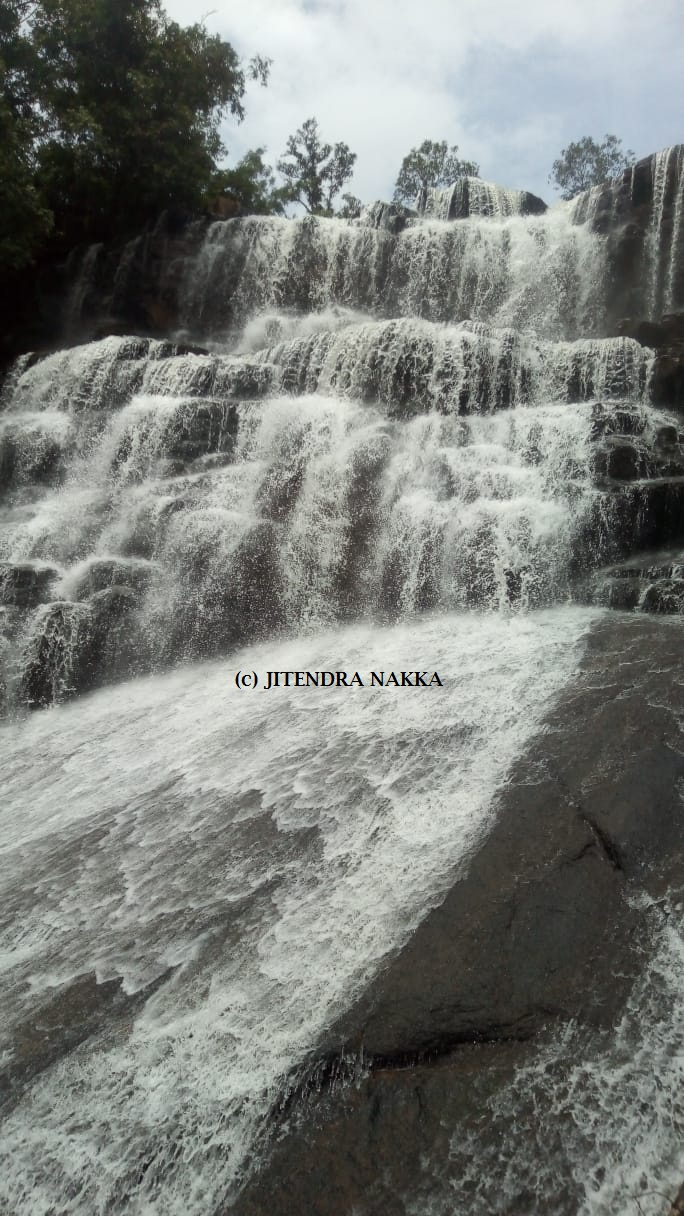
Mirde Waterfall

=== Megalithic sites ===
Rock paintings have been found at the following:

- Umrada
- Hata Pathra
- Lingo-Dhara Waterfall
