= Bastar district =

- District
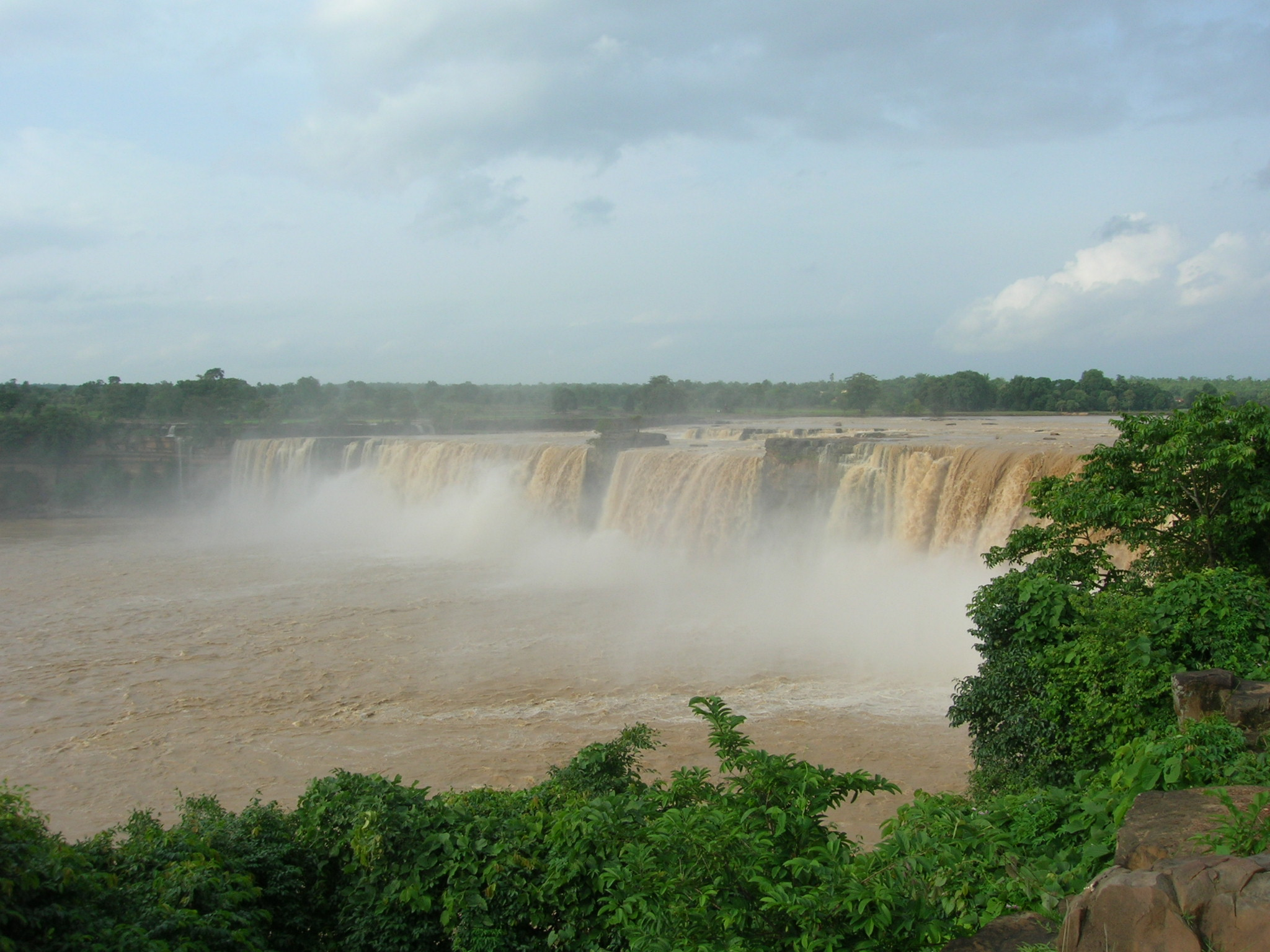
- Chitrakot falls, Bastar
- Interactive map of Bastar district
- Country: India
- State: Chhattisgarh
- Created: 1948
- Headquarters: Jagdalpur

Government
  - Collector & District Magistrate: Shri Rajat Bansal, IAS
  - Divisional Forest Officer Cum Wildlife Warden: Sri Staylo Mandavi, IFS
  - Superintendent of Police: Sri Deepak Jha, IPS

Area
  - Total: 6,597 km^{2} (2,547 sq mi)

Population (2011 census)
  - Total: 834,375
  - Density: 127/km^{2} (330/sq mi)
- Time zone: UTC+5:30 (IST)
- PIN: 494xxx (Bastar)
- Website: bastar.gov.in/en/

Bastar district is a district in the state of Chhattisgarh in Central India. Jagdalpur is the district headquarters. Bastar is bounded on the northwest by Narayanpur District, on the north by Kondagaon district, on the east by Nabarangpur and Koraput Districts of Odisha State, on the south and southwest by Dantewada and Sukma. The district possesses a unique blend of tribal and Odia culture.

Bastar and Dantewada districts were formerly part of the princely state of Bastar. Bastar was founded in the early 14th century, by Annama Deva, the brother of Kakatiya King Pratapa Rudra Deva of Warangal in Telangana. After India achieved independence in 1947, the princely states of Bastar and Kanker acceded to the Government of India, and were merged to form Bastar district of Madhya Pradesh. The district, which had an area of 39,114 km^{2} (15,102 sq mi), was one of the largest in India when formed.

In 1999, the district was divided into the present-day districts of Bastar, Dantewada, and Kanker. In 2000, Bastar was one of the 16 Madhya Pradesh districts that formed a part of the new state of Chhattisgarh. In 2012, it was divided again to form Kondgaon district. These four districts are part of Bastar Division.

Bastar is known for its traditional Dussehra festival. The Chitrakoot and Teerathgarh waterfalls are situated close to Jagdalpur.

The district is a part of the Red Corridor. Gondi and Halbi are the two main languages, while Chhattisgarhi and Hindi are also spoken. It has been a tourist attraction for decades for its rich diversity of flora and fauna.

== Administration ==
There are 12 taluks in the Bastar district according to the Census of India, 2011. The district has one municipality, Jagdalpur Nagar Nigam. Jagdalpur, the administrative headquarters, is a city with a population of about 3,50,000. Transport railway stations- 11; RTc deposits – 03; Airports- Jagdalpur.

Bastar is a tribal-majority district governed under the Fifth Schedule of the Indian Constitution and the Provisions of the Panchayats (Extension to Scheduled Areas) Act, 1996 (PESA). Under this framework, the Gram Sabha plays an important role in decision-making regarding community resources, customary dispute resolution, and local development plans. Also all seats of Chairpersons of Panchayats at all levels are reserved for the Scheduled Tribes.

== Demographics ==
Religions in Bastar district (2011)
Religion	Percent
Hinduism	94.92%
Christianity	3.19%
Islam	0.97%
Other or not stated	0.92%

According to the 2011 census, Bastar District had a population of 1,413,199 before its split into Kondagaon and Bastar, after the split having a population of 834,375. This gives it a ranking of 348th in India (out of a total of 640). The district has a population density of 140 inhabitants per square kilometre (360/sq mi). Its population growth rate over the decade 2001-2011 was 17.83%. Bastar has a sex ratio of 1024 females for every 1000 males, and a literacy rate of 54.94%.

After the splitting of Kondagaon district, the district's population is 834,375 of which 135,511 (16.24%) live in urban areas. Bastar has a sex ratio of 1017 females per 1000 males and a literacy rate of 53.15%. Scheduled Castes and Scheduled Tribes make up 14,759 (1.77%) and 520,779 (62.42%) of the population respectively.

In 1981, Bastar had a population of 1,842,854 with 1,249,197 of the residents being members of scheduled tribes. This represented about 68% of the population. However, these figures are for the pre-1999 Bastar District, which had the same boundaries as the modern Bastar Division. In 2011, still approximately two thirds of those in the division were tribals.

=== Languages ===
Languages of Bastar district (2011)
1. Halbi (38.4%)
2. Bhatri (25.9%)
3. Gondi (14.6%)
4. Hindi (10.8%)
5. Duruwa (2.99%)
6. Chhattisgarhi (2.63%)
7. Odia (1.14%)
8. Others (3.63%)

At the time of the 2011 Census of India, 38.42% of the population in the district spoke Halbi, 25.88% Bhatri, 14.56% Gondi, 10.75% Hindi, 2.99% Duruwa, 2.63% Chhattisgarhi and 1.14% Odia as their first language. There is also a large number of Bengali speakers.

== Economy ==
=== Agriculture ===
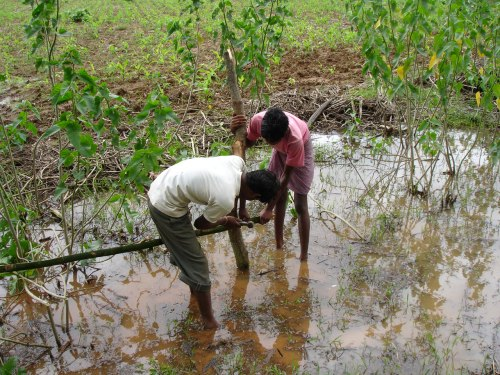
Farmers preparing a fence

Rice is grown predominantly during kharif season as the rain fed crop across a 2.38.9 million hectare area. However, the productivity of this crop is low, with only 08.53 qt/ha. The irrigated area (1.67%) and fertilizer use (4.6 kg/ha.) in the Bastar district is less than in other places of Chhattisgarh, and is insufficient to supply nutrients to the crop.

The pattern of livelihood in Bastar continues to be dictated by tradition. Even today, agricultural practices are traditional. Use of wooden ploughs is common while the number of iron ploughs is negligible. The same is true of bullock carts. The number of tractors is negligible while the bullock carts are all pervasive.

The usage of traditional agricultural implements has lowered the production of agriculture. The kharif crops grown here are paddy, urad, arhar, jowar and maize. The rabi crops include til, alsi, moong, mustard and gram. Forest-related work, including collection and sale of forest produce, supplements the meagre agricultural income of the population.

Most people do not find employment all year round. The cycle of floods and droughts makes livelihoods extremely vulnerable. People are often forced to seek help from moneylenders in times of crisis, which usually means a life of continued indebtedness. The absence of alternate employment opportunities leads to rampant poverty in the area. In the Bastar plateau, irrigation coverage is only 1.2 percent.

Exceptionally fortunate in its water resources, the region has good rainfall and rapid runoff due to the undulating terrain. There is potential for rainwater harvesting in the district.

=== Forest produce ===
Forests play an important role in the lives of the people, providing food and livelihood by way of minor forest produce and employment as casual labour in the Forest department. They provide for consumer needs such fuel, firewood, medicines, food, beverages, and housing materials, among others.

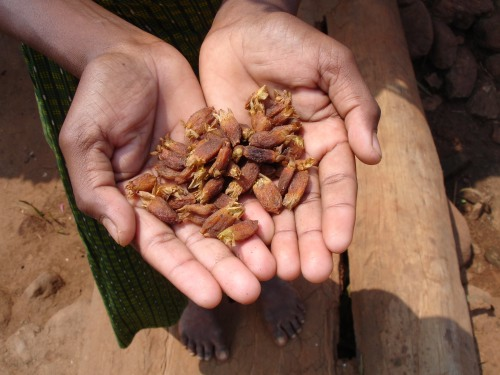
Mahua

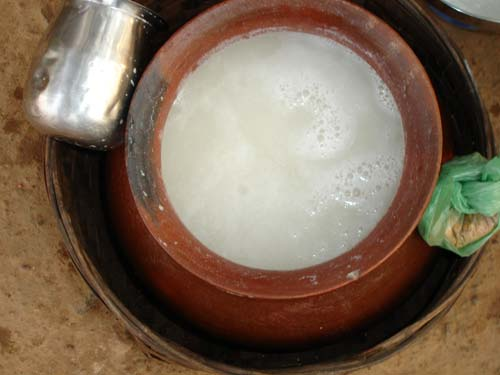
Bastar Beer prepared from Salfi

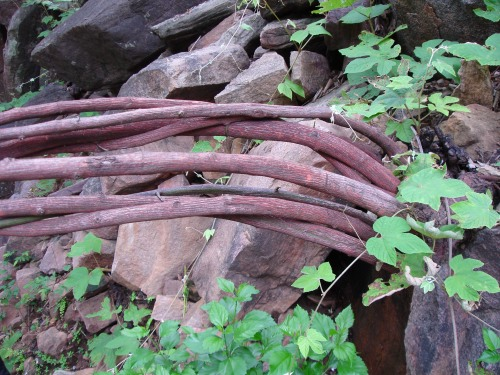
Ventilago, a medicinal plant of Bastar

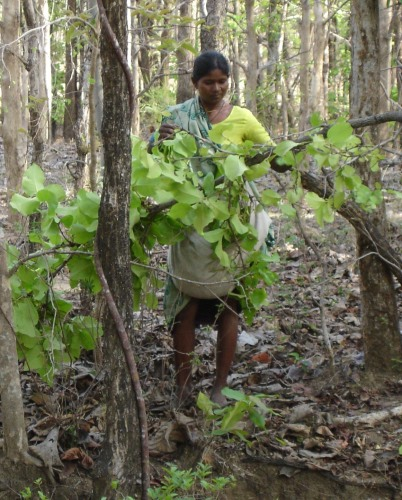
Tendu Patta (Leaf) Collection

=== Industry ===
==== Nagarnar Steel Plant ====
National Mineral Development Corporation (NMDC) is setting up a 3 MTPA capacity greenfield Integrated Steel Plant in Nagarnar, located 16 km from Jagdalpur, with an estimated outlay of Rs 210 billion. The land for the plant has already been acquired as of August 2010 and, as of February 2012, five major packages of the steel plant have already been awarded to internationally acclaimed companies at a cost of around Rs. 65 lakh crore.

==== Tata Steel Plant ====
Tata Steel had inked the deal with the Chhattisgarh Government in June 2008 to set up a green field integrated steel plant at Lohandiguda, about 20 km from Jagdalpur. The proposed 5.5-million-tonne per annum plant has an estimated outlay of Rs 195 billion.

An environment ministry panel has recommended the diversion of forest land for the steel plant in a decision that was taken in the meeting of a Forest Advisory Committee (FAC) of the Ministry of Environment and Forests (MoEF), Government of India.

== Livelihood ==
Forty percent of livelihoods are forest-based, 30 percent are agriculture based and 15 percent of livelihoods are dependent on animal husbandry. Another 15 percent of the income comes from wage labour.

=== Agriculturists ===
People of Bastar with land depend almost entirely on cultivation, either on their own holdings or on the holdings of others. They supplement their income with animal husbandry, and sundry labour at times. Some of them have also diversified into small services or small manufacturing activities.

=== Labourers ===
People without their own land or with very little land survive by working as farm and casual labour. They also work in the non-farm sector, in mines, small shops, on construction sites and as part of the urban work force.

=== Agriculturists and forest gatherers ===
Those with some land, and living in the vicinity of forests, typically become agriculturists and forest gatherers. A major part of the household consumption and income is based on forest gathering, with agricultural activities providing supplementary income.

=== Forest gatherers and labourers ===
People living close to the forests but who have no land or very little land become forest gatherers and/or labourers. They are heavily dependent on forest produce, which they gather and sell or directly consume. At times, this leads to conflicts with the forest administration, due to differences between the customary and official use patterns of the forest. Occasional labour on fields or in the forest supplements their income. Migrant labour is also prevalent among the tribal population of Bastar, especially among the Bison Horn Maria.

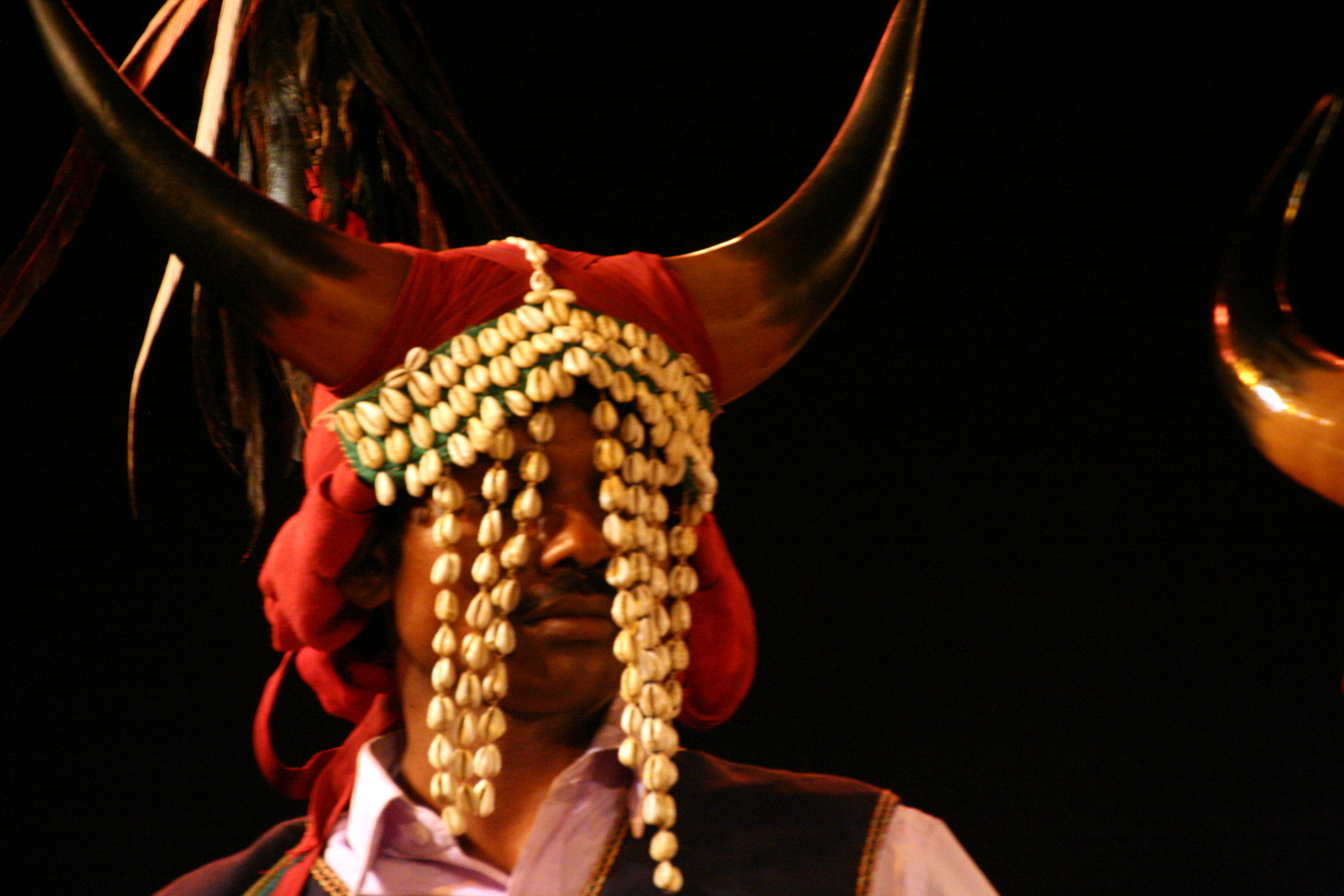
Bison Horn Maria Tribal

== Culture ==
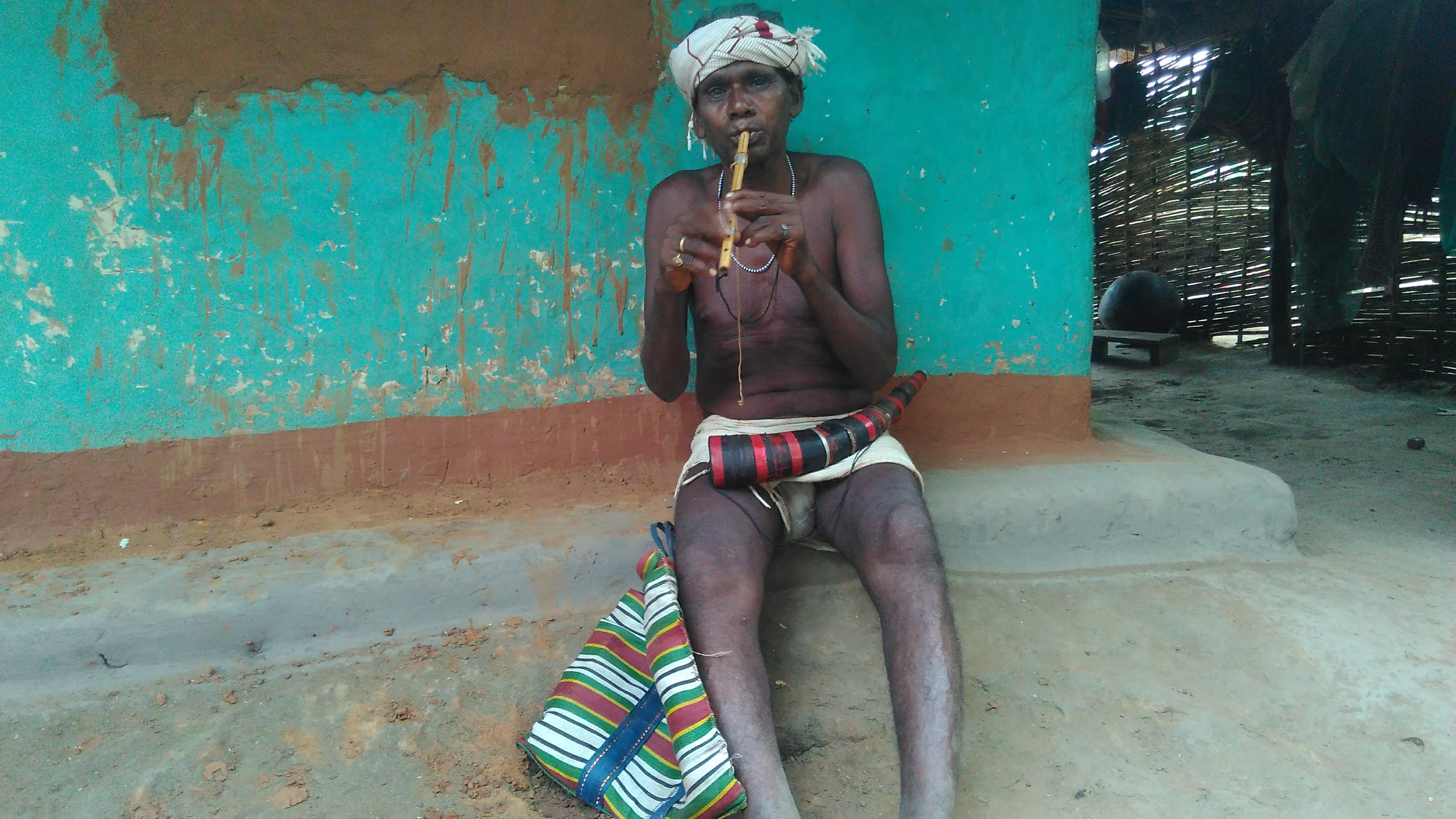
Duruwa man playing a flute

Bastar is well known for its tribal population, which comprises around 63% of the total. The major tribes of the Bastar region are the Gond, bhanj, Abhuj Maria, Bhatra. The Bhatra tribe is believed to have originated through the King of Bastar. Bhatra are divided into subcastes San Bhatra, Pit Bhatra and Amneet Bhatra. Amneet Bhatra hold Highest Status, Halba, Dhurvaa, Muria, and Bison Horn Maria. The Maria are known for their unique Ghotul system. Gonds are also the largest tribal group of central India in terms of population.

The tribes of Bastar region are known for their unique and distinctive tribal culture and heritage. Each tribal group in Bastar has their own distinct culture and enjoys their own unique traditional living styles. Each tribe has developed its own dialects and differs from other tribes in their costumes, eating habits, customs, and traditions. They may even worship different gods and goddesses.

A large number of Bastar tribals still live in deep forests and avoid mingling with outsiders in order to protect their own unique culture. The tribes of Bastar are also known for their colorful festivals and arts and crafts. The main festival of the area is the Bastar Dusshera. The tribals of Bastar were among the earliest to work with metal and have expertise in making figurines of tribal gods, votive animals, oil lamps, and animal carts.

=== Arts and crafts ===
An area where handicraft is most widely practiced in Bastar is Kondagaon. Vessels, jewellery, images of the local deities, and some decorative works of art are made through a process called the lost wax technique, which is notable for its simplicity, is particularly well-suited to tribal settings.

The Bastar district specializes in the preparation of items from Dhokra and unique woodcraft styles. The artifacts prepared from Dhokra technique of this art use beeswax, cow dung, paddy husk and red soil in the preparation. In addition to being used for contouring, wax wires are also used to touch up artifacts for a more polished finish.

The Dhokra and Bell Metal Handicraft are exported all over the world, and some of the handicraft items are purchased by tourists as souvenirs.

== Politics ==
Bastar is part of Bastar Lok Sabha constituency, whose MP is Mahesh Kashyap from the Bharatiya Janata Party. Bastar has three assembly constituencies: Bastar, Jagdalpur and Chitrakot. Bastar and Chitrakot are reserved for Scheduled Tribes. The MLAs for these constituencies are Lakheshwar Baghel (Indian National Congress) and Kiran Singh Deo and Vinayak Gotay (Bharatiya Janata Party) respectively.
