= Kondagaon district =

- District of Chhattisgarh
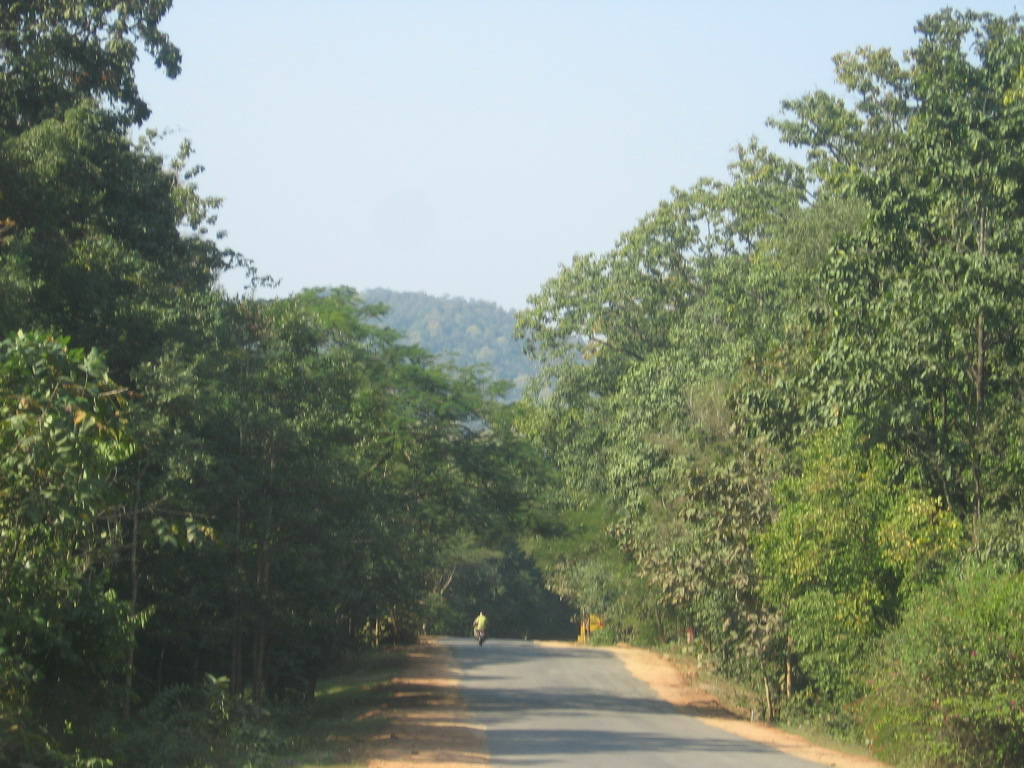
- NH-43 near Keskal
- Interactive map of Kondagaon district
- Coordinates (Kondagaon): 19.59°N 81.65°E
- Country: India
- State: Chhattisgarh
- Division: Bastar
- Established: 24 January 2012
- Headquarters: Kondagaon

Area
  - Total: 7,768 km^{2} (2,999 sq mi)

Population
  - Total: 578,326
  - Density: 74.45/km^{2} (192.8/sq mi)
- Time zone: UTC+05:30 (IST)
- Website: https://kondagaon.gov.in/

Kondagaon district is a district of Chhattisgarh, India, and was separated from Bastar district on 24 January 2012. with its headquarters at Kondagaon. It is mostly renowned for its bell metal craft and other art forms native to the tribal communities of Bastar. It is also known as the Shilp Sheher (lit. craft city) of Chhattisgarh owing to the variety of indigenous crafts produced in the area.

The common name for Kondagaon is Kondanar, which means 'village of horses' in Gondi. On 15 August 2011, Chief Minister Raman Singh declared Kondagaon a separate district.

== History ==
Kondagaon developed along the old road between Narayanpur and Jagdalpur. The construction of the Keshkal Valley road in 1905 led to the growth of new settlements along the route. During the princely period, Kondagaon was part of Bastar State and was under Badadongar tehsil. Kondagaon became the headquarters of a tehsil in 1943.

== Demographics ==
Religions in Kondagaon district (2011)
Religion	Percent
Hinduism	83.96%
Other (Tribal religion)	14.58%
Islam	0.74%
Other or not stated	0.72%

According to the 2011 census, the population was 578,824, of which 57,983 (10.02%) live in urban areas. Kondagaon has a sex ratio of 1033 females per 1000 males and a literacy rate of 57.31%. Scheduled Castes and Scheduled Tribes make up 23,204 (4.01%) and 411,001 (71.01%) of the population respectively.

Languages of Kondagaon district (2011 census)
1. Halbi (42.4%)
2. Gondi (28.0%)
3. Chhattisgarhi (22.2%)
4. Hindi (3.40%)
5. Bhatri (1.39%)
6. Others (2.56%)

At the time of the 2011 census, 42.41% of the population spoke Halbi, 28.04% Gondi, 22.20% Chhattisgarhi, 3.40% Hindi and 1.39% Bhatri as their first language.

== Administrative Division ==
There are 5 tehsils in Kondagaon District -

1. Kondagaon
2. Keshkal
3. Baderajpur
4. Pharasgaon
5. Makdi
