= Balod district =

- District
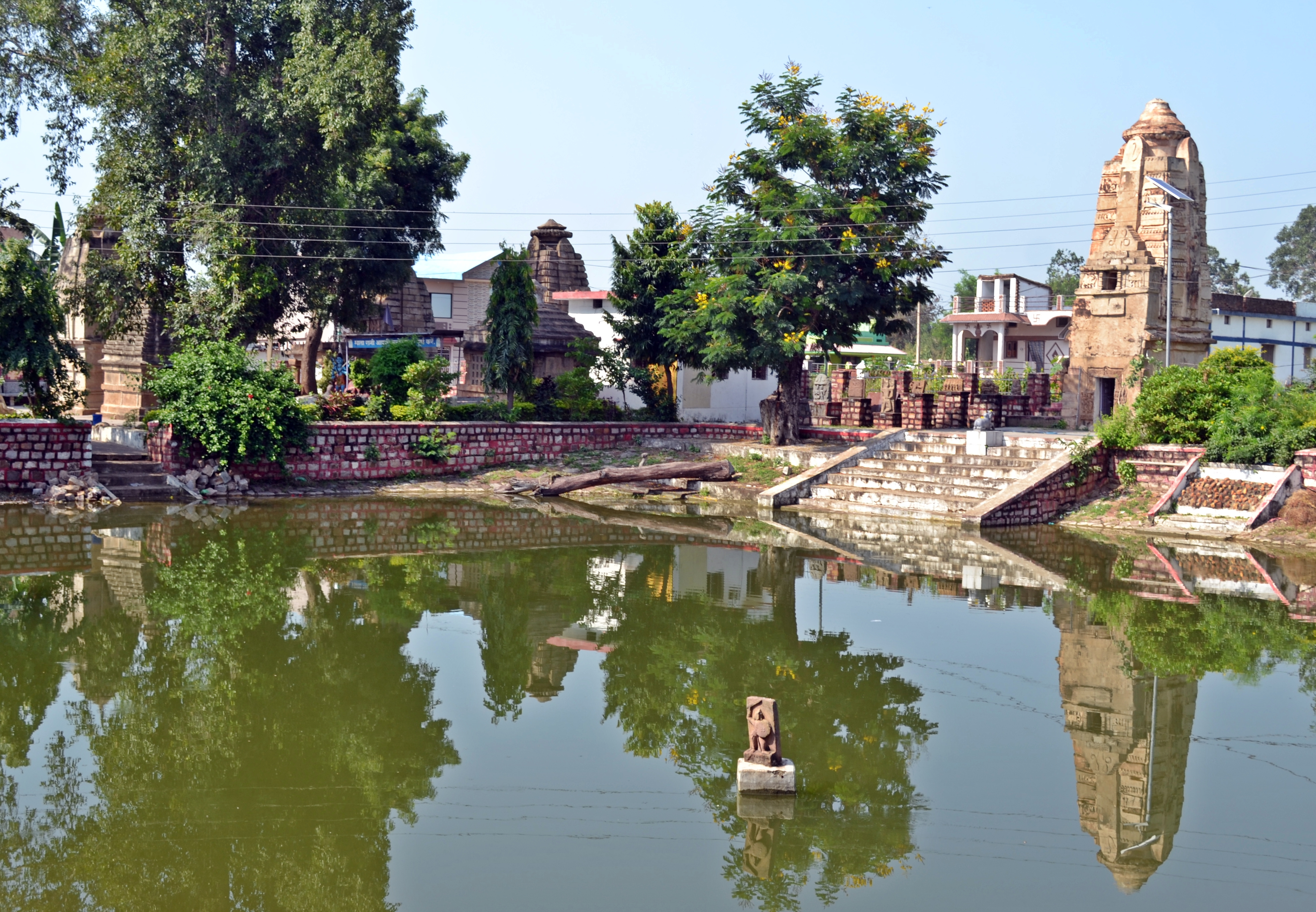
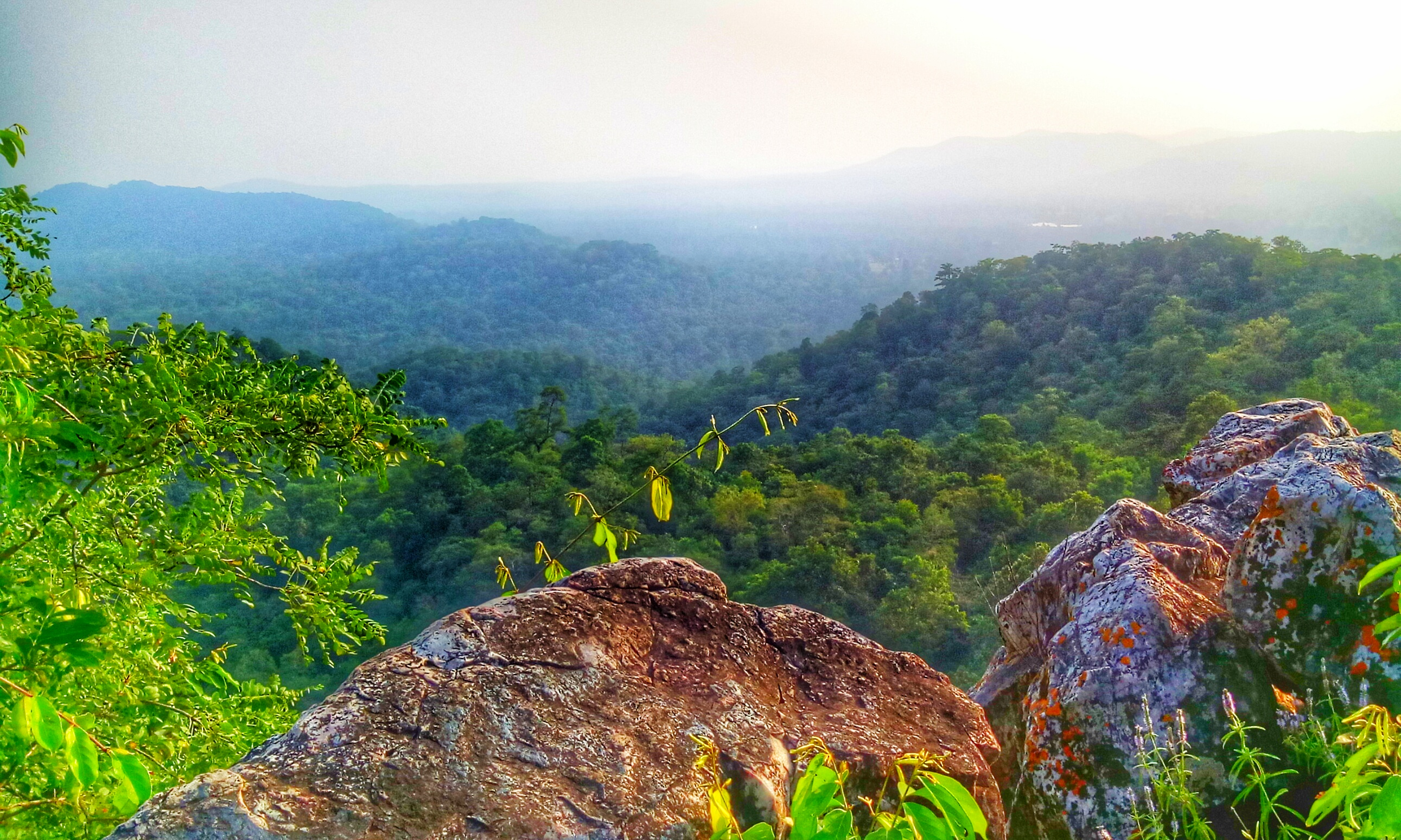
- Kapileswar Shiva Temple, Rajhara Forest and Mountains
- Interactive map of Balod district
- Country: India
- State: Chhattisgarh
- Division: Durg
- Headquarters: Balod

Area
  - Total: 3,527 km^{2} (1,362 sq mi)

Population (2011)
  - Total: 826,165
  - Density: 234.2/km^{2} (606.7/sq mi)

Demographics
  - Sex ratio: 1022
- Time zone: UTC+05:30 (IST)
- Website: balod.gov.in

Balod district is a district within the state of Chhattisgarh. Its headquarters are in Balod.

It has a District & Sessions Court which was inaugurated on 2 October 2013 by Justice Sunil Kumar Sinha. Deepak Kumar Tiwari joined as the first District & Sessions Judge at Balod.

== Administration ==
In Balod, the First Collector is Amrit Khalko, and the First A.S.P. is D.L. Manhar.

== Divisions ==
There's 7 tehsil's in District.

1. Balod

2. Dundi

3. Mary Bungalow Deori

4. Dundi Lohara

5. Arjunda

6. Gunderdehi

7. Gurur

== Demographics ==
Religions in Balod district (2011)
Religion	Percent
Hinduism	93.11%
Other (tribal religion)	4.63%
Islam	0.88%
Jainism	0.47%
Buddhism	0.45%
Other or not stated	0.46%
Distribution of religions

The population of the district as per 2011 census is 826,165, of which 105,498 (12.77%) live in urban areas. Balod has a sex ratio of 1021 females per 1000 males. Scheduled Castes and Scheduled Tribes make up 8.28% and 31.36% of the population respectively.

Languages of Balod district (2011)
1. Chhattisgarhi (93.1%)
2. Hindi (4.88%)
3. Others (2.05%)

As of the 2011 census, 93.07% of the population spoke Chhattisgarhi and 4.88% Hindi as their first language.
