= List of by-elections to the Chhattisgarh Legislative Assembly =

The following is a list of by-elections held for the Chhattisgarh Legislative Assembly, India, since its formation in 2000.

== 2008 - 2013 ==
Date	S.No	Constituency	MLA before election	Party before election	Elected MLA	Party after election
14 February 2011	59	Sanjari Balod	Madanlal Sahu	Bharatiya Janata Party	Kumari Bai Sahu	Bharatiya Janata Party

== 2013 - 2018 ==
Date	S.No	Constituency	MLA before election	Party before election	Elected MLA	Party after election
13 September 2014	79	Antagarh	Vikram Usendi	Bharatiya Janata Party	Bhojraj Nag	Bharatiya Janata Party

== 2018 - 2024 ==
Date	S.No	Constituency	MLA before election	Party before election	Elected MLA	Party after election
23 September 2019	88	Dantewada	Bhima Mandavi	Bharatiya Janata Party	Devati Karma	Indian National Congress
21 October 2019	87	Chitrakot	Deepak Baij	Indian National Congress	Rajman Venjam	Indian National Congress
3 November 2020	24	Marwahi	Ajit Jogi	Janta Congress Chhattisgarh	Krishna Kumar Dhruw	Indian National Congress
12 April 2022	73	Khairagarh	Devwrat Singh	Janta Congress Chhattisgarh	Yashoda Verma	Indian National Congress
5 December 2022	80	Bhanupratappur	Manoj Singh Mandavi	Indian National Congress	Savitri Manoj Mandavi	Indian National Congress

== 2024 - 2029 ==
Date	S.No	Constituency	MLA before election	Party before election	Elected MLA	Party after election	Reason
13 November 2024	51	Raipur City South	Brijmohan Agrawal	Bharatiya Janata Party	Sunil Kumar Soni	Bharatiya Janata Party	Elected to Lok Sabha on June 4, 2024

== See also ==
- Elections in Chhattisgarh
- List of Indian state legislative assembly elections
