= Political families of Chhattisgarh =

List of Indian political families based in Chhattisgarh

This is a partial listing of prominent political families of Chhattisgarh.

Jogi family

- Ajit Jogi, first Chief Minister of Chhattisgarh
  - Amit Jogi, son of former Chief Minister Ajit Jogi

Shukla family

- Ravi Shankar Shukla, Chief Minister of Madhya Pradesh
  - Shyama Charan Shukla, Chief Minister of Madhya Pradesh
    - Amitesh Shukla, son of Shyama Charan Rural Development Minister in the Chhattisgarh 2002/03
  - Vidya Charan Shukla, Minister of External Affairs

Kashyap family

- Baliram Kashyap, member of Lok Sabha from Bastar
  - Dinesh Kashyap, Member of Lok Sabha from Bastar

Singh family

- Raman Singh, Ex Chief Minister of Chhattisgarh
  - Abhishek Singh, Member of Lok Sabha from Rajnandgaon

== See also ==
- Political families of India
- List of people from Chhattisgarh
