= Bastar Lok Sabha constituency =

Lok Sabha constituency in Chhattisgarh

Coordinates: 19.2°N 81.9°E

Bastar CG-10
- Lok Sabha constituency
- Interactive Map Outlining Bastar Lok Sabha constituency

Constituency details
- Country: India
- Region: Central India
- State: Chhattisgarh
- Assembly constituencies: Kondagaon; Narayanpur; Bastar; Jagdalpur; Chitrakot; Dantewara; Bijapur; Konta
- Established: 1952
- Total electors: 14,72,207
- Reservation: ST

Member of Parliament
- 18th Lok Sabha
- Incumbent Mahesh Kashyap
- Party: Bharatiya Janata Party
- Elected year: 2024

Bastar Lok Sabha constituency is one of the 11 Lok Sabha (parliamentary) constituencies in Chhattisgarh state in central India. This Lok Sabha constituency is reserved for the Scheduled Tribes (ST) candidates.

== Assembly segments ==
Like most other Lok Sabha seats in MP and Chhattisgarh, with few seats like Durg (which has nine assembly segments under it) being exceptions, Bastar Lok Sabha seat has 8 assembly seats as its segments. Bastar seat is composed of the following assembly segments:

#	Name	District	Member	Party	Leading (in 2024)
83	Kondagaon (ST)	Kondagaon	Lata Usendi	BJP	BJP
84	Narayanpur (ST)	Narayanpur	Kedar Nath Kashyap	BJP	BJP
85	Bastar (ST)	Bastar	Lakheshwar Baghel	INC	INC
86	Jagdalpur	Bastar	Kiran Singh Deo	BJP	BJP
87	Chitrakot (ST)	Bastar	Vinayak Goyal	BJP	BJP
88	Dantewara (ST)	Dantewada	Chaitram Atami	BJP	BJP
89	Bijapur (ST)	Bijapur	Vikram Mandavi	INC	INC
90	Konta (ST)	Sukma	Kawasi Lakhma	INC	BJP

== Members of Parliament ==
Year	Member	Party
1952	Muchaki Kosa	Independent
1957	Surti Kistaiya	Indian National Congress
1962	Lakhmu Bhawani	Independent
1967	Jhadoo Ram Sunder Lal	Independent
1971	Lambodar Baliar	Independent
1977	Drig Pal Shah	Janata Party
1980	Laxman Karma	Indian National Congress
1984	Manku Ram Sodhi	Indian National Congress
1989	Manku Ram Sodhi	Indian National Congress
1991	Manku Ram Sodhi	Indian National Congress
1996	Mahendra Karma	Independent
1998	Baliram Kashyap	Bharatiya Janata Party
1999	Baliram Kashyap	Bharatiya Janata Party
2004	Baliram Kashyap	Bharatiya Janata Party
2009	Baliram Kashyap	Bharatiya Janata Party
2011^	Dinesh Kashyap	Bharatiya Janata Party
2014	Dinesh Kashyap	Bharatiya Janata Party
2019	Deepak Baij	Indian National Congress
2024	Mahesh Kashyap	Bharatiya Janata Party

^ by poll

== Election results ==
=== 2024 ===
2024 Indian general election: Bastar
Party	Candidate	Votes	%	±%
BJP	Mahesh Kashyap	458,398	45.50	▲5.67
INC	Kawasi Lakhma	4,03,153	40.02	▼4.08
NOTA	None of the Above	36,758	3.65	▼0.91
CPI	Phool Singh Kachlam	35,887	3.56	▼0.65
BSP	Aaytu Ram Mandavi	19,647	1.95	▼1.39
GGP	Tikam Nagavanshi	3,042	0.30	
Majority		55,245	5.48	▲1.21
Turnout		10,08,923	68.46	
BJP gain from INC		Swing		

=== 2019 ===
2019 Indian general elections: Bastar
Party	Candidate	Votes	%	±%
INC	Deepak Baij	402,527	44.10	▲10.14
BJP	Baiduram Kashyap	3,63,545	39.83	▼10.28
NOTA	None of the Above	41,667	4.56	▼0.48
CPI	Ramu Ram Maurya	38,395	4.21	▼0.19
BSP	Aaytu Ram Mandavi	30,449	3.34	N/A
Majority		38,982	4.27	▼11.88
Turnout		9,13,761	66.26	▲6.94
INC gain from BJP		Swing		

=== General election 2014 ===
2014 Indian general elections: Bastar
Party	Candidate	Votes	%	±%
BJP	Dinesh Kashyap	385,829	50.11	▲2.66
INC	Deepak Karma (Bunty)	2,61,470	33.96	▲1.22
NOTA	None of the Above	38,772	5.04	N/A
CPI	Bimala Sori	33,883	4.40	▼3.83
AAP	Soni Sori	16,903	2.20	New
Majority		1,24,359	16.15	▲1.44
Turnout		7,69,972	59.32	▲8.74
BJP hold		Swing		

=== Bypoll 2011 ===
Bye-election, 2011: Bastar
Party	Candidate	Votes	%	±%
BJP	Dinesh Kashyap	286,691	47.45	▲3.29
INC	Kawasi Lakhma	1,97,807	32.74	▲6.34
CPI	Rama Sodhi	49,727	8.23	▼5.66
IND	Kawasi Lakhma	32,969	5.46	N/A
Majority		88,884	14.71	▼3.04
Turnout		6,04,245	50.58	▲3.25
BJP hold		Swing		

=== General election 2009 ===
2009 Indian general elections: Bastar
Party	Candidate	Votes	%	±%
BJP	Baliram Kashyap	249,373	44.16	
INC	Shankar Sodi	1,49,111	26.40	
CPI	Manish Kunjam	78,420	13.89	
BSP	Aytu Ram Mandavi	35,098	6.21	
Majority		1,00,262	17.75	
Turnout		5,64,711	47.33	
BJP hold		Swing		

== See also ==
- Bastar district
- Dantewada district
- List of constituencies of the Lok Sabha
