= Pranav Kumar Marpachi =

Indian politician

Pranav Kumar Dewangan

Member of Chhattisgarh Legislative Assembly
- Incumbent
- Assumed office 2023
- Preceded by: Krishna Kumar Dhruw
- Constituency: Marwahi

Personal details
- Party: Bharatiya Janata Party
- Profession: Politician

Pranav Kumar marpachi is an Indian politician from Chhattisgarh. He is an MLA from Marwahi Assembly constituency, which is a reserved constituency for Scheduled Tribes community, in Gaurela-Pendra-Marwahi district. He won the 2023 Chhattisgarh Legislative Assembly election, representing the Bharatiya Janata Party.

== Early life and education ==
Dewangan is from Marwahi, Gaurela-Pendra-Marwahi district, Chhattisgarh. His wife is a teacher. He completed his Post Graduation at Atal Bihari Vajpayee University, Bilaspur.

== Career ==
Dewangan won from Marwahi Assembly constituency, representing the Bharatiya Janata Party in the 2023 Chhattisgarh Legislative Assembly election. He polled 51,960 votes and defeated his nearest rival, Gulab Raj of Janta Congress Chhattisgarh (J), by a margin of 12,078 votes.
