= Chhattisgarh Pradesh Congress Committee =

Chhattisgarh affiliate of the Indian National Congress

- President: Deepak Baij
- Chairman: Charan Das Mahant
- Founded: 2000
- Split from: MPCC
- Headquarters: Rajiv Bhavan Raipur, Chhattisgarh
- Youth wing: Chhattisgarh Youth Congress
- Women's wing: Chhattisgarh Pradesh Mahila Congress Committee
- Ideology: Populism; Social liberalism; Democratic socialism; Social democracy; Secularism
- Political position: Centre
- ECI status: A State Unit of Indian National Congress
- Alliance: Indian National Developmental Inclusive Alliance
- Seats in Rajya Sabha: 3 / 5
- Seats in Lok Sabha: 1 / 11
- Seats in Chhattisgarh Legislative Assembly: 35 / 90

Election symbol

Website
- http://www.cgpcc.in/

The Chhattisgarh Pradesh Congress Committee (CPCC) is the state wing of the Indian National Congress serving in Chhattisgarh. It is responsible for organizing and coordinating the party's activities and campaigns within the state, as well as selecting candidates for local, state, and national elections. The current president of the Chhattisgarh Pradesh Congress Committee is Deepak Baij. The committee has been part of the Congress in the state's politics since the formation of the state in 2000.

== Structure and composition ==
| S.No. | Name | Designation |
|---|---|---|
| 1. | Sachin Pilot | AICC Incharge |
| 2. | Deepak Baij | President; Chhattisgarh Pradesh Congress Committee |
| 3. | Phulo Devi Netam | President; Chhattisgarh Pradesh Mahila Congress |
| 4. | Akash Sharma | President; Chhattisgarh Pradesh Youth Congress |
| 5. | Neeraj Pandey | President; Chhattisgarh Pradesh NSUI |

== Electoral performance ==
=== Chhattisgarh Legislative Assembly election ===
| Year | Party leader | Seats won | Change in seats | Outcome |
|---|---|---|---|---|
| 2003 | Ajit Jogi | 37 / 90 | New | Opposition |
| 2008 | Ajit Jogi | 38 / 90 | ▲1 | Opposition |
| 2013 | Ajit Jogi | 39 / 90 | ▲1 | Opposition |
| 2018 | Bhupesh Baghel | 68 / 90 | ▲29 | Government |
| 2023 | Bhupesh Baghel | 35 / 90 | ▼33 | Opposition |

=== Lok Sabha election ===
Lok Sabha Elections
| Year | Lok Sabha | Seats contested | Seats won | (+/-) in seats | % of votes | Vote swing | Popular vote | Outcome |
|---|---|---|---|---|---|---|---|---|
| 2004 | 14th | 11 | 1 / 11 | 1 | 40.16% | New entry | 28,69,260 | Government |
| 2009 | 15th | 11 | 1 / 11 | Steady | 37.31% | ▼2.85 | 31,92,007 | Government |
| 2014 | 16th | 11 | 1 / 11 | Steady | 39.09% | ▲1.78 | 47,02,813 | Opposition |
| 2019 | 17th | 11 | 2 / 11 | ▲1 | 41.51% | ▲2.42 | 55,69,283 | Opposition |
| 2024 | 18th | 11 | 1 / 11 | ▼1 | 41.06% | ▼0.45 | 61,68,408 | Opposition |

== List of presidents ==
| Sr. NO. | President | Term |
|---|---|---|
| 1. | Charan Das Mahant | 2006–2008 |
| 2. | Dhanendra Sahu | 2008–2011 |
| 3. | Nand Kumar Patel | April 2011 – 25 May 2013 |
| (1). | Charan Das Mahant | 2013–2014 |
| 4. | Bhupesh Baghel | December 2014 – June 2019 |
| 5. | Mohan Markam | 28 June 2019 – 12 July 2023 |
| 6. | Deepak Baij | 12 July 2023 – present |

== List of the chief ministers of Chhattisgarh from the Indian National Congress ==
Following is the list of the chief ministers of Chhattisgarh from Indian National Congress since the formation of the state on 9 November 2000:

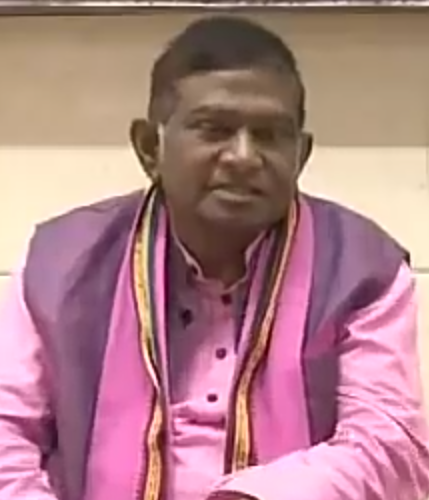
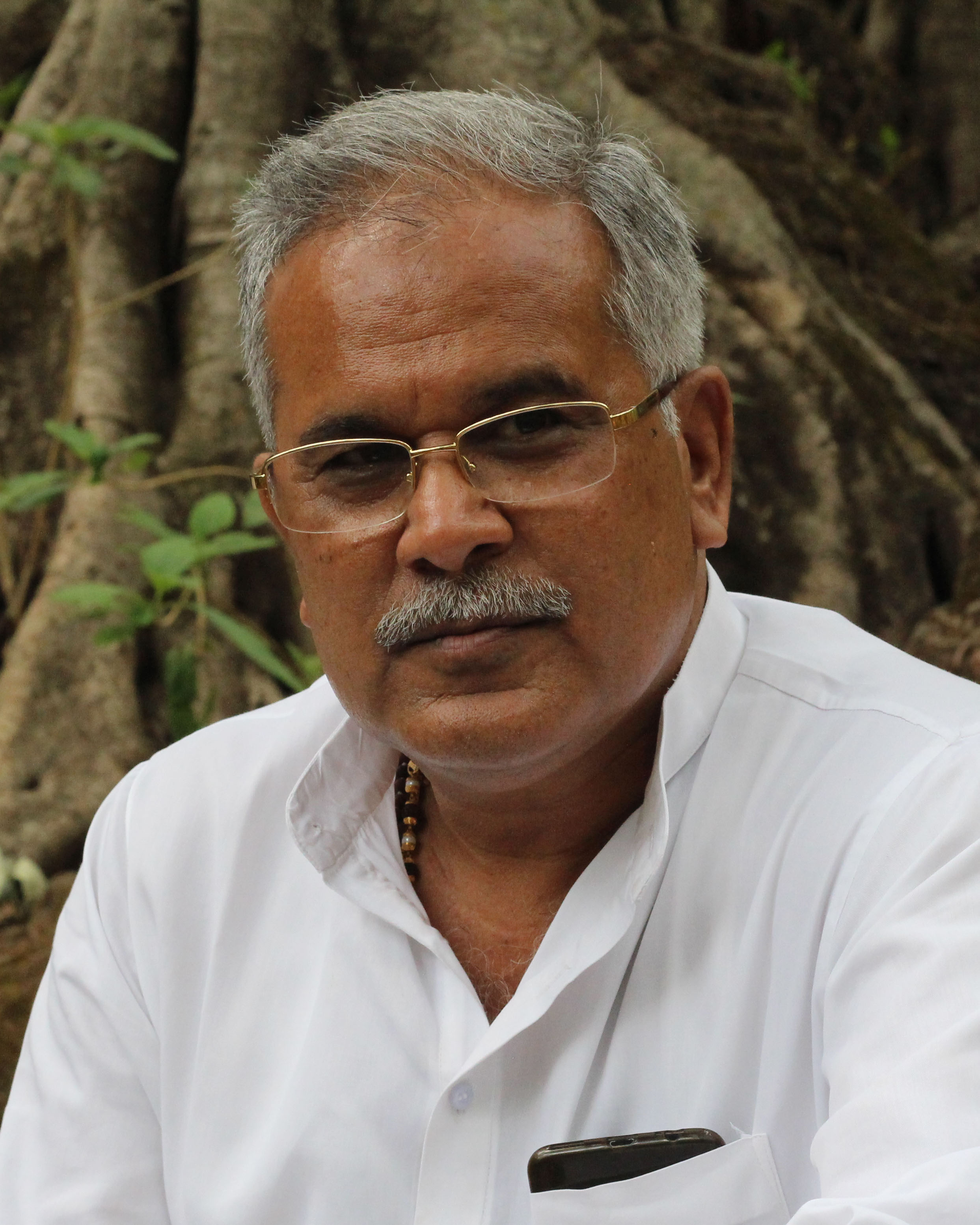
| No. | Chief ministers | Portrait | Term in office | | | Assembly | Constituency |
| No. | Chief ministers | Portrait | Start | End | Tenure | Assembly | Constituency |
|---|---|---|---|---|---|---|---|
| 1 | Ajit Jogi | | 1 November 2000 | 7 December 2003 | 3 years, 34 days | 1st Assembly | Marwahi |
| 2 | Bhupesh Baghel | | 17 December 2018 | 13 December 2023 | 4 years, 361 days | 5th Assembly | Patan |

== District & City Congress Committee ==
| Sr. NO. | District/City | President |
|---|---|---|
| 1. | Balod | Chandresh Hirwani |
| 2. | Durg (Rural) | Rakesh Thakur |
| 3. | Narayanpur | Bisel Nag |
| 4. | Kondagaon | Budhram Netam |
| 5. | Korba (City) | Nathulal Yadav |
| 6. | Korba (Rural) | Manoj Chauhan |
| 7. | Baloda Bazar | Sumitra Ghritlahre |
| 8. | Sarangarh Bilaigarh | Tarachand Devangan |
| 9. | Sarguja | Balkrishna Pathak |
| 10. | Balrampur | Krishna Pratap Singh |
| 11. | Bemetara | Ashish Chhabra |

== See also ==
- Indian National Congress
- Congress Working Committee
- All India Congress Committee
- Pradesh Congress Committee
