= Jagdalpur Assembly constituency =

Legislative Assembly constituency in Chhattisgarh State, India

Coordinates: 19.09°N 82.02°E

Jagdalpur
- Constituency No. 86 for the Chhattisgarh Legislative Assembly

Constituency details
- Country: India
- Region: Central India
- State: Chhattisgarh
- District: Bastar
- Lok Sabha constituency: Bastar
- Established: 1952
- Total electors: 206,226
- Reservation: None

Member of Legislative Assembly
- 6th Chhattisgarh Legislative Assembly
- Incumbent Kiran Singh Deo
- Party: Bharatiya Janata Party
- Elected year: 2023
- Preceded by: Rekhchand Jain

Jagdalpur is one of the 90 Legislative Assembly constituencies of Chhattisgarh state in India.

It is part of Bastar district. As of 2023, it is represented by Kiran Singh Deo of the Bharatiya Janata Party.

== Members of the Legislative Assembly ==
Election	Name	Party
Madhya Pradesh Legislative Assembly
1952	Doomer	Independent politician
1952	Vidyanath	Independent politician
1957	Pravir Chandra Bhanj Deo	Indian National Congress
1957	Derhaprasad	Indian National Congress
1962	Chaitu Mahra	Independent politician
1967	D. Kosha	Bharatiya Jana Sangh
1972	Baliram Kashyap	Bharatiya Jana Sangh
1977	Birendra Pandey	Janata Party
1980	Bhursuram Nag	Indian National Congress
1985	Jhitru Ram Baghel	Indian National Congress
1990	Dinesh Kashyap	Bharatiya Janata Party
1993	Jhitru Ram Bahel	Indian National Congress
1998	Jhitru Ram Bahel	Indian National Congress
Chhattisgarh Legislative Assembly
2003	Subhau Kashyap	Bharatiya Janata Party
2008	Santosh Bafna	Bharatiya Janata Party
2013	Santosh Bafna	Bharatiya Janata Party
2018	Rekhchand Jain	Indian National Congress
2023	Kiran Singh Deo	Bharatiya Janata Party

== Election results ==
=== 2023 ===
2023 Chhattisgarh Legislative Assembly election: Jagdalpur
Party	Candidate	Votes	%	±%
BJP	Kiran Singh Deo	90,336	55.46	+21.51
INC	Jateen Jaiswal	60,502	37.14	−15.78
AAP	Narendra Bhavani	2,638	1.62	
JCC	Navneet Chand	1,489	0.91	−1.03
NOTA	None of the Above	2,836	1.74	+1.09
Majority		29,834	18.32	−0.65
Turnout		162,885	78.98	+0.58
BJP gain from INC		Swing		

=== 2018 ===
Chhattisgarh Legislative Assembly Election, 2018: Jagdalpur
Party	Candidate	Votes	%	±%
INC	Rekhchand Jain	76,556	52.92	
BJP	Santosh Bafna	49,116	33.95	
CPI	Mangalram Kashyap	3,020	2.09	
JCC	Amit Pandey	2,801	1.94	New
Independent	Naseem Qureshi	2,306	1.59	
Independent	Pappuram Nag	1,382	0.96	
NOTA	None of the Above	936	0.65	
Majority		27,440	18.97	
Turnout		143,549	78.40	
INC gain from BJP		Swing		

== See also ==
- List of constituencies of the Chhattisgarh Legislative Assembly
- Bastar district
