= Meduka =

- Location in Chhattisgarh
- Coordinates: 22.85°N 81.89°E
- District: Gaurella-Pendra-Marwahi
- State: Chhattisgarh
- Country: India

Population (2011)
  - Total: 1,697

Languages
  - Spoken: Hindi, Chhattisgarhi

Meduka is a village in Gaurella-Pendra-Marwahi district in the state of Chhattisgarh, India.

== Demographics ==
In the 2011 Census of India, the population was 1,697. 828 were males and 869 were females.

== See also ==
- Gaurella-Pendra-Marwahi district
