= Kondagaon Assembly constituency =

Legislative Assembly constituency in Chhattisgarh State, India

Coordinates: 19.59°N 81.66°E

Kondagaon
- Constituency No. 83 for the Chhattisgarh Legislative Assembly

Constituency details
- Country: India
- Region: Central India
- State: Chhattisgarh
- District: Kondagaon
- Lok Sabha constituency: Bastar
- Established: 2003
- Total electors: 189,137
- Reservation: ST

Member of Legislative Assembly
- 6th Chhattisgarh Legislative Assembly
- Incumbent Lata Usendi
- Party: Bharatiya Janata Party
- Elected year: 2023
- Preceded by: Mohan Markam

Kondagaon is one of the 90 Legislative Assembly constituencies of Chhattisgarh state in India.

It is part of Kondagaon district and is reserved for candidates belonging to the Scheduled Tribes.

== Members of the Legislative Assembly ==
Election	Name	Party
Madhya Pradesh Legislative Assembly
Before 1966: Constituency does not exist
1967	M. Lachhooram	Independent politician
1972	Manku Ram Sodi	Indian National Congress
1977	Manku Ram Sodi	Indian National Congress
1980	Manku Ram Sodi	Indian National Congress
1985	Sukhlal Mandavi	Indian National Congress
1990	Mangal Ram Usendi	Bharatiya Janata Party
1993	Shankar Sodi	Indian National Congress
1998	Shankar Sodi	Indian National Congress
Chhattisgarh Legislative Assembly
2003	Lata Usendi	Bharatiya Janata Party
2008	Lata Usendi	Bharatiya Janata Party
2013	Mohan Markam	Indian National Congress
2018	Mohan Markam	Indian National Congress
2023	Lata Usendi	Bharatiya Janata Party

== Election results ==
=== 2023 ===
2023 Chhattisgarh Legislative Assembly election: Kondagaon
Party	Candidate	Votes	%	±%
BJP	Lata Usendi	80,465	51.32	+8.02
INC	Mohan Markam	61,893	39.47	−5.13
Independent	Budhsingh Netam	2,960	1.89	
BSP	Girdhar Netam	2,236	1.43	−2.02
JCC	Shankar Netam	2,141	1.37	
Sarv Adi Dal	Gyanprakash Korram	1,800	1.15	
NOTA	None of the Above	3,214	2.05	−1.68
Majority		18,572	11.85	+10.55
Turnout		156,791	82.9	−0.79
BJP gain from INC		Swing		

=== 2018 ===
Chhattisgarh Legislative Assembly Election, 2018: Kondagaon
Party	Candidate	Votes	%	±%
INC	Mohan Markam	61,582	44.60	
BJP	Lata Usendi	59,786	43.30	
BSP	Narendra Netam	4,769	3.45	
CPI	Ramchandra Nag	3,883	2.81	
Independent	Sukharam Netam	2,906	2.10	
NOTA	None of the Above	5,146	3.73	
Majority		1,796	1.30	
Turnout		137,597	83.69	
INC hold		Swing		

== See also ==
- List of constituencies of the Chhattisgarh Legislative Assembly
- Kondagaon district
