= Mahendra Karma =

Indian politician

Leader of the Opposition, Chhattisgarh Legislative Assembly
- In office 22 December 2003 – 13 December 2008
- Preceded by: Nand Kumar Sai
- Succeeded by: Ravindra Choubey

Minister of Industry and Commerce, Government of Chhattisgarh
- In office November 2000 – December 2003

Member of Chhattisgarh Legislative Assembly
- In office 1998–2008
- Preceded by: Nandaram Sori
- Succeeded by: Bhima Mandavi
- Constituency: Dantewada

Member of Madhya Pradesh Legislative Assembly
- In office 1980–1985
- Preceded by: Sukuldhar Bhawani
- Succeeded by: Laxman Karma
- Constituency: Dantewada

Member of Parliament, Lok Sabha
- In office 1996-1998
- Preceded by: Manku Ram Sodhi
- Succeeded by: Baliram Kashyap
- Constituency: Bastar, Madhya Pradesh

Personal details
- Born: 5 August 1950 Dantewada, Madhya Pradesh, India
- Died: 25 May 2013 (aged 62) Sukma, Chhattisgarh, India
- Education: Graduate
- Alma mater: Danteshwari College, Jagdalpur.

Mahendra Karma (5 August 1950 – 25 May 2013) was an Indian political leader belonging to Indian National Congress from Chhattisgarh. He was the leader of the opposition in the Chhattisgarh Vidhan Sabha (Note: Regional legislative assembly) from 2004 to 2008. In 2005, he played a top role in organising the Salwa Judum movement against Naxalites, a Maoist group in Chhattisgarh. He was a Minister of Industry and Commerce in the Ajit Jogi cabinet since the state formation in 2000 to 2004. He was assassinated by Naxalites on 25 May 2013 in the 2013 Naxal attack in Darbha valley while returning from a Parivartan Rally meeting organised by his party in Sukma.

== Early life and family ==
Karma was a tribal leader from the Bastar region. He was born on 5 August 1950 to Daraboda Karma in the Dantewada district who was himself a powerful leader in the undivided Bastar region. He received his higher secondary education from Bastar Higher Secondary School, Jagdalpur in 1969 and completed his graduation from Danteshwary College in 1975. His elder brother Lakshman Karma had also been a Member of Parliament. Earlier, Naxalties had killed his brother Podiyaram who was president of the Bhairamgad Janpad Panchayat. They had also killed around 20 of his relatives in the subsequent period. His son Chavindra Karma was also Jila Panchayat Chairman of Dantewada and is in hit list of Maoist and Deepak Karma is currently (as of 2013), Nagar Panchayat president of Dantewada.

== Politics ==
Karma started his political career with the Communist Party of India (CPI). He won the 1980 general elections on the ticket of CPI. Later on he joined the Indian National Congress. He was then elected as the first president of the Zila Panchayat of the undivided Bastar. In 1996 general elections, Karma was elected to the Loksabha as a Member of Parliament (MP) on an independent ticket from Bastar. Later on he returned to the Congress. He was elected as a Member of Legislative Assembly from Dantewada and was appointed as a Minister of Prisons in the Digvijaya Singh cabinet in the undivided Madhya Pradesh. He served as the Minister of Industry and Commerce after Chhattisgarh was carved out from its parent state Madhya Pradesh in the Ajit Jogi cabinet though he was known as a political adversary of Jogi. In 2003, his party Indian National Congress suffered defeat in the legislative assembly elections and he was made the leader of the opposition in the state assembly. He represented the Dantewada constituency. The Congress also lost the 2008 assembly elections when BJP swept 10 out of the 11 seats in Bastar. He had secured 158,520 votes (35.19%). In the region, he was known as "Bastar Tiger"-for making a tough stand against the regional Maoist insurgency.

=== Anti-Naxal movement ===
Karma was seen as the driving force behind anti-Naxal movements in Chhattisgarh. In 1991, he had started Jan Jagran Abhiyan composed mostly of local traders and businessmen. The movement collapsed after some time. Because of his role against Maoists, Karma was a high-value target. Owing to the threat perception to his life by the Maoists, he was given Z+ security for his protection.

== Death ==
On 25 May 2013, Karma was killed in a Maoist attack in Darbha along with several other party leaders including Nand Kumar Patel when they were returning from a political rally.

On 27 May, the Naxalites claimed responsibility for the attack by issuing a statement which called the attack "the punishment for Salwa Judum founder Mahendra Karma for the atrocities done by the Salwa Judum-Nand Kumar Patel was suppressing people. It was in his tenure in the Centre when paramilitary forces were deployed in the Bastar area."

The newly elected Congress government of Chhattisgarh set up a Special Investigation Team (SIT) under Vivekanand Sinha on 2 January 2019 to probe into the 2013 incident.

Bastar Vishwavidyalaya has been rechristened Shaheed Mahendra Karma Vishwavidyalaya.

== See also ==
- List of assassinated Indian politicians
