= Chitrakot Assembly constituency =

Legislative Assembly constituency in Chhattisgarh State, India

Coordinates: 19.25°N 81.76°E

Chitrakot
- Constituency No. 87 for the Chhattisgarh Legislative Assembly

Constituency details
- Country: India
- Region: Central India
- State: Chhattisgarh
- District: Bastar
- Lok Sabha constituency: Bastar
- Established: 2008
- Total electors: 177,625
- Reservation: ST

Member of Legislative Assembly
- 6th Chhattisgarh Legislative Assembly
- Incumbent Vinayak Goyal
- Party: Bhartiya Janata Party
- Elected year: 2023
- Preceded by: Rajman Venjam

Chitrakot is one of the 90 Legislative Assembly constituencies of Chhattisgarh state in India.

It comprises parts of Darbha tehsil and Lohandiguda, Tokapal, and Bastanar tehsils in Bastar district, and is reserved for candidates belonging to the Scheduled Tribes.

== Members of the Legislative Assembly ==
Election	Name	Party
Madhya Pradesh Legislative Assembly
1952	Dora	Independent politician
1957	Sukhdu	Indian National Congress
1962	Paklu Joga	Independent politician
1967	M. Ganga	Samyukta Socialist Party
1972	Ramakonda	Indian National Congress
1977	Lakhan Jaisngh	Janata Party
1980	Lakhan Jaisngh	Bharatiya Janata Party
1985	A. K. Turam Nag	Indian National Congress
1990	Dhani Ram Pujari	Bharatiya Janata Party
1993	Dhani Ram Pujari	Bharatiya Janata Party
1998	Pratibha Shah	Indian National Congress
Chhattisgarh Legislative Assembly
2003	Lachhuram Kashyap	Bharatiya Janata Party
2008	Baiduram Kashyap	Bharatiya Janata Party
2013	Deepak Baij	Indian National Congress
2018	Deepak Baij	Indian National Congress
2019^	Rajman Venjam	Indian National Congress
2023	Vinayak Goyal	Bharatiya Janata Party

^by-election

== Election results ==
=== 2023 ===
2023 Chhattisgarh Legislative Assembly election: Chitrakot
Party	Candidate	Votes	%	±%
BJP	Vinayak Goyal	63,954	43.73	+10.03
INC	Deepak Baij	55,584	38.01	−9.30
CPI	Ramu Ram Mourya	5,051	3.45	−1.84
AAP	Bomdha Mandavi	4,644	3.18	
JCC	Bharat Kashyap	4,184	2.86	−2.11
BSP	Sannu Poyam	3,493	2.39	
Sarv Adi Dal	Ramlal Podiyam	2,028	1.39	
NOTA	None of the Above	7,310	5.00	+0.26
Majority		8,370	5.72	−7.89
Turnout		146,248	82.34	+4.22
BJP gain from INC		Swing		

=== 2019 ===
2019 Chhattisgarh Legislative Assembly by-election: Chitrakot
Party	Candidate	Votes	%	±%
INC	Rajman Venjam	62,097	47.31	+0.38
BJP	Lachhuram Kashyap	44,235	33.70	+0.09
CPI	Hidmo Ram Mandavi	6,948	5.29	
JCC	Bomdha Mandavi	6,527	4.97	−0.65
API	Lakheshwar Kawasi	2,650	2.02	+0.68
Independent	Ritika Karma	2,575	1.96	
NOTA	None of the Above	6,225	4.74	−2.62
Majority		17,862	13.61	+0.29
Turnout		131,257	78.12	−2.57
INC hold		Swing		

=== 2018 ===
Chhattisgarh Legislative Assembly Election, 2018: Chitrakot
Party	Candidate	Votes	%	±%
INC	Deepak Baij	62,616	46.93	
BJP	Lachhuram Kashyap	44,846	33.61	
JCC	Tankeshwar Bhardwaj	7,494	5.62	
Independent	Dharmuram Kashyap	3,032	2.27	
SS	Suresh Kawasi	2,297	1.72	
API	Lakheshwar Kawasi	1,791	1.34	
AAP	Dantiram Poyam	1,517	1.14	
NOTA	None of the Above	9,824	7.36	
Majority		17,770	13.32	
Turnout		132,781	80.69	
INC hold		Swing		

== See also ==
- List of constituencies of the Chhattisgarh Legislative Assembly
- Bastar district
