= Drig Pal Shah =

Indian politician (born 1941)

Member of Parliament, Lok Sabha
- In office 1977–1980
- Preceded by: Lambodar Baliar
- Succeeded by: Laxman Karma
- Constituency: Bastar

Personal details
- Born: 26 July 1941 (age 84) Jagadalpur, India
- Party: Janata Party
- Other political affiliations: Bharatiya Lok Dal
- Education: Matriculate

Drig Pal Shah (born 26 July 1941) is an Indian politician from Janata Party and was the member of 6th Lok Sabha from Bastar constituency then in Madhya Pradesh in 1977 Indian elections. He started his political career in 1967 when he was elected to Madhya Pradesh Legislative Assembly.
