= Vinayak Goyal =

Indian politician

Vinayak Goyal (born 1977) is an Indian politician from Chhattisgarh. He is an MLA from Chitrakot Assembly constituency, which is reserved for Scheduled Tribes community, in Bastar district. He won the 2023 Chhattisgarh Legislative Assembly election, representing the Bharatiya Janata Party.

== Early life and education ==
Goyal is from Chitrakot, Bastar district, Chhattisgarh. His father, Manglu Goyal, is a farmer. He passed Class 12 at Government High School, Potanar, Tokapal tehsil, Bastar District. He runs a food business and also does farming.

== Career ==
Goyal won from Chitrakot Assembly constituency representing the Bharatiya Janata Party in the 2023 Chhattisgarh Legislative Assembly election. He polled 63,954 votes and defeated his nearest rival, Deepak Bajj of the Indian National Congress, by a margin of 8,370 votes.
