= Surti Kistaiya =

Indian politician (1923–1999)

Member of Parliament, Lok Sabha
- In office 1957–1962
- Preceded by: Muchaki Kosa
- Succeeded by: Lakhmu Bhawani
- Constituency: Bastar, Madhya Pradesh

Personal details
- Born: 1 May 1923 Mangapeta Bastar district, British India (now Chhattisgarh)
- Died: 22 October 1999 (aged 76) Madhya Pradesh, India
- Party: Indian National Congress
- Spouse: Poorna

Surti Kistaiya (1 May 1923 – 22 October 1999) was an Indian politician. He was elected to the Lok Sabha, the lower house of the Parliament of India from Bastar, Madhya Pradesh as a member of the Indian National Congress. Kistaiya died in Madhya Pradesh on 22 October 1999, at the age of 76.
