= 15th Lok Sabha =

Lower House members elected in 2009

←	14th	16th	→
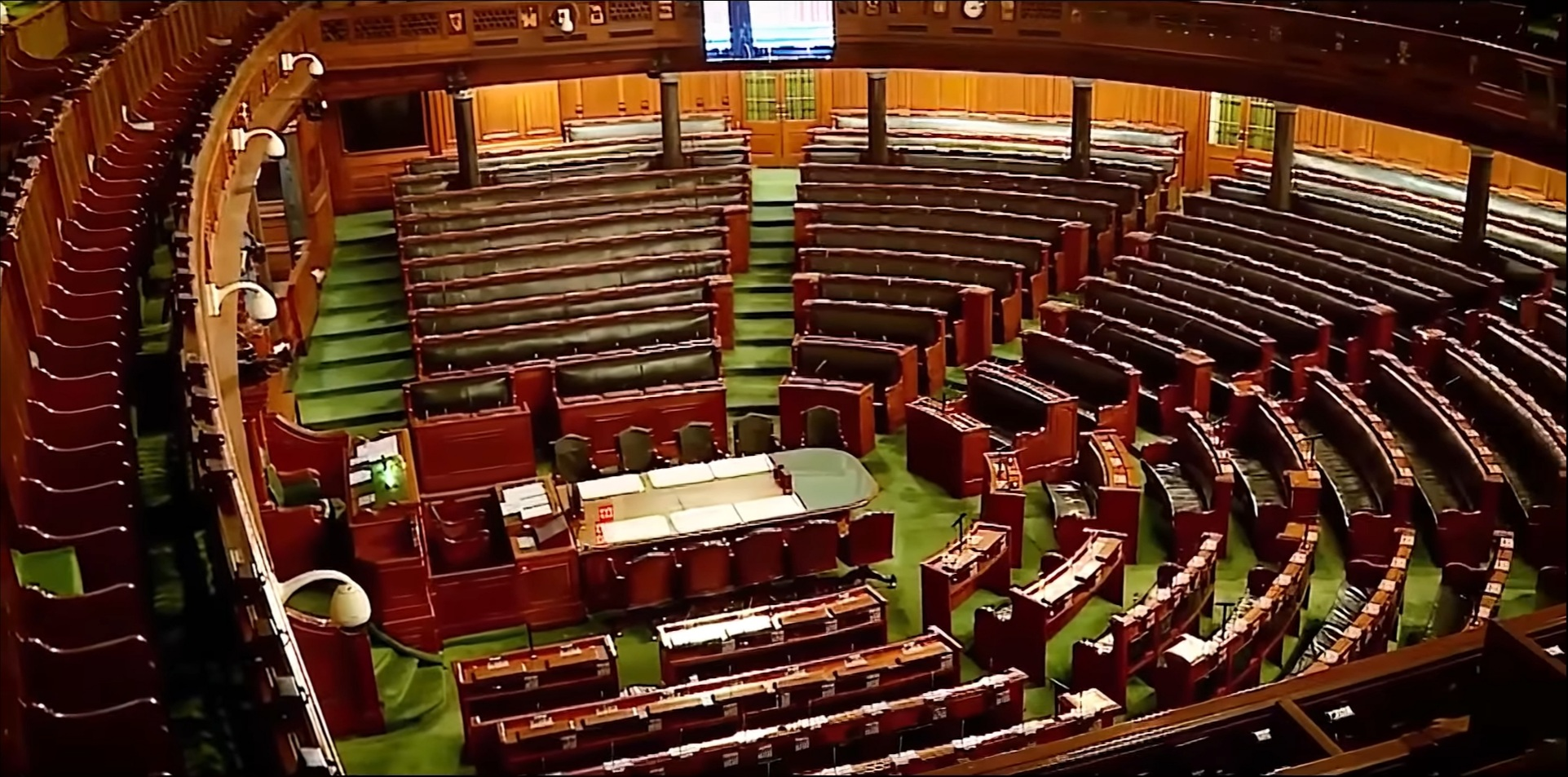
- View of Lok Sabha chamber in the Old Parliament House, New Delhi

Overview
- Legislative body: Indian Parliament
- Term: 1 June 2009 - 18 January 2014
- Election: 2009 Indian general election
- Government: Second Manmohan Singh ministry

Sovereign
- President: Pratibha Patil; Pranab Mukherjee
- Vice President: Hamid Ansari

House of the People
- Members: 545
- Speaker of the House: Meira Kumar
- Leader of the House: Pranab Mukherjee; Sushil Kumar Shinde
- Prime Minister: Manmohan Singh
- Leader of the Opposition: Sushma Swaraj
- Party control: United Progressive Alliance

Members of the 15th Lok Sabha were elected during the 2009 general election in India. It was dissolved on 18 January 2014 by President Pranab Mukherjee.

Indian National Congress-led United Progressive Alliance won 44 more seats than the previous 14th Lok Sabha. The next 16th Lok Sabha was convened after 2014 Indian general election.

The Second Manmohan Singh ministry introduced a total of 222 Bills (apart from Finance and Appropriations Bills) in the 15th Lok Sabha. A total of 165 Bills were passed by the House, including bills introduced in previous Lok Sabhas.

14 sitting members from Rajya Sabha, the Upper House of Indian Parliament, were elected to 15th Lok Sabha after the 2009 Indian general election.

== Bills ==
During the tenure of the 15th Lok Sabha, 71% of the bills introduced were referred to Parliamentary committees for examination.

== Members ==
- Speaker: Meira Kumar, INC, Sasaram, Bihar
- Deputy Speaker: Kariya Munda, BJP, Khunti, Jharkhand
- Leader of the House: Pranab Mukherjee, INC, Jangipur, West Bengal (May, 2009 - 2012) (He went on to become the 13th President of India in 2012)

Sushil Kumar Shinde, INC, Solapur, Maharashtra (2012 - May, 2014)

- Leader of the Opposition: Sushma Swaraj, BJP, Vidisha, Madhya Pradesh (December, 2009 - May 2014)
- Deputy Leader of the Opposition: Sushma Swaraj, BJP, Vidisha, Madhya Pradesh (June, 2009 - December 2009) (She went on to become the 11th leader of opposition in lok sabha in 2009)

Gopinath Munde, BJP, Beed, Maharashtra (December 2009 - May, 2014)

- Secretary General:
  - P.D.T. Achary
  - T. K. Viswanathan

=== Number of members by the alliance in Lok Sabha ===
Members of the 15th Lok Sabha by political party and alliance:

Alliances	Party	Seats	Leader
United Progressive Alliance 262	Indian National Congress	206	Sushil Kumar Shinde
United Progressive Alliance 262	All India Trinamool Congress	19	Sudip Bandyopadhyay
United Progressive Alliance 262	Dravida Munnetra Kazhagam	18	T R Balu
United Progressive Alliance 262	Nationalist Congress Party	9	Sharad Pawar
United Progressive Alliance 262	Rashtriya Janata Dal	4	Lalu Prasad Yadav
United Progressive Alliance 262	Jammu & Kashmir National Conference	3	
United Progressive Alliance 262	Bodoland People's Front	1	
United Progressive Alliance 262	Indian Union Muslim League	2	
National Democratic Alliance; Seats: 167	Bharatiya Janata Party	117	Sushma Swaraj
National Democratic Alliance; Seats: 167	Janata Dal (United)	20	
National Democratic Alliance; Seats: 167	Shiv Sena	11	
National Democratic Alliance; Seats: 167	All India Anna Dravida Munnetra Kazhagam (supported)	9	
National Democratic Alliance; Seats: 167	Shiromani Akali Dal	4	
National Democratic Alliance; Seats: 167	Bharat Rashtra Samithi (supported)	2	K. Chandrashekar Rao
National Democratic Alliance; Seats: 167	Asom Gana Parishad	1	
National Democratic Alliance; Seats: 167	Haryana Janhit Congress	1	
National Democratic Alliance; Seats: 167	Sikkim Democratic Front	1	
National Democratic Alliance; Seats: 167	Bodoland People's Front	1	
Third Front; Seats: 75	Communist Party of India (Marxist)	15	Basudev Acharia
Third Front; Seats: 75	Communist Party of India	4	Gurudas Dasgupta
Third Front; Seats: 75	Revolutionary Socialist Party	2	Prasanta Kumar Majumdar
Third Front; Seats: 75	All India Forward Bloc	2	Narahari Mahato
Third Front; Seats: 75	Bahujan Samaj Party	21	
Third Front; Seats: 75	Biju Janata Dal	14	
Third Front; Seats: 75	Telugu Desam Party	6	Nama Nageswara Rao
Third Front; Seats: 75	Janata Dal (Secular)	1	
Third Front; Seats: 75	Marumalarchi Dravida Munnetra Kazhagam	1	
Fourth Front; Seats: 26	Samajwadi Party	22	
Fourth Front; Seats: 26	Rashtriya Janata Dal	4	
Other Parties and Independents; Seats: 21
Other Parties and Independents; Seats: 21	Jharkhand Vikas Morcha (Prajatantrik)	2	
Other Parties and Independents; Seats: 21	YSR Congress Party	2	Y. S. Jagan Mohan Reddy
Other Parties and Independents; Seats: 21	Swabhimani Paksha	1	
Other Parties and Independents; Seats: 21	Bahujan Vikas Aaghadi	1	
Other Parties and Independents; Seats: 21	All India United Democratic Front	1	
Other Parties and Independents; Seats: 21	All India Majlis-e-Ittehadul Muslimeen	1	
Other Parties and Independents; Seats: 21	Viduthalai Chiruthaigal Katchi	1	
Other Parties and Independents; Seats: 21	Socialist Unity Centre of India (Communist)	1	
Other Parties and Independents; Seats: 21	Independents	9	
Other Parties and Independents; Seats: 21	Nominated	2	
Other Parties and Independents; Seats: 21	Total		545

=== List of members by political party ===
Members by political party in 15th Lok Sabha are given below-

S.No.	Party name	Party flag	Number of MPs	Leader in Loksabha
1	Indian National Congress (INC)		222	Sushil Kumar Shinde
2	Bharatiya Janata Party (BJP)		112	Sushma Swaraj
3	Samajwadi Party (SP)		21	Mulayam Singh Yadav
4	Bahujan Samaj Party (BSP)		21	Dara Singh Chauhan
5	Janata Dal (United) (JD(U))		19	Ram Sundar Das
6	All India Trinamool Congress (AITC)		18	Sudip Bandyopadhyay
7	Dravida Munnetra Kazhagam (DMK)		18	T R Balu
8	Communist Party of India (Marxist) (CPI(M))		16	Basudeb Acharia
9	Biju Janata Dal (BJD)		14	Arjun Charan Sethi
10	Shiv Sena (SS)		10	Anant Geete
11	All India Anna Dravida Munnetra Kazhagam (AIADMK)		9	M. Thambidurai
12	Nationalist Congress Party (NCP)		8	Sharad Pawar
13	Independent (Ind.)		7	
14	Telugu Desam Party (TDP)		6	Nama Nageswara Rao
15	Rashtriya Lok Dal (RLD)		5	
16	Communist Party of India (CPI)		4	Gurudas Dasgupta
17	Shiromani Akali Dal (SAD)		4	Rattan Singh Ajnala
18	Jammu and Kashmir National Conference (J&KNC)		3	
19	Rashtriya Janata Dal (RJD)		3	
20	All India Forward Bloc (AIFB)		2	Narahari Mahato
21	Muslim League Kerala State Committee (MLKSC)		2	E Ahamed
22	Jharkhand Mukti Morcha (JMM)		2	
23	Jharkhand Vikas Morcha (Prajatantrik) (JVM(P))	Comb	2	Babu Lal Marandi
24	Revolutionary Socialist Party (India) (RSP)		2	
25	Telangana Rashtra Samithi (TRS)		2	K. Chandrasekhar Rao
26	YSR Congress Party (YSRCP)		2	Y. S. Jagan Mohan Reddy
27	All India Majlis-e-Ittehadul Muslimeen (AIMIM)		1	Asaduddin Owaisi
28	All India United Democratic Front (AIUDF)		1	Badruddin Ajmal
29	Asom Gana Parishad (AGP)		1	Joseph Toppo
30	Bahujan Vikas Aaghadi (BVA)		1	Baliram Sukur Jadhav
31	Bodoland People's Front (BPF)		1	Sansuma Khunggur Bwiswmuthiary
32	Haryana Janhit Congress (BL) (HJC(BL))		1	Kuldeep Bishnoi
33	Janata Dal (Secular) (JD(S))		1	
34	Kerala Congress (Mani) (KC(M))		1	Jose K Mani
35	Marumalarchi Dravida Munnetra Kazhagam (MDMK)		1	A. Ganeshamurthi
36	Sikkim Democratic Front (SDF)		1	Prem Das Rai
37	Swabhimani Paksha (SWP)		1	Raju Shetti
38	Socialist Unity Centre of India (Communist) (SUCI(C))		1	Tarun Mandal
39	Viduthalai Chiruthaigal Katchi (VCK)		1	Thol. Thirumavalavan
-	Vacant Constituencies		22	-

=== Cabinet ===
Prime Minister	Manmohan Singh	2009–2014

Ministry	Minister	Term
Agriculture and Food processing industries	Sharad Pawar	2009–2014
Coal	Sriprakash Jaiswal	2009–2014
Civil Aviation	Ajit Singh	2009–2014
Chemicals and Fertilizers	M.K. Azhagiri	2009–2013 (resigned after DMK withdrew support)
Commerce and Industry	Anand Sharma	2009–2014
Communications and Information Technology	Kapil Sibal	2009–2014
Consumer Affairs, Food, and Public Distribution	Sharad Pawar	2009–2014
Defence	A.K. Antony	2009–2014
Earth Sciences	Jaipal Reddy	2012–2014 2011 – 2012 2011 – 2011(Due to his demise) 2009 – 2011
Environment and Forests	Veerappa Moily Jayanthi Natarajan Jairam Ramesh	2013-2014 2011–2013 2009 – 2011
External Affairs	Salman Khurshid S.M. Krishna	2012–2014 2009 – 2012
Finance	P. Chidambaram Pranab Mukherjee	2012–2014 2009 – 2012 (He was elected President of India in JULY 2012)
Food Processing industries	Sharad Pawar	2009–2014
Health and Family Welfare	Ghulam Nabi Azad	2009–2014
Heavy Industries and Public Enterprises	Praful Patel	2011–2014
Home Affairs	Sushil Kumar Shinde P. Chidambaram	2012–2014 2009 – 2012
Information and Broadcasting	Ambika Soni	2009–2014
Labour and Employment	Mallikarjun Kharge	2009–2014
Law and Justice	Kapil Sibal Ashwani Kumar Salman Khurshid	2013–2014 2012 – 2013 (resigned after allegations in Coalgate) 2009 – 2012
Mines	Dinsha Patel B.K. Handique	2012–2014 2009 – 2012
New and Renewable Energy	S. Jagathrakshakan Farooq Abdullah	2012–2014 2009 – 2012
Overseas Indian Affairs	Vayalar Ravi	2009–2014
Parliamentary Affairs	Kamal Nath Pawan Kumar Bansal	2012–2014 2009 – 2012
Petroleum and Natural Gas	Veerappa Moily Jaipal Reddy	2012–2014 2009 – 2012
Power	Jyotiraditya Madhavrao Scindia Veerappa Moily Sushil Kumar Shinde	2012–2014 July 2012 – Oct. 2012 2009 – 2012
Railways	Mallikarjun Kharge C.P. Joshi Pawan Kumar Bansal C.P. Joshi Mukul Roy Dinesh Trivedi Manmohan Singh (Additional Charge) Mamata Banerjee	17 June 2013 – 2014 2013-2013 2012 – 2013 (resigned after allegations of bribery) Sept. 2012 – Oct. 2012 Mar. 2012 – Sept. 2012 2011 – 2012 May 2011 – July 2011 2009 – 2011
Road Transport and Highways	C.P. Joshi G.K. Vasan	2012–2014 2009 – 2012
Rural Development	Jairam Ramesh Vilasrao Deshmukh	2011–2014 2009 – 2011
Science and Technology	Jaipal Reddy Vayalar Ravi Vilasrao Deshmukh	2012–2014 2011 – 2012 2009 – 2011
Shipping	G.K. Vasan	2009–2014
Social Justice and Empowerment	Kumari Selja Mukul Wasnik	2012–2014 2009 – 2012
Textiles	Anand Sharma	2009–2014
Tourism	Chiranjeevi Kumari Selja	2012–2014 2009 – 2012
Tribal Affairs	V. Kishore Chandra Deo Kantilal Bhuria	2012–2014 2009 – 2012
Water Resources	Harish Rawat	2012–2014

=== United Progressive Alliance Cabinet by party ===
Source: Various news organisations
The new United Progressive Alliance (UPA) included 79 members, 78 members in the cabinet plus Prime Minister Manmohan Singh. The first 20 cabinet ministers including Manmohan Singh, swore in on 22 May 2009, while the other 59 cabinet members swore in on 27 May 2009. The 5 non-Congress cabinet ministers, include M.K. Azhagiri from the DMK. Mukul Roy from Trinamool Congress, Sharad Pawar from Nationalist Congress Party, and Farooq Abdullah from National Conference represent the other non-Congress cabinet ministers.

Party	Cabinet Ministers	Ministers of State	Total
Indian National Congress	27	32	59
Dravida Munnetra Kazhagam	1	4	5
Nationalist Congress Party	1	2	3
Jammu and Kashmir National Conference	1	0	1
Muslim League	0	1	1
Total	33	45	78

=== United Progressive Alliance cabinet by states ===
Source: The Hindu

State	Cabinet Ministers	Ministers of State (I)	Ministers of State	Total
Uttar Pradesh	2			
Maharashtra	5	2	2	9
Tamil Nadu	5	0	4	9
West Bengal	1	—	6	7
Kerala	2	0	4	6
Andhra Pradesh	3	0	4	7
Madhya Pradesh	—	—	—	4
Karnataka	3	0	1	4
Bihar	—	—	—	3
Himachal Pradesh	2	—	—	2
Meghalaya	—	—	—	2
Jharkhand	1	—	—	1
Uttarakhand	1	–	–	1

- MoS (I) – Ministers of State with Independent charge

== Subsequent vacancies and by-elections ==
The below list only covers seats whose vacancies were filled through by-elections. Conventionally, vacancies occurring with less than a year to go for the conclusion of the term, are generally left vacant for the remainder of the term. In the case of the 15th Lok Sabha, this means that by-elections would not have been held for vacancies post June 2013, with less than a year to go for the 2014 election. Only vacancies for which by-elections were held, i.e., occurring prior to May 2013, are mentioned here.

- A total of 19 by-elections across seats in 11 different states were held through the duration of the 15th Lok Sabha, with the first in November 2009 and the last in August 2013.
- 6 of these by-elections were necessitated by the death of the incumbent MP, and 13 due to resignation.
- Of the 13 resignations, 1 was for vacating a second seat, 6 for becoming Chief Ministers of different states, 1 for becoming President, 2 for becoming MLAs and 3 due to party defections.
- In May 2009, Firozabad fell vacant due to the resignation of Samajwadi Party MP Akhilesh Yadav as he preferred to retain Kannauj after winning two seats in the 2009 election. Raj Babbar of Indian National Congress won the seat in the by-election.
- In June 2010, Banka fell vacant due to the death of independent MP Digvijay Singh. His widow Putul Kumari won the seat as an independent in the by-election.
- In November 2010, Kadapa fell vacant due to the resignation of Congress MP Y. S. Jagan Mohan Reddy, who also resigned his party membership. He contested the seat again in the by-elections on a YSR Congress Party ticket and won.
- In February 2011, Jamshedpur fell vacant due to the resignation of Bharatiya Janata Party MP Arjun Munda, as he became Chief Minister of Jharkhand. Ajoy Kumar of Jharkhand Vikas Morcha (Prajatantrik) won the seat in the by-election.
- In March 2011, Bastar fell vacant due to the death of BJP MP Baliram Kashyap. His son Dinesh Kashyap of BJP won the seat in the by-election.
- In June 2011, Hisar fell vacant due to the death of Haryana Janhit Congress MP Bhajan Lal Bishnoi. His son Kuldeep Bishnoi of HJC won the seat in the by-election.
- In October 2011, Kolkata Dakshin fell vacant due to the resignation of All India Trinamool Congress MP Mamata Banerjee, as she became Chief Minister of West Bengal, after the 2011 West Bengal Legislative Assembly election. Subrata Bakshi of Trinamool Congress won the seat in the by-election.
- In November 2011, Udupi-Chikkamagaluru fell vacant due to the resignation of BJP MP D. V. Sadananda Gowda, as he became Chief Minister of Karnataka. K. Jayaprakash Hegde of Congress won the seat in the by-election.
- In February 2012, Nellore fell vacant due to the resignation of Congress MP Mekapati Rajamohan Reddy, who also resigned his party membership. He contested the seat again in the by-elections on a YSR Congress Party ticket and won.
- In May 2012, Kannauj fell vacant due to the resignation of SP MP Akhilesh Yadav, as he became Chief Minister of Uttar Pradesh, after the 2012 Uttar Pradesh Legislative Assembly election. His wife, Dimple Yadav of SP was elected unopposed from the seat in the by-elections.
- In July 2012, Jangipur fell vacant due to the resignation of Congress MP Pranab Mukherjee, who also resigned his party membership, as he became President of India, after his victory in the 2012 Indian presidential election. His son Abhijit Mukherjee of Congress won the seat in the by-election.
- In July 2012, Tehri Garhwal fell vacant due to the resignation of Congress MP Vijay Bahuguna, as he became Chief Minister of Uttarakhand, after the 2012 Uttarakhand Legislative Assembly election. Mala Rajya Laxmi Shah of BJP won the seat in the by-election.
- In January 2013, Mandi fell vacant due to the resignation of Congress MP Virbhadra Singh, as he became Chief Minister of Himachal Pradesh, after the 2012 Himachal Pradesh Legislative Assembly election. His wife Pratibha Singh of Congress won the seat in the by-election.
- In January 2013, Porbandar fell vacant due the resignation of Congress MP Vitthalbhai Radadiya, as he became an MLA in the Gujarat Legislative Assembly, after his victory from Dhoraji in the 2012 Gujarat Legislative Assembly election. However, he soon after resigned as MLA too, as well as his party membership. He contested the Lok Sabha seat again in the by-election on a BJP ticket and won.
- In January 2013, Maharajganj, Bihar fell vacant due to the death of Rashtriya Janata Dal MP Umashankar Singh. Prabhunath Singh of RJD won the seat in the by-election.
- In March 2013, Banaskantha fell vacant due to the death of Congress MP Mukesh Gadhvi. Haribhai Chaudhary of BJP won the seat in the by-election.
- In April 2013, Howrah fell vacant due to the death of Trinamool Congress MP Ambica Banerjee. Prasun Banerjee of Trinamool Congress, a retired football player-turned-politician, won the seat in the by-election.
- In May 2013, Mandya fell vacant due to the resignation of Janata Dal (Secular) MP N. Chaluvaraya Swamy, as he became an MLA in the Karnataka Legislative Assembly, after his victory from Nagamangala in the 2013 Karnataka Legislative Assembly election. Divya Spandana of Congress won the Lok Sabha seat in the by-election.
- In May 2013, Bengaluru Rural fell vacant due to the resignation of JDS MP H. D. Kumaraswamy, as he became an MLA in the Karnataka Legislative Assembly, after his victory from Ramanagara in the 2013 Karnataka Legislative Assembly election. D. K. Suresh of Congress won the Lok Sabha seat in the by-election.

State	Constituency	Name of elected M.P.	Party affiliation
Andhra Pradesh	Kadapa	Y. S. Jagan Mohan Reddy (resigned on 29 November 2010)	Indian National Congress
Andhra Pradesh	Kadapa	Y. S. Jagan Mohan Reddy (elected on 13 May 2011)	YSR Congress Party
Andhra Pradesh	Nellore	Mekapati Rajamohan Reddy (resigned on 28 February 2012)	Indian National Congress
Andhra Pradesh	Nellore	Mekapati Rajamohan Reddy (elected on 15 June 2012)	YSR Congress Party
Bihar	Maharajganj	Umashankar Singh (died on 24 January 2013)	Rashtriya Janata Dal
Bihar	Maharajganj	Prabhunath Singh (elected on 5 June 2013)	Rashtriya Janata Dal
Bihar	Banka	Digvijay Singh (died on 24 June 2010)	Independent politician
Bihar	Banka	Putul Kumari (elected on 24 November 2010)	Independent politician
Chhattisgarh	Bastar (ST)	Baliram Kashyap (died on 10 March 2011)	Bharatiya Janata Party
Chhattisgarh	Bastar (ST)	Dinesh Kashyap (elected on 13 May 2011)	Bharatiya Janata Party
Gujarat	Banaskantha	Mukesh Gadhvi (died on 1 March 2013)	Indian National Congress
Gujarat	Banaskantha	Haribhai Chaudhary (elected on 5 June 2013)	Bharatiya Janata Party
Gujarat	Porbandar	Vitthalbhai Radadiya (resigned on 3 January 2013)	Indian National Congress
Gujarat	Porbandar	Vitthalbhai Radadiya (elected on 5 June 2013)	Bharatiya Janata Party
Haryana	Hisar	Bhajan Lal Bishnoi (died on 3 June 2011)	Haryana Janhit Congress
Haryana	Hisar	Kuldeep Bishnoi (elected on 17 October 2011)	Haryana Janhit Congress
Himachal Pradesh	Mandi	Virbhadra Singh (resigned on 1 January 2013)	Indian National Congress
Himachal Pradesh	Mandi	Pratibha Singh (elected on 30 June 2013)	Indian National Congress
Jharkhand	Jamshedpur	Arjun Munda (resigned on 26 February 2011)	Bharatiya Janata Party
Jharkhand	Jamshedpur	Ajoy Kumar (elected on 4 July 2011)	Jharkhand Vikas Morcha
Karnataka	Udupi-Chikkamagaluru	D. V. Sadananda Gowda (resigned on 29 December 2011)	Bharatiya Janata Party
Karnataka	Udupi-Chikkamagaluru	K. Jayaprakash Hegde (elected on 21 March 2012)	Indian National Congress
Karnataka	Mandya	N. Chaluvaraya Swamy (resigned on 21 May 2013)	Janata Dal
Karnataka	Mandya	Divya Spandana (elected on 24 August 2013)	Indian National Congress
Karnataka	Bengaluru Rural	H. D. Kumaraswamy (resigned on 21 May 2013)	Janata Dal
Karnataka	Bengaluru Rural	D. K. Suresh (elected on 24 August 2013)	Indian National Congress
Uttar Pradesh	Firozabad	Akhilesh Yadav (resigned on 26 May 2009)	Samajwadi Party
Uttar Pradesh	Firozabad	Raj Babbar (elected on 10 November 2009)	Indian National Congress
Uttar Pradesh	Kannauj	Akhilesh Yadav (resigned on 2 May 2012)	Samajwadi Party
Uttar Pradesh	Kannauj	Dimple Yadav (elected on 9 June 2012)	Samajwadi Party
Uttarakhand	Tehri Garhwal	Vijay Bahuguna (resigned on 23 July 2012)	Indian National Congress
Uttarakhand	Tehri Garhwal	Mala Rajya Laxmi Shah (elected on 13 October 2012)	Bharatiya Janata Party
West Bengal	Jangipur	Pranab Mukherjee (resigned on 25 July 2012)	Indian National Congress
West Bengal	Jangipur	Abhijit Mukherjee (elected on 13 October 2012)	Indian National Congress
West Bengal	Kolkata Dakshin	Mamata Banerjee (resigned on 9 October 2011)	All India Trinamool Congress
West Bengal	Kolkata Dakshin	Subrata Bakshi (elected on 4 December 2011)	All India Trinamool Congress
West Bengal	Howrah	Ambica Banerjee (died on 25 April 2013)	All India Trinamool Congress
West Bengal	Howrah	Prasun Banerjee (elected on 5 June 2013)	All India Trinamool Congress
