= Lakhmu Bhawani =

Indian politician (1917–1988)

Member of Parliament, Lok Sabha
- In office 1962–1967
- Preceded by: Surti Kistaiya
- Succeeded by: Jhadoo Ram Sunder Lal
- Constituency: Bastar, Madhya Pradesh

Personal details
- Born: 3 April 1917
- Died: 26 September 1988 (aged 71) Bastar district, India
- Party: Independent
- Spouse: Somari Bai

Lakhmu Bhawani (3 April 1917 – 26 September 1988) was an Indian politician. He was elected to the Lok Sabha, the lower house of the Parliament of India from Bastar, Madhya Pradesh as an Independent.

Bhawani died in the Bastar district on 26 September 1988, at the age of 71.
