= Mahesh Kashyap =

Member of the Lok Sabha

Member of Parliament, Lok Sabha
- Incumbent
- Assumed office 4 June 2024
- Preceded by: Deepak Baij
- Constituency: Bastar

Personal details
- Born: Mahesh Kashyap; 1 October 1975 (age 50) Kumbraband Kalcha, Jagdalpur, Bastar, Chhattisgarh
- Party: Bharatiya Janta Party
- Spouse: Champa Kashyap
- Parent(s): Sukru Ram Kashyap, Sudhri
- Education: Matric
- Occupation: Politician

Mahesh Kashyap (born 1 October 1975) is an Indian politician. He was elected in 2024 to Lok Sabha from Bastar Lok Sabha constituency. He is a member of Bharatiya Janta Party.
