= Bhima Mandavi =

Indian politician (died 2019)

Member of Chhattisgarh Legislative Assembly
- In office 5 January 2019 – 9 April 2019
- Preceded by: Devati Karma
- Succeeded by: Devati Karma
- Constituency: Dantewada
- In office 2008–2013
- Preceded by: Mahendra Karma
- Succeeded by: Devati Karma
- Constituency: Dantewada

Personal details
- Died: 9 April 2019 Nakulnar, Chhattisgarh
- Party: Bharatiya Janata Party
- Spouse: Ojasvi Bhima Mandavi
- Parent: Linga Ram Mandavi
- Occupation: Politician

Bhima Mandavi (died April 9, 2019) was a Bharatiya Janata Party politician and member of the Chhattisgarh Legislative Assembly from Dantewada assembly constituency.

He was assassinated by naxalites belonging to the Communist Party of India (Maoist) in Nakulnar village of Dantewada district in the state of Chhattisgarh.
