= Marwahi Assembly constituency =

Legislative Assembly constituency in Chhattisgarh State, India

Coordinates: 23.01°N 82.05°E

Marwahi
- Constituency No. 24 for the Chhattisgarh Legislative Assembly

Constituency details
- Country: India
- Region: Central India
- State: Chhattisgarh
- District: Gaurela-Pendra-Marwahi
- Lok Sabha constituency: Korba
- Established: 2003
- Total electors: 197,952
- Reservation: ST

Member of Legislative Assembly
- 6th Chhattisgarh Legislative Assembly
- Incumbent Pranav Kumar Marpachi
- Party: Bharatiya Janata Party
- Elected year: 2023

Marwahi is one of the 90 Legislative Assembly constituencies of Chhattisgarh state in India. It is in Gaurela-Pendra-Marwahi district and is reserved for candidates belonging to the Scheduled Tribes. It is a segment of Korba Lok Sabha constituency.

== Members of Legislative Assembly ==
| Year | Candidate | Party |
|---|---|---|
| 2003 | Ajit Jogi | Indian National Congress |
| 2008 | Ajit Jogi | Indian National Congress |
| 2013 | Amit Jogi | Indian National Congress |
| 2018 | Ajit Jogi | Janta Congress Chhattisgarh |
| 2020^ | Dr. Krishna Kumar Dhruw | Indian National Congress |
| 2023 | Pranav Kumar Marpachi | Bharatiya Janata Party |

- ^ denotes by-election.

== Election results ==
=== 2023 ===
2023 Chhattisgarh Legislative Assembly election: Marwahi
| Party | Candidate | Votes | % | ±% |
|---|---|---|---|---|
| BJP | Pranav Kumar Marpachi | 51,960 | 33.35 | ▲2.90 |
| JCC | Gulab Raj | 39,882 | 25.60 | New |
| INC | Dr. Krishna Kumar Dhruw | 39,221 | 25.17 | ▼30.92 |
| GGP | Ritu Pandram | 10,188 | 6.54 | ▲1.26 |
| NOTA | None of the Above | 4,088 | 2.62 | ▼0.4 |
| Majority | | 12,078 | 7.75 | ▼23.4 |
| Turnout | | 1,55,795 | | |
| BJP gain from INC | | Swing | | |

=== 2020 by-election ===
A by-election was needed due to the death of the sitting MLA Ajit Jogi.

2020 by-election: Marwahi
| Party | Candidate | Votes | % | ±% |
|---|---|---|---|---|
| INC | Dr. Krishna Kumar Dhruw | 83,561 | 56.09 | ▲42.66 |
| BJP | Dr. Gambheer Singh | 45,364 | 30.45 | ▲11.96 |
| GGP | Ritu Pandram | 7,864 | 5.28 | ▼1.41 |
| NOTA | None of the Above | 3,787 | 2.54 | ▼0.48 |
| Majority | | 38,197 | 25.64 | ▼5.51 |
| Turnout | | 1,48,966 | | |
| INC gain from JCC | | Swing | | |

=== 2018 ===
Chhattisgarh Legislative Assembly Election, 2018: Marwahi
| Party | Candidate | Votes | % | ±% |
|---|---|---|---|---|
| JCC | Ajit Jogi | 74,041 | 49.64 | |
| BJP | Archana Porte | 27,579 | 18.49 | |
| INC | Gulab Raj | 20,040 | 13.43 | |
| GGP | Ritu Pandram | 9,978 | 6.69 | |
| NOTA | None of the Above | 4,501 | 3.02 | |
| Majority | | 46,462 | 31.15 | |
| Turnout | | 1,49,170 | 81.06 | |
| JCC gain from INC | | Swing | | |

== See also ==
- Gaurela-Pendra-Marwahi district
- Marwahi
- List of constituencies of Chhattisgarh Legislative Assembly
