= Bijapur Assembly constituency =

Legislative Assembly constituency in Chhattisgarh State, India

Coordinates: 18.8°N 80.81°E

Bijapur
- Constituency No. 89 for the Chhattisgarh Legislative Assembly

Constituency details
- Country: India
- Region: Central India
- State: Chhattisgarh
- District: Bijapur
- Lok Sabha constituency: Bastar
- Established: 2003
- Total electors: 169,457
- Reservation: ST

Member of Legislative Assembly
- 6th Chhattisgarh Legislative Assembly
- Incumbent Vikram Mandavi
- Party: Indian National Congress
- Elected year: 2023
- Preceded by: Mahesh Gagda

Bijapur is one of the 90 Legislative Assembly constituencies of Chhattisgarh state in India.

It is part of Bijapur district and is reserved for candidates belonging to the Scheduled Tribes.

== Members of the Legislative Assembly ==
Election	Name	Party
Madhya Pradesh Legislative Assembly
1952	Hira Shah	Indian National Congress
1957	B. R. Pambhoi	Indian National Congress
1962	Hira Shah	Indian National Congress
1967	D. S. K. Shah	Independent politician
1972	Kistaiya Papaiya	Indian National Congress
1977	Mahadev Ayatoo Ram	Janata Party
1980	Mahadeo Rana	Indian National Congress
1985	Shishu Pal Singh	Indian National Congress
1990	Rajendra Pambhoi	Indian National Congress
1993	Rajaram Todem	Bharatiya Janata Party
1998	Rajendra Pambhoi	Indian National Congress
Chhattisgarh Legislative Assembly
2003	Rajendra Pambhoi	Indian National Congress
2008	Mahesh Gagda	Bharatiya Janata Party
2013	Mahesh Gagda	Bharatiya Janata Party
2018	Vikram Mandavi	Indian National Congress
2023	Vikram Mandavi	Indian National Congress

== Election results ==
=== 2023 ===
2023 Chhattisgarh Legislative Assembly election: Bijapur
Party	Candidate	Votes	%	±%
INC	Vikram Mandavi	35,739	43.84	−12.08
BJP	Mahesh Gagda	33,033	40.52	+12.02
BSP	Ajay Kudiyam	1,968	2.41	
JCC	Ramdhar Jurri	1,964	2.41	−1.03
Hamar Raj Party	Ashok Talandi	1,872	2.3	
Independent	Jyoti Dhuruva	1,261	1.55	
CPI	Laxmi Narayan Portek	1,173	1.44	
Independent	Arjun Gote	877	1.08	
NOTA	None of the Above	3,628	4.45	−1.53
Majority		2,706	3.32	−24.10
Turnout		81,515	48.10	−0.80
INC hold		Swing		

=== 2018 ===
Chhattisgarh Legislative Assembly Election, 2018: Bijapur
Party	Candidate	Votes	%	±%
INC	Vikram Mandavi	44,011	55.92	
BJP	Mahesh Gagda	22,427	28.50	
JCC	Chandraiya Sakni	2,696	3.43	
Independent	Harish Pambhoi	2,004	2.55	
SP	Santosh Punem	999	1.27	
AAP	Tripat Yalam	942	1.20	
Independent	James Kudiyam	920	1.17	
NOTA	None of the Above	4,703	5.98	
Majority		21,584	27.42	
Turnout		77,986	48.90	
INC gain from BJP		Swing		

== See also ==
- List of constituencies of the Chhattisgarh Legislative Assembly
- Bijapur district, Chhattisgarh
