= Soyam Joga =

Indian politician

Soyam Joga was an Indian politician from the state of Madhya Pradesh. He represented Konta Vidhan Sabha constituency of undivided Madhya Pradesh Legislative Assembly by winning General election of 1957.
