= Rajendra Pambhoi =

Indian politician

Rajendra Pambhoi was the member of the Chhattisgarh Legislative Assembly from Bijapur Assembly constituency, from 2003 to 2008. He was a member of the Indian National Congress party. Before that he represented the same constituency in the Madhya Pradesh Legislative Assembly from 1998 to 2003. Rajendra Pambhoi died in 2011.
