= Konta Assembly constituency =

Legislative Assembly constituency in Chhattisgarh State, India

Coordinates: 17.81°N 81.38°E

Konta
- Constituency No. 90 for the Chhattisgarh Legislative Assembly

Constituency details
- Country: India
- Region: Central India
- State: Chhattisgarh
- District: Sukma
- Lok Sabha constituency: Bastar
- Established: 2003
- Total electors: 166,912
- Reservation: ST

Member of Legislative Assembly
- 6th Chhattisgarh Legislative Assembly
- Incumbent Kawasi Lakhma
- Party: Indian National Congress
- Elected year: 2023
- Preceded by: Manish Kunjam

Konta is one of the 90 Legislative Assembly constituencies of Chhattisgarh state in India.

It comprises Konta tehsil in Sukma district, and is reserved for candidates belonging to the Scheduled Tribes. As of 2023, its representative is Kawasi Lakhma of the Indian National Congress party.

== Members of the Legislative Assembly ==
Election	Name	Party
Madhya Pradesh Legislative Assembly
1952	Piloo	Independent politician
1956: Constituency renamed from Sukma to Konta
1957	Soyam Joga	Indian National Congress
1962	Bettijoga Hadma	Independent politician
1967	Dhansai	Indian National Congress
1972	Bettijoga Hadma	Bharatiya Jana Sangh
1977	Koram Gopal Kristaiya	Janata Party
1980	Jogiya Muka	Independent politician
1985	Madvi Handaram	Indian National Congress
1990	Manish Kumar	Communist Party of India
1993	Manish Kunjam	Communist Party of India
1998	Kawasi Lakhma	Indian National Congress
Chhattisgarh Legislative Assembly
2003	Kawasi Lakhma	Indian National Congress
2008	Kawasi Lakhma	Indian National Congress
2013	Kawasi Lakhma	Indian National Congress
2018	Kawasi Lakhma	Indian National Congress
2023	Kawasi Lakhma	Indian National Congress

== Election results ==
=== 2023 ===
2023 Chhattisgarh Legislative Assembly election: Konta
Party	Candidate	Votes	%	±%
INC	Kawasi Lakhma	32,776	31.24	−3.81
BJP	Soyam Muka	30,795	29.35	+1.67
CPI	Manish Kunjam	29,040	27.68	+0.74
Sarv Adi Dal	Channaram Markam	2,881	2.75	
Azad Janata Party	Jagdish Nag	1,812	1.73	
Independent	Beeda Sodi	1,455	1.39	
JCC	Devendra Telam	1,392	1.33	
NOTA	None of the Above	3,691	3.52	−1.38
Majority		1,981	1.89	−5.48
Turnout		104,920	62.86	+7.56

=== 2018 ===
2018 Chhattisgarh Legislative Assembly election: Dongargarh
Party	Candidate	Votes	%	±%
INC	Kawasi Lakhma	31,933	35.05	
BJP	Dhaniram Barse	25,224	27.68	
CPI	Manish Kunjam	24,549	26.94	
Chhattisgarh Swabhiman Manch	Vijay Sodi	1,660	1.82	
BSP	Budhram Kartami	1,660	1.82	
AAP	Ramdev Baghel	1,619	1.78	
NOTA	None of the Above	4,468	4.9	
Majority		6,709	7.37	
Turnout		91,104	55.3	

== See also ==
- List of constituencies of the Chhattisgarh Legislative Assembly
- Sukma district
