= Manku Ram Sodhi =

Indian politician (1934–2017)

Member of Parliament Lok Sabha
- In office 1984–1996
- Preceded by: Laxman Karma
- Succeeded by: Mahendra Karma
- Constituency: Bastar

Personal details
- Born: 1 August 1934 Vill. Sonabal, Bastar, British India (now Chhattisgarh, India)
- Died: 10 January 2017 (aged 82) Kondagaon, India
- Party: Indian National Congress

Manku Ram Sodhi (1 August 1934 – 10 January 2017) was an Indian politician from Madhya Pradesh who was a leader of Indian National Congress. He served as member of the Lok Sabha representing Bastar (Lok Sabha constituency). He was elected to 8th, 9th and 10th Lok Sabha. Sodhi died in the village of Kondagaon, on 10 January 2017, at the age of 82.
