= Pravir Chandra Bhanj Deo =

Oriya ruler

His Highness Pravir Chandra Bhanj Deo King of Bastar

Maharaja of Bastar
- In office 28 October 1936 – 25 March 1966
- Preceded by: Prafulla Kumari Devi (as queen)
- Succeeded by: Vijay Chandra Bhanj Deo (as titular king)

Member of the Madhya Pradesh Legislative Assembly
- In office 25 February 1957 – 19 February 1962 Serving with Derhaprasad
- Preceded by: Doomer; Vidyanath
- Succeeded by: Chaitu Mahra
- Constituency: Jagdalpur

Personal details
- Born: 25 June 1929 Jagdalpur, Bastar State, British India (present-day Jagdalpur, Chhattisgarh)
- Died: 25 March 1966 (aged 36) Jagdalpur Palace, Madhya Pradesh (present-day Chhattisgarh)
- Cause of death: Assassination by gunshot
- Spouse: Rajkumari Shubhraj Kumari of Patan (m. 1961-1966)
- Parent(s): Prafulla Kumari Devi; Chandra Bhanj Deo

Pravir Chandra Bhanj Deo, King of Bastar (5 June 1929 – 25 March 1966) was the 20th maharaja of Bastar State. He represented the Jagdalpur Assembly constituency in the undivided Madhya Pradesh Legislative Assembly following the general election of 1957. He served as the King of Bastar in 1936 until his assassination in 1966.

He was the last ruler of Bastar state, which was established by a branch of the Kakatiya dynasty. The Bastar region was part of greater Kalinga kingdom and an extension of Trikalinga. The Kakatiya dynasty adopted the "Dev" or "Deo" surname in line with other feudal kings of Odisha under the Gajapati Kingdom in the medieval period.

== Early life and education ==
Pravir was born on 25 June 1929 and was educated at Rajkumar College, Raipur.

== Personal life ==
He was married to Rajkumari Shubhraj Kumari of Patan, Rajasthan, daughter of Raj Rishi Rao Saheb Udaya Singhji and Rani Trilokya Raj Lakshmi of Patan, on 4 July 1961.

== As King of Bastar ==
He succeeded to the throne on 28 October 1936. He was immensely popular among his people, as he took up the cause of the local tribal people, and provided political leadership against exploitation of natural resources of the region and corruption in land reforms.

== Death ==
On 25 March 1966, Pravir was gunned down, along with many of his tribal followers, when police opened fire on the King and a group of supporters at his palace in Jagdalpur. The official death toll was twelve, including the king, with twenty wounded; the police had fired sixty one rounds. The district magistrate was reported as stating that Pravir Chandra was leading armed adivasis against the police, who fired in self-defence. The killing of the Raja and other innocent tribals led to widespread rage among the local tribals of Bastar against the Indian government. This rage eventually became a significant reason of spreading of Naxalism in Chhattisgarh.

== See also ==
- Bastar state
- Kakatiya dynasty
