= Bastar Assembly constituency =

Legislative Assembly constituency in Chhattisgarh State, India

Coordinates: 19.29°N 82.1°E

Bastar
- Constituency No. 85 for the Chhattisgarh Legislative Assembly

Constituency details
- Country: India
- Region: Central India
- State: Chhattisgarh
- Division: Bastar
- District: Bastar
- Lok Sabha constituency: Bastar
- Established: 2008
- Total electors: 167,919
- Reservation: ST

Member of Legislative Assembly
- 6th Chhattisgarh Legislative Assembly
- Incumbent Lakheshwar Baghel
- Party: INC
- Alliance: INDIA
- Elected year: 2018
- Preceded by: Subhau Kashyap

Bastar is one of the 90 constituencies of the Chhattisgarh Legislative Assembly in India.

It is part of Bastar district and is reserved for candidates belonging to the Scheduled Tribes.

== Members of the Legislative Assembly ==
| Year | Member | Party |
|---|---|---|
Until 2008: Constituency did not exist
| 2008 | Subhau Kashyap | Bharatiya Janata Party |
| 2013 | Lakheshwar Baghel | Indian National Congress |
| 2018 | Lakheshwar Baghel | Indian National Congress |
| 2023 | Lakheshwar Baghel | Indian National Congress |

== Election results ==
=== 2023 ===
2023 Chhattisgarh Legislative Assembly election: Bastar
| Party | Candidate | Votes | % | ±% |
|---|---|---|---|---|
| INC | Lakheshwar Baghel | 68,401 | 47.92 | −10.09 |
| BJP | Maniram Kashyap | 61,967 | 43.41 | +11.50 |
| AAP | Jagmohan Baghel | 2,551 | 1.79 | +0.14 |
| JCC | Sonsay Kashyap | 1,933 | 1.35 | −1.53 |
| BSP | Ramdhar Baghel | 1,751 | 1.23 | |
| Hamar Raj Party | Lakheshwar Kashyap | 1,379 | 0.97 | New |
| NOTA | None of the Above | 2,738 | 1.92 | −2.04 |
| Majority | | 6,434 | 4.51 | −22.67 |
| Turnout | | 142,742 | 85.01 | +0.98 |
| INC hold | | Swing | | |

=== 2018 ===
2018 Chhattisgarh Legislative Assembly election: Bastar
| Party | Candidate | Votes | % | ±% |
|---|---|---|---|---|
| INC | Lakheshwar Baghel | 74,378 | 58.01 | +7.42 |
| BJP | Subhau Kashyap | 40,907 | 31.91 | −1.94 |
| JCC | Sonsay Kashyap | 3,688 | 2.88 | New |
| AAP | Jagmohan Baghel | 2,121 | 1.65 | New |
| Independent | Dulab Suryavanshi | 2,034 | 1.59 | |
| NOTA | None of the Above | 5,083 | 3.96 | −0.87 |
| Majority | | 33,471 | 27.18 | +10.44 |
| Turnout | | 1,29,232 | 84.03 | −0.25 |
| INC hold | | Swing | | |

=== 2013 ===
Chhattisgarh Legislative Assembly Election, 2013: Bastar
| Party | Candidate | Votes | % | ±% |
|---|---|---|---|---|
| INC | Lakheshwar Baghel | 57,942 | 50.59 | |
| BJP | Subhau Kashyap | 38,774 | 33.85 | |
| CPI | Mansingh Kashyap | 3,360 | 2.93 | |
| BSP | Jagmohan Baghel | 2,852 | 2.49 | |
| Independent | Damru Mourya | 2,419 | 2.11 | |
| Bharatiya Dalit Congress | Baldev Manjhi | 2,233 | 1.95 | |
| SP | Madhu Mourya | 1,426 | 1.25 | |
| NOTA | None of the Above | 5,529 | 4.83 | |
| Majority | | 19,168 | 16.74 | |
| Turnout | | 1,14,535 | 84.28 | |
| INC gain from BJP | | Swing | | |

=== 2008 ===
Chhattisgarh Legislative Assembly Election, 2008: Bastar
| Party | Candidate | Votes | % | ±% |
|---|---|---|---|---|
| BJP | Subhau Kashyap | 39,991 | 41.17 | |
| INC | Lakheshwar Baghel | 38,790 | 39.94 | |
| Independent | Madhu Mourya | 6,040 | 6.22 | |
| BSP | Kunti Kashyap | 4,550 | 4.68 | |
| CPI | Mansingh Kashyap | 2,844 | 2.93 | |
| Gondwana Mukti Sena | Narendra Kashyap | 2,722 | 2.80 | |
| Independent | Damrudhar Kashyap | 2,192 | 2.26 | |
| Majority | | | | |
| Turnout | | 97,129 | 74.79 | |
| BJP win (new seat) | | | | |

== See also ==
- List of constituencies of the Chhattisgarh Legislative Assembly
- Bastar district
