= Laxman Karma =

Indian politician

Member of Parliament, Lok Sabha
- In office 1980-1984
- Preceded by: Drig Pal Shah
- Succeeded by: Manku Ram Sodhi
- Constituency: Bastar, Madhya Pradesh

Member of Madhya Pradesh Legislative Assembly
- In office (1985–1990)
- Preceded by: Mahendra Karma
- Succeeded by: Barsa Dularam
- Constituency: Dantewada
- In office (1972–1977)
- Preceded by: R. Boti
- Succeeded by: Sukuldhar Bhawani
- Constituency: Dantewada

Personal details
- Born: 5 March 1944 (age 82) Pharspal Village, Baster district, British India (now Chhattisgarh)
- Party: Indian National Congress
- Spouse: Seeta Karma

Laxman Tula Ram Karma is an Indian politician. He was elected to the Lok Sabha, the lower house of the Parliament of India from Bastar, Madhya Pradesh as a member of the Indian National Congress.
