= Mohan Markam =

Indian politician

President of Chhattisgarh Pradesh Congress Committee
- In office 28 June 2019 – 12 July 2023
- Preceded by: Bhupesh Baghel
- Succeeded by: Deepak Baij

Member of Chhattisgarh Legislative Assembly
- In office 8 December 2013 – 3 December 2023
- Preceded by: Lata Usendi
- Succeeded by: Lata Usendi
- Constituency: Kondagaon

Personal details
- Born: 15 September 1967 (age 58) Tendugaon, Chhattisgarh, India
- Party: Indian National Congress

Mohan Markam (born September 15, 1967) is an Indian politician from Chhattisgarh, India. He was the President of Chhattisgarh Pradesh Congress Committee from June 2019 to July 2023. He was a MLA from Kondagaon constituency of Chhattisgarh.
