= Prafulla Kumari Devi =

Prafulla Kumari Devi I of Bastar

Queen of Bastar
- Reign: 1922 - 1936
- Predecessor: Raja Rudra Pratap Deo
- Successor: Pravir Chandra Bhanj Deo
- Born: 10 February 1910
- Died: 28 February 1936 (aged 26); London, England
- Spouse: Prince Chandra Bhanj Deo of Mayurbhanj
- Issue: Princess Kamla Devi; Pravir Chandra Bhanj Deo; Princess Geeta Kumari Devi; Vijay Chandra Bhanj Deo
- Father: Raja Rudra Pratap Deo
- Religion: Hindusim

Rani Profulla Kumari Devi of Bastar (1910 – 28 Feb 1936) was the Rani regnant (queen regnant) of the Indian Princely Bastar State between 1922 and 1936.

Her father Raja Rudra Pratap Deo died on 16 November 1921 and she succeeded her father on 23 November 1922.

She succeeded Rudra Pratap Deo on 23 November 1922. She ruled for fourteen years.

She married Prince Prafulla Chandra Bhanj Deo of Mayurbhanj.

She was succeeded by Pravir Chandra Bhanj Deo.
