= All India Adivasi Mahasabha =

Tribal wing of the Communist Party of India

All India Adivasi Mahasabha is the tribal wing of the Communist Party of India. Manish Kunjam is the current president of the organization.
