= Muchaki Kosa =

Indian politician

Member of Parliament, Lok Sabha
- In office 1952-1957
- Succeeded by: Surti Kistaiya
- Constituency: Bastar, Madhya Pradesh

Personal details
- Party: Independent

Muchaki Kosa is an Indian politician. He was elected to the Lok Sabha, the lower house of the Parliament of India from Bastar, Madhya Pradesh as an Independent.
