= Kawasi Lakhma =

Indian politician

Minister of Commercial Tax (excise) Minister of Commerce and Industry Government of Chhattisgarh
- In office 2018–2023
- Chief Minister: Bhupesh Baghel
- Succeeded by: O. P. Choudhary (Commercial Tax); Lakhan Lal Dewangan (Commerce and Industry)

Member of the Legislative Assembly, Chhattisgarh
- In office 1998–present
- Preceded by: Manish Kunjam
- Constituency: Konta

Personal details
- Party: Indian National Congress

Kawasi Lakhma is a former cabinet minister of Chhattisgarh, India. He was also elected as a Member of the Legislative Assembly (MLA) five times consecutively from Konta. He was one of the survivors of 2013 Naxal attack in Darbha valley.

== Early life ==
Kawasi Lakhma is from Nagaras village, Sonakukanur post, Konta Tehsil, Sukma district, Chhattisgarh and his place is a part of Bastar region.

== Political life ==
Kawasi Lakhma, a tribal leader, was elected as MLA (elected in 2008) from Konta constituency of Chhattisgarh state and he was earlier elected in 2003 with a huge margin (securing 51.54% of votes polled). His constituency is a Naxal hit area and he is capable of interacting with Naxals in their native language. During 2013 Naxal attack in Darbha Valley, more than 30 people were killed and two other leaders travelling in the same car were taken away and killed by Naxals, sparing Lakhma. As an opposition party MLA, he has raised concerns about the quality of developmental activities undertaken in the Naxal hit Sukma district. He is cabinet minister of Commercial Tax (Excise), Commerce and Industry in government of Chhattisgarh.

=== After Naxal attack ===
His name was widely discussed as some of his party men expressed doubt about his integrity and questioned his role in the Naxal attack, when other Congress leaders were shot dead in the attack, Kawasi Lakhma was spared and caused doubts.

Bharatiya Janata Party has demanded a narco test on Kawasi Lakhma, so that the details of dialogue he exchanged with Naxals during the deadly attack and any possible conspiracy, can be found out. He won the election and became the minister of the state.
