= Chaitram Atami =

Indian politician

Member of Chhattisgarh Legislative Assembly
- Incumbent
- Assumed office 2023
- Preceded by: Devati Karma
- Constituency: Dantewada

Personal details
- Born: 1976 (age 49–50) Dantewada, Chhattisgarh, India
- Party: Bharatiya Janata Party
- Parent: Bosa Atami (father)
- Education: Chhattisgarh State Open School, Raipur (Class 12)
- Profession: Politician
- Known for: Association with Salwa Judum, anti-Naxalite activities

Chaitram Atami (born 1976) is an Indian politician from Chhattisgarh. He is an MLA from Dantewada Assembly constituency, which is a reserved constituency for Scheduled Tribes community, in Dantewada district. He won the 2023 Chhattisgarh Legislative Assembly election, representing the Bharatiya Janata Party.

== Early life and education ==
Atami is from Dantewada, Chhattisgarh. His father, Bosa Atami, is a farmer. He passed Class 12 through open school stream in 2013 at Chhattisgarh State Open School, Raipur.

== Career ==
Atami won from Dantewada Assembly constituency representing the Bharatiya Janata Party in the 2023 Chhattisgarh Legislative Assembly election. He polled 57,739 votes and defeated his nearest rival, K. Chavindra Mahendra Karma of the Indian National Congress, by a margin of 16,803 votes.

He was part of the Salwa Judum, an armed anti insurgency militia created by the local leaders as a resistance force against the Naxalites in the affected Bastar region. After the Supreme Court of India declared Salwa Judum (Peace March) as unconstitutional, many of these leaders joined political parties. Atami too joined BJP.
