= Lambodar Baliar =

Indian politician

Member of Parliament, Lok Sabha
- In office 1967-1971
- Preceded by: Jhadoo Ram Sunder Lal
- Succeeded by: D. P. Shah
- Constituency: Bastar, Madhya Pradesh

Personal details
- Party: Independent
- Spouse: Savitri

Lambodar Baliar is an Indian politician. He was elected to the Lok Sabha, the lower house of the Parliament of India from Bastar, Madhya Pradesh as an Independent.
