= Darbha, Chhattisgarh =

Darbha
- town
- Location within Chhattisgarh Location within India
- Coordinates: 18°52′0″N 81°52′0″E
- Country: India
- State: Chhattisgarh
- District: Bastar
- Elevation: 678 m (2,224 ft)

Languages
  - Official: Hindi, Chhattisgarhi
- Time zone: UTC+5:30 (IST)
- Vehicle registration: CG

Darbha is a town in Bastar district, Chhattisgarh, India.

== Geography ==
It is located at 18°52′0″N 81°55′0″E at an elevation of 678 m above MSL.

== Location ==
Darbha is connected to Jagdalpur by National Highway 30. Nearest airport is Raipur Airport.

== Places of interest ==
- Indravati National Park
- Kanger Ghati National Park
- Chitrakot Waterfalls
