= Lata Usendi =

Indian politician

Member of Chhattisgarh Legislative Assembly
- Incumbent
- Assumed office 3 December 2023
- Preceded by: Mohan Markam
- Constituency: Kondagaon
- In office 2003 – 8 December 2013
- Preceded by: Shankar Sodi
- Succeeded by: Mohan Markam
- Constituency: Kondagaon

Vice President of the Bharatiya Janata Party
- Incumbent
- Assumed office 29 July 2023
- President: J.P. Nadda

Minister of Women And Child Development, Minister of Social Welfare, Minister of Sports & Youth Affairs Government of Chhattisgarh
- In office 22 December 2008 – 12 December 2013
- Chief Minister: Raman Singh
- Preceded by: Renuka Singh
- Succeeded by: Ramshila Sahu

Personal details
- Born: Lata Usendi; 1 May 1974 (age 52) Kondagaon, Chhattisgarh
- Party: Bharatiya Janata Party
- Parent: Late Mangalram Usendi (father)
- Education: B.A.
- Occupation: Agriculture, Politician

Lata Usendi (born 1 May 1974) is an Indian politician who was Women and Child Development Minister of Chhattisgarh. She is Vice President of Bharatiya Janata Party. She was Chairwoman of Woman’s Commission and State Supplies Corporation Chhattisgarh.

She is currently a member in state assembly from Kondagaon. and serving as Vice President of Bastar Pradhikaran

== Political career ==
Lata Usendi started her politics as a BJP divisional minister and became a councillor. After being elected as MLA for the first time in 2003, she became a minister. In 2008 also she won the election and became a minister. But lost the elections in 2013 and 2018. Lata Usendi had been Kanker BJP Mandal Minister in 1998. In 1999, she was elected councilor from the hospital ward of Kondagaon Municipal Council. In 2000, she became the district president of BJP Mahila Morcha in Kanker district. In 2002, she became the district president of Kondagaon BJP Mahila Morcha. In 2003, she was elected MLA for the first time by contesting elections from Kondagaon Assembly on BJP ticket. In 2004, she became the National Vice President of Bharatiya Janata Yuva Morcha. She was also the General Secretary of District BJP Mahila Morcha Bastar. In 2004, he was the Chairman of the Committee on Welfare of Women and Children of the Thirty-sixth Legislative Assembly. Apart from this, he was a member of the committee related to the welfare of Scheduled Castes, Scheduled Tribes and Backward Classes.
