= Amit Jogi =

American-born Indian politician

Member of the Chhattisgarh Legislative Assembly
- In office 2013–2018
- Constituency: Marwahi

Personal details
- Born: 7 August 1977 (age 49) Dallas, Texas, U.S.
- Party: Janta Congress Chhattisgarh
- Spouse: Richa Jogi
- Parent(s): Ajit Jogi (father); Dr. Renu Jogi (mother)

Amit Jogi (born 7 August 1977) is an American-born Indian politician.

== Early life ==
Jogi is the son of former Chief Minister of Chhattisgarh Ajit Jogi. He was supposedly an American citizen by birth, and became an Indian citizen in July 2004 or 2002. His date and place of birth are unclear because he provided documents with contradictory information. However, at a later point, he stated his date of birth to be 7 August 1977, and his place of birth to be Dallas, United States. "I can't help where I was born... I was born in Dallas, USA, in 1977 and I was nationalized by LK Advani in 2002.

Jogi is a 1998 graduate of St. Stephen's College, Delhi, has an MA in Politics and International Studies, from Jawaharlal Nehru University, Delhi, and an LLB from Pandit Ravishankar Shukla University, Raipur (2009).

== Career ==
He became a Member of the Legislative Assembly (MLA) representing Marwahi (Vidhan Sabha Constituency, Chhattisgarh) in 2013 Assembly Elections. He defeated the Bharatiya Janata Party candidate by the highest margin in the state: 46,250 votes.

He was said to have been involved in an operation of bribing Dilip Singh Judeo in 2003. This is per the statement given by Central Bureau of Investigation in Supreme Court of India in 2005

On 23 July 2011, Amit Jogi was attacked by a mob while campaigning for Tanya Solomon, the Indian National Congress (INC) candidate for the Jabera (Vidhan Sabha constituency) by-poll in Madhya Pradesh. Solomon is the daughter of the late Ratnesh Solomon who was a five-time MLA from the Jabera constituency, and Ajit Jogi's brother-in-law.

The INC expelled Jogi on 7 January 2017, for six years for indulging in anti-party activities. Jogi later said he would challenge his expulsion as the party is not anybody's bapoti (personal property).

On 2 March 2017, the Chhattisgarh Legislative Assembly passed a censure motion against Jogi for "unparliamentary" behaviour.

== Chhattisgarh Janata Congress ==
Chhattisgarh Janata Congress was founded by Ajit Jogi, after Jogi and his son Amit were expelled from INC for anti-party activities and for sabotaging Antagarh by-poll elections. Amit was expelled for six years.

Ajit Jogi launched a party in Thathapur village of Kawardha district and directly challenged Chhattisgarh Chief Minister Raman Singh.
