= Manish Kunjam =

Indian politician

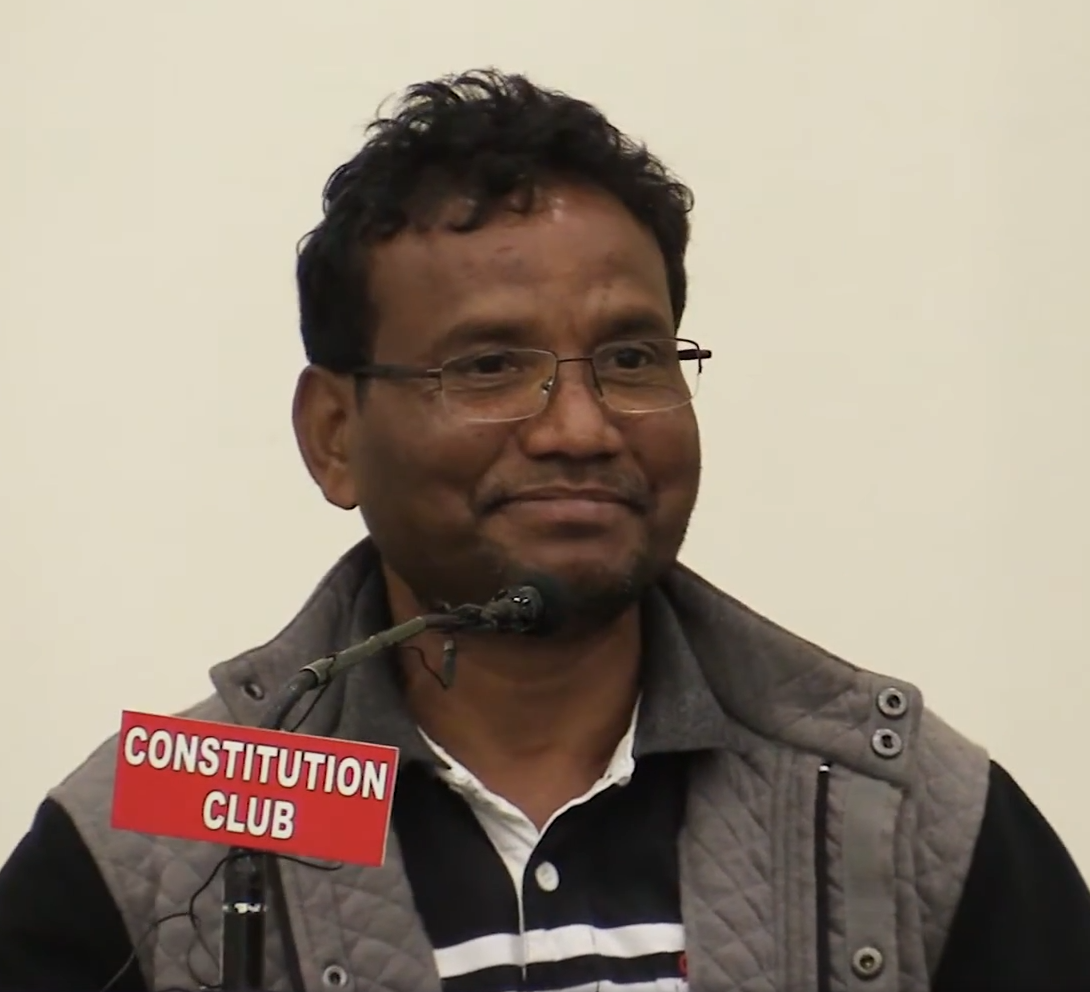

Member of Madhya Pradesh Legislative Assembly
- In office 1993–1998
- Preceded by: Manish Kumar
- Succeeded by: Kawasi Lakhma
- Constituency: Konta

Manish Kunjam is an Indian communist politician from Chhattisgarh and leader of the Communist Party of India. He represented Konta constituency in the Madhya Pradesh Legislative Assembly (Now in Chhattisgarh) from 1990 to 1998. He is a member of the National Executive of Communist Party of India. Also he is the president of All India Adivasi Mahasabha. Tribals in Chhattisgarh's Bastar region have launched a massive protest against a proposed Tata steel plant, alleging the administration and the company were forcing them to give up their land. Tribals protest against Tata steel plant. Manish kunjam played a prominent role.
