= Vikram Mandavi =

Indian politician

Member of Chhattisgarh Legislative Assembly
- Incumbent
- Assumed office 2018
- Preceded by: Mahesh Gagda
- Constituency: Bijapur

Personal details
- Party: Indian National Congress
- Profession: Politician

Vikram Mandavi (born 1977) is an Indian politician from Chhattisgarh. He is an MLA from Bijapur Assembly constituency, which is reserved for Scheduled Tribes community, in Bijapur district. He won the 2023 Chhattisgarh Legislative Assembly election, representing the Indian National Congress.

== Early life and education ==
Mandavi is from Bijapur, Chhattisgarh. He is the son of Bheem Shah Mandavi. He passed Class 12 in 1996 at Government Higher Secondary School, Bhairamgarh. Later, he discontinued his studies. He also served as a Panchayat member.

== Career ==
Mandavi won from Bijapur Assembly constituency representing the Indian National Congress in the 2023 Chhattisgarh Legislative Assembly election. He polled 35,739 votes and defeated his nearest rival, Mahesh Gagda of the Bharatiya Janata Party, by a margin of 2,706 votes. He first became an MLA winning the 2018 Chhattisgarh Legislative Assembly election defeating Gagda by 21,584 votes.

In April 2023, he narrowly escaped an attack by maoists near Padeda village in Bastar region.
