= Dantewara Assembly constituency =

Legislative Assembly constituency in Chhattisgarh State, India

Coordinates: 18.9°N 81.35°E

Dantewara
- Constituency No. 88 for the Chhattisgarh Legislative Assembly

Constituency details
- Country: India
- Region: Central India
- State: Chhattisgarh
- Division: Bastar
- District: Dantewada
- Lok Sabha constituency: Bastar
- Established: 1951
- Total electors: 192,806
- Reservation: ST

Member of Legislative Assembly
- 6th Chhattisgarh Legislative Assembly
- Incumbent Chaitram Atarmi
- Party: BJP
- Alliance: NDA
- Elected year: 2023
- Preceded by: Devati Karma

Dantewara (also known as Dantewada) is one of the 90 Legislative Assembly constituencies of Chhattisgarh state in India.

It is part of Dantewada district and is reserved for candidates belonging to the Scheduled Tribes.

== Members of the Legislative Assembly ==
Election	Name	Party
Madhya Pradesh Legislative Assembly
1952	Boda Manjhi (Note: No Reservation in 1952)	Independent
1957	Sheoram	Indian National Congress
1962	Lachhu	Independent
1967	R. Boti	Independent
1972	Laxman Karma	Indian National Congress
1977	Sukuldhar Bhawani	Janata Party
1980	Mahendra Karma	Communist Party of India
1985	Laxman Karma	Indian National Congress
1990	Barsa Dularam	Communist Party of India
1993	Nandaram Sori	Communist Party of India
1998	Mahendra Karma	Indian National Congress
Chhattisgarh Legislative Assembly
2003	Mahendra Karma	Indian National Congress
2008	Bhima Mandavi	Bharatiya Janata Party
2013	Devati Mahendra Karma	Indian National Congress
2018	Bhima Mandavi	Bharatiya Janata Party
2019^ (Note: by-poll)	Devati Mahendra Karma	Indian National Congress
2023	Chaitram Atami	Bharatiya Janata Party

== Election results ==
=== 2023 ===
2023 Chhattisgarh Legislative Assembly election: Dantewada
Party	Candidate	Votes	%	±%
BJP	Chaitram Atami	57,739	42.92	+9.04
INC	Chhavindra Mahendra Karma	40,936	30.43	−13.21
CPI	Bhimsen Mandavi	9,217	6.85	+0.17
AAP	Balloo Ram Bhawani	7,202	5.35	
BSP	Keshav Netam	5,427	4.03	
Independent	Amulkar Nag	3,248	2.41	
JCC	Bela Telam	2,143	1.59	
NOTA	None of the Above	8,620	6.41	+1.37
Majority		16,803	12.49	+2.73
Turnout		134,532	69.78	+9.13
BJP gain from INC		Swing		

=== 2019 ===
Bye-Election, 2019: Dantewara
Party	Candidate	Votes	%	±%
INC	Devati Mahendra Karma	50,028	43.64	▲10.22
BJP	Ojasvi Bhima Mandavi	38,836	33.88	▲2.37
CPI	Bhimsen Mandavi	7,664	6.68	▼4.05
NOTA	None of the Above	5,779	5.04	▼3.70
Majority		11,192	9.76	▲7.85
Turnout		1,14,617	60.65	▲0.01
INC gain from BJP		Swing		

=== 2018 ===
2018 Chhattisgarh Legislative Assembly election: Dantewara
Party	Candidate	Votes	%	±%
BJP	Bhima Mandavi	37,990	33.42	
INC	Devati Mahendra Karma	35,818	31.51	
CPI	Nanda Ram Sori	12,195	10.73	
BSP	Keshav Netam	6,119	5.38	
AAP	Baloo Ram Bhawani	4,903	4.31	
Independent	Jaya Kashyap	3,555	3.13	
Bhartiya Panchyat Party	Sudhru Ram Kunjam	3,154	2.77	
NOTA	None of the Above	9,929	8.74	
Majority		2,172	1.91	
Turnout		113,599	60.64	
BJP gain from INC		Swing		

== See also ==
- List of constituencies of the Chhattisgarh Legislative Assembly
- Dantewada district
