= Bastar State =

Princely state in India (1324–1948)

Coordinates: 20.083°N 83.2°E

- Princely State of British India
- 1324–1948
- Flag

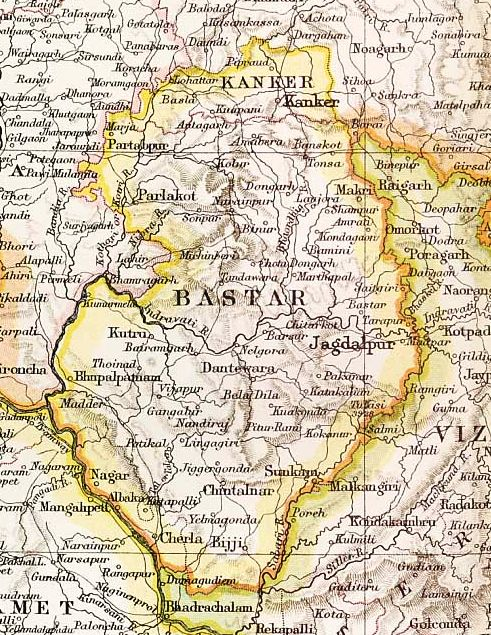
- Bastar State in the Imperial Gazetteer of India
- Capital: Jagdalpur
- Area
  - 1901: 33,831 km^{2} (13,062 sq mi)
- Population
  - 1901: 306,501
- History
  - Established: 1324
  - Accession to the Union of India: 1948
Succeeded by
India
- Bastar Princely State

Bastar state was a princely state in India during the British Raj. It was founded in the early 14th century by Annamaraja, a brother of the last ruler of the Kakatiya dynasty, Prataparudra II.

It is today used to refer to the same region, called Bastar division in Chhattisgarh state.

In the early 19th century, the state became part of Central Provinces and Berar under the British Raj, and acceded to the Union of India on 1 January 1948, to become part of Madhya Pradesh in 1956, and of the Bastar district of Chhattisgarh state in 2000. The current ceremonial ruler is Kamal Chandra Bhanj Deo, of the Kakatiya and Bhanj dynasty.

== Overview ==
Bastar state was situated in the south-eastern corner of the Central Provinces and Berar, bounded to the north by the Kanker State, south by the Godavari district of Madras States Agency, west by Chanda District, Hyderabad State, and the Godavari River, and east by the Jeypore Estate in Odisha.

It had an area of 13,062 square miles (33,830 km^{2}) and a population of 306,501 in 1901, when its capital city at Jagdalpur, situated on the banks of Indravati River, had a population of 4,762.

== History ==
Traditionally the area is mentioned as Dandakaranya in the epic Ramayana, and part of the Kosala Kingdom in the Mahabharata. Around 450 AD, the Bastar area was ruled by a Nala king called Bhavadatta Varman, who is recorded as having invaded the neighbouring Vakataka kingdom during the reign of its king, Narendrasena (440–460)

A brother of Prataparudra II, Annamaraja, has been associated with ruling what eventually became the state of Bastar. This appears likely to be historical revisionism, dating from a genealogy published by the ruling family in 1703, because the document records only eight generations spanning almost four centuries of rule. Such revisionism and tenuous claims of connection to the Kakatiyas was not uncommon because it was perceived as legitimising the right to rule and a warrior status. Talbot notes that there is a record of a brother called Annamadeva and that:

He is said to have left Warangal for the northeast after anointing Prataparudra's son as king. Thus, the founder of the family fortunes in Bastar may very well have been a Telugu warrior from Telangana who was familiar with the prevalent legends about the Kakatiyas.

According to this chronology, the state was established around 1324 CE and the founder established his kingdom at Bastar under the tutelage of a local goddess, Danteshwari. That goddess remains the tutelary deity of Bastar region and the Danteshwari Temple stands today at Dantewada. He ruled till 1369 when he was followed successively by Hamir Deva (r. 1369–1410), Bhaitai Deva (1410–1468), Purushottama Deva (1468–1534), Pratapa Raja Deva (1602–1625) and Dikpala Deva (1680–1709), after which the Bastar branch of the dynasty became extinct in the third generation with him, after which a descendant of the younger brother of Prataparaja Deva, Rajapala Deva became the next King in 1709. Rajapala Deva had two wives, first a Baghela princess, married, who had a son, Dakhin Singh, secondly, a Chandela Princess, who has two sons, Dalapati Deva and Pratap, trouble however struck again when after the death of Rajapala Deva in 1721, the elder queen ousted other claimants and placed her brother on the throne of Bastar, Dalapati Deva took refuge in the neighbouring kingdom of Jeypore and finally regained his throne a decade later in 1731.

Its capital was Jagdalpur, where Bastar royal palace built by its ruler, when its capital was shifted here from old capital Bastar.

Later at some point in the 15th century Bastar was divided into two kingdoms, one based in Kanker and the other ruled from Bastar. The present Halba Tribe claims to descend from the military class of these kingdoms.

Until the rise of the Marathas, the state remained fairly independent until the 18th century. In 1861, Bastar became part of the newly formed Central Provinces and Berar, and in 1863, after years of feud, over the Kotapad region, it was given over to the neighbouring Jeypore state in 1863, on the condition of payment of tribute of Rs. 3,000, two-thirds of which sum was remitted from the amount payable by Bastar. By virtue of this arrangement the tribute of Bastar was, reduced to a nominal amount.

Pravir Chandra Bhanj Deo (1929–1966), the 20th and the last ruling head of the Bastar state, ascended the throne in 1936, before it acceded to India in 1948 during the political integration of India.

Pravir was immensely popular among the tribals. He was shot dead in a "police action" on 25 March 1966 while leading a tribal movement against encroachment of land by outsider in concert with the authorities in Bastar. He was executed on the steps of his own Palace in Jagdalpur. Scores of other tribals and courtiers too were murdered by the police.

== Rulers ==
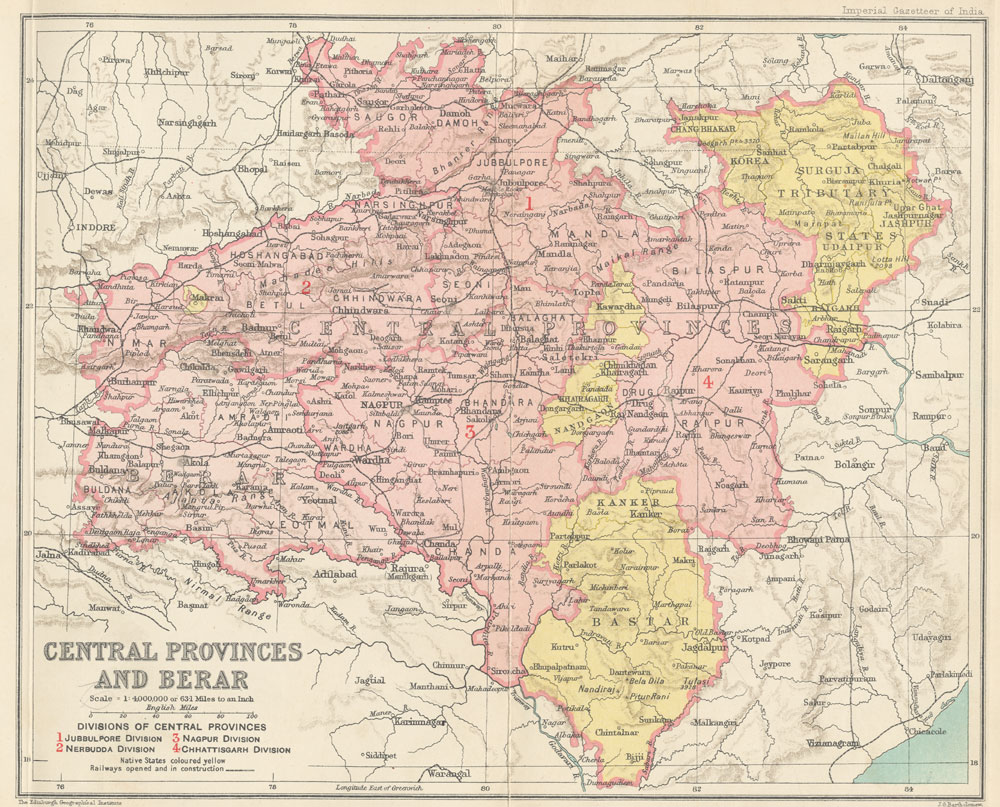
Map of the Central Provinces and Berar in 1909 showing the districts, divisions, and Bastar princely state under the authority of the province, as well as the 1905 changes to the eastern boundary.

- Raja Annam Dev (1313 – 1358) - brother of the Kakatiya dynasty of Warangal, Raja Prataparudra Deva
- Raja Hamir Deo (1358 - 1379)
- Raja Bhiraj Deo (1379 - 1408)
- Raja Purushotam Deo (1408 - 1439)
- Raja Jay Singh Deo (1439 - 1457)
- Raja Narsingh Deo (1457 - 1501)
- Raja Pratapraj Deo (1501 - 1524)
- Raja Jagdeesh rai Deo (1524 - 1538)
- Raja Veer Narayan Deo (1538 - 1553)
- Raja veer Singh Deo (1553 - 1590)
- Raja Durgpal Deo (1590 – 1649)
- Raja Rakshpal Deo (1649 – 1716)
- Raja Dalpat Deo (1716 – 1775)
- Raja Dariyao Deo (1775 – 1800)
- Raja Mahipal Deo (1800 - 1842)
- Raja Bhupal Deo (1842 – 1852)
- Raja Bhairam Deo (27 Aug 1852 – 20 Jul 1891)
- Raja Rudra Pratap Deo (20 Jul 1891 – 1921)
- H H Maharani Prafulla Kumari Devi (Rani) (23 Nov 1921 – 28 Feb 1936) – married Prince Prafulla Chandra Bhanj Deo of Mayurbhanj)
- H H Maharaja Pravir Chandra Bhanj Deo (28 Oct 1936 – 1948)

=== Titular ===
- H H Maharaja Pravir Chandra Bhanj Deo (1948 – 25 March 1966)
- H H Maharaja Vijay Chandra Bhanj Deo (25 March 1966 – 12 April 1970)
- H H Maharaja Bharat Chandra Bhanj Deo ( 12 April 1970 – 1996)
- H H Maharaja Kamal Chandra Bhanj Deo (1996 – current)

== See also ==
- Company rule in India
