= Lakheshwar Baghel =

Indian politician

Deputy Leader of Opposition Chhattisgarh Legislative Assembly
- Incumbent
- Assumed office 20 February 2026
- Leader: Charan Das Mahant

Member of Chhattisgarh Legislative Assembly
- Incumbent
- Assumed office 2013
- Preceded by: Shubhau Kashyap
- Constituency: Bastar

Personal details
- Party: Indian National Congress
- Profession: Politician

Lakheshwar Baghel (born 1969) is an Indian politician from Chhattisgarh. He is an MLA from Bastar Assembly constituency, which is a reserved constituency for Scheduled Tribes community, in Bastar district. He won the 2023 Chhattisgarh Legislative Assembly election, representing the Indian National Congress.

== Early life and education ==
Baghel is from Bastar, Chhattisgarh. He is the son of later Duryodhan Baghel. He completed his graduation in arts in 1981 at Government Post Graduate College, Jagdalpur, which is affiliated with Pandit Ravishankar University, Raipur.

== Career ==
Baghel won from Bastar Assembly constituency representing the Indian National Congress in the 2023 Chhattisgarh Legislative Assembly election. He polled 68,401 votes and defeated his nearest rival, Maniram Kashyap of the Bharatiya Janata Party, by a margin of 6,434 votes. He first became an MLA winning the 2013 Chhattisgarh Legislative Assembly election defeating Subhau Kashyap of the BJP, by a margin of 19,168 votes. He retained the seat in the 2018 Chhattisgarh Legislative Assembly election defeating Kashyap again, by a bigger margin of 33.471 votes. He won for the third consecutive time in 2023 election.
