= Deepak Baij =

Indian politician

President Chhattisgarh Pradesh Congress Committee
- Incumbent
- Assumed office 12 July 2023
- Preceded by: Mohan Markam

Member of Parliament, Lok Sabha
- In office 6 June 2019 – 4 June 2024
- Preceded by: Dinesh Kashyap
- Succeeded by: Mahesh Kashyap
- Constituency: Bastar

Member of the Chhattisgarh Legislative Assembly
- In office 8 December 2008 – 6 June 2019
- Succeeded by: Rajman Venjam
- Constituency: Chitrakot

Personal details
- Born: 14 July 1981 (age 45)
- Party: Indian National Congress

Deepak Baij is an Indian politician. He is currently serves as president of Chhattisgarh Pradesh Congress Committee. He was elected to the Lok Sabha, the lower house of the Parliament of India from Bastar, Chhattisgarh in the 2019 Indian general election as a member of the Indian National Congress.
