= Marwahi =

Village in Chhattisgarh, India

- Location in Chhattisgarh
- Coordinates: 23.006°N 82.055°E
- District: Gaurella-Pendra-Marwahi
- State: Chhattisgarh
- Country: India

Population (2011)
  - Total: 4,060

Languages
  - Spoken: Hindi, Chhattisgarhi

Marwahi is a village in Gaurella-Pendra-Marwahi district in the state of Chhattisgarh, India.

== Demographics ==
In the 2011 Census of India, the population was 4,060. 2,086 were males and 1,974 were females. The literacy rate was 83.84%, which was higher than the 70.28% figure for all of Chhattisgarh.

== See also ==
- Gaurella-Pendra-Marwahi district
