= Tokapal =

Village in Bastar, Chhattisgarh, India

Tokapal is a village near Jagdalpur in the Bastar district of Chhattisgarh state of India.
