= Ajit Jogi =

1st Chief Minister of Chhattisgarh (born 1946)

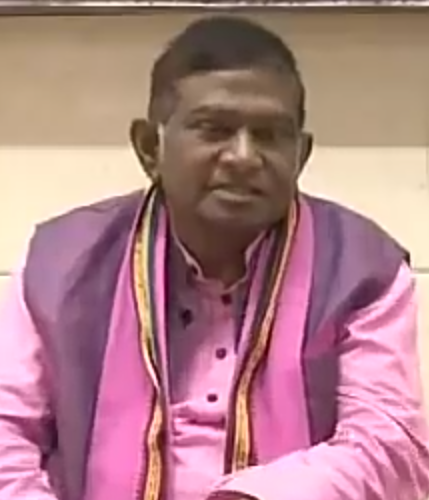

1st President of the Janta Congress Chhattisgarh
- In office 23 June 2016 – 29 May 2020
- Preceded by: Office Established
- Succeeded by: Amit Jogi

1st Chief Minister of Chhattisgarh
- In office 9 November 2000 – 6 December 2003
- Governor: Dinesh Nandan Sahay; Krishna Mohan Seth
- Preceded by: Office Established
- Succeeded by: Raman Singh

Member of the Chhattisgarh Legislative Assembly
- In office 11 December 2018 – 29 May 2020
- Preceded by: Amit Jogi
- Succeeded by: Krishna Kumar Dhruw
- Constituency: Marwahi
- In office 23 February 2001 – 2013
- Preceded by: Ram Dayal Uike
- Succeeded by: Amit Jogi
- Constituency: Marwahi

Member of Parliament, Lok Sabha
- In office 16 May 2004 – 2008
- Preceded by: Shyama Charan Shukla
- Succeeded by: Chandulal Sahu
- Constituency: Mahasamund
- In office 10 March 1998 – 26 April 1999
- Preceded by: Nand Kumar Sai
- Succeeded by: Vishnu Deo Sai
- Constituency: Raigarh

Member of Parliament, Rajya Sabha
- In office 1986–1998
- Constituency: Madhya Pradesh

District Collector of Raipur In Office
- In office 1978–1981

Personal details
- Born: 29 April 1946 Gaurella, Central Provinces and Berar, British India
- Died: 29 May 2020 (aged 74) Raipur, Chhattisgarh, India
- Party: Janta Congress Chhattisgarh (2016 - 2020)
- Other political affiliations: Indian National Congress (till 2016)
- Spouse: Dr. Renu Jogi
- Children: Amit Jogi
- Education: Faculty of Law, University of Delhi

Ajit Pramod Kumar Jogi (29 April 1946 – 29 May 2020) was an Indian politician who served as the first Chief Minister of Chhattisgarh from 2000 to 2003 and a member of the Chhattisgarh Legislative Assembly from Marwahi from 2001 to 2013 and from 2018 to 2020. He also served as a member of Lok Sabha from Mahasamund from 2004 to 2008 and from Raigarh from 1998 to 1999 and member of the Rajya Sabha from Madhya Pradesh from 1986 to 1998 and District Collector of Raipur from 1978 to 1981. He was a member of Indian National Congress till 2016 and the founder of the political party named Janta Congress Chhattisgarh and the first President of the party from 2016 until his death in 2020.

== Education ==
Jogi studied Mechanical Engineering at Maulana Azad College of Technology (MACT), Bhopal. He was the college topper and hence received the University Gold Medal in 1968. He studied law at the Faculty of Law, University of Delhi. After briefly working as a lecturer at the National Institute of Technology, Raipur, he was selected for two of the most coveted civil services of India; the Indian Police Service and the Indian Administrative Service. He was selected for the Indian Police Service aged 22. Two years later he was selected for Indian Administrative Service (IAS). He was posted in his home state, Madhya Pradesh as an IAS officer.

== Personal life ==
He was born on April 29, 1946, at Gaurela in Marwahi district of Chhattisgarh in a Christian family. He is survived by his wife Renu Jogi who is MLA from Kota constituency and son, Amit Jogi, who is a former MLA. He was a gold medallist in Mechanical Engineering. He began his professional career as a lecturer in one of the engineering colleges of Raipur city. After completing his IAS training he was deputed at Raipur as District Magistrate. He was chosen by the Chief Minister Prakash Chandra Sethi to be the collector for Sidhi district. He later served as the collector of Shahdol, Raipur and Indore districts. He was considered a bright officer in his role as an IAS officer. He grasped issues quickly, which enabled him to guide his political seniors correctly, as he had a good knowledge of rules and regulations. He was known for having a good memory. He could quote the sections from acts at appropriate moments. Even his juniors in court work used to emulate his work. In 2000 his daughter Anusha committed suicide. In 2004, he met with a car crash while campaigning for the Lok Sabha elections in Mahasamund, which left him paralysed from the waist down. However, he kept himself physically active for nearly 16 years and remained active in politics. In his final years he was working on his autobiography.

== Political career ==
In the course of his professional work in Sidhi district, he was introduced to Arjun Singh, a prominent politician from Madhya Pradesh, who later became his mentor in politics. When Arjun Singh became Chief Minister in 1980, he appointed Ajit Jogi as the collector for Raipur and later that of Indore. Ajit Jogi was introduced couple of times by Arjun Singh to Rajiv Gandhi, who was President of Congress Party, who took special interest in him and a guiding factor for him to quit professional service to enter politics. He quit the civil services in 1986 and joined Indian National Congress party. Later he became member of Rajya Sabha aged 40. He was nominated for the second time too for Rajya Sabha in year 1992, during Prime Ministership of Late P. V. Narasimha Rao. However, he rose to prominence after creation of state Chhattisgarh from the state of Madhya Pradesh in November 2000, when he was chosen to be its first Chief Minister. However BJP won the state's maiden elections held in December 2003, and Ajit Jogi's Congress government was unseated. Though BJP retained power by winning elections in year 2008 and 2013, Ajit Jogi retained his prominence in State Congress party. In 1998, he contested the Lok Sabha elections from Raigarh, a constituency reserve for members of Scheduled Tribe and won. However, he lost the Lok Sabha elections in year 1999 from Shahdol. In year 2000, Chhattisgarh was carved out of Madhya Pradesh, and Sonia Gandhi as President of Congress, chose him as Chief Minister of the newly carved state. Though he did not have political experience which was considered a limitation, his immense experience as Government servant and intelligence made him comfortable in the role and adjust easily. As Chief Minister he had complete grip on state affairs. Ajit Jogi was a unique person who combined politics in administration and administration in politics in his role of governing the state. As the decision making was centralised with him, ministers had little work. His bureaucrats used to take important decisions regarding affairs of the state. However the elections in November 2003 proved disappointing for him. He had an immense popularity in Satnami Community, a powerful Scheduled Caste group in Chhattisgarh. In 2016, he floated the Janata Congress Chhattisgarh (JCC), after appealing to the Congress high command. In 2018, his party tied up with the Bahujan Samaj Party (BSP), for the Assembly elections. He is known to have a new form of politics, one that invoked Chhattisgarh pride and sub-nationalism. Even after near-fatal accident in a car crash in 2004 while campaigning for Lok sabha elections from Mahasamund which made him paralysed from waist downwards, Jogi contested assembly election and won against his ex-party colleague Vidya Charan Shukla from BJP.

=== 2014 Lok Sabha election campaign ===
During the run-up to the 2014 Lok Sabha elections for the Mahasamund seat, eleven independent candidates filed their nominations in the name of Chandu Lal Sahu. Ajit Jogi was representing Indian National Congress, his main contender was Chandu Lal Sahu from the BJP. Sahu ultimately won the election for the Mahasamund seat but only by small margin of 133 votes and Jogi was accused of creating 11 namesakes similar to his BJP rival, as independents, to confuse voters.

=== Janta Congress Chhattisgarh ===
The Janta Congress Chhattisgarh political party was founded by Jogi, after he and his son Amit were expelled from the Indian National Congress due to anti-party activities as well as sabotaging Antagarh by-poll elections. Amit was expelled for six years.

Jogi launched a party in Thathapur village of Kawardha district and directly challenged Chief Minister of Chhattisgarh Raman Singh.

In February 2018, Jogi announced that he would contest the election from Rajnandgaon, and after some time he also announced that he would contest the election from Marwahi. On 29 April Jogi gathered more than 72000 people for rally on his birthday.

== Positions held ==
- Jogi served as a District collector of Indore during 1981–85
- 1986–87 Member, All India Congress Committee (AICC) on welfare of scheduled castes and scheduled tribes.
- 1986–1998 Member, Rajya Sabha (two terms)
- 1987–1989 General secretary, Pradesh-Congress Committee, Madhya Pradesh and also, member of committees on Public Undertakings, Industries, and Railways.
- 1989 Central Observer of the Indian National Congress for elections to Lok Sabha from constituencies in Manipur.
- 1995 Central Observer of the Indian National Congress for elections to Sikkim Assembly.
- 1995-96 Chairman of Committees on Science and Technology and Environment and Forests
- 1996 Member, Core group, AICC Parliamentary elections (Lok Sabha)
- 1996 Indian Delegation to the United Nations for the 50th Anniversary Celebrations, New York.
- 1997 Observer, Delhi Pradesh Congress Committee Elections. Member, AICC. Member of committees on Transport and Tourism, Rural and Urban Development, Consultative Committee, Ministry of Coal, Consultative Committee, Ministry of Energy, Public Accounts Committee, Convenor, Sub-Committee on Indirect Taxes, Panel of vice-chairmen, Rajya Sabha
- 1997 Indian Delegation to 98th IPU Conference, Cairo
- 1998 Elected as a Member of Parliament (MP) to the 12th Lok Sabha for the Raigarh constituency in Chhattisgarh
- 1998–2000 Spokesman, AICC, Whip, Congress Parliamentary Party, Working President, Madhya Pradesh Congress Committee
- 1998–99 Member, Committee on Human Resource Development and its Sub-Committee-II on Medical Education, Committee on Coal, Consultative Committee, Ministry of Coal
- 2000–2003 Chief Minister of Chhattisgarh
- 2004–2008 MP in the 14th Lok Sabha for Mahasamund, Chhattisgarh
- 2008– Member of the Legislative Assembly of Chhattisgarh, representing the Marwahi constituency

== Controversies ==
In June 2007, Jogi and his son were arrested in connection with the murder of Nationalist Congress Party (NCP) treasurer Ram Avtar Jaggi, who was shot dead in June 2003. However, after five years of the registering of a case against him, Central Bureau of Investigation (CBI) based on an opinion of then Additional Solicitor General of India (ASG) Gopal Subramanian said that Jogi could not be prosecuted under any law. However the Bharatiya Janata Party (BJP) alleged that the Congress led UPA government misused the Central Bureau of Investigation (CBI) to protect Jogi.

On 6 June 2016, Jogi announced he was breaking his affiliation with Indian National Congress at a political gathering in Chhattisgarh.

In August 2019, a high-level judicial committee dismissed Jogi's claim of belonging to a Scheduled Tribe (ST) and cancelled all his caste certificates. Jogi was booked under Indian Penal Code sections 420 (cheating), 467 (forgery of valuable security), 468 (forgery for purpose of cheating) and 471 (using as genuine a forged document or electronic record). Additionally, Jogi was accused of cheating and forgery in connection with the declaration in a poll affidavit submitted by him during the 2013 Assembly elections. Facing a first information report (FIR) and arrests in the fake caste certificate case, Jogi was admitted to a private hospital in Delhi-NCR after he complained of breathing problem.

== Death ==
Jogi died in the afternoon of Friday, 29 May 2020, aged 74. His son, Amit Jogi, confirmed the news on his official Twitter page. Jogi was admitted to hospital after a heart attack, which was caused by a tamarind seed stuck in his throat. Since he was a Christian, he was laid to rest at a cemetery at Jyotipur area in Gaurela town of GPM district in Chhattisgarh.

Lok Sabha
Preceded by Nand Kumar Sai	Member of Parliament for Raigarh; 1998 – 1999	Succeeded by Vishnudeo Sai
Preceded by Shyama Charan Shukla	Member of Parliament for Mahasamund; 2004 – 2009	Succeeded by Chandu Lal Sahu
Political offices
Preceded by Chhattisgarh part of Madhya Pradesh State	Chief Minister of Chhattisgarh; 9 November 2000 – 6 December 2003	Succeeded by Raman Singh
