= Dinesh Kashyap =

Indian politician

Member of Parliament, Lok Sabha
- In office 13 May 2011 – 23 May 2019
- Preceded by: Baliram Kashyap
- Succeeded by: Deepak Baij
- Constituency: Bastar

Member of Madhya Pradesh Legislative Assembly
- In office 1990–1993
- Preceded by: Jhitroo Ram Baghel
- Succeeded by: Jhitroo Ram Baghel
- Constituency: Jagdalpur

Personal details
- Born: 18 November 1962 (age 63) Bastar, Chhattisgarh, India
- Party: Bharatiya Janata Party
- Spouse: Vedwati Kashyap
- Children: 2 sons and 1 daughters
- Parent: Baliram Kashyap (father) Manki Kasyap (mother)
- Website: Dinesh Kashyap, M.P

Dinesh Baliram Kashyap (born 18 November 1962) is an Indian politician and member of the Bharatiya Janta Party. He was a Member of Parliament from Bastar and also a Member of the Madhya Pradesh Legislative Assembly.

== Personal life ==
Shri Dinesh Kashyap was brought up in a political family and learn the art of politics from childhood from his father. His father Shri Baliram Kashyap was a Member of Parliament from BJP from 1998 to 2011. He was one of the hardcore supporters of Shri Atal Bihari Vajpayee and Shri L K Advani. So, inspired by his father Shri Dinesh Kashyap pursued MA in political science from Pandit Ravishankar Shukla University, Raipur. His brother Kedar Nath Kashyap was a Cabinet Minister in Dr. Raman Singh's Government.

He married Vedwati Kashyap in January 1991 and has 2 sons and 1 daughter.

== Political life ==
From his youth he was a leader for the youth wing of the Bastar Area. He was elected as General Secretary of Yuva Morcha, Bastar from 1985 to 1990. Kashyap was first elected as a Member of the Madhya Pradesh Legislative Assembly. After this he has been active in the socio-active life of the ST people of Chhattisgarh. Now he is the national secretary, of BJP ST Moracha.

In 2011, he was elected to the 15th Lok Sabha in a bye-election, during this phase he hold Member of, Standing Committee on Social Justice and Empowerment in May 2014, re-elected to Lok Sabha for 2nd term. During this phase he holds positions as a Member, the Standing Committee on Food, Consumer Affairs and Public distribution & Member, of Consultative Committee, of Ministry of Steel and Mines, under the Narendra Modi Government.

== In news ==
He led in mainstream campaigns for tribal development and agricultural facilities for the ST people. His active leadership also resulted in many cooperative society developments in the agricultural and horticultural sectors as well as the rural health sector in the district of Bastar, Chhattisgarh.

Under his leadership, in February 2016, the double line to Kirandul to Visakhapatnam route was and on 20 November 2017, Baster (Jagdalpur) has been linked to North and West India by railway network and connected to Vishakhapatnam to connect with East and South India.

== Positions held ==
- 1985–1990: General Secretary, Yuva Morcha, Bastar Chhattisgarh
- 1990–1993: Member, Madhya Pradesh Legislative Assembly
- 1995: Member, Zilla Panchayat, Bastar, Chhattisgarh
- 1998–2004: District President, BJP ST Morcha, Chhattisgarh
- 2004–2010: State President, BJP ST Morcha, Chhattisgarh
- 2007–2008: Nominated President of District Central Co-operative Bank, District. Bastar
- 2008–2013: Elected President of District Central Co-operative Bank, District. Bastar
- 13 May 2011: Elected to the 15th Lok Sabha in a bye-election Member, Consultative Committee, Ministry of Panchayati Raj
- 31 Aug. 2011 – 18 May 2014: Member, Standing Committee on Social Justice and Empowerment
- May 2014: Re-elected to 16th Lok Sabha (second term)
- 1 Sep. 2014 onwards: Member, Committee on Absence of Members from the Sittings of the House, Member, Standing Committee on Food, Consumer Affairs and Public Distribution & Member, Consultative Committee, Ministry of Steel and Mines. National Secretary, BJP ST Morcha
