= Krishna Kumar Dhruw =

Indian politician

Member of legislative assembly
- In office 2020–2023
- Preceded by: Ajit Jogi
- Succeeded by: Pranav Kumar Marpachhi
- Constituency: Marwahi

Personal details
- Party: Indian National Congress
- Profession: Politician, medical practitioner

Krishna Kumar Dhruw is an Indian politician and medical practitioner from Chhattisgarh. He was the Indian National Congress MLA of Marwahi state Assembly constituency.
