= Baliram Kashyap =

Indian politician (1936–2011)

Member of Parliament, Lok Sabha
- In office 3 March 1998 — 10 March 2011
- Preceded by: Mahendra Karma
- Succeeded by: Dinesh Kashyap
- Constituency: Bastar

Member of Madhya Pradesh Legislative Assembly
- In office 1977–1992
- Succeeded by: Antu Ram Kashyap
- Constituency: Bhanpuri
- In office 1972–1977
- Preceded by: D. Kosha
- Succeeded by: Birendra Pandey
- Constituency: Jagdalpur

Personal details
- Born: 11 March 1936 Bastar, Central Provinces and Berar, British India
- Died: 10 March 2011 (aged 74) New Delhi, India
- Party: Bharatiya Janata Party
- Spouse: Manaki Kashyap
- Children: 4 sons and 3 daughters

Baliram Mahadev Kashyap (11 March 1936 – 10 March 2011) was an Indian politician. He was a member of the 12th, 13th, 14th, and 15th Lok Sabhas of India. He represented the Bastar constituency of Chhattisgarh and was a member of the Bharatiya Janata Party (BJP) political party. Kashyap died on 10 March 2011, only one day before his 75th birthday. He is known as Balasaheb Thackeray of Bastar.

== Early life and education ==
Baliram Kashyap was born on 11 March 1936 at Bhanpuri, Distt. Bastar (Chhattisgarh). His father's name was Shri Mahadev Kashyap and mother's name was Smt. Radhibai Kashyap. He married Smt. Manaki Kashyap on 10 Mar 1958. He had 4 sons and 3 daughters. He was educated at Anglo-Indian School Kondagaon, Bastar, Madhya Pradesh but did not completed his matriculation. By profession he was an agriculturist.

== Positions held ==
- 1972–92 Member, Madhya Pradesh Legislative Assembly
- 1977–78 Minister of State, Public Works Department, Government of Madhya Pradesh
- 1978–80 & 1989–92 Cabinet Minister, Tribal Welfare, Government of Madhya Pradesh
- 1998–99 Elected to 12th Lok Sabha
  - Whip, B.J.P. Parliamentary Party, Lok Sabha
  - Member, Committee on Agriculture
- 1999 Re-elected to 13th Lok Sabha (2nd term)
- 1999–2000
  - Member, Consultative Committee, Ministry of Food and Consumer Affairs
  - Member, Committee on Human Resource Development
- 2000–2004 Member, Consultative Committee, Ministry of Commerce and Industry
- 2004 Re-elected to 14th Lok Sabha (3rd term)
- 2004–2006 Member, Committee on Petitions
- 2004–2009 Member, Committee on Food, Consumer Affairs and Public Distribution
- 2009 Re-elected to 15th Lok Sabha (4th term)
- 31 Aug 2009 Member, Committee on Social Justice and Empowerment
