= Devati Karma =

Indian politician

Devati Karma (born 1 July 1962) is an Indian politician from Chhattisgarh and a two term Member of the Chhattisgarh Legislative Assembly. Devati Karma represented the Dantewara Assembly constituency.

== Positions held ==
Year	Description
2013 - 2018	Elected to 4th Chhattisgarh Assembly: Member - Committee on Women and Child Development (2014–15)
2019 - 2023	Elected to 5th Chhattisgarh Assembly in by election (2nd term)
