= Gaurela-Pendra-Marwahi district =

- District of Chhattisgarh
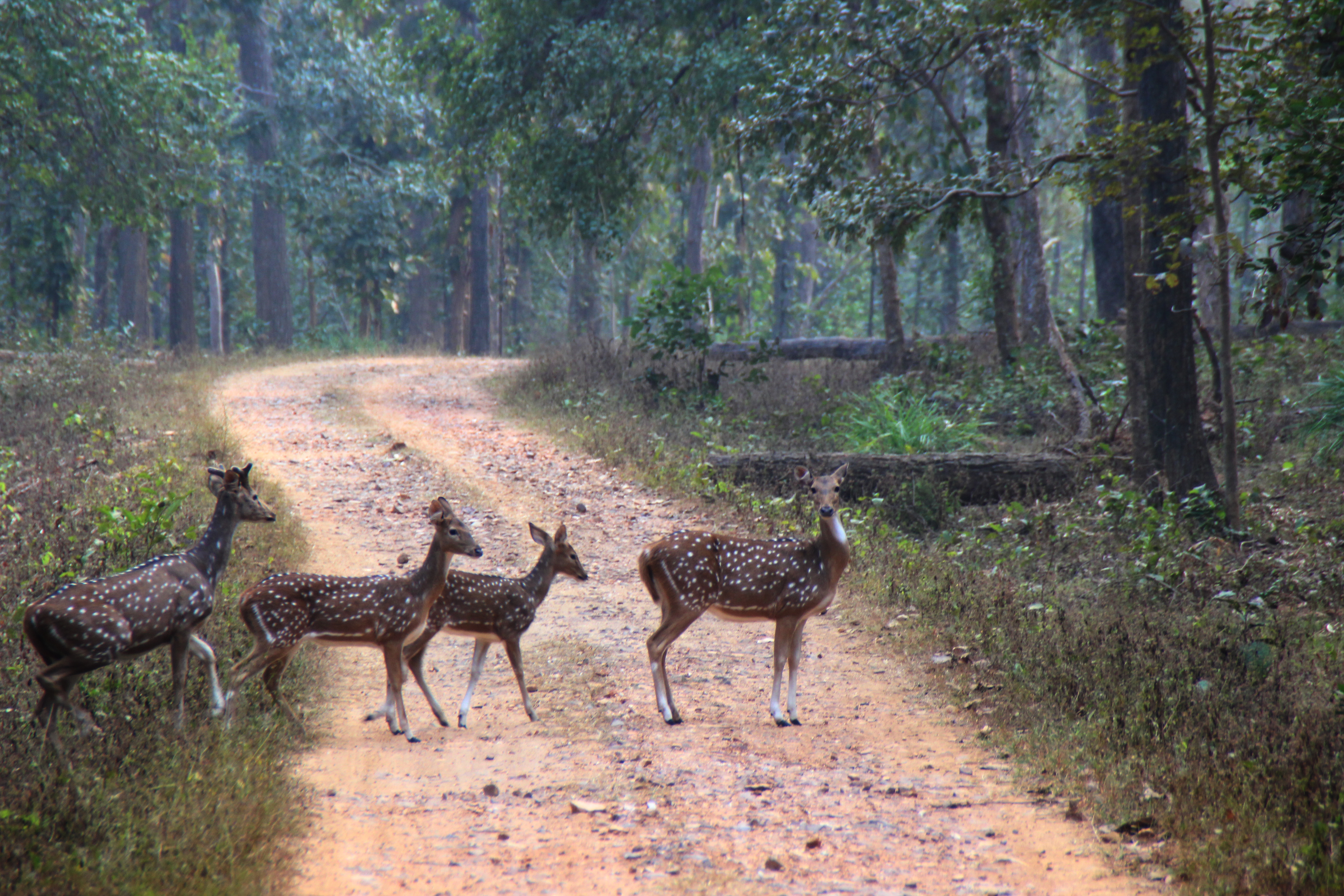
- Achanakmaar Tiger reserve
- Country: India
- State: Chhattisgarh
- Division: Bilaspur
- Collector and District magistrate: VIJAY DAYARAM K (भा.प्र.से.)
- Lok Sabha constituency: Korba 04, Bilaspur 05
- Legislative assembly: Marwahi 24, Kota 25
- Established: 10 February 2020
- Headquarters: Gaurella

Area
  - Total: 2,307.39 km^{2} (890.89 sq mi)

Population (2011)
  - Total: 336,420
  - Density: 145.80/km^{2} (377.62/sq mi)
- Time zone: UTC+05:30 (IST)
- PIN: 49511x (Gaurela Pendra Marwahi)
- Website: gaurela-pendra-marwahi.cg.gov.in

Gaurela-Pendra-Marwahi district is a district in the Indian state of Chhattisgarh. Gaurella is the headquarters of the district. It was carved out of Bilaspur district and inaugurated in February 2020.

== Geography ==
Gaurela-Pendra-Marwahi district is bordered by Koriya and Korba districts to the east, Bilaspur and Mungeli districts to the south, and Anuppur district in Madhya Pradesh to the northwest. The district is predominantly mountainous.

== list of collectors & district magistrate ==
1. Sikha Singh Rajput Tiwari [IAS][ Special Duty Officer]

2. Doman Singh [Promoted IAS]

3. Namrata Gandhi [IAS]

4. Recha Prakash Choudhary [IAS]

5. Priyanka Rishi Mahoba [IAS]

6. leena Kamlesh Mandvi [IAS]

7. Santosh kumar dewangan [IAS]

8. Vijay dayaram K [IAS]

== History ==
The area of Pendra Zamindari in the newly formed district of Gaurela-Pendra-Marwahi was 774 square miles and, it had 225 villages under its jurisdiction. Two brothers, Hindu Singh and Chhindu Singh lived under the protection of the Kalchuri king of Ratnapur. They found a sack full of money lying by the roadside, which they handed over to the king. The king was pleased with their honesty and rewarded them by granting them the Pendra Zamindari. This Zamindari remained in their family for 12 generations. Hindu Singh's dynasty flourished greatly from Pandrivana, i.e., Pendra. Within 80 to 100 years, his descendants became the officers of Kenda, Uparoda, and Matin. Even during the Maratha rule, they continued to hold their Zamindari till 1798. In 1818, when Colonel Agnew became the Superintendent of Chhattisgarh, he handed over the Zamindari to Ajit Singh, a descendant of the old officer. In the Maratha period, Pendra Garh was an important centre of the Pindharis. The region, was inhabited by Pindare dacoits who used to launch attacks on Ratanpur and Jabalpur. Because of their activities, the region came to be known as Pindara, which later became Pendra.

The first newspaper of Chhattisgarh, Chhattisgarh Mitra, was published as a monthly magazine from Pendra in 1900 under the editorship of Pandit Madhavrao Sapre. The district of Gaurela-Pendra-Marwahi is famous not only in Chhattisgarh but throughout India for its unique features, including the quality of its rice and its rich tribal cultural heritage.

== Demographics ==
Religions in Gaurela-Pendra-Marwahi district (2011)
Religion	Percent
Hinduism	94.10%
Other (tribal religion)	2.93%
Islam	2.01%
Christianity	0.53%
Other or not stated	0.43%

At the time of the 2011 census, the district had a population of 3,36,420. Gaurela-Pendra-Marwahi district has a sex ratio of 997 females per 1000 males and a literacy rate of 55.92%. 32,285 (9.60%) live in urban areas. Scheduled Castes and Scheduled Tribes make up 20,802 (6.18%) and 192,073 (57.09%) of the population respectively.

Languages of Gaurela-Pendra-Marwahi district (2011)
1. Chhattisgarhi (74.6%)
2. Hindi (23.5%)
3. Others (1.93%)

According to the 2011 census, 74.59% of the district's population speaks Chhattisgarhi, while 23.48% speaks Hindi as their first language.

== Tourism ==
Achanakmaar Tiger reserve (achanakmar forest guest house, sal valley resort, Lamni forest rest house, chhaparwa forest rest house, Sonbhadra tourist resort amadob, the royal river resort amadob)

Achankmaar Biosphere Reserve

Marhimata mandir bhanwartank

Pandav goofa dhanpur

durga mandir dhanpur

kali mandir pendra

RAJ MAHAL PENDRA

baba hazrat saiyad insan ali dargah larkeni

Benibaai dhhobhar

Kabir ka chabutra keochi (chher chhera resort)

Jaleswardham

mai ki bagiya

Durgadhara

thath pathra

Laxman Dhara

Lakshman Ghat khardi

Gangnai dam nature camp salhekota

Jhojha waterfall basti

Jogi Goofa lamna

sonkund sonmuda

malaniya dam pakariya

Rajmergarh hilltop

Amreswar mahadev mandir

== See also ==
- Districts of Chhattisgarh
