= 1957 Madhya Pradesh Legislative Assembly election =

Indian state election

- 25 February 1957

All 288 seats in the Madhya Pradesh Legislative Assembly 145 seats needed for a majority
- Registered: 13,871,727
- Turnout: 37.17%
	First party	Second party
	INC	PSP
Party	INC	PSP
Last election		Did not contest
Seats won	232	12
Seat change	▲38	N/A
Popular vote	36,91,999	9,76,021
Percentage	49.83%	13.17%
Swing	▲0.76%	N/A
Chief Minister before election
Kailash Nath Katju
INC
Elected Chief Minister
Kailash Nath Katju
INC

Elections to the Madhya Pradesh Legislative Assembly were held on 25 February 1957. 1,108 candidates contested for the 218 constituencies in the Assembly. There were 69 two-member constituencies and 149 single-member constituencies.

== State Reorganization ==
On 1 November 1956, under States Reorganisation Act, 1956, Madhya Bharat (except the Sunel enclave of the Mandsaur district), Vindhya Pradesh, Bhopal State and the Sironj sub-division of the Kota district of Rajasthan were merged into Madhya Pradesh while the Marathi-speaking districts of Nagpur division and Amravati division (namely Buldana, Akola, Amravati, Yavatmal, Wardha, Nagpur, Bhandara and Chanda), were transferred to Bombay State. This resulted in increase in assembly constituencies from 184 with 232 seats to 218 constituencies with 288 seats during 1957 elections.

== Results ==
Summary of results of the 1957 Madhya Pradesh Legislative Assembly election
Political party	Flag	Seats Contested	Won	Net change in seats	% of Seats	Votes	Vote %	Change in vote %
Indian National Congress		288	232	▲38	80.56	36,91,999	49.83	▲0.76
Praja Socialist Party		163	12	New	4.16	9,76,021	13.17	New
Bharatiya Jana Sangh		133	10	▲10	3.47	7,33,315	9.90	▲6.32
Akhil Bharatiya Ram Rajya Parishad		53	5	▲2	1.75	2,29,010	3.09	▲0.58
Akhil Bharatiya Hindu Mahasabha		48	7	▲7	2.43	3,45,122	4.66	▲4.56
Communist Party of India		25	2	▲2	0.69	1,20,549	1.63	▲4.66
Independent		372	20	▼3	6.94	12,22,003	16.49	N/A
		Total Seats	288 (▲56)	Voters	1,99,31,685	Turnout	74,08,768 (37.17%)	

== Elected members ==
Constituency	Reserved for	Elected Member	Party
Lahar	SC	Premkumari Ranvijay Singh	Indian National Congress
Lahar	SC	Gokul Prasad Devlal	Indian National Congress
Mehgaon	None	Yugalkishore Ramkishore	Praja Socialist Party
Bhind	None	Narsinghrao Jabarsingh	Indian National Congress
Attair	None	Hargyansingh Subalal	Praja Socialist Party
Gahad	None	Sushila Devi Sovransingh	Indian National Congress
Pichhore Gird	SC	Brinda Sahai	Indian National Congress
Pichhore Gird	SC	Raja Ram Singh	Indian National Congress
Gird	None	Ghule Murlidhar	Indian National Congress
Lashkar	None	Bangad Ram Niwas	Indian National Congress
Morar	None	Chandra Kala Sahai	Indian National Congress
Gwalior	None	Ramchandra	Communist Party of India
Ambah	None	Ram Niwas Chitralal	Indian National Congress
Morena	SC	Kushwah Kunwar Yashwantsingh	Indian National Congress
Morena	SC	Sagar Chameli Bai	Indian National Congress
Joura	None	Chhote lal Bharadwaj Khashiprasad	Independent
Sabalgarh	SC	Baboolal	Indian National Congress
Sabalgarh	SC	Balmukand	Indian National Congress
Sheopur	None	Raghunath	Hindu Mahasabha
Shivpur	SC	Tularam	Indian National Congress
Shivpur	SC	Maloji	Independent
Karera	None	Sharma Gautam	Indian National Congress
Pichhore-Shivpore	None	Laxminarain	Hindu Mahasabha
Kolaras	None	Vedehi Charan	Indian National Congress
Guna	None	Daulat Ram	Indian National Congress
Chachaura	None	Sagarsingh Sisodia	Indian National Congress
Ashoknagar	SC	Ramdayal Singh	Indian National Congress
Ashoknagar	SC	Dulichand	Indian National Congress
Munagoli	None	Khalak Singh	Hindu Mahasabha
Kurwai	None	Takhatmal	Indian National Congress
Vidisha	SC	Hiralal Pippal	Indian National Congress
Vidisha	SC	Ajaisingh	Indian National Congress
Sironi	None	Madanlal	Hindu Mahasabha
Kljocjoir	None	Prabhudayal Bhanwarlal	Indian National Congress
Raogarj	None	Dube Ramcharan	Independent
Biaora	None	Laxman Singh	Independent
Narsingarh	SC	Bhanwarlal Jivan	Indian National Congress
Narsingarh	SC	Vijaivargiya Radhavallabh	Indian National Congress
Susner	None	Haribhau	Bharatiya Jana Sangh
Agar	None	Madanlal	Bharatiya Jana Sangh
Shaipur	SC	Pratapbhai	Indian National Congress
Shaipur	SC	Kishanlal	Bharatiya Jana Sangh
Shujalpur	None	Vishnucharan	Indian National Congress
Kannod	None	Manjulabai Govindrao Wagle	Indian National Congress
Dewas	SC	Patwardhan Anant Sadashiv	Indian National Congress
Dewas	SC	Bapulal Kishan	Indian National Congress
Sonkatch	None	Bhagirathsingh Puransingh	Bharatiya Jana Sangh
Mahidpur	SC	Totala Rameshwar Dayal Mahadeo	Indian National Congress
Mahidpur	SC	Suryawansi Durgadas Bhagwan Das	Indian National Congress
Ujjain North	None	Rajdan Kumar Kishori	Indian National Congress
Ujjain South	None	Ayachit Vishwanath Vasudeo	Indian National Congress
Barnagar	None	Mehta Kanhaiyalal Bhoorabhai	Indian National Congress
Khacraud	None	Virendrasingh Parwatsingh	Hindu Mahasabha
Manasa	None	Sunderlal	Bharatiya Jana Sangh
Jawad	None	Virendra Kumar	Bharatiya Jana Sangh
Neemuch	None	Sitaram Jajoo	Indian National Congress
Garoth	SC	Saraswati Devi Sharda	Indian National Congress
Garoth	SC	Vimal Kumar	Bharatiya Jana Sangh
Sitamau	None	Bhanwarlal	Indian National Congress
Mandsaur	None	Shyam Sunder	Indian National Congress
Jaora	None	Kailashnath Katju	Indian National Congress
A lot	SC	Devisingh	Indian National Congress
A lot	SC	Miyaram	Indian National Congress
Ralam	None	Suman Jain	Indian National Congress
Thandia	ST	Nathulal	Independent
Jhabua	ST	Sursingh	Indian National Congress
Jobat	ST	Ganga	Indian National Congress
Aliraipur	ST	Chatrarsingh	Indian National Congress
Kukshi	ST	Rathusingh	Indian National Congress
Sardarpur	None	Shankar Lal Garg	Indian National Congress
Badnawar	None	Manoharsingh Mehta	Indian National Congress
Dhat	None	Vasantrao Pradhan	Hindu Mahasabha
Manawar East	ST	Ranjitsingh	Hindu Mahasabha
Manawar West	ST	Shivbhanu	Indian National Congress
Depalpur	SC	Vishna Sajjansingh	Indian National Congress
Depalpur	SC	Joshi Nandlal	Indian National Congress
Indore	None	Dravid Vyanktesh	Indian National Congress
Indore City East	None	Daji Homi	Independent
Indore City Central	None	Patodi Babulal	Indian National Congress
Indore City West	None	Mishrilal	Indian National Congress
Mhow	None	Jall Rustomji	Indian National Congress
Barwani	ST	Gulal	Bharatiya Jana Sangh
Rajpur	ST	Mangilal Tajsingh	Indian National Congress
Sendhwa	ST	Barku	Indian National Congress
Khargone	None	Ramakant Khode	Indian National Congress
Khargone	None	Sawaisingh Balramsingh	Indian National Congress
Maheshwar	SC	Vallabhdas Sitaram	Indian National Congress
Maheshwar	SC	Sadhav Sitaram	Indian National Congress
Barwaha	None	Virendrasingh Motisingh	Indian National Congress
Bhopal	None	Khan Shakir Ali Khan	Communist Party of India
Barasia	SC	Hari Krishna Singh	Indian National Congress
Barasia	SC	Bhagwan Singh	Indian National Congress
Sehore	SC	Umrao Singh	Indian National Congress
Sehore	SC	Inayattullah Khan	Indian National Congress
Budhni	None	Rajkumari Surajkala	Indian National Congress
Sanchi	None	Khuman Singh	Indian National Congress
Sanchi	None	Raja Daulat Singh	Indian National Congress
Udaipura	SC	Shankar Dayal Sharma	Indian National Congress
Deori	None	Bala Prasad Mishra	Indian National Congress
Rehli	None	Mani Bhai Jaber Bhai	Indian National Congress
Surkhi	None	B B Rai	Indian National Congress
Sagar	None	Mohammed Shafi Mohammed Subrati	Indian National Congress
Khurai	SC	Bhadai Halke	Indian National Congress
Khurai	SC	Rishabh Kumar Mohanlal	Indian National Congress
Banda	None	Swami Krishna Nand Ramcharan	Indian National Congress
Hatta	SC	Kadora	Indian National Congress
Hatta	SC	Gaya Prasad	Indian National Congress
Damoh	None	Harishchandra	Indian National Congress
Nohata	None	Guru Kunjbihari Lal	Indian National Congress
Murwara	None	Ramdas	Independent
Bilai Raghogarh	ST	Kunjilal Khoobchand	Indian National Congress
Bilai Raghogarh	ST	Chanda Bai	Indian National Congress
Sihora	ST	Kashiprasad Pande Jairam Pande	Indian National Congress
Sihora	ST	Harbhagat Singh	Indian National Congress
Patan	ST	Deva Devi	Indian National Congress
Patan	ST	Neknarain Singh	Indian National Congress
Jabalpur 1	None	Kunjilal Dharamdas	Indian National Congress
Jabalpur 2	None	Jagdishnarayan Laxminarayan	Indian National Congress
Jabalpur 3	None	Jagmohandas Seth Govind Das	Indian National Congress
Panagar	None	Parmanand Mohanlal	Indian National Congress
Bargi	None	Chandrikaprasad	Indian National Congress
Gotegaon	None	Shyamsunder Narayan	Indian National Congress
Narsimhapur	None	Sarla Devi	Indian National Congress
Gadarwara	SC	Nabha	Indian National Congress
Gadarwara	SC	Kishorilal	Indian National Congress
Sohagpu	ST	Manjabhai Jaggi	Indian National Congress
Sohagpu	ST	Narayansingh Dangal Singh	Indian National Congress
Hoshangabad	None	Nanhelal Bhurelal	Indian National Congress
Itarsi	None	Hariprasad Nandlal Chaturvedi	Indian National Congress
Hardha	SC	Gulab Bai Rameshwar	Indian National Congress
Hardha	SC	Naik Laxmanrao Bhikajee	Indian National Congress
Burhanpur	None	Abdul Quadir Mohd Masum Siddiqui	Indian National Congress
Shahpur	None	Keshorao Yashwantrao	Praja Socialist Party
Khandwa	SC	Deokaran Balchand	Indian National Congress
Khandwa	SC	Bhagwantrao Mandloi	Indian National Congress
Harsud	ST	Ramsingh Galba	Indian National Congress
Harsud	ST	Kalusingh Shersingh	Indian National Congress
Bhainadehi	ST	Somdatta Deo	Indian National Congress
Betul	ST	Mokhamsingh Sabsingh	Indian National Congress
Betul	ST	Deepchand Lakhmichand	Indian National Congress
Muitai	None	Anandrao Sonaji	Independent
Masod	None	Marotrao Lahnu	Independent
Parasia	ST	Phulbhansa	Indian National Congress
Parasia	ST	Kashiprasad Kanhaiyalal	Indian National Congress
Pagara	ST	Udaibhanushah	Indian National Congress
Chhindwara	SC	Vidyawati Vidyashankar	Indian National Congress
Chhindwara	SC	Nokhelal	Indian National Congress
Sausar	ST	Raichandbhai Narsibhai	Indian National Congress
Seoni	None	Dadu Mahendranath Singh	Indian National Congress
Barghat	None	Ravindranath Bhargava	Indian National Congress
Bhoma	ST	Manohar Rao Jatar	Indian National Congress
Bhoma	ST	Thakur Deepsing	Indian National Congress
Lakhnadon	ST	Vasantrao Uike	Indian National Congress
Niwas	ST	Sahjoo	Indian National Congress
Mehedwani	ST	Ramaisingh	Indian National Congress
Dindori	ST	Dwarka Prasad	Indian National Congress
Dindori	ST	Akali	Indian National Congress
Bichhia	ST	Baredi Budana	Indian National Congress
Mandla	None	Narayani Devi	Indian National Congress
Baihar	ST	Murlidhar Batailal Asati	Indian National Congress
Baihar	ST	Haresingh Bakhatsingh	Indian National Congress
Balaghat	None	Nandkishore Jairaj Sharma	Indian National Congress
Katangi	None	Ramniklal Amritlal	Indian National Congress
Khairlanjee	None	Shankar Lal Tiwari	Indian National Congress
Waraseonj	None	Thansingh Tikaram	Indian National Congress
Kiranpur	SC	Tejlal Tambhare Harishchandra	Indian National Congress
Kiranpur	SC	Motiram Odgoo	Indian National Congress
Kawardha	None	Dharamrajsingh	Akhil Bharatiya Ram Rajya Parishad
Birendranagar	None	Padmavati Devi	Indian National Congress
Bemetara	SC	Sheolal	Indian National Congress
Bemetara	SC	Laxmanprasad	Indian National Congress
Dhamdha	None	Ganeshram	Indian National Congress
Bhilai	ST	Govindsingh	Indian National Congress
Bhilai	ST	Udairam	Indian National Congress
Durg	None	Vishwanath Tamasker	Praja Socialist Party
Khairagarli	None	Rituparna Kishoredas	Indian National Congress
Dongargarh	SC	Bhootnath	Indian National Congress
Dongargarh	SC	Vijaylal	Indian National Congress
Dongargaon	None	Dhannalal Jain	Indian National Congress
Rajnandgaon	None	J.P.L. Francis	Praja Socialist Party
Dondi Lohara	ST	Jhamitkunwar	Indian National Congress
Chowki	ST	Kanak Kumari	Indian National Congress
Balod	None	Lesholal Gomasta	Indian National Congress
Bijapur	ST	Br Pambhoi	Indian National Congress
Dantewara	ST	Sheoram	Indian National Congress
Konta	ST	Soyam Joga	Indian National Congress
Chitrakote	ST	Sukhdu	Indian National Congress
Jagadalpur	SC	Maharaja Pravirchandra Deo	Indian National Congress
Jagadalpur	SC	Derhaprasad	Indian National Congress
Narayanpur	ST	Rameshwar	Indian National Congress
Keskal	ST	Saraduram	Indian National Congress
Kanker	ST	Pratibha Devi	Indian National Congress
Kanker	ST	Bisram	Indian National Congress
Raipur	None	Tiwari Singh Charan	Indian National Congress
Arang	SC	Gupta Lakhanlal	Indian National Congress
Arang	SC	Jagmohandas	Indian National Congress
Kurud	None	Bhopalrao Bissuli	Indian National Congress
Dhamtari	ST	Jhitkoo	Indian National Congress
Dhamtari	ST	Purshottamdas	Indian National Congress
Bindranawagarh	ST	Shyama Kumari	Indian National Congress
Bindranawagarh	ST	Shukla Pt Shyama Charan	Indian National Congress
Mahasamund	SC	Nemichand	Indian National Congress
Mahasamund	SC	Miri Bajirao	Indian National Congress
Basna	None	Rajkumar Birendra Bahadur Singh	Independent
Saraipali	None	Jaideo Gadadhar	Indian National Congress
Bhatgaon	SC	Jitendra Vijai Bahadur	Independent
Bhatgaon	SC	Moolchand	Indian National Congress
Baloda Bazar	SC	Brijlal	Praja Socialist Party
Baloda Bazar	SC	Naindas	Indian National Congress
Dharsiwan	None	Baghel Khubchand	Praja Socialist Party
Bhatapara	None	Shukla Chakrapani	Indian National Congress
Lormi	None	Gangaprasad	Akhil Bharatiya Ram Rajya Parishad
Mungeli	SC	Ramlal Ghasia	Akhil Bharatiya Ram Rajya Parishad
Mungeli	SC	Ambika Sao	Akhil Bharatiya Ram Rajya Parishad
Masturi	SC	Bashir Ahmed	Indian National Congress
Masturi	SC	Ganeshram	Indian National Congress
Bilaspur	None	Shivdulare	Indian National Congress
Kota	ST	Kashiram Tiwari	Indian National Congress
Kota	ST	Suraj Kunwar	Indian National Congress
Gourella	None	Mathua Prasad	Indian National Congress
Trnakhar	ST	Yagyaseni Kumari	Indian National Congress
Katghora	ST	Banwari Lal	Indian National Congress
Katghora	ST	Dewan Rudrasharan Pratap Singh	Indian National Congress
Champa	None	Ram Krishna	Indian National Congress
Janjgir	None	Lakheshwarilal Paliwal	Indian National Congress
Akaltara	None	Bhuwanbhasker Singh	Indian National Congress
Nwagarh	None	Bisahudas	Indian National Congress
Sakti	None	Rajabadadur Liladhar Singh	Praja Socialist Party
Chandrapur	SC	Vedram	Indian National Congress
Chandrapur	SC	Sashibhushan Singh	Independent
Sarangarh	SC	Raja Naresh Chandra Singh	Indian National Congress
Sarangarh	SC	Nanhu Dai	Indian National Congress
Rajgarh	None	Ramkumar	Praja Socialist Party
Dharamjigarh	ST	Rajasahib Chandrachud Prasad Singh Deo	Indian National Congress
Dharamjigarh	ST	Umed Singh	Indian National Congress
Ghaghoda	ST	Raja Lalit Kumar	Indian National Congress
Ghaghoda	ST	Gouri Shanker Shastri	Indian National Congress
Jashpur	ST	Raja Bijai Bhushan Singh Deo	Indian National Congress
Jashpur	ST	Johan	Indian National Congress
Pal	ST	Bhandari	Indian National Congress
Pal	ST	Kapildeo Narayan Singh	Indian National Congress
Sitapur	ST	Haribhajan Singh	Indian National Congress
Ambikapur	SC	Brijbhushan	Indian National Congress
Ambikapur	SC	Kurray Pritam	Indian National Congress
Suraipur	ST	Singh Mahadeo	Indian National Congress
Suraipur	ST	Sharma Dhirendranath	Indian National Congress
Manendragarh	ST	Singh Raghubar	Indian National Congress
Manendragarh	ST	Brijendralal	Indian National Congress
Kotma	ST	Hari Raj Kunwar	Indian National Congress
Kotma	ST	Ratan Singh	Indian National Congress
Pushpraigarh	ST	Lalan Singh	Indian National Congress
Sohagpur	None	Shambhu Nath	Indian National Congress
Bandhogarh	None	Chhotelal	Indian National Congress
Beohari	ST	Ram Kishore	Independent
Beohari	ST	Jhalkan Kumari	Indian National Congress
Singrauli	None	Shyam Kartik	Independent
Deosar	ST	Bhai Lal	Independent
Deosar	ST	Jagdeo Singh	Praja Socialist Party
Sidhi	None	Chandra Pratap	Praja Socialist Party
Majhauli	None	Arjun Singh	Independent
Mauganj	SC	Sahadeo	Indian National Congress
Mauganj	SC	Achuta Nand	Independent
Teibthar	None	Banaspati Singh	Indian National Congress
Sirmaur	None	Champa Devi	Indian National Congress
Mangawan	None	Rukmani Raman Pratap Singh	Independent
Gurh	None	Sheonath Prasad	Bharatiya Jana Sangh
Rewa	None	Joshi Jagdinsh Chand	Independent
Chitrakoot	None	Kaushalendra Pratap Bahadur Singh	Akhil Bharatiya Ram Rajya Parishad
Rampur Beghelan	None	Lal Govind Narain Singh	Indian National Congress
Amarpatan	None	Ram Hit	Bharatiya Jana Sangh
Maihar	None	Gopal Sharan Singh	Indian National Congress
Satna	SC	Shivanand	Indian National Congress
Satna	SC	Vishweshwar Prasad	Indian National Congress
Pawai	SC	Narendra Singh	Indian National Congress
Pawai	SC	Ram Das	Indian National Congress
Panna	None	Devendra Vijay Singh	Independent
Laundi	None	Vidyavati Chaturvedi	Indian National Congress
Chhatarpur	SC	Govind Das	Indian National Congress
Chhatarpur	SC	Dasrath	Indian National Congress
Bijawar	SC	Gayatri Devi	Indian National Congress
Bijawar	SC	Hansraj	Indian National Congress
Tikamgarh	None	Ram Krishna	Indian National Congress
Jatara	None	Kamta Prasad	Indian National Congress
Niwari	SC	Lakshmi Narayan	Praja Socialist Party
Niwari	SC	Nathu Ram	Indian National Congress
Seondha	None	Kamta Prasad Sharma	Indian National Congress
Datia	None	Shyam Sunder Dass Shyam	Indian National Congress
Jaora	None	Bankatelal Todi	Indian National Congress
Alot	SC	Lila Devi Choudhary	Indian National Congress
Manasa	None	Surajbhai Tugnawat	Indian National Congress
Garoth	None	Kasturchand Chaudhary	Indian National Congress
Suwasara	SC	Ramgopal Bhartiya	Indian National Congress
Sitamau	None	Dhansukhlal Bhachawat	Indian National Congress
Mandsaur	None	Shyam Sunder Patidar	Indian National Congress
Neemuch	None	Raghunandan Prasad	Indian National Congress
Jawad	None	Kanhiyalal Nagauri	Indian National Congress

== See also ==
- 1957 elections in India
- 1952 Madhya Pradesh Legislative Assembly election
- 1952 Madhya Bharat Legislative Assembly election
- 1952 Bhopal Legislative Assembly election
- 1952 Vindhya Pradesh Legislative Assembly election
