= Kota, Chhattisgarh Assembly constituency =

Legislative Assembly constituency in Chhattisgarh State, India

Coordinates: 22.29°N 82.02°E

Kota
- Constituency No. 25 for the Chhattisgarh Legislative Assembly

Constituency details
- Country: India
- Region: Central India
- State: Chhattisgarh
- District: Bilaspur
- Lok Sabha constituency: Bilaspur
- Established: 2003
- Total electors: 219,070
- Reservation: None

Member of Legislative Assembly
- 6th Chhattisgarh Legislative Assembly
- Incumbent Atal Shrivastava
- Party: Indian National Congress
- Elected year: 2023
- Preceded by: Renu Jogi

Kota is one of the 90 Legislative Assembly constituencies of Chhattisgarh state in India.

It comprises parts of Kota tehsil and Pendra Road tehsil, split between Bilaspur and Gaurela-Pendra-Marwahi districts.

== Members of the Legislative Assembly ==
Election	Name	Party	Note
Madhya Pradesh Legislative Assembly
1952	Kashiram Tiwari	Indian National Congress	
1957	Kashiram Tiwari	Indian National Congress	
1957	Suraj Kunwar	Indian National Congress	Constituency elected both general and ST candidates
1962	Lal Chandrasekhar Singh	Indian National Congress	
1967	Mathura Prasad Dubey	Indian National Congress	
1972	Mathura Prasad Dubey	Indian National Congress	
1977	Mathura Prasad Dubey	Indian National Congress	
1980	Mathura Prasad Dubey	Indian National Congress	
1985	Rajendra Prasad Shukla	Indian National Congress	
1990	Rajendra Prasad Shukla	Indian National Congress	
1993	Rajendra Prasad Shukla	Indian National Congress	
1998	Rajendra Prasad Shukla	Indian National Congress	
Chhattisgarh Legislative Assembly
2003	Rajendra Prasad Shukla	Indian National Congress	
2008	Renu Jogi	Indian National Congress	
2013	Renu Jogi	Indian National Congress	
2018	Renu Jogi	Janta Congress Chhattisgarh	
2023	Atal Shrivastava	Indian National Congress	

== Election results ==
=== 2023 ===
Chhattisgarh Legislative Assembly Election, 2023: Kota
Party	Candidate	Votes	%	±%
INC	Atal Shrivastava	73,479	44.95	+24.27
BJP	Pratap Singh Judev	65,522	40.08	+9.34
JCC	Renu Jogi	8,884	5.43	−27.34
GGP	Nand Kishore Raj	4,725	2.89	−2.59
AAP	Pankaj James	2,163	1.32	−2.01
NOTA	None of the Above	3,192	1.95	−0.70
Majority		7,957	4.87	+2.84
Turnout		163473	74.62	−0.32
INC gain from JCC		Swing		

=== 2018 ===
Chhattisgarh Legislative Assembly Election, 2018: Kota
Party	Candidate	Votes	%	±%
JCC	Renu Jogi	48,800	32.77	
BJP	Kashi Ram Sahu	45,774	30.74	
INC	Vibhor Singh	30,803	20.68	
GGP	Balaram Armo	8,163	5.48	
AAP	Harish Chandel	4,953	3.33	New
Rashtriya Gondwana Party	Dr. Urmila Singh Marko	1,590	1.07	
NOTA	None of the Above	3,942	2.65	
Majority		3,026	2.03	
Turnout		148,929	74.94	

== See also ==
- List of constituencies of the Chhattisgarh Legislative Assembly
- Bilaspur district
