= Bhandari (disambiguation) =

Bhandari or Bhandary is a surname.

Bhandari or bhandary may also refer to:

- Bhandari (caste), a caste in western India
- Barika (caste) or Bhandari, a caste of Odisha, India
- Bhandari (politician), Indian politician
- Bhandari, Osmanabad, a village in Osmanabad, Maharashtra, India
- Bhandary, a cook in a lascar ship's crew

== See also ==
- Bhandara (disambiguation)
