= Vidyashankar =

Vidyashankar is a surname. Notable people with the surname include:

- Aneesh Vidyashankar, Indian violinist
- Vidyawati Vidyashankar, Indian politician
