= Aneesh =

Aneesh is an Indian name. Notable people with the name include:

- Aneesh Anwar, Indian filmmaker
- Aneesh Chaganty, American film director
- Aneesh Chopra, former Chief Technology Officer of the United States
- Aneesh G. Menon, Indian actor
- Aneesh Gopal, Indian actor
- Aneesh Kapil, English cricketer
- Aneesh Raman, vice president of LinkedIn
- Aneesh Ravi, Indian actor
- Aneesh Sheth, Indian-American actress and activist
- Aneesh Upasana, Indian film director
- Aneesh Varma, British-American inventor
- Aneesh Vidyashankar, Indian musician
