= Vasantrao =

Vasantrao may refer to:

== People ==
- Vasantrao Balwantrao Chavan, Indian politician
- Vasantrao S. Dempo (1916–2000), Indian industrialist
- Vasantrao Deshpande (1920–1983), Hindustani classical vocalist
- Vasantrao Ghatge 1916–1986), Indian entrepreneur
- Vasantrao Gite, Indian politician
- Vasantrao More (born 1947), Indian politician
- Vasantrao Naik (1913–1979), Indian politician
- Vasantrao Patil (1917–1989), Indian politician
- Vasantrao Uike, Indian politician
- Vikram Vasantrao Kale, Indian politician
- Ranjit Vasantrao More (born 1959), Indian judge
- Amarsinh Vasanthrao Patil (born 1960), Indian politician
- Harshwardhan Vasantrao Sapkal, Indian politician

== Other uses ==
- Vasantrao Naik Government Institute of Arts and Social Sciences, college in India
- Vasantrao Naik Mahavidyalaya, Aurangabad, college in India
- Vasantrao Naik Marathwada Krishi Vidyapeeth, college in India
- Third Vasantrao Naik ministry
