= Khandwa Assembly constituency =

Constituency of the Madhya Pradesh legislative assembly in India

Coordinates: 21.82°N 76.35°E

Khandwa
- Constituency No. 177 for the Madhya Pradesh Legislative Assembly

Constituency details
- Country: India
- Region: Central India
- State: Madhya Pradesh
- District: Khandwa
- Lok Sabha constituency: Khandwa
- Established: 1951
- Reservation: SC

Member of Legislative Assembly
- 16th Madhya Pradesh Legislative Assembly
- Incumbent Kanchan Mukesh Tanve
- Party: Bharatiya Janata Party
- Elected year: 2023
- Preceded by: Devendra Verma

Khandwa is one of the 230 constituencies in the Madhya Pradesh Legislative Assembly of Madhya Pradesh a central state of India. It is also part of Khandwa Lok Sabha constituency and is a reserved seat for the Scheduled castes (SC).

The main battle is expected to be between the two time incumbent MLA Shri. Devendra Verma of BJP and Shri. Kundan Malviya of the Indian National Congress. The BJP has been winning since 1990.

== Members of the Legislative Assembly ==
Election	Name	Party
1952	Bhagwantrao Mandloi	Indian National Congress
1957	Deokaran Balchand	Indian National Congress
1957	Bhagwantrao Mandloi	Indian National Congress
1962	Bhagwantrao Mandloi	Indian National Congress
1967	Krishnarao	Bharatiya Jan Sangh
1972	Gangacharan Mishra	Indian National Congress
1977	Govind Prasad Gite	Janata Party
1980	Gangacharan Mishra	Indian National Congress (Indira)
1985	Nanda Mandloi	Indian National Congress
1990	Hukum Chand Yadav	Bharatiya Janata Party
1993	Puranmal Sharma	Bharatiya Janata Party
1998	Hukum Chand Yadav	Bharatiya Janata Party
2003	Hukum Chand Yadav	Bharatiya Janata Party
2008	Devendra Verma	Bharatiya Janata Party
2013	Devendra Verma	Bharatiya Janata Party
2018	Devendra Verma	Bharatiya Janata Party
2023	Kanchan Mukesh Tanve	Bharatiya Janata Party

== Election results ==
=== 2023 ===
2023 Madhya Pradesh Legislative Assembly election: Khandwa
Party	Candidate	Votes	%	±%
BJP	Kanchan Mukesh Tanve	109,067	59.19	+13.71
INC	Kundan Malviya	71,018	38.54	+4.34
NOTA	None of the above	1,876	1.02	−0.5
Majority		38,049	20.65	+9.37
Turnout		184,275	67.67	−1.1
BJP hold		Swing		

=== 2018 ===
2018 Madhya Pradesh Legislative Assembly election: Khandwa
Party	Candidate	Votes	%	±%
BJP	Devendra Verma	77,123	45.48	
INC	Kundan Malviya	57,986	34.2	
Independent	Kaushal Mehra	26,492	15.62	
Independent	Bhaiyya Rajkumar Kaithvas	2,207	1.3	
NOTA	None of the above	2,581	1.52	
Majority		19,137	11.28	
Turnout		169,558	68.77	
BJP hold		Swing		

=== 2013 ===
2013 Madhya Pradesh Legislative Assembly election: Khandwa
Party	Candidate	Votes	%	±%
BJP	Devendra Verma	89,074	58.92	
INC	Mohan Dhakase	55,003	36.39	
NOTA	None of the Above	4,314	2.85	
BSP	Dinesh Rathore	2,778	1.84	
Majority		34,071	23.20	
Turnout		1,51,635	66.27	
BJP hold		Swing		

=== 1998 ===
1998 Madhya Pradesh Legislative Assembly election: Khandwa
Party	Candidate	Votes	%	±%
BJP	Hukumchand Durgaprasad Yadav	31,890	44.30	
INC	Awadhesh Manohar Singh Sisodiya	31,819	44.20	
Independent	Virendra Mishra (Balli Bhaiya)	7,879	10.94	
SAP	Sheikh Shakil Sheikh Munshi	404	0.56	
Majority		71	0.10	
Turnout		71,992	51.89	
BJP hold		Swing		

== See also ==
- Khandwa
- List of constituencies of Madhya Pradesh Legislative Assembly
- Khandwa
