= Devendra Verma =

Indian politician

- Incumbent
- Assumed office November 2008
- Preceded by: Shri. Hukum Chand Yadav

Personal details
- Born: 10 April 1975 (age 50) Khandwa
- Party: Bhartiya Janata Party
- Spouse: Mamta Verma
- Children: 2
- Occupation: Politician, social worker

Devendra Verma is an Indian politician. He belongs to the Bhartiya Janta Party and has represented the Khandwa constituency since 2008 in the Madhya Pradesh Legislative Assembly. His father, Kishorilal Verma, was the state's Education Minister in the BJP government in the 1990s and represented the Pandhana constituency. Devendra Verma won the 2018 election with a margin of 19,137 votes.
