= Vidyawati =

Vidyawati is a given name. Notable people with the given name include:

- Vidyawati Chaturvedi (1926–2009), Indian politician
- Vidyawati Vidyashankar, Indian politician
