= Ghatge =

Ghatge is a surname. People with the surname include:

- Sagarika Ghatge
- Vijayendra Ghatge
- Yashwantrao Jaisingrao Ghatge
- Vasantrao Ghatge
