= Kanchan Mukesh Tanve =

Indian politician

Member of the Madhya Pradesh Legislative Assembly
- Incumbent
- Assumed office 2023
- Constituency: Khandwa

Personal details
- Party: Bhartiya Janta Party
- Occupation: Politician

Kanchan Mukesh Tanve (born 1982) is an Indian politician from Madhya Pradesh. She is a member of the Madhya Pradesh Legislative Assembly representing the Bharatiya Janata Party from Khandwa Assembly constituency, which is reserved for SC community in Khandwa district. She won the 2023 Madhya Pradesh Legislative Assembly election.

== Early life and education ==
Tanve is from Khandwa. She studied up to Class 12. She is a housewife and social worker.

== Career ==
Tanve was elected as MLA representing Bharatiya Janata Party for the first time in 2023. She won the 2023 Madhya Pradesh Legislative Assembly election from Khandwa Assembly constituency defeating Kundan Malviya of Indian National Congress by a margin of 38,049 votes. She is one of the two MLAs with lowest assets in Madhya Pradesh Assembly as per the affidavits filed with the Election Commission of India.
