= Government Medical College, Khandwa =

Nandkumar Singh Chauhan Government Medical College
- Type: Medical college and Hospital
- Established: 2018; 8 years ago
- Academic affiliations: Madhya Pradesh Medical Science University
- Dean: Dr. Sanjay K. Dadu
- Location: Khandwa, Madhya Pradesh, India; 21.847°N 76.350°E
- Website: www.gmckhandwa.org

Nandkumar Singh Chauhan Government Medical College, Khandwa is a full-fledged tertiary medical college in Khandwa, Madhya Pradesh. It was established in 2018. The college imparts the degree of Bachelor of Medicine and Surgery (MBBS). Nursing and para-medical courses are also offered. The college is affiliated to Madhya Pradesh Medical Science University and is recognized by National Medical Commission. The selection to the college is done on the basis of merit through National Eligibility and Entrance Test.

It was renamed after Late. Shri Nandkumar Singh Chauhan (MP Khandwa Lok Sabha) in August 2021.

== Courses ==
Government Medical College, Khandwa undertakes the education and training of students' MBBS courses.
