= Bhandara =

Bhandara may refer to:

== Places ==
- Bhandara, India
  - Bhandara district
  - Bhandara taluka
  - Bhandara Assembly constituency
  - Bhandara Lok Sabha constituency
- Bhandara, Nepal

== Other uses ==
- Bhandara (Hinduism), a free community meal
- Bhandara (leafhopper), a genus of leafhoppers

== See also ==
- Bhandari (disambiguation)
- Isphanyar M. Bhandara
- Bhandra block, in Jharkhand, India
