= Ambika Sao =

Indian politician

Member of the Madhya Pradesh Legislative Assembly
- In office 1957–1962 Serving with Ramlal Ghasia
- Preceded by: Ramgopal Tiwari, Anjoredas
- Succeeded by: Mool Chand
- Constituency: Mungeli

Personal details
- Party: Akhil Bharatiya Ram Rajya Parishad

Ambika Sao was an Indian politician from the state of the Madhya Pradesh. She represented Mungeli Vidhan Sabha constituency of undivided Madhya Pradesh Legislative Assembly by winning the 1957 Madhya Pradesh Legislative Assembly election.
