= Dada Darbar (Khandwa) =

Religion
- Affiliation: Hinduism
- District: Khandwa

Location
- Location: Khandwa
- State: Madhya Pradesh
- Country: India
- Interactive map of Dada Darbar
- Coordinates: 21°49′7″N 76°20′1″E

Website
- http://www.shridadadarbar.com/

Dada Darbar is a Hindu Temple in Khandwa, Nimar region, Madhya Pradesh, India. It is named after Dadaji Dhuniwale.

Dada Darbar is built at the memorial place of Dadaji Dhuniwale. There are innumerable devotees of 'Dadaji' in India. There are twenty-seven Dham's in India and abroad in the name of Dadaji Dhuniwale. Shri 1008 Keshwanand Ji Maharaj (Bade Dadaji) was an Avadhoot saint – meaning one who is completely pure and absorbed in the supreme consciousness.

His exact birth details are unknown. He arrived in Khandwa from Barwaha in 1930 and attained Mahasamadhi on 3 December 1930.

Shri Bade Dadaji Maharaj sanctified this land through his Samadhi, and his divine miracles remain unfathomable. Millions of devotees across the world continue to experience spiritual joy under his divine presence and guidance.
