= Bhagwantrao Mandloi =

2nd Chief Minister of Madhya Pradesh

Bhagwantrao Annabhau Mandloi

2nd Chief Minister of Madhya Pradesh
- In office 1 January 1957 – 30 January 1957
- Preceded by: Ravishankar Shukla
- Succeeded by: Kailash Nath Katju
- In office 12 March 1962 – 29 September 1963
- Preceded by: Kailash Nath Katju
- Succeeded by: Dwarka Prasad Mishra

Member of the Madhya Pradesh Legislative Assembly
- In office 1957–1967

Personal details
- Born: 15 December 1892 Khandwa, Central Provinces, British India (present-day Madhya Pradesh, India)
- Died: 3 November 1977 (aged 84)
- Party: Indian National Congress
- Education: B.A.LLB
- As of 1 June, 2017 Source: ["Profile - Bhagwantrao Mandloi". Madhya Pradesh Vidhan Sabha.]

Bhagwantrao Annabhau Mandloi (15 December 1892 - 3 November 1977), an Indian National Congress politician was a former Chief Minister of Madhya Pradesh. He was born in Khandwa. He was a recipient of the civilian honour of Padma Bhushan.

He was the chief minister of the state twice; from 1 January 1957 to 30 January 1957 and 12 March 1962 to 29 September 1963. He represented Khandwa Vidhan Sabha constituency of undivided Madhya Pradesh Legislative Assembly by winning General election of 1957.
