= Renu Jogi =

Indian politician

Dr. Renu Jogi

Member of Chhattisgarh Legislative Assembly
- In office 2006–2023
- Preceded by: Rajendra Prasad Shukla
- Succeeded by: Atal Shrivastava
- Constituency: Kota

Personal details
- Born: October 27, 1950 (age 75)
- Party: Janta Congress Chhattisgarh
- Other political affiliations: Indian National Congress (till 2018)
- Spouse: Ajit Jogi
- Children: Amit Jogi
- Education: MBBS; MS
- Alma mater: Christian Medical College, Vellore; Devi Ahilya University, Indore

Dr. Renu Jogi (born 27 October 1950) is an Indian politician. She was elected to the Chhattisgarh Legislative Assembly from Kota in the 2018 Chhattisgarh Legislative Assembly election as a member of the Janta Congress Chhattisgarh. She is wife of 1st Chief Minister of Chhattisgarh Ajit Jogi.
