= J.P.L. Francis =

Indian politician

Member of the Madhya Pradesh Legislative Assembly
- In office 1957–1962
- Succeeded by: Eknath
- Constituency: Rajnandgaon

Personal details
- Born: c.1922
- Died: 2013; Rajnandgaon, India

J.P.L. Francis (c. 1922 – 2013) was an Indian politician from Madhya Pradesh. He represented Rajnandgaon constituency of the undivided Madhya Pradesh Legislative Assembly, by winning the 1957 Madhya Pradesh Legislative Assembly election.

Francis died in 2013 at the age of 91.
