= Atal Shrivastava =

Indian politician

Member of Chhattisgarh Legislative Assembly
- Incumbent
- Assumed office 2023
- Preceded by: Renu Jogi
- Constituency: Kota

Personal details
- Political party: Indian National Congress

Atal Shrivastava (born 1968) is an Indian politician from Chhattisgarh. He is an MLA from Kota Assembly constituency, in Gaurela Pendra Marwahi district. He won the 2023 Chhattisgarh Legislative Assembly election, representing the Indian National Congress.

== Early life and education ==
Shrivastava is from Bilaspur, Chhattisgarh. He is the son of late J.P Shrivastav. He completed his bachelor's degree in Engineering in 1989 at M.I.T College, Gondiya, Nagpur University.

== Career ==
Shrivastava won from Kota Assembly constituency, representing Indian National Congress in the 2023 Chhattisgarh Legislative Assembly election. He polled 73,479 votes and defeated his nearest rival, Prabal Pratap Singh Judev of the Bharatiya Janata Party, by a margin of 7,957 votes.

Six candidates from the Royal families, including interim deputy chief minister T. S. Singhdeo, the present Maharaja of erstwhile Surguja state, contested the elections, but all of them lost. The Jashpur Royal family candidate, Prabal Pratap Singh Judeo, son of former union minister Dilip Singh Judeo, contested from Kota on the BJP ticket, but lost to Shrivastava, by a margin of 7957 votes.
