= Khandwa Airport =

- IATA: none; ICAO: VAKD

Summary
- Airport type: Public
- Operator: Airport Authority of India
- Location: Khandwa, Madhya Pradesh, India
- Elevation AMSL: 334 m / 1,096 ft
- Coordinates: 21°51′26″N 076°20′09″E

Map
- Location in Madhya Pradesh VAKD (India)

Runways
Direction	Length		Surface
Direction	m	ft	Surface
10/28	891	2,920

Khandwa Airport (ICAO: VAKD) is a public airport located on Nagchun Road, 3 km north-west of the town of Khandwa in Madhya Pradesh, India. It does not have any scheduled flights.
