= Mungeli Assembly constituency =

Legislative Assembly constituency in Chhattisgarh State, India

Coordinates: 22.07°N 81.69°E

Mungeli
- Constituency No. 27 for the Chhattisgarh Legislative Assembly

Constituency details
- Country: India
- Region: Central India
- State: Chhattisgarh
- District: Mungeli
- Lok Sabha constituency: Bilaspur
- Established: 1951
- Total electors: 253,778
- Reservation: SC

Member of Legislative Assembly
- 6th Chhattisgarh Legislative Assembly
- Incumbent Punnulal Mohle
- Party: Bharatiya Janata Party
- Elected year: 2023

Mungeli is one of the 90 Legislative Assembly constituencies of Chhattisgarh state in India. It is in Mungeli district and is reserved for candidates belonging to the Scheduled Castes. It is also part of Bilaspur Lok Sabha constituency.

Previously, Mungeli was part of Madhya Pradesh Legislative Assembly until the state of Chhattisgarh was created in 2000.

== Members of Legislative Assembly ==
Year	Member	Party
Madhya Pradesh Legislative Assembly
1952	Ramgopal Tiwari	Indian National Congress
1952	Anjoredas	Indian National Congress
1957	Ramlal Ghasia	Akhil Bharatiya Ram Rajya Parishad
1957	Ambika Sao	Akhil Bharatiya Ram Rajya Parishad
1962	Mool Chand	Indian National Congress
1967	Ganeshram Anant	Indian National Congress
1972	Ganeshram Anant	Indian National Congress
1977	Rameshwar Prasad Kosaria	Janata Party
1980	Khelendass	Indian National Congress
1985	Durgawati	Indian National Congress
1990	Khem Singh Barmate	Bharatiya Janata Party
1993	Khem Singh Barmate	Bharatiya Janata Party
1998	Vikram Mohale	Bharatiya Janata Party
Chhattisgarh Legislative Assembly
2003	Chandrabhan	Indian National Congress
2008	Punnulal Mohle	Bharatiya Janata Party
2013	Punnulal Mohle	Bharatiya Janata Party
2018	Punnulal Mohle	Bharatiya Janata Party
2023	Punnulal Mohle	Bharatiya Janata Party

== Election results ==
=== 2023 ===
Chhattisgarh Legislative Assembly Election, 2023: Mungeli
Party	Candidate	Votes	%	±%
BJP	Punnulal Mohle	85,429	49.72	+11.44
INC	Sanjeet Banarjee	73,648	42.86	+9.95
BSP	Samaru Bhaksar	2,705	1.57	New
AAP	Deepak Patre	2,080	1.21	+0.55
NOTA	None of the Above	1,252	0.73	−1.26
Majority		11,781	6.86	+1.49
Turnout		171821	67.71	−2.03
BJP hold		Swing		

=== 2018 ===
Chhattisgarh Legislative Assembly Election, 2018: Mungeli
Party	Candidate	Votes	%	±%
BJP	Punnulal Mohle	60,469	38.28	
INC	Rakesh Patre	51,982	32.91	
JCC	Chandrabhan Barmate	32,257	20.42	
Independent	Govind Nat	2,797	1.77	
NOTA	None of the Above	3,150	1.99	
Majority		8,487	5.37	
Turnout		157,966	69.74	
BJP hold		Swing		

== See also ==
- Mungeli district
- Mungeli
- List of constituencies of Chhattisgarh Legislative Assembly
