= Haribhajan Singh =

Indian politician

Haribhajan Singh was an Indian politician from the state of the Madhya Pradesh. He represented the Sitapur Vidhan Sabha constituency of the Madhya Pradesh Legislative Assembly by winning the General election of 1957.
