= Ramakant Khode =

Indian politician

Member of the Madhya Pradesh Legislative Assembly for Khargone Vidhan Sabha
- Incumbent
- Assumed office 1957

Ramakant Khode was an Indian politician from the state of the Madhya Pradesh. He represented Khargone Vidhan Sabha constituency in Madhya Pradesh Legislative Assembly by winning General election of 1957.
