= Uchgaon =

Census town in Maharashtra, India Times of Unchgaon

- Census town
- Location in Maharashtra, India
- Coordinates: 16.6988°N 74.2749°E
- Country: India
- State: Maharashtra
- District: Kolhapur

Population (2011)
  - Total: 31,238

Languages
  - Official: Marathi
- Time zone: UTC+5:30 (IST)
- Postal code: 416005
- Website: www.gpuchgaon.in

Uchgaon is a census town in Kolhapur district in the state of Maharashtra, India. Unchgaon is a village adjacent to Kolhapur. It is covered by village Mudshingi at its east, Gandhinagar at its north east, Shiroli at north, Sarnobatwadi at its south.

== Demographics ==
As of 2001 India census, Uchgaon had a population of 22,581. Males constitute 53% of the population and females 47%. Uchgaon has an average literacy rate of 71%, higher than the national average of 59.5%: male literacy is 77%, and female literacy is 65%. In Uchgaon, 14% of the population is under 6 years of age.
