= Bhandari, Osmanabad =

Village in Maharashtra

Coordinates: 26°17′N 94°09′E

Bhandari
- Village
- Interactive map of Bhandari
- Country: India
- State: Maharashtra

Bhandari is a village in Osmanabad Taluka in Osmanabad District in Maharashtra State, India.
