= Nokhelal =

Indian politician

Nokhelal Daheriya was an Indian politician from the state of the Madhya Pradesh. He represented Chhindwara Vidhan Sabha constituency of undivided Madhya Pradesh Legislative Assembly by winning General election of 1957.
