= Motiram Odgoo =

Indian politician

Motiram Odgoo was an Indian politician from the state of the Madhya Pradesh. He represented Kiranpur Vidhan Sabha constituency of undivided Madhya Pradesh Legislative Assembly by winning General election of 1957.
