= Shankar Lal Tiwari =

Indian politician and freedom fighter

Shankar lal Tiwari was an Indian politician and freedom fighter from the state of the Madhya Pradesh. He represented Khairlanjee Vidhan Sabha constituency of undivided Madhya Pradesh Legislative Assembly by winning General election of 1957.
