= Kanak Kumari =

Indian politician

Kanak Kumari was an Indian politician from the state of Madhya Pradesh. She represented Chowki Vidhan Sabha constituency of undivided Madhya Pradesh Legislative Assembly by winning General election of 1957.
