= Deokaran Balchand =

Indian politician

Deokaran Balchand was an Indian politician from the state of the Madhya Pradesh. He represented Khandwa Vidhan Sabha constituency of undivided Madhya Pradesh Legislative Assembly by winning General election of 1957.
