= Rajkumari Surajkala =

Indian politician

Member of the Madhya Pradesh Legislative Assembly for Budhni Vidhan Sabha
- Incumbent
- Assumed office 1957

Rajkumari Surajkala was an Indian politician from the state of the Madhya Pradesh. She represented Budhni Vidhan Sabha constituency in Madhya Pradesh Legislative Assembly by winning General election of 1957.
