= Shankar Lal Garg =

Indian politician

Shankar Lal Garg was an Indian politician from the state of the Madhya Pradesh. He represented Sardarpur Vidhan Sabha constituency of Madhya Pradesh Legislative Assembly by winning General election of 1957.
