= Kapildeo Narayan Singh =

Indian politician

Kapildeo Narayan Singh was an Indian politician from the state of the Madhya Pradesh. He represented Pal Vidhan Sabha constituency of undivided Madhya Pradesh Legislative Assembly by winning General election of 1957.
