= Sadhav Sitaram =

Indian politician

Member of the Madhya Pradesh Legislative Assembly for Maheshwar Vidhan Sabha

Sadhav Sitaram was an Indian politician from the state of the Madhya Pradesh. He represented Maheshwar Vidhan Sabha constituency in Madhya Pradesh Legislative Assembly by winning General election of 1957.
