= Barika (caste) =

Barik caste of Odisha, India

The Barika or Bhandari or Barik (also known as Baja, Nai, Napita in different area) is an Indian caste from Odisha State in India. Traditionally they are barbers by profession. Their service is indispensable on the occasion of marriage, birth and death. They are also required for carrying luggage bags of bride and groom in Hindu weddings.

== Social status ==
The Barika (Bhandaris) are included in Other Backward Classes in Odisha.

This is in the Central list of OBCs for the state of Odisha with Entry No-10 vide resolution No-12011/9/94-BCC dated 19/10/1994.
