= Vallabhdas Sitaram =

Indian politician

Vallabhdas Sitaram Mahajan was an Indian politician and advocate from the state of the Madhya Pradesh. He represented Maheshwar Vidhan Sabha constituency in Madhya Pradesh Legislative Assembly by winning in the 1957 Indian general election.
