= Kurray Pritam =

Indian politician

Kurray Pritam was an Indian politician from the state of the Madhya Pradesh. He represented Ambikapur Vidhan Sabha constituency of undivided Madhya Pradesh Legislative Assembly by winning General election of 1957.
