= Vasantrao Ghatge =

Indian businessman (1916–1986)

Vasantrao Madhavrao Ghatge Patil
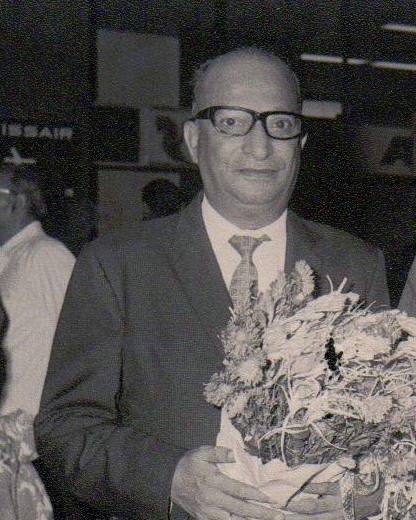
- Born: 9 May 1916; Hasurchampu
- Died: 3 September 1986 (aged 70)
- Education: Master of Science in Botany
- Occupations: Founder, Business man
- Spouse: Pramila Galgali
- Children: 7

Vasantrao Madhavrao Ghatge Patil (9 May 1916 – 3 September 1986) was an Indian entrepreneur, business magnate, industrialist and a professor. He was the co-founder of Ghatge Patil Transports along with Jaykumar Patil in the year 1945 based in Kolhapur. Ghatge was widely recognized as the pioneer in the road transport sector for revolutionizing transportation of cargo or goods. He was born in Kolhapur to Radhabai and Madhavrao Ghatge. He was raised in Kolhapur in the 1920s and completed Master of Science in Botany in the year 1938 from Fergusson College of Pune.

During his lectureship at the Rajaram College of Kolhapur, he developed Tuberculosis and had to leave his position due to his prolonged treatment. After fighting TB, he along with his friend Mr. Jaykumar Patil started goods transportation in the year 1946 as Ghatge Patil Transports Ltd. Extensive reach of Ghatge Patil trucks in every corner of Maharashtra had made it a household name. Soon, the organization diversified to multiple industries like spare parts manufacturing unit named as KGP Auto Ltd. (Kirloskar Ghatge Patil Auto Ltd.), the top engine and automobile dealerships like Morris Motors, Lambretta under its wing during the 1950s. The customer service and sales service of Ghatge-Patil was popular in the industry which eventually gained the group more international dealership offers.

Ghatge tried his luck in manufacturing and produced an Auto Scooter named 'Laxmi Scooterette' with the support of the Kirloskar Group in 1972. He was a noted participant in the Deccan Association along with influencers like Vasantdad Patil, Yashwantrao Chavan.

In 1986, Ghatge succumbed to multiple health disorders and died on 3 September 1986.

After his demise, the Ghatge Group diversified in various verticals. Ghatge Patil Transports Pvt. Ltd. formed in 1958 is the flagship company. It completed 60 years in December 2017 and is currently under the leadership of the youngest grandson of the Ghatge family, Mr. Tushar Satish Ghatge.

== Background ==
=== Family ===
Ghatge belonged to a Deshastha Brahmin family of scholars.These belong to Ghatge Patil group. The Famous Maratha Ghatges are a different achiever breed altogether Madhavrao had studied Upanishads while his elder brother Amrutrao was an Indian Sanskrit scholar. Ghatge had three brothers and one sister, Ghatge being the youngest. Vishnupant had studied Aeronautics while Sakharam was a builder by profession. Born in a small village Hasurchampu in Gadhinglaj Taluka, the Ghatges are traditional Brahmins with strong roots in Kolhapur. Going back, six to seven generations, it is known that the Ghatges actually belonged to the Kulkarni community of Kolhapur. Madhavrao Venkatesh, father to Ghatge was born into the Vaishnav community of Kolhapur in 1886. Madhavrao and Radhabai had five children, the youngest being Vasantrao.

== Education and business ==
After finishing Master of Science in Botany from Fergusson College of Pune, Ghatge started his career as a professor in Rajaram College. After teaching for a few months, he had to resign his post when he was diagnosed with Tuberculosis. Ghatge, being calm and understanding by nature made friends very easily; one of his closest friends was Jaykumar Patil.

Jaykumar Patil belonged to a Jain family of Kolhapur. The Patil family ran a small goods transportation business which was dependent on a single truck and the route for which was a fixed Kolhapur-Mumbai trip. Many a times, Jaykumar Patil himself drove the truck all the way to Mumbai. Sakharampant, the elder brother of Ghatge was a civil engineer by profession had started with the construction business in Kolhapur. During 1941–42, Sakharam had bagged an Airport building contract which required regular goods transportation from Kolhapur to Belgaum. Sakharam had one truck to handle the transportation but had a shortage of one truck. Ghatge suggested Jaykumar what for the assignment to which Jaykumar agreed at once to help. After the completion of the assignment in 1943, Ghatge suggested to start a sole goods transport business using the two trucks and that is how Ghatge Patil Transports took birth and the partnership began. In 1945, during the reign of E.W Perry, the business bagged its first major contract of Rajaram Rifles to transport wood under the commandment of Gen. Thorat. With this contract, Ghatge & Patil had struck a gold mine and gained respect in town for handling the Indian Army consignments.

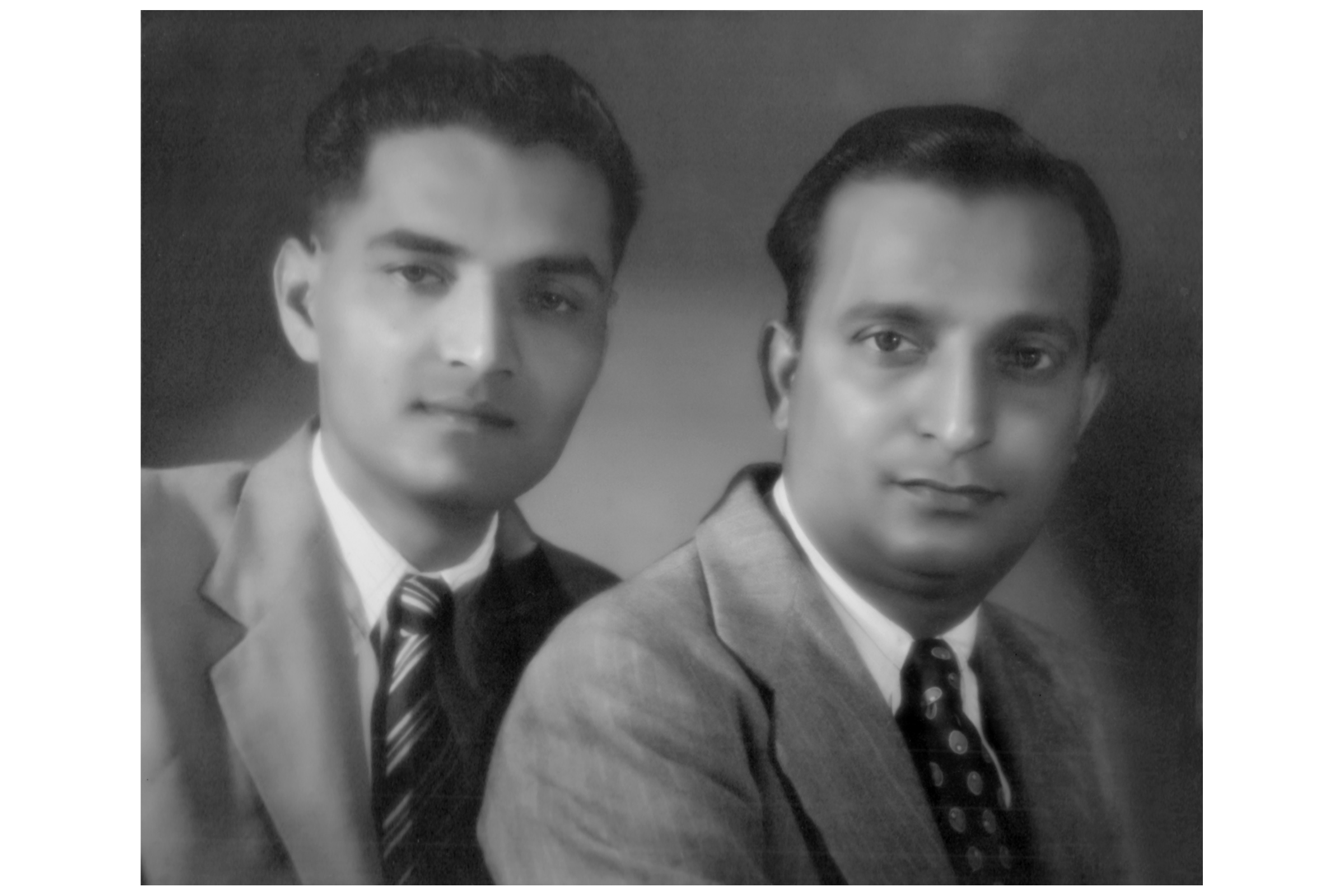
Ghatge with his friend & business partner Mr. Jaykumar Patil

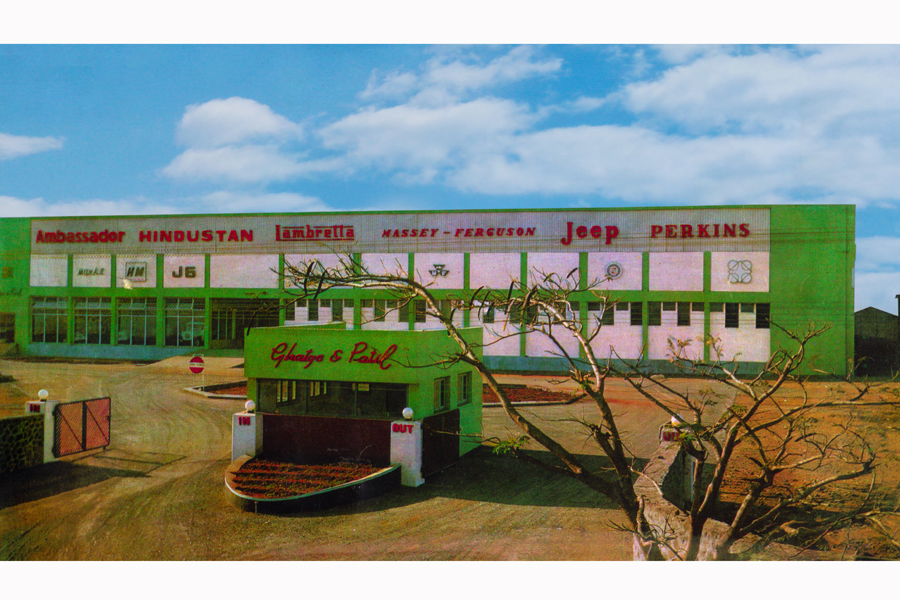
Ghatge & Patil Showroom in 1971

=== Diversification and dealerships ===
==== Spare parts ====
After the World-War II, the infrastructure and specifically roads were in ruins which directly affected vehicle transport and the motor components. Ghatge noticed a growing need of such replaceable components i.e. spare parts. He identified that if he made Spare parts available in Kolhapur, he can provide to numerous trucks in the town. He would take trips to the Royal Opera House (Mumbai) in Girgaon to would spare parts not just for his business but for creating a market place in Kolhapur. The Mumbai trips not only helped Ghatge to gain entry in the spare components market but he made acquaintances with the vendor and fellow transporters. Later, Ghatge explored the Truck & Body building business started by building variety of closed vans and ambulances but were remembered for building Kolhapur Police Vans and were applauded by the then Inspector G.P Khan Bahadur Sadari.

==== Motor and automotive components ====
Ghatge was soon eyeing the Motor or Automobile industry but it was not possible to buy or manufacture in India since every make was outsourced due to better available quality overseas. But in 1959, when Morris Motors company shut down its production, Ghatge was hopeful again. He visited the French Motor Car Co. who had the spare parts for one of Ghatge's trucks. Along with the spare parts, they also had the agency of Morris Motors. Ghatge & Patil, then held the agency of Morris Motors because of the sheer dedication and strong corporate relations of Ghatge in the Industry. Alongside, Ghatge also bagged the Morris Commercial trucks which gave India its first Diesel truck. With the help of G.P Khan of Kolhapur Police, Ghatge & Patil held the General Motors agency too.

Post World War, the small towns generated demands of motor vehicles and components, too. Initially the major distributors isolated the metropolitan cities for supplying their motor components but with the changing era they wished to distribute by giving agencies in the small towns like Kolhapur. Ghatge opened its first showroom at Rajaram Road, Kolhapur with a spacious display of motor equipments and multiple bays and workshops for repair work. Soon, all the verticals of Ghatge & Patil excelled and word spread that they are the top dealership house for automotive components, trucks etc. which brought numerous dealerships under their house.

==== Bicycle company ====
The Bicycle demand in the country was booming and Ghatge did not miss the opportunity. Raleigh Bicycle Company, one of the oldest bicycle manufacturing company in the world from England that goes by the brand name Raleigh had given its agency to the Sen & Pandit of Kolkatta. Ghatge & Patil took the Open general licence with the help of Mr. M. F. Vasvani who was the Manager of Raleigh and ordered the bicycles directly to Kolhapur that led to the sale of 300 lot of bicycles in a very short span. In 1952, when TI Cycles of India started its production of Hercules Cycles, Phillips Cycles and BSA motorcycles in Madras, Ghatge had it under his belt too.

In the small town of Kolhapur, the only ice factory shut followed by which Ghatge founded the Pearl Ice Factory to meet the demands of the people of his town.

In 1952, Ghatge- Patil shocked people with their decision to shut its flagship transport business. They eventually did not stand by it and changed the decision owing to the growing market needs of surface transportation and in 1954, Ghatge Patil Transports resumed its bookings.

==== Scooters and auto-rickshaw dealers ====
The growing popularity of Ghatge as the dynamic and social businessman brought multiple dealerships to the doorstep of Ghatge & Patil. The Italian company, Automobile Products of India, the manufacturer at Bombay in 1949, produced Lambretta scooters and autorickshaws & offered Ghatge & Patil to become the distributors of their products in 1956. They also bagged the dealership of Mahindra & Mahindra which started its production in India around 1954; Ghatge founded the dealership showrooms in Kolhapur, Ratnagiri, Satara and Solapur.

==== Tractors and Agricultural Equipments ====
Ghatge Patil held the Massey Ferguson agency in 1957, a major American manufacturer of Agricultural Equipments along with Tractors and Farm Equipment Limited TAFE in 1960.

=== Laxmi Scooterette ===
API, under the wing of M. A Chidambaram was granted the permission to manufacture two out of the three models of Lambretta by the Indian Government. After having all the major dealerships under his wing, Ghatge decided to manufacture the third model which was better known as an Auto Scooter. It was a big leap for the Ghatge-Patil and under the guidance of Kirloskars, the production of the model started in Uchgaon under KGP Auto Ltd. (Kirloskar Ghatge Patil Auto Ltd.) which was set up near Ghatge Patil Industries Foundry.which was named. The Auto Scooter was named as "Laxmi Scooterette" touching upon the emotions and connect better with the people. Kirloskar Kisaan, an oil company supplied Engines and Oagle Brother's Delstar supplied the body, fuel tank along with the front and rear fork assembly for Laxmi. Laxmi was released in the market during 1972 with a target to produce 24000 models by the year 1975. Unfortunately, Laxmi could not make a mark in the industry due to technical and market inefficiencies. Around four years after Vasantrao Ghatge's demise, the group saw the end of Laxmi Scooterette in 1990.

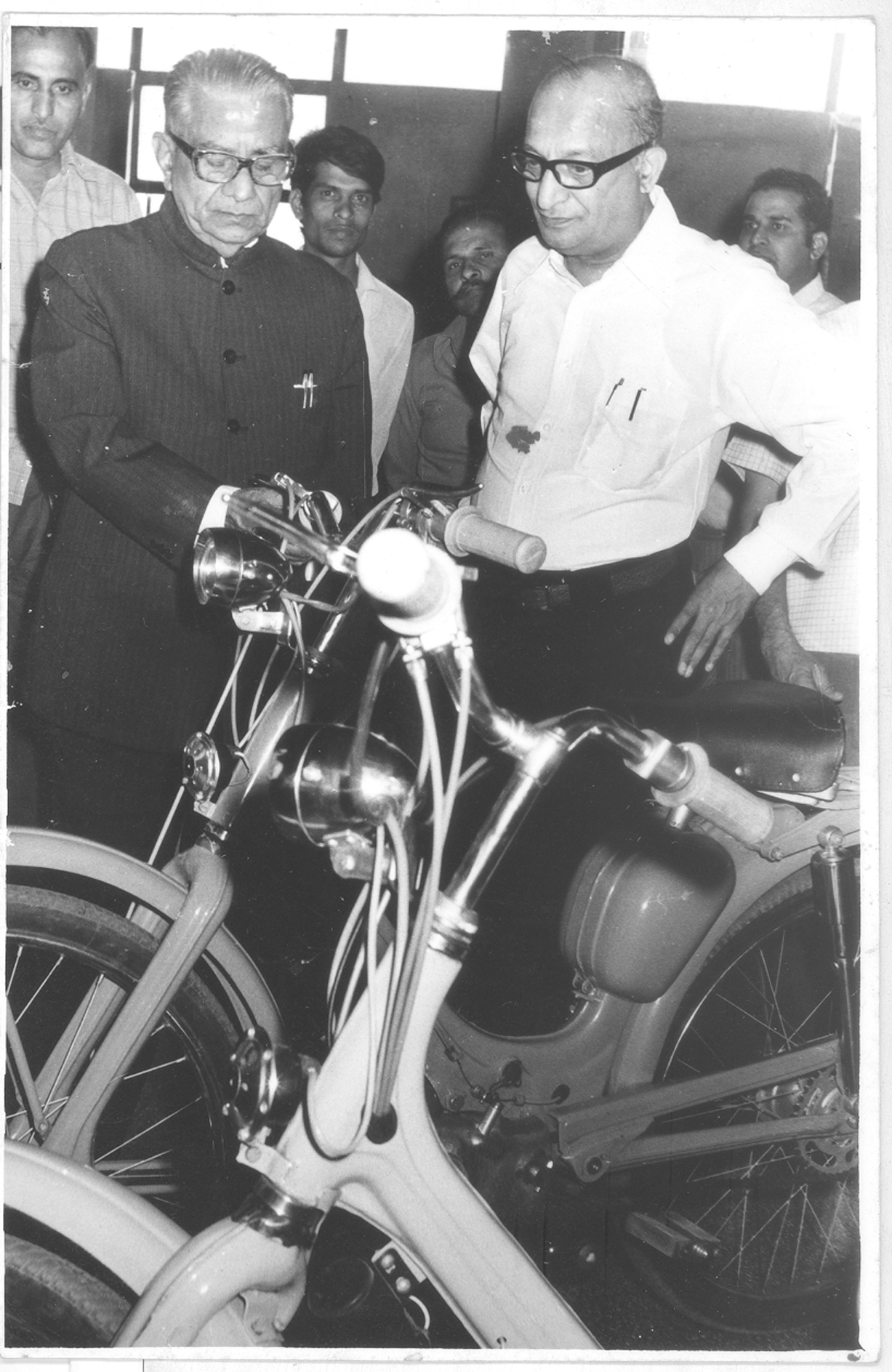
Laxmi 48 select, a Ghatge & Patil make shown to Abasaheb Garware by Ghatge

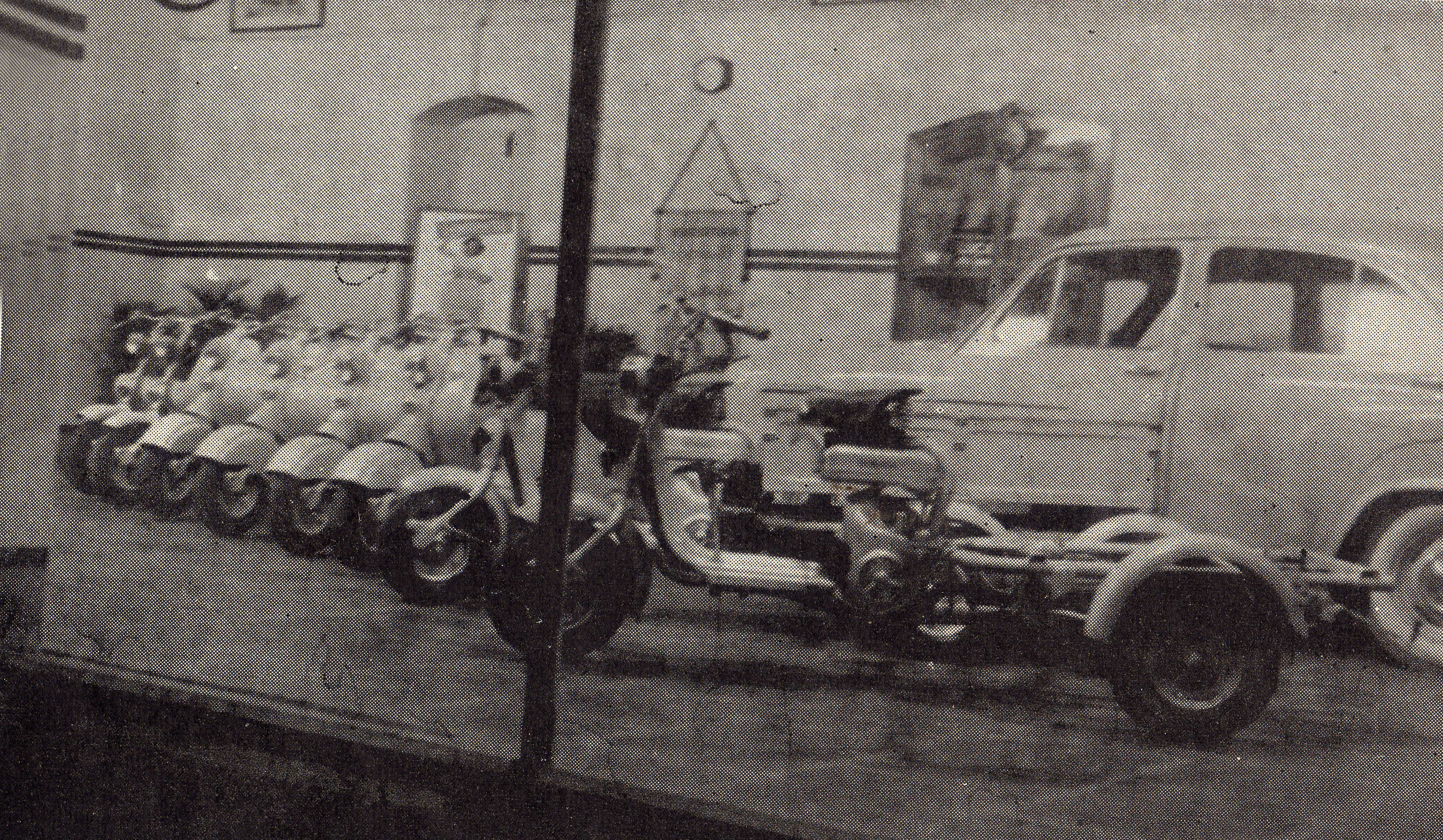
Commencement of Lambretta Scooter Sale by Ghatge & Patil started in 1956

== Philanthropy and social activities ==
In 1967, Ghatge along with Abasaheb Kulkarni Khebudkar from Sangli was a part of the Deccan Co-operative Spinning Mill Ltd. Although having little or no interest in politics, he soon made friends with noted politicians and influencers namely Vasantdada Patil, Yashwantrao Chavan and Vasantrao Naik who were active members of the Deccan Association.

He was the head of the New Education Society of Kolhapur in 1982 after Madan Mohan Lohiya. Ghatge started and supported 24 schools and 3 Junior colleges.

On 30 August 1949, Remand Home was established by Lalitadevi Najappa, wife to Chief Administrator Captain V. Najappa. In the next 2 years, Ghatge was heading the departments from funding allocation. A well-known Social activist, Dr. Sunilkumar Lawate was associated with the Remand Home which is now converted to Balkalyan Sankul and admitted 45 boys and 4 girls.

With a growing popularity and a huge social circle, Ghatge had notable visitors in Kolhapur. The Ganesh Festival, which was the most coveted and celebrated event in the organization had the most talented artists of India. Pandit Bhimsen Joshi had performed five times at the Ganesh Festival in Ghatge- Patil since 1955; the world-famous sitarist Ravi Shankar, the Indian Tabla player Alla Rakha and the classical singers Kishori Amonkar, Pandit Kumar Gandharva, Bal Gandharva, Pandit Vasantrao Deshpande
