= Padmavati Devi =

Indian politician

Rani Padmavati Devi was an Indian politician from Madhya Pradesh. She represented Birendranagar Vidhan Sabha constituency of undivided Madhya Pradesh Legislative Assembly by winning General election of 1957.
