= Harbhagat Singh =

Indian politician

Harbhagat Singh a.k.a. Than Singh was an Indian politician from the state of the Madhya Pradesh. He represented Sihora Vidhan Sabha constituency of undivided Madhya Pradesh Legislative Assembly by winning General election of 1957. He studied in Col. Brown Cambridge School and St. Stephen's College.
