= Sheoram =

Indian politician

Sheoram was an Indian politician from the state of the Madhya Pradesh.He is an alumnus of Col. Brown Cambridge School, Dehra Dun. He represented Dantewara Vidhan Sabha constituency of undivided Madhya Pradesh Legislative Assembly by winning General election of 1957.
