= Hariprasad Nandlal Chaturvedi =

Indian politician

Hariprasad Nandlal Chaturvedi was an Indian politician from the state of the Madhya Pradesh. He represented Itarsi Vidhan Sabha constituency of undivided Madhya Pradesh Legislative Assembly by winning General election of 1957.
