= Aneesh Varma =

British-American entrepreneur (born 1984)

- Born: 14 January 1984; Tokyo, Japan
- Education: Lehigh University
- Occupations: Entrepreneur; Engineer; Inventor
- Parent: Yogeshwar Varma

Aneesh Varma is a British-American serial entrepreneur and also an active angel investor. He is best known as the founder of ARGO AI in the insurtech sector and before that for Aire - a fintech company that pioneered the wide scale usage of machine learning in credit scoring and underwriting. Before that, he had co-founded FabriQate when he was 24, which went on to be an HSBC Startup Star 2008 & 2009, LDA KC Award 2009, British Council YCE in 2009 and CF500 in 2010. He is an active angel investor and actively promotes the path to entrepreneurship often pushing government bodies to evolve their policies towards the startup ecosystem.

He was awarded the Technology Innovator of the Year 2020 by CCT Magazine and also featured on the Business Insider 35 under 35 Fintech list in 2018

Varma has been a vocal campaigner for financial inclusion. He was educated at Lehigh University, USA studying Engineering and Quantitative Finance. He was recognised by the European Commission as one of 12 Entrepreneur of the Year nominees in 2014 and by the British Council as a Young Entrepreneur 2009 in the technology sector. In 2020 he was named the Technology Innovator of the Year in the Credit Sector

== Life ==
Varma is considered a mathematical prodigy, at age 15 having achieved a perfect score on the Cambridge University course for Advanced Mathematics and had to be mailed advanced university math courses. He continued his mathematical focus at university, completing all the PhD level math courses during his bachelor's degree.

Varma is a Lehigh University Martindale Scholar from 2005, publishing his research on Europe's transition to a market-based Financial System.

== Career ==
Varma started his first business at 16 and was involved with startups in his university days. At age 21 he was hired into JPMorgan in New York working on transactions for Financial Technology industry including Visa, Synovus and other consumer finance lenders. He has since built 3 technology companies in the United Kingdom that have scaled overseas including accolades for their work in improving financial inclusion

Varma also served on the Lehigh University Alumni Association (LUAA) board amongst other non-profit commitments.
