= Bhandari (politician) =

Indian politician

Member of the Legislative Assembly
- Incumbent
- Assumed office 1957
- Constituency: Pal

Bhandari was an Indian politician from the state of the Madhya Pradesh. He represented Pal Vidhan Sabha constituency of undivided Madhya Pradesh Legislative Assembly by winning General election of 1957.
