= Vasantrao Uike =

Indian politician

Vasantrao Uike was an Indian politician from the state of Madhya Pradesh. He represented Lakhnadon Vidhan Sabha constituency in the Madhya Pradesh Legislative Assembly from 1957 to 1962.
