= Kashiram Tiwari =

Indian politician

Kashiram Tiwari was an Indian politician from the state of the Madhya Pradesh. He represented Kota Vidhan Sabha constituency of undivided Madhya Pradesh Legislative Assembly by winning General election of 1957.
