= Aneesh Vidyashankar =

Indian violinist (born 1991)

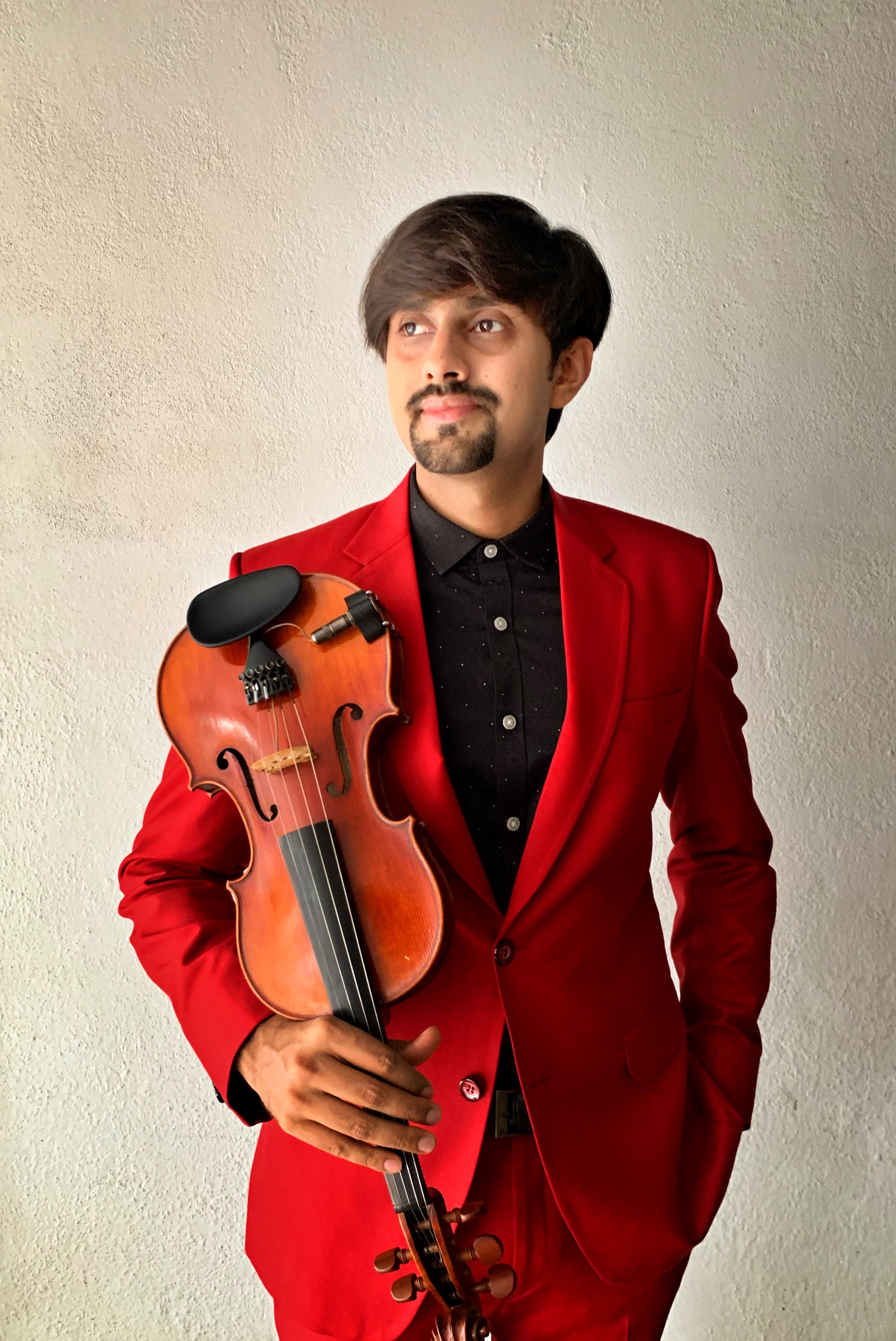

Background information
- Birth name: Aneesh Vidyashankar
- Born: 16 January; Bangalore, India
- Occupation(s): Violinist; Model; Architect; Walking violinist
- Years active: 1997–present

Aneesh Vidyashankar (born 16 January) is a violinist, composer and architect. He is best known as the "Walking Violinist". for his ability to walk and play fusion music on the violin, amidst the crowd. He was introduced to Carnatic Music at the age of three and was formally trained by his father S.R Vidyashankar, who hails from the Lalgudi Jayaraman school of violin playing. Aneesh was a child prodigy and gave his first solo violin performance on stage, when he was six years old.

He has scored background violin pieces for Kannada Movies Godhi Banna Sadharana Mykattu, Pushpaka Vimana, Kavaludaari, Popcorn Monkey Tiger with Charan Raj (composer)

In 2017 Aneesh received an honorary doctorate in music.

== Early life ==
Aneesh Vidyashankar was born in Bangalore, Karnataka to violinist S.R Vidyashankar and mother Jyothi Vidyashankar who is a singer. His formal training began at age three and his father has been responsible in promoting his music worldwide. Aneesh was introduced to western classical as well as other styles of music by his mother. He named his violin “Happy” at age three.

== Education ==
Aneesh received his primary education at The Valley School which comes under the J Krishnamurti foundation and then went on to do his PUC from Christ University. He completed his Bachelor Of Architecture from RV College of Architecture, Bangalore.

== Career ==
Aneesh initially performed instrumental solo carnatic music concerts in Bangalore and Chennai. He was one of the youngest solo violinists to perform at the Fort High School and Sheshadripuram Ramanavami Festival in Bangalore. In 2008 he released his first carnatic music album "Pure Experssions" In 2009 Aneesh started "fusion" music and performing for corporate companies In 2011 he started making music for social causes. In 2015 Aneesh gave his TEDx Talk and also performed for Dr A. P. J. Abdul Kalam. In 2016 he performed at Yash (actor) and Radhika Pandit wedding giving the couple a "Grand Entrance" by walking and playing the violin LIVE, as they went on stage with over 25000 people present. In 2017 Aneesh performed for spiritual gurus Sri Sri Ravishankar, Baba Ramdev, Sadhguru, and Ganapathi Sachchidananda. In 2018 Aneesh opened the Association of Kannada Kootas of America convention held at Dallas, Texas USA with his "Walking Violinist" act, followed by a performance. In 2019 Aneesh performed for the 47th Governor of Pennsylvania - Tom Wolf at the Pennsylvania State Capitol at Harrisburg. In 2020 Aneesh toured Canada with Kannada rapper Chandan Shetty.
