= Vidyawati Vidyashankar =

Indian politician

Vidhyawati Vidyashankar was an Indian politician from the state of the Madhya Pradesh. She represented Chhindwara Vidhan Sabha constituency of undivided Madhya Pradesh Legislative Assembly by winning General election of 1957.
