= Khandwa =

City in Madhya Pradesh, India

- City
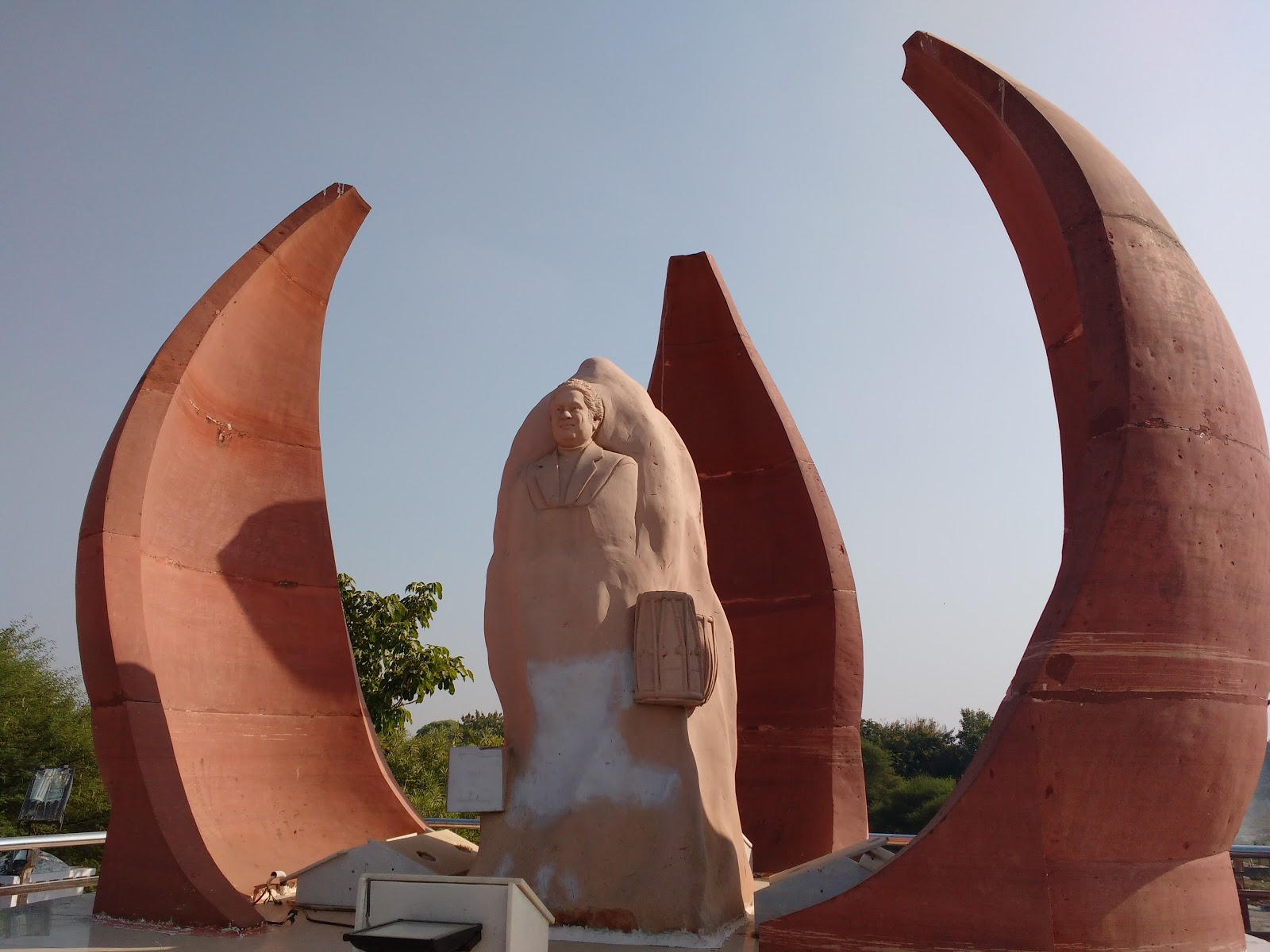
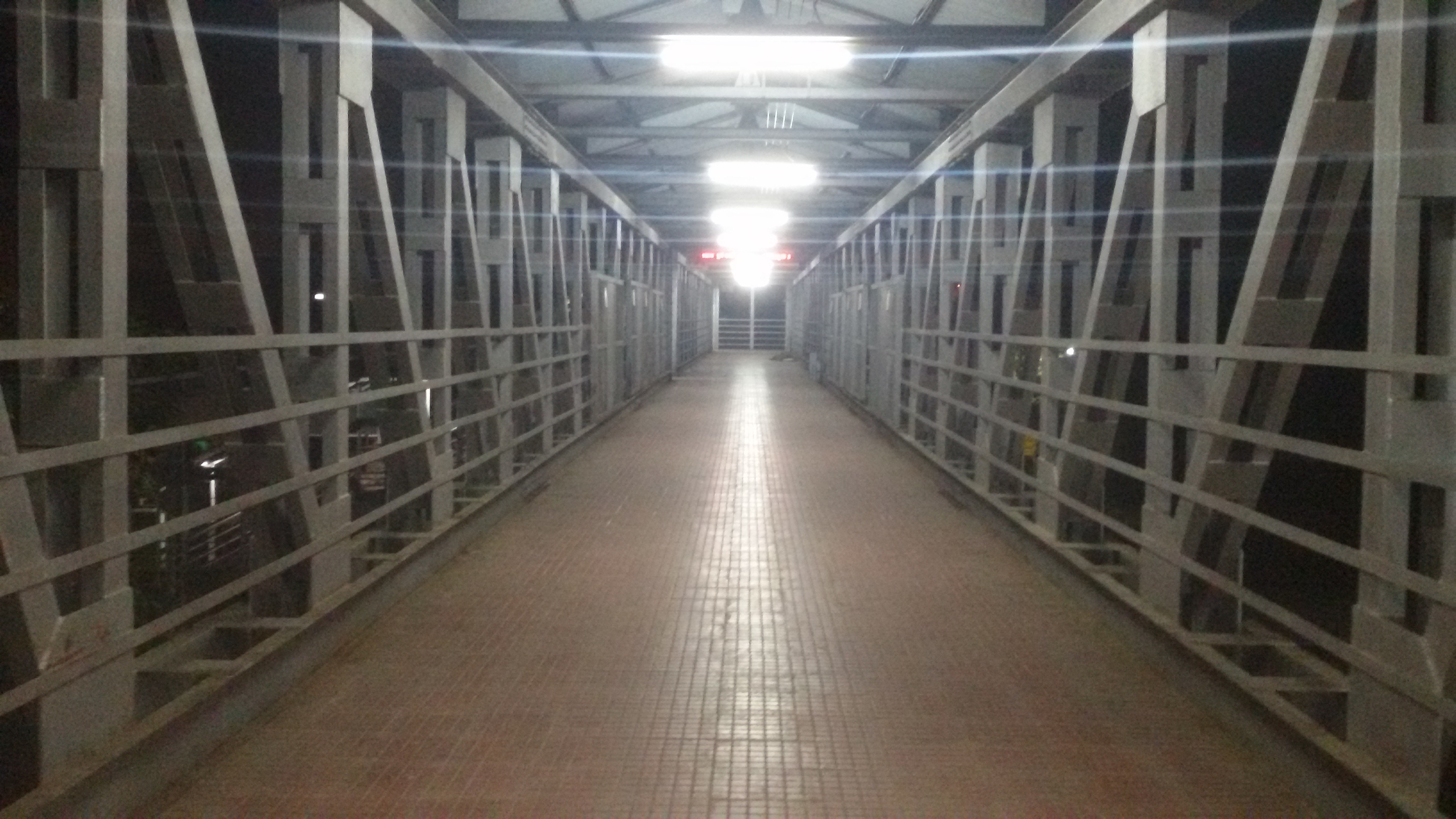
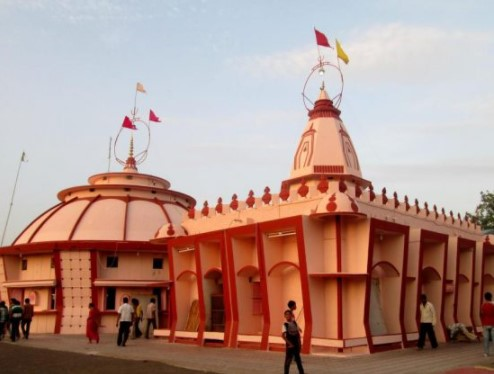
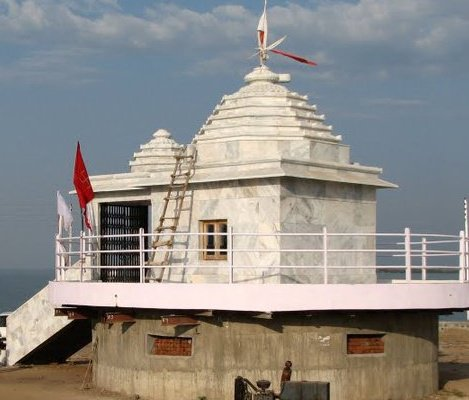
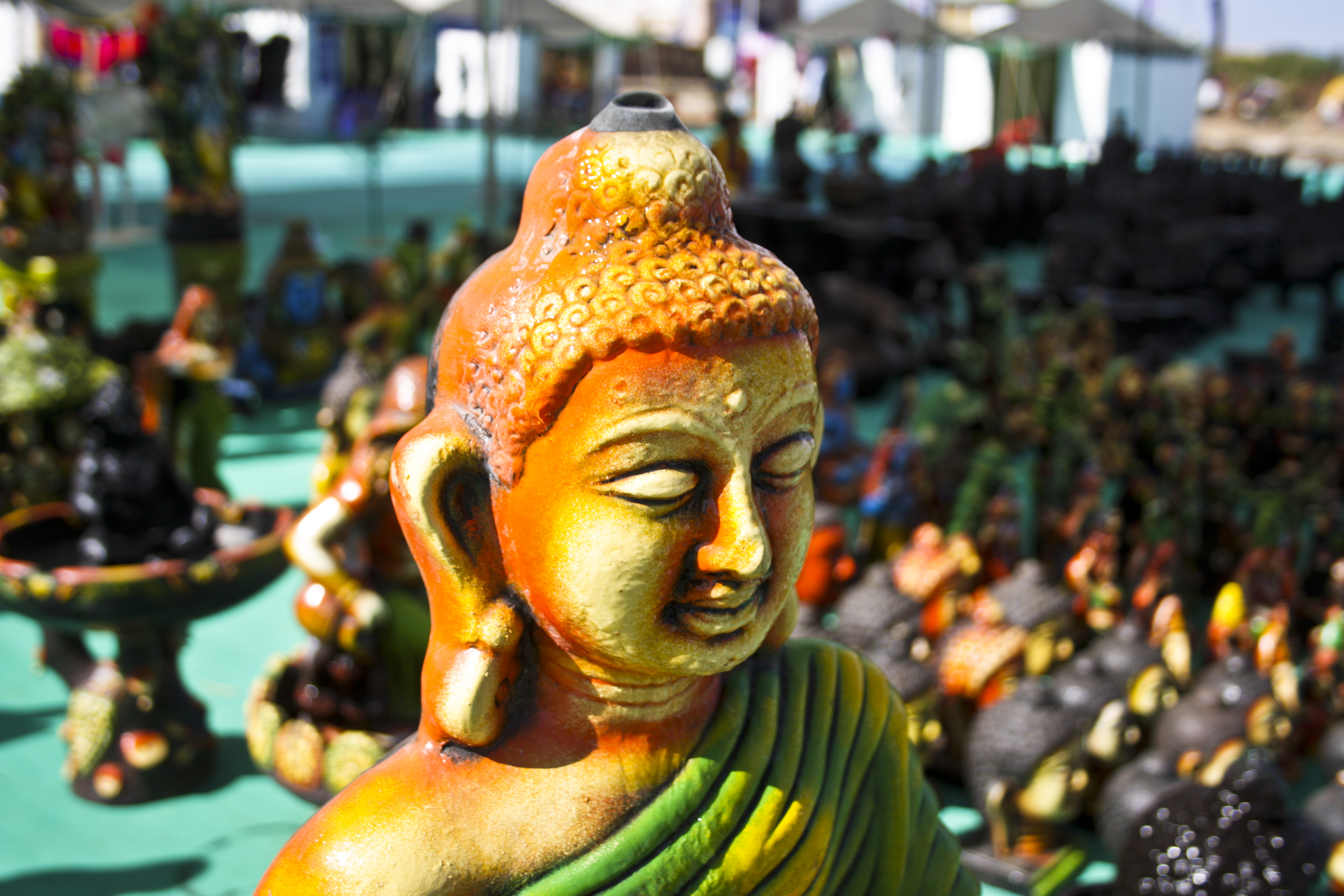
- Kishore Kumar Memorial Khandwa Junction Foot Over Bridge Dhuni Wale Dada Darbar Sant Singaji Samadhi Sthal Jalmahotsav Craft

- Location within Madhya Pradesh Location within India
- Coordinates: 21.82°N 76.35°E
- Country: India
- State: Madhya Pradesh
- District: Khandwa

Government
  - Type: Mayor–Council
  - Body: Khandwa Municipal Corporation
  - Mayor: Amrita Amar Yadav (BJP)
- Elevation: 309 m (1,014 ft)

Population (2011)
  - Total: 200,738

Language
  - Official: Hindi
- Time zone: UTC+5:30 (IST)
- PIN: 450001,450051
- Telephone code: +91 - 733
- Vehicle registration: MP-12
- Website: khandwa.nic.in

Khandwa is a city and a nagar nigam in the Nimar region of Madhya Pradesh, India. It is the administrative headquarters of the Khandwa district, formerly known as East Nimar District.

Khandwa is a major railway junction; the Malwa line connecting Indore with the Deccan meets the main east–west line from Mumbai to Kolkata.

== History ==
The name of the city is derived from "Khandav Van", which literally means Khandav Forests.

=== Ancient history ===
Recent explorations in the beds/tributaries of Narmada have revealed traces of the Paleolithic men in the East Nimar district. Omkar Mandhata, a rocky island on the bank of the Narmada river, about 47 miles north-west of Khandwa, is said to have been conquered by the Haihaya king Mahishmant, who had named the same as Mahishmati.

During the rise of Buddhism, the East Nimar region was included in the Avanti Kingdom under Chand Pradyota Mahesana, which was later added to the growing empire of Magadha by Shishunaga. From the early 2nd century BCE to late 15th century CE, the Nimar Region (earlier a part of Khandesh) was ruled by many dynasties, which include Mauryas, Shungas, Early Satvahanas, Kardamakas, and Abhiras (Ahir Gavli). Vakatakas, Imperial Guptas, Kalchuris, Vardhanas (of Harsha Vardhana fame), Chalukyas, Rashtrakutas, Paramaras, Faruki Dynasty.

== Geography ==
Khandwa is located at 21.83°N 76.33°E. It has an average elevation of 313 metres (1026 feet).

== Climate ==
Climate data for Khandwa (1991–2020)
Month	Jan	Feb	Mar	Apr	May	Jun	Jul	Aug	Sep	Oct	Nov	Dec	Year
Record high °C (°F)	35.5 (95.9)	39.5 (103.1)	43.3 (109.9)	46.7 (116.1)	47.6 (117.7)	46.3 (115.3)	42.2 (108.0)	39.4 (102.9)	40.6 (105.1)	40.1 (104.2)	40.1 (104.2)	34.5 (94.1)	47.6 (117.7)
Mean daily maximum °C (°F)	28.6 (83.5)	31.5 (88.7)	36.7 (98.1)	40.3 (104.5)	41.7 (107.1)	37.2 (99.0)	31.1 (88.0)	29.6 (85.3)	31.6 (88.9)	34.0 (93.2)	32.1 (89.8)	29.8 (85.6)	33.7 (92.7)
Mean daily minimum °C (°F)	10.9 (51.6)	13.5 (56.3)	18.6 (65.5)	23.6 (74.5)	26.7 (80.1)	25.1 (77.2)	22.8 (73.0)	22.1 (71.8)	21.7 (71.1)	18.6 (65.5)	15.1 (59.2)	11.4 (52.5)	19.1 (66.4)
Record low °C (°F)	1.7 (35.1)	0.2 (32.4)	6.0 (42.8)	11.1 (52.0)	17.2 (63.0)	16.0 (60.8)	15.1 (59.2)	14.5 (58.1)	12.2 (54.0)	8.5 (47.3)	4.6 (40.3)	1.2 (34.2)	0.2 (32.4)
Average rainfall mm (inches)	5.7 (0.22)	2.8 (0.11)	3.8 (0.15)	2.1 (0.08)	7.1 (0.28)	125.9 (4.96)	295.1 (11.62)	222.1 (8.74)	194.6 (7.66)	39.7 (1.56)	10.1 (0.40)	2.4 (0.09)	911.3 (35.88)
Average rainy days	0.3	0.4	0.6	0.4	0.6	5.8	12.2	11.9	7.7	2.0	0.7	0.2	42.8
Average relative humidity (%) (at 17:30 IST)	33	23	17	14	20	42	66	72	62	42	36	33	38
Source: India Meteorological Department

== Demographics ==
As of the 2011 Census of India, Khandwa had a population of 200,738, of which 102,901 were males and 97,837 were females. Population within the age group of 0 to 6 years was 24,801. The total number of literates in Khandwa was 151,545, which constituted 75.5% of the population with male literacy of 78.9% and female literacy of 71.9%. The effective literacy rate of 7+ population of Khandwa was 86.1%, of which male literacy rate was 90.4% and female literacy rate was 81.7%. The Scheduled Castes and Scheduled Tribes population was 27,430 and 8,139 respectively. There were 39002 households in Khandwa in 2011.

Religions in Khandwa (2011)
Religion	Percent
Hindus	67.18%
Muslims	29.29%
Jains	1.30%
Christians	0.86%
Sikhs	0.68%
Buddhists	0.57%
Other or not stated	0.12%

Languages of Khandwa (2011)
1. Hindi (67.4%)
2. Urdu (15.0%)
3. Nimadi (6.14%)
4. Marathi (4.13%)
5. Sindhi (3.30%)
6. Gujarati (1.14%)
7. Others (2.87%)

Hindi is the most spoken language. Nimadi is the local dialect. Urdu, Marathi and Sindhi are also common.

== Culture and cityscape ==
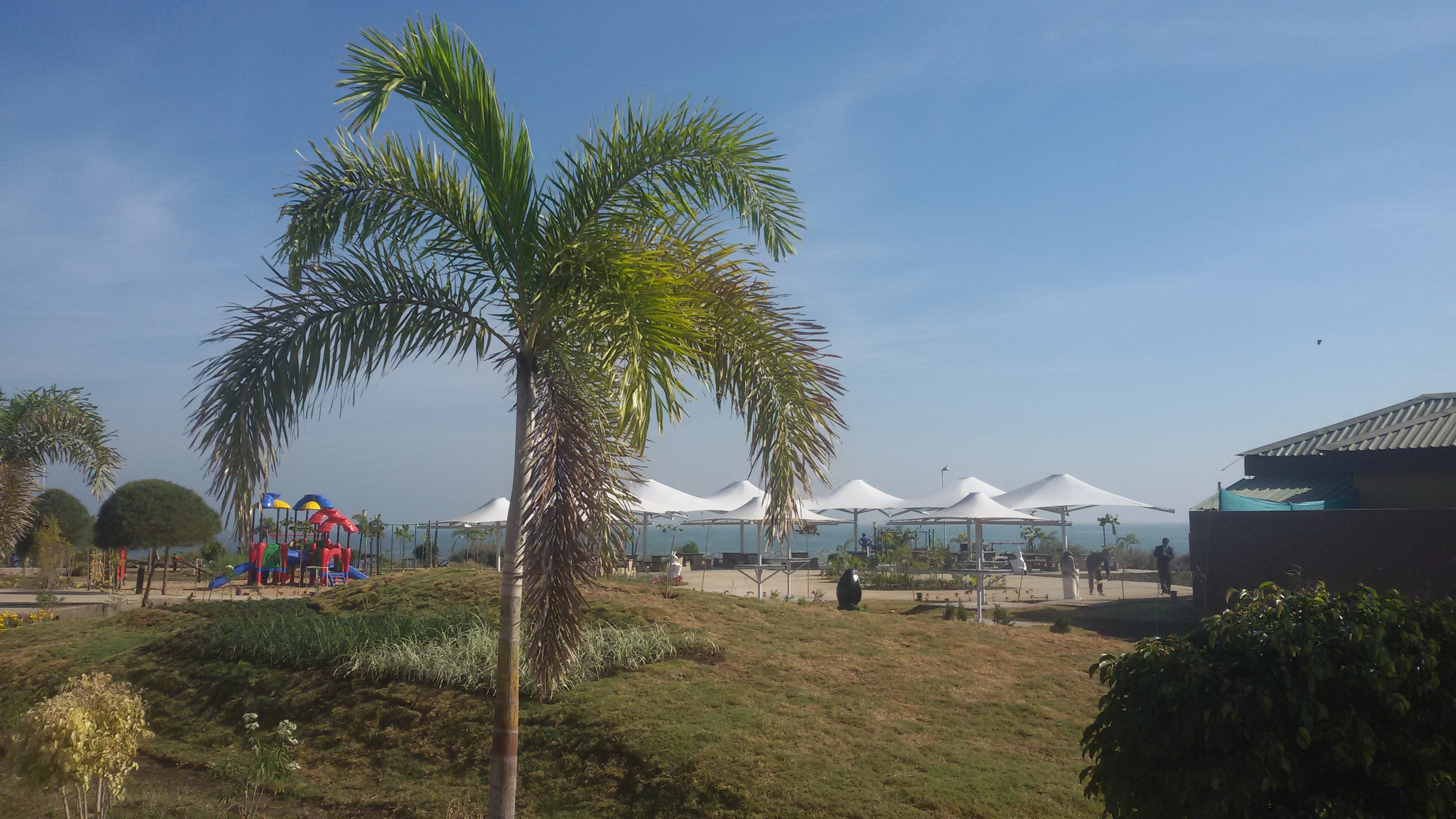
Hanuwantiya tourist complex

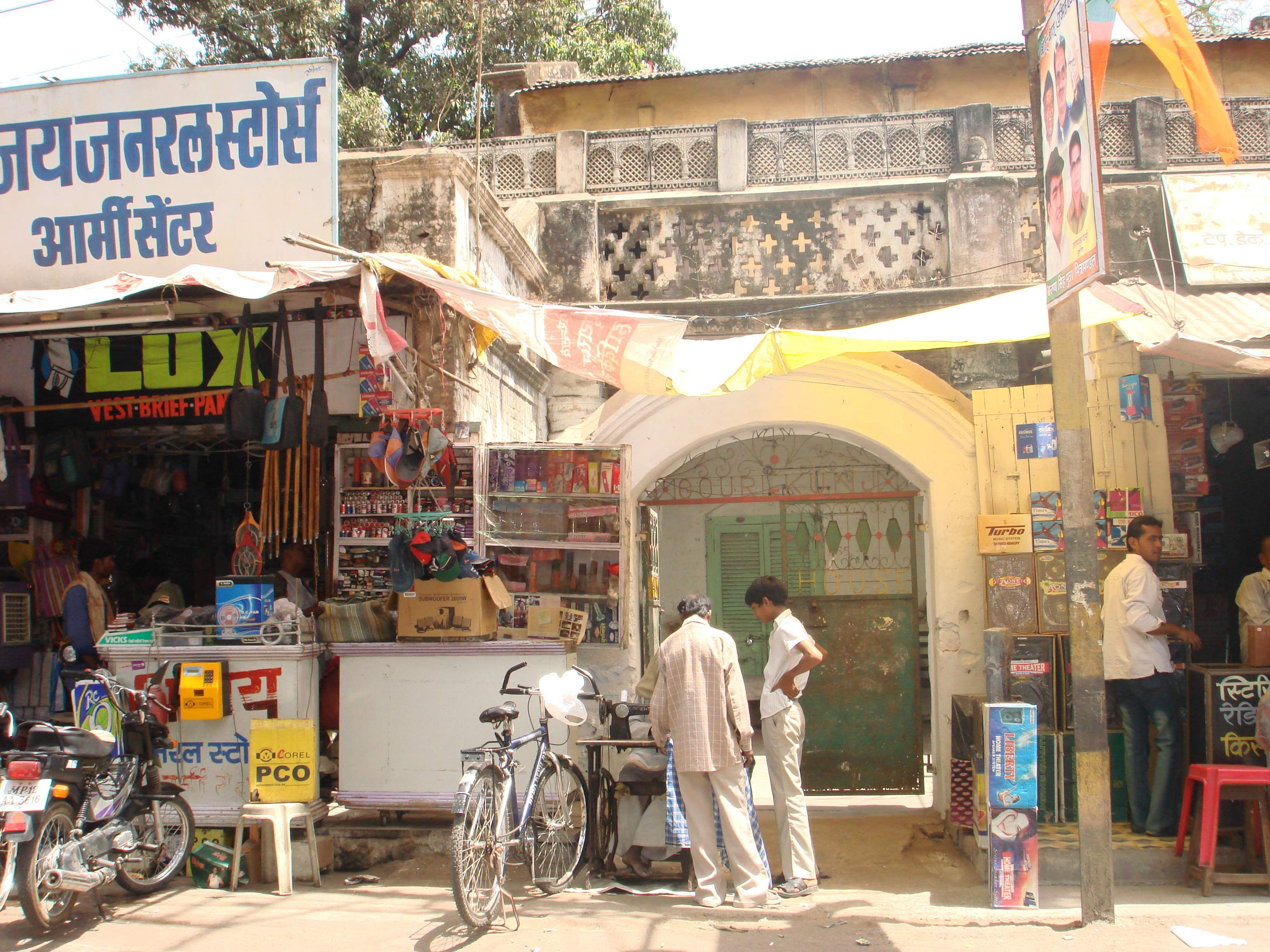
Ganguli House (Gauri Kunj), Kishoreda's ancestral home

- Ganguli House, the ancestral home of Ashok Kumar and Kishore Kumar. Also named Gauri Kunj, after their mother.
- Samadhi of Kishore Kumar.
- Four Kunds located in four directions of the city, called Padam Kund, Bheem Kund, Suraj Kund and Rameshwar Kund.
- Dada Darbar, popularly known as Shri Dadaji Dhuniwale.
- Shree Vitthal Mandir Khandwa the temple was founded by shree swami sacchidanand swami maharj in 1850, temple is made up of sheesham and sagvan wood. Great example of architecture.

== Notable people ==
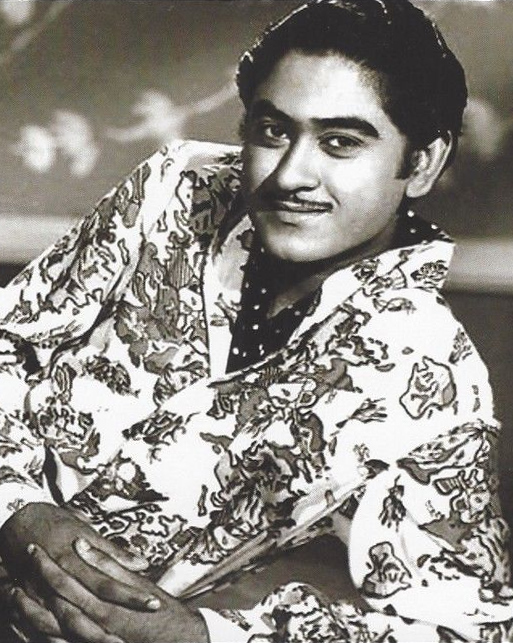
Kishore Kumar as a young man

- Ashok Kumar, actor
- Anoop Kumar, actor
- Kishore Kumar, actor and singer
- Makhanlal Chaturvedi, poet
- Saroo Brierley, born in Ganesh Talai as Sheru Munshi Khan prior to adoption to Australia
- Bhagwantrao Mandloi, former Chief Minister of Madhya Pradesh
- Zakia Jafri, was an Indian human rights activist

== Transport ==
The nearest commercial airport is Indore. It also has an airstrip which is rarely used for occasional aircraft landings, located on Nagchun Road.

Khandwa has a major railway junction located on the Jabalpur-Bhusaval section of Howrah–Prayagraj–Mumbai line.

== Educational institutes ==
- Dr. C.V. Raman University, established in 2018
- Government Medical College, established in 2018
- Makhanlal Chaturvedi National University of Journalism and Communication, Khandwa, established in 1992

== In popular culture ==
- The town was featured in the 2016 Australian biographical film Lion, which was based on the extraordinary search for his birth family by Khandwa-born Saroo Brierley, who got lost as a child and ended up in Australia after being adopted.

== See also ==
- Mahishmati
- Burhanpur
