= Kirandul =

- town
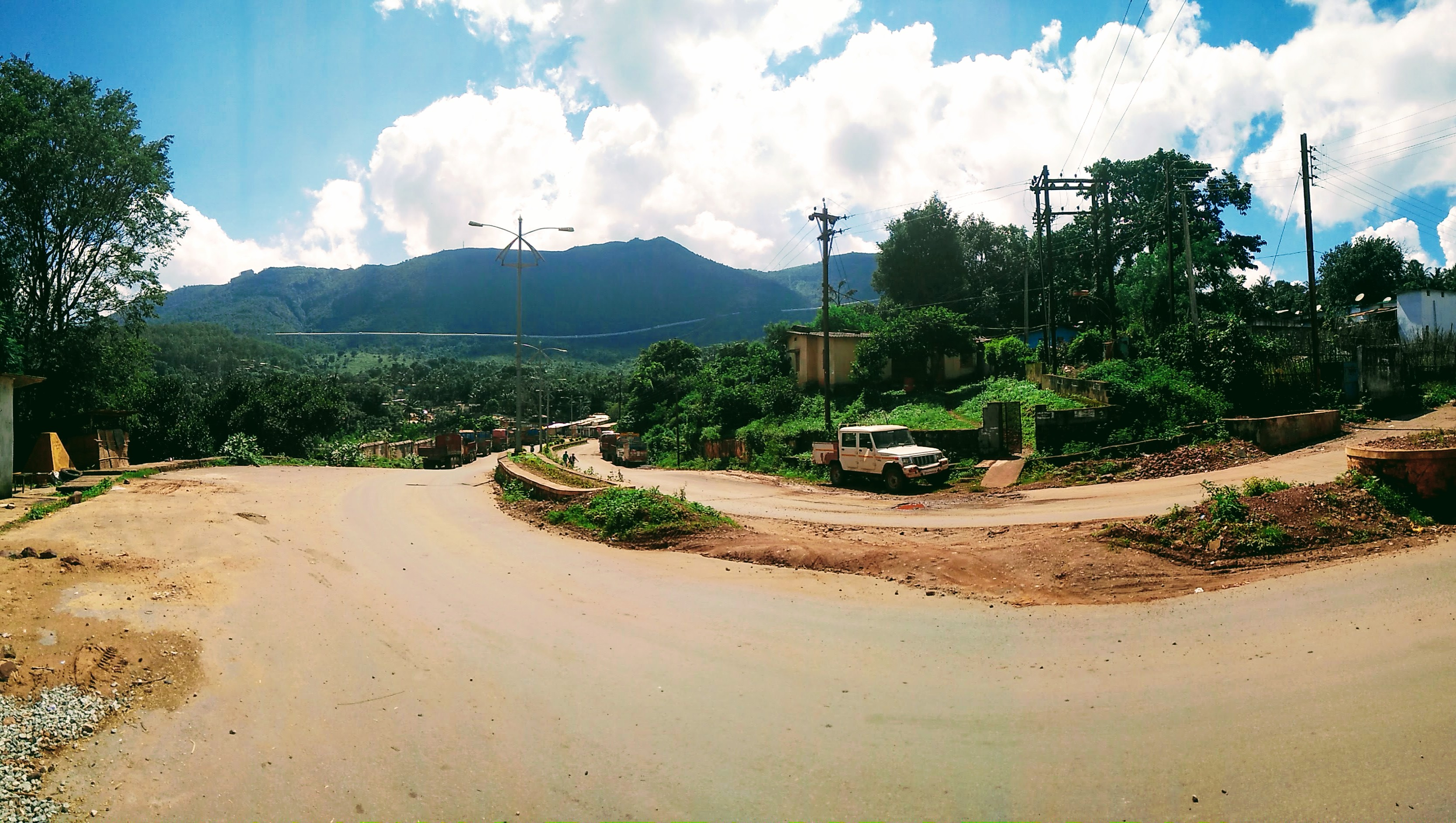
- Bailadila hills

- Location within Chhattisgarh Location within India
- Coordinates: 18°37′57″N 81°15′34″E
- Country: India
- State: Chhattisgarh
- District: Dantewada

Government
  - Type: Municipality
  - Body: Nagar Palika Kirandul
- Elevation: 540 m (1,770 ft)

Population (2011)
  - Total: 18,887

Languages
  - Official: Hindi, Halbi
  - Other: Gondi, Telugu, Koya
- Time zone: UTC+5:30 (IST)
- PIN: 494556
- Telephone code: 07857
- Vehicle registration: CG-18
- Nearest city: Jagdalpur, Dantewada
- Sex ratio: 932 ♀/ 1000 ♂
- Lok Sabha constituency: Bastar
- Vidhan Sabha constituency: Dantewada
- Website: dantewada.gov.in

Kirandul is a town and a municipality in Dantewada district in the Indian Indian state of Chhattisgarh, roughly 400 km south of the state capital Raipur and 41 km southwest of the district headquarters Dantewada. It has one of the world's largest iron ore reserves according to a 2021 survey. 10,000 tribal people from 200 surrounding villages protested for five days against mining operations in Kirandul and Bailadila range in 2019.

== Climate ==
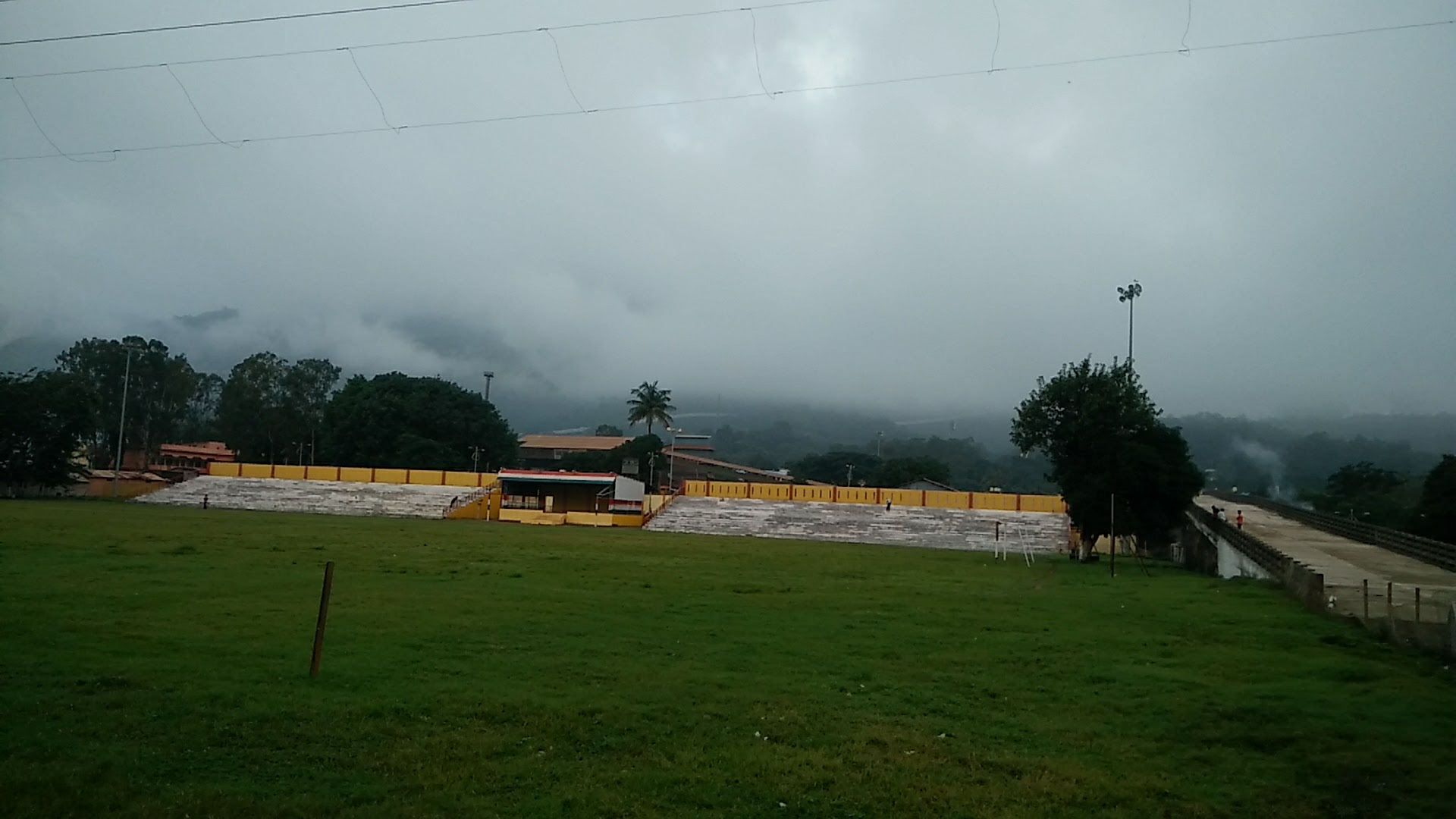
Hilltop view from Football ground during rainy season

Bailadila region enjoys mild summer and winter is not severe. The maximum temperature in summer rises up to 40 degree Celsius between May and June whereas minimum temperature in winter drops to 10 degree Celsius. The area receives heavy rains during monsoon from June to October. Weather during rainy season is stormy accompanied by gales and the hilltops are covered with thick clouds and dense fog, which reduces visibility.

Climate data for kirandul, India
Month	Jan	Feb	Mar	Apr	May	Jun	Jul	Aug	Sep	Oct	Nov	Dec	Year
Record high °C (°F)	32.9 (91.2)	35.9 (96.6)	39.6 (103.3)	42.5 (108.5)	44.8 (112.6)	42.6 (108.7)	35.9 (96.6)	33.4 (92.1)	34.0 (93.2)	33.9 (93.0)	33.0 (91.4)	31.5 (88.7)	44.8 (112.6)
Mean daily maximum °C (°F)	28.2 (82.8)	30.9 (87.6)	34.9 (94.8)	37.2 (99.0)	38.1 (100.6)	33.4 (92.1)	28.6 (83.5)	28.4 (83.1)	29.6 (85.3)	29.9 (85.8)	28.2 (82.8)	27.2 (81.0)	31.2 (88.2)
Daily mean °C (°F)	19.9 (67.8)	23.0 (73.4)	26.9 (80.4)	30.0 (86.0)	31.2 (88.2)	28.5 (83.3)	25.7 (78.3)	25.4 (77.7)	25.9 (78.6)	24.7 (76.5)	21.7 (71.1)	19.5 (67.1)	25.2 (77.4)
Mean daily minimum °C (°F)	11.6 (52.9)	14.3 (57.7)	18.5 (65.3)	22.2 (72.0)	24.2 (75.6)	23.8 (74.8)	22.3 (72.1)	22.2 (72.0)	22 (72)	19.6 (67.3)	14.9 (58.8)	11.1 (52.0)	18.9 (66.0)
Record low °C (°F)	2.8 (37.0)	7.0 (44.6)	8.3 (46.9)	14.8 (58.6)	17.0 (62.6)	14.3 (57.7)	18.3 (64.9)	19.3 (66.7)	17.4 (63.3)	11.0 (51.8)	5.9 (42.6)	4.4 (39.9)	2.8 (37.0)
Average precipitation mm (inches)	9.1 (0.36)	15.6 (0.61)	16 (0.6)	51.1 (2.01)	73.2 (2.88)	239.6 (9.43)	369.4 (14.54)	377.5 (14.86)	236.9 (9.33)	101.1 (3.98)	24.3 (0.96)	7.7 (0.30)	1,521.5 (59.90)
Average rainy days	0.8	1.5	1.6	4.5	6.8	13.8	20.5	21.1	15.4	6.8	2.2	0.6	95.6
Average relative humidity (%)	59	51	42	43	47	69	84	86	82	74	68	65	64
Source: Weatherbase

== Demographics ==
As of 2011 India census, Kirandul had a population of 18887 of which 9776 are males while 9111 are females as per report released by Census India 2011.No official census data has been released since then due to delays in the 2021 enumeration; unofficial projections estimate the population at approximately 28,100 by 2026.

The population of children aged 0–6 is 2317 which is 12.27% of total population of Kirandul M). In Kirandul Municipality, the female sex ratio is 932 against state average of 991. Moreover child sex ratio in Kirandul is around 1015 compared to Chhattisgarh state average of 969. The literacy rate of Kirandul town is 73.7% - higher than the state average of 71.04%. In Kirandul, male literacy is around 79.9% while the female literacy rate is 67.02%.

== Region ==
This region is basically a plateau. The Bailadila Range of hills are located at a distance of about 41 km south west of Dantewada, the district headquarters in Chhattisgarh State.

Rising to a height of 1,276 m, one of the hills of the Bailadila Range is the highest point in the state of Chhattisgarh. Bailadila has been established as an industrial area that has been divided into two towns, namely Bade Bacheli (29 kilometers from Dantewada) & Kirandul (41 kilometers from Dantewada).

== Economy ==
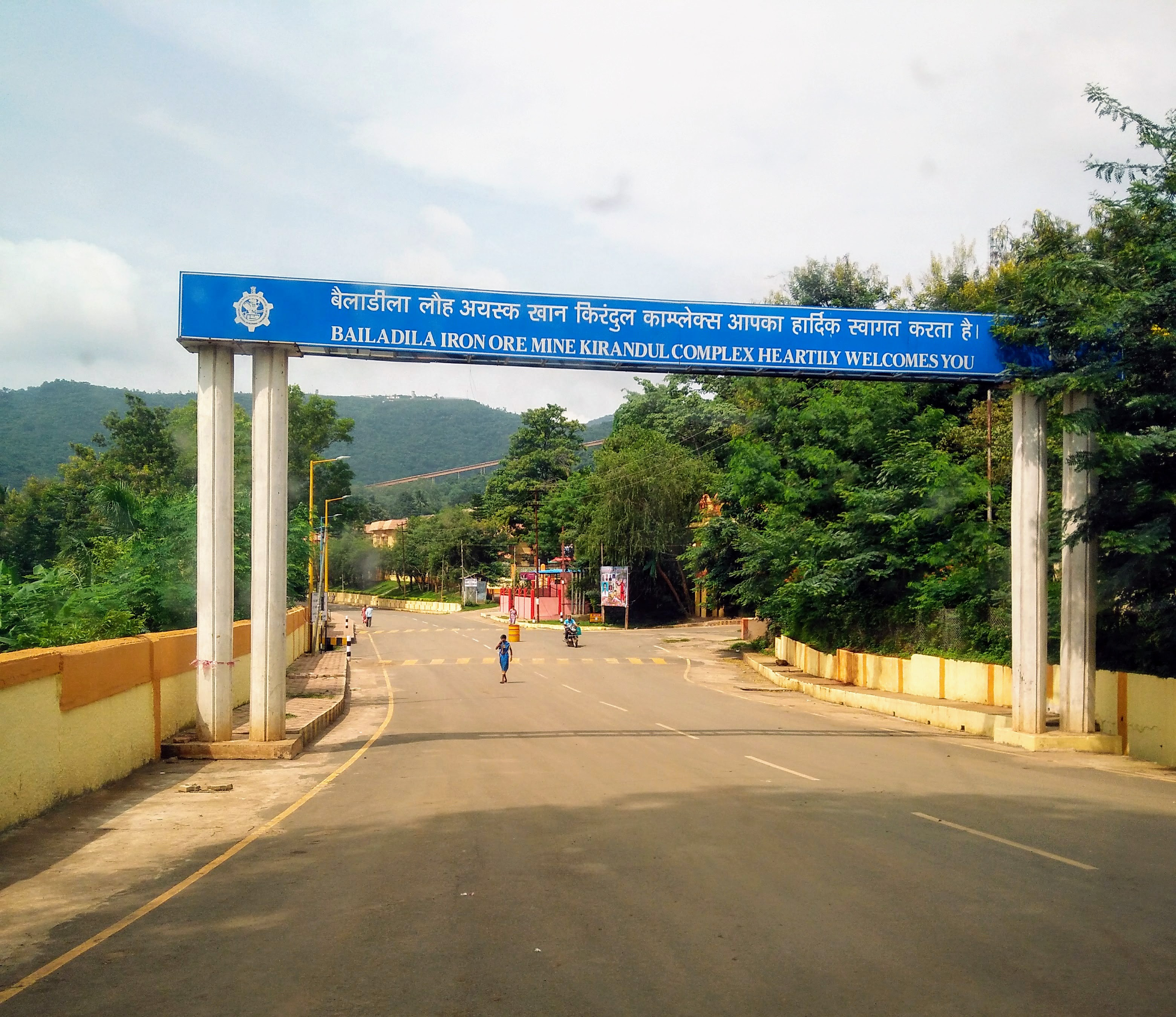
Kirandul main road

The iron ore mines here are also an important tourist attraction. Run by the Navratna Government Organization,'NMDC', these mines operate with the latest technology and hi-tech machinery. However, one needs to obtain permit to visit the mines, which can be done by requesting the NMDC office. The mines are generally open to the public on Vishwakarma Puja day every year and huge number of people visit during that time.

The Bailadila iron ore range extends for a length of 40 km with a width of about 10 km mostly along the top of hill, which constitute one of the richest concentration of iron-ore of world. The range contains 1200 million tonnes of high grade iron ore distributed in 14 deposits. 14 reserves have been discovered, of which 3 are being mined. Deposit 14/11C and 11B are the mines located in Kirandul complex while Deposit 5, 10 and 11A are located in Bacheli complex of Bailadila Iron ore mines. Bailadila Deposit-14 mine is the first large scale open cast mechanised iron ore mine in India for which DPR was prepared by NMDC and was commissioned in April, 1968. Bailadila Deposit-11C was commissioned in June, 1988; The ore is exported through Visakhapatnam Port.

The entire area was brought to the mainstream of civilisation by the spectacular effort of NMDC by opening-up of mines. Today, Bailadila is a name to reckon within the world iron ore market because of its super high-grade iron ore. Bailadila complex possesses the world’s best grade of hard lumpy ore having +66% iron content, free from sulphur and other deleterious material and the best physical properties needed for steel making. Essar Steel Slurry beneficiation plant is situated in Kirandul which is used to transport iron ore through Slurry pipeline to Essar Steel pellet plant facility in Visakhapatnam. It has its own helipad for personal usage. At 267 km, the Kirandul-Vizag pipeline is the longest Slurry pipeline in India.

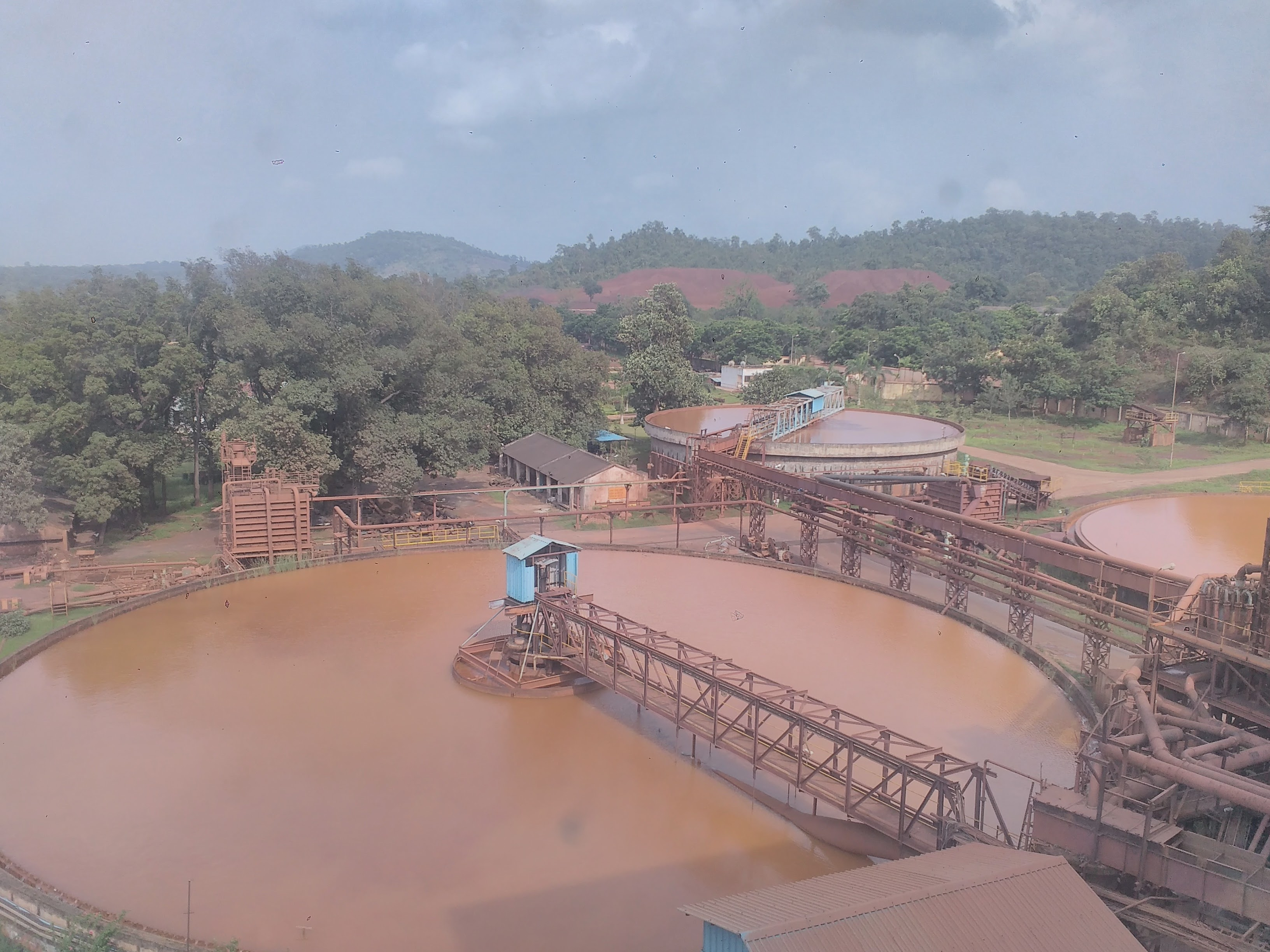
Essar slurry beneficiation plant, Kirandul

In FY 2025–26, NMDC Limited recorded its highest-ever iron ore production of 53.15 million tonnes (up 21% YoY) and sales of 50.23 million tonnes (up 13% YoY), with the Bailadila complexes at Kirandul and Bacheli contributing significantly to this performance. The company aims for over 100 million tonnes annual capacity by 2030. Key ongoing projects at Kirandul include the construction of Screening Plant III, which will enhance ore processing capacity and support higher production volumes while maintaining high-grade output.

NMDC is investing in sustainable logistics and value addition. This includes a major slurry pipeline project (with a key segment from Bailadila/Bacheli to Nagarnar) and new beneficiation facilities. A slime beneficiation plant at Kirandul is also planned to recover iron ore from tailings, promoting zero-waste mining.

== Amenities ==
Kirandul, primarily an NMDC township, offers a range of amenities developed for its employees and local residents.

=== Healthcare ===
The NMDC Project Hospital is the primary multi-speciality healthcare facility in Kirandul. It provides services including general medicine, surgery, paediatrics, obstetrics & gynaecology, and advanced care. In 2026, it was awarded the Best Smart Hospital of the Year in the Tier 2 / Tier 3 Cities category for its healthcare excellence in remote areas.

=== Education ===
Educational facilities include NMDC-supported schools within the township and the Government Arvind College (offering undergraduate and postgraduate courses in Arts, Science, and Commerce). Kendriya Vidyalaya Kirandul provides additional schooling with sports infrastructure.

=== Housing and Township Facilities ===
NMDC has developed a comprehensive township with residential quarters. In 2026, major expansion projects were underway, including the construction of new high-rise residential towers. Rail Vikas Nigam Limited (RVNL) was awarded contracts worth over ₹656 crore for:

- Construction of a new residential tower (₹284.52 crore).
- Comprehensive township development (₹371.69 crore).

These projects feature modern high-rise towers with 1,293 quarters, hostels, studio apartments, green spaces, rainwater harvesting, a sports complex, clubhouse, shopping complex, cafeteria, and internal roads.

=== Other Amenities ===
- Banking: Branches of State Bank of India, UCO Bank, and other local banks.
- Public Services: Kirandul Police Station and a Branch Post Office.
- Shopping and Recreation: Local markets, township shopping complexes, community centres, and sports facilities (including gymnasium and swimming pool in the NMDC township).

== History ==
=== Early and Pre-Independence History ===
Kirandul and the surrounding Bailadila region formed a crucial part of the princely state of Bastar. The area prospered under the reign of King Annama Deva, brother of the Kakatiya ruler Pratapa Rudra Deva of Warangal. During the 19th century, the region came under British colonial administration. Following independence, it acceded to the Indian Union on 1 January 1948 and became part of Bastar district in Madhya Pradesh. In 2000, it was included in the newly formed state of Chhattisgarh.

=== Mining Development (Post-Independence) ===
The commercial potential of the Bailadila iron ore deposits was recognised in 1955–56 when Prof. Euemura of the Japanese Steel Mills Association highlighted their richness. An agreement with Japanese steel mills was signed in 1960. The National Mineral Development Corporation (NMDC) prepared the project report, which was approved in 1964. The first large-scale mechanised iron ore mine (Deposit 14) was commissioned in April 1968, followed by Deposit 11C in June 1988.

NMDC, with Japanese collaboration, established the mining operations that transformed Kirandul from a remote tribal area into a major industrial township. The high-grade (+66% Fe) ore from Bailadila quickly gained international recognition, with Kobe Steel of Japan becoming a major buyer. While exports to Japan have reduced in recent years, NMDC primarily supplies high-grade iron ore to domestic steel plants in India.

== Transport ==
Kirandul is easily accessible and well connected to Raipur, Visakhapatnam, Vijayawada and Hyderabad by all-weather roads. It can also be reached by rail from Visakhapatnam. There is regular iron ore movement from this sector to Visakhapatnam port by rail.

=== Air transport ===
There is an airport at Jagdalpur where until recent years no scheduled services were run to or from here. This changed with the inauguration of flight services by Chhattisgarh CM Bhupesh Baghel in 2020 thereby giving Jagdalpur the privilege of having the second civil airport in the State. Although several attempts were made earlier in 2018 for flights to Bhubhaneshwar and Raipur, the project was not successful and was discontinued. Maa Danteshwari Airport in Jagdalpur has flights operated by Alliance Air to Raipur and Hyderabad where the travel time is 45 minutes and 75 minutes respectively. This is in contrast to the travel time by roadways of 7 hours and 12 hours respectively to the destinations thereby saving a considerable amount of time

The airport was predominantly used by political leaders and insurgency operation-related activities by the army and the police. With the recent developments, the airport will serve the population of the nearby districts well and would act as a means of promoting tourism in the State. The airport also helped in boosting the vaccination programme against Covid-19 as the various medical equipment and medicines were conveniently transported. The other nearest airports are Raipur Airport in the capital city of Raipur and Alluri Sitarama Raju International Airport, Andhra Pradesh.

=== Rail Transport ===
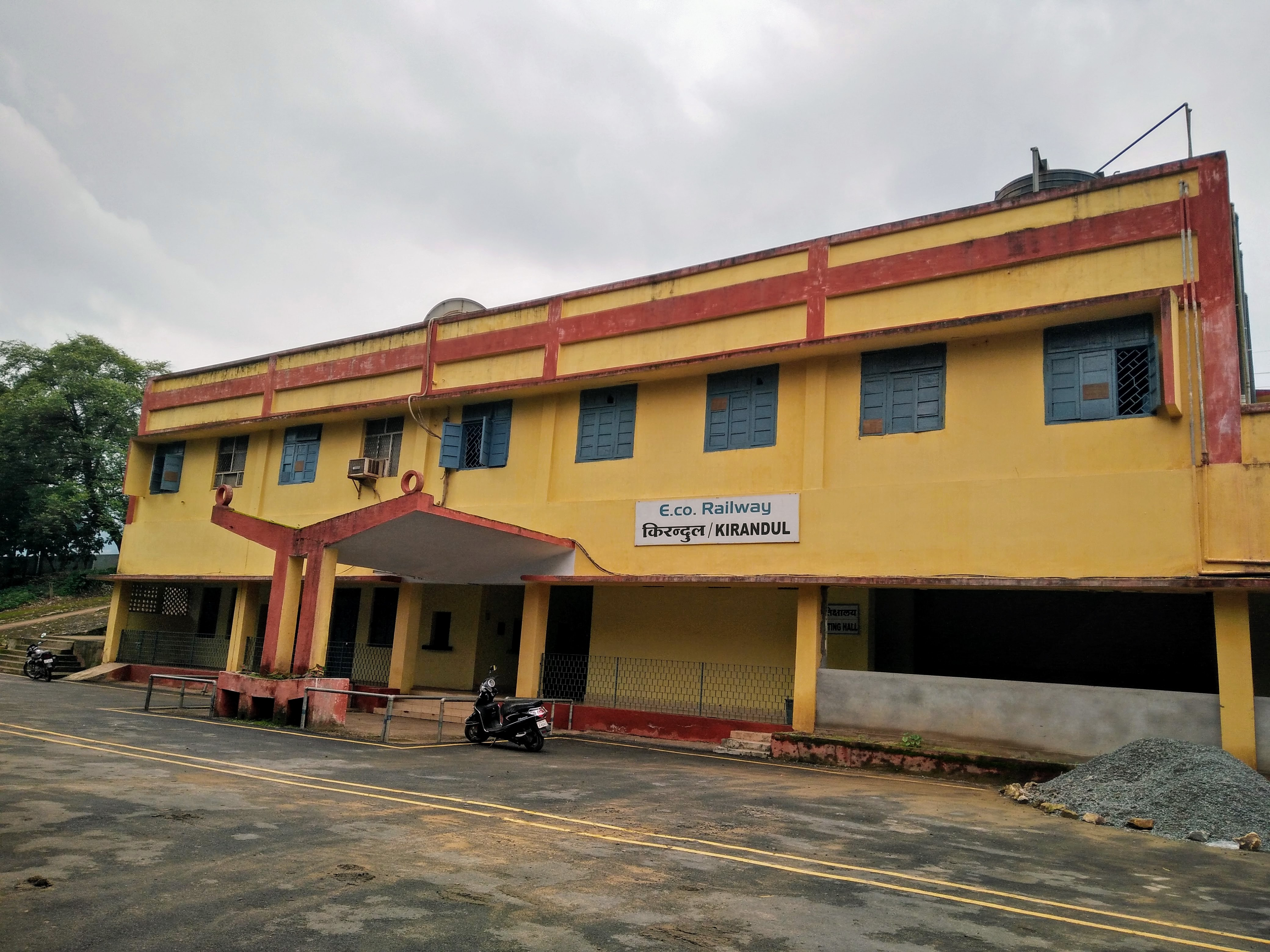
Kirandul Railway Station

The Kothavalasa–Kirandul line of East Coast Railway from Kirandul to Visakhapatnam via Koraput is laid through the Eastern Ghats. Up to Araku station, it has many tunnels. Also it pass through the highest elevation Broad gauge station in the Eastern ghats, Semiliguda, just before the Borra caves. Kirandul - Kothavalasa Railroad is the record high Broad Gauge line in the Eastern Ghats. The KK Line has the distinction of being the second highest broad gauge railway line in the country after the one in Jammu.

A line from Bailadila to Visakhapatnam via Jagdalpur is in place mainly for the purposes of evacuation of iron ore by National Mineral Development Corporation (NMDC) from Kirandul with limited passenger trains. Plans are underway for doubling the railway line from Bailadila to Jagdalpur. As of November 2023, the work has already started for doubling the railway line from Kirandul. Indian Railways has undertaken expansion work. The cost of this is projected to be about INR 870 crore which is proposed to be initially borne by NMDC and NMDC will in turn get a rebate in the freight from Indian Railways towards the initial cost incurred by NMDC.

Work on doubling the 445 km Kothavalasa–Kirandul line is targeted for completion by March 2026, with significant progress reported in tunnel and track works.
