= Bade Bacheli =

- city
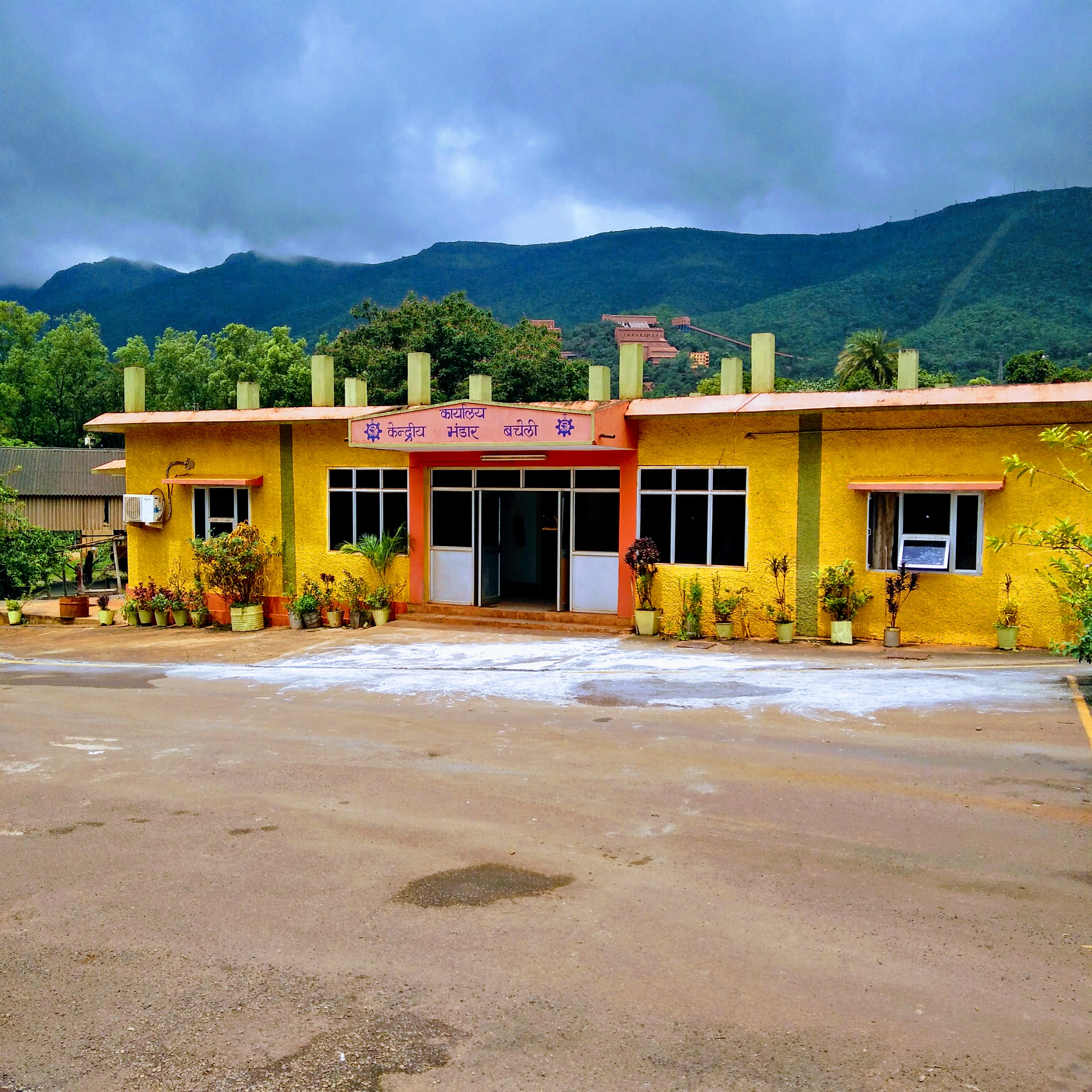
- Bailadila hills view from Bacheli

- Location within Chhattisgarh Location within India
- Coordinates: 18°42′19″N 81°15′7″E
- Country: India
- State: Chhattisgarh
- District: Dantewada

Population (2011)
  - Total: 21,435

Languages
  - Official: Hindi, Chhattisgarhi
- Time zone: UTC+5:30 (IST)
- Vehicle registration: CG-18
- Nearest city: Jagdalpur, Dantewada
- Sex ratio: 936 ♂/♀
- Lok Sabha constituency: Bastar
- Vidhan Sabha constituency: Dantewada
- Website: dantewada.gov.in

Bade Bacheli is a town and a Nagar Palika in Dantewada district in the state of Chhattisgarh, India. It is now very well known as NMDC Township with nature all around to explore and witness. It is situated roughly 400 km from Raipur, capital of Chhattisgarh. The way to travel is by Road with frequent bus service from Raipur, Bhilai, Jagdalpur, and Hyderabad, Visakhapatnam or by train from Jagdalpur and Vishakhapatnam.

== Demographics ==
As of 2011 India census, Bade Bacheli had a population of 21,435 of which 11,071 are males while 10,364 are females as per the report released by Census India 2011.

The population of children aged 0–6 is 2796, or 13.04% of the total population of Bade Bacheli (M). In Bade Bacheli Municipality, the female sex ratio is 936 against the state average of 991. Moreover, the child sex ratio in Bade Bacheli is around 1028 compared with the Chhattisgarh state average of 969. The literacy rate of Bade Bacheli city is around 68.05%, 14,587 total literates, of which 8,373 are male and 6,214 female (2011 census). In Bade Bacheli, male literacy is around 75.63% while the female literacy rate is 59.96%.

Bade Bacheli Municipality has total administration over 5,398 houses to which it supplies basic amenities like water and sewerage. It is also authorized to build roads within the Municipality limits and impose taxes on properties coming under its jurisdiction.

The population has raised primarily after the commissioning of the National Mineral Development Corporation (Government Organization) project here.

== Points of interest ==
Local points of interest include:

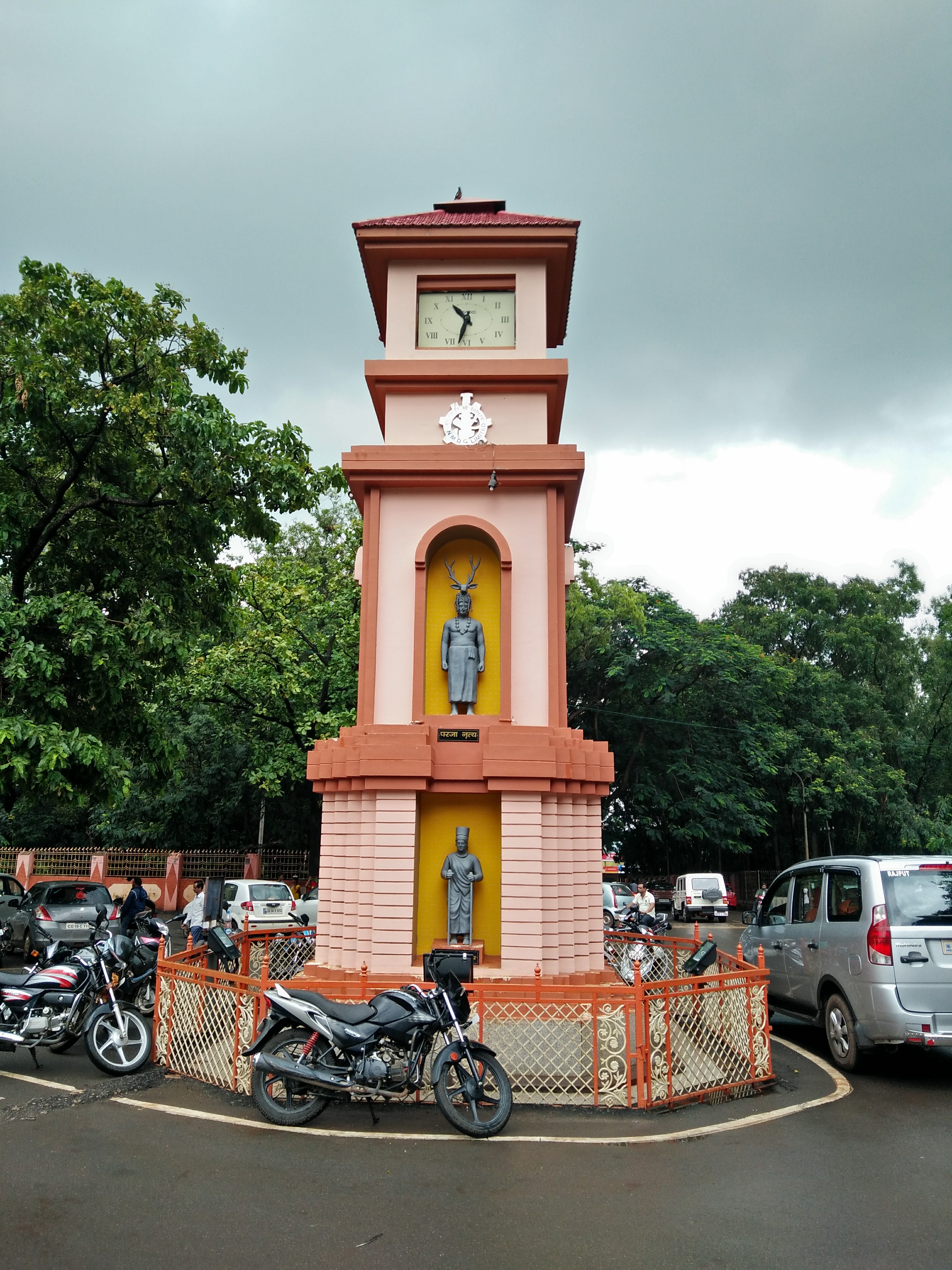
Clock tower in Bacheli town showcasing tribal costumes of Bailadila.

- Ghadi Chowk, which showcases the "tribal and cultural wealth" of Bastar, situated in the centre of Bacheli town.
- HighTech Park (Baludyan) and Ambedkar park with amusement activities and decoration in the city.
- Iron ore deposits (10&11A,5) under National Mineral Development Corporation, hills and unique technique to crush iron to extract the ore.

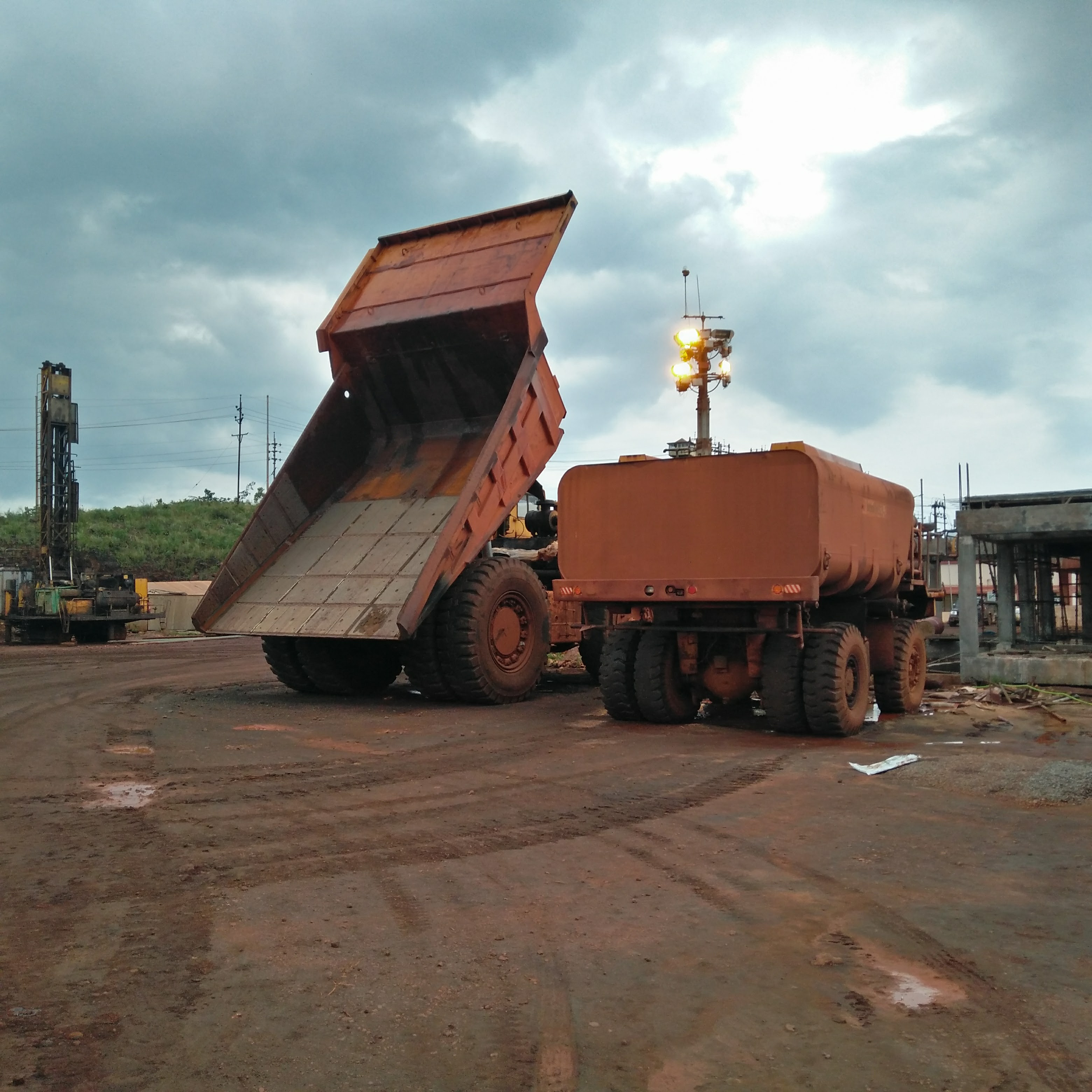
Bailadila Iron ore mines

- Akashnagar, a small residential place in the hills.
- Lingeswar Temple known for its architectural structure and history.
- The Essar Steel Slurry beneficiation plant situated in Kirandul is 10 km away from Bacheli Township and is used to transport iron ore through Slurry pipeline to Essar Steel's pellet plant facility in Visakhapatnam. It has its own helipad.

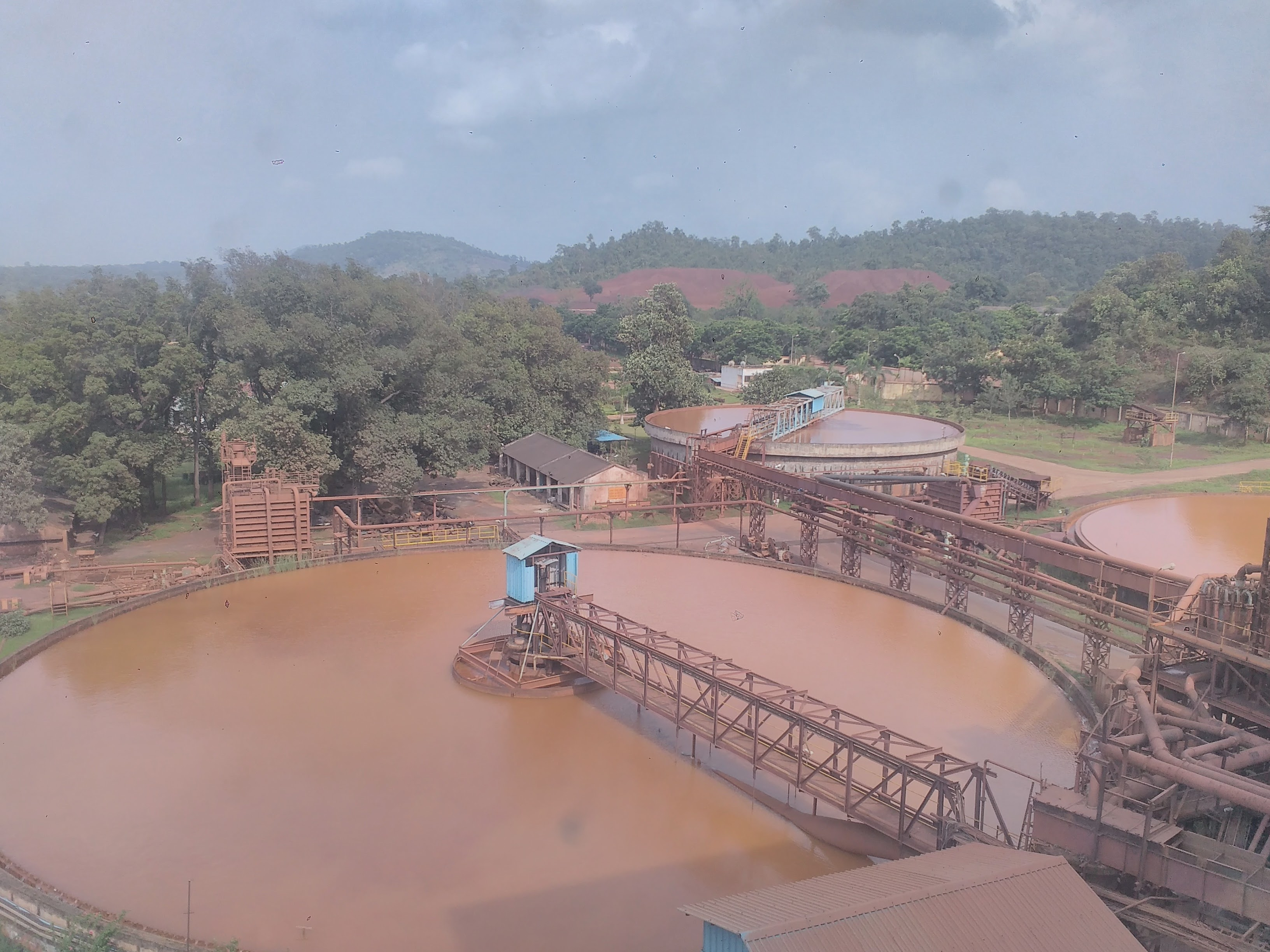
Essar slurry beneficiation plant, Kirandul

- Ramabooti Temple is situated in Kirandul 11B Deposit, 10 km away from Bacheli Township.
- The local mountain range is known for its deposits of iron ore. Total 14 reserves have been discovered in this range out of which the mining activities are going on in 3 deposits.
- Palnar -the first cashless village in Chhattisgarh is some 34 km away from Bacheli.

== Transport ==
Kirandul is easily accessible and well connected to Raipur, Visakhapatnam and Hyderabad by all-weather roads. It can also be reached by rail from Visakhapatnam. There is regular iron ore movement from this sector to Visakhapatnam port by rail.

=== Air transport ===
There is a domestic airport at Jagdalpur where until recent years no scheduled services were run to or from here. This changed with the inauguration of flight services by Chhattisgarh CM Bhupesh Baghel in 2020 thereby giving Jagdalpur the privilege of having the second civil airport in the State. Although several attempts were made earlier in 2018 for flights to Bhubhaneshwar and Raipur, the project was not successful and was discontinued. Maa Danteshwari Airport in Jagdalpur has flights operated by Alliance Air to Raipur and Hyderabad where the travel time is 45 minutes and 75 minutes respectively. This is in contrast to the travel time by roadways of 7 hours and 12 hours respectively to the destinations thereby saving a considerable amount of time. Indigo started weekly thrice flights to Delhi via Raipur for paramilitary forces.

The airport was predominantly used by political leaders and insurgency operation-related activities by the army and the police. With the recent developments, the airport will serve the population of the nearby districts well and would act as a means of promoting tourism in the State. The airport also helped in boosting the vaccination programme against COVID-19 as the various medical equipment and medicines were conveniently transported. The other nearest airports are Raipur Airport in the capital city of Raipur and Alluri Sitarama Raju International Airport, Andhra Pradesh.

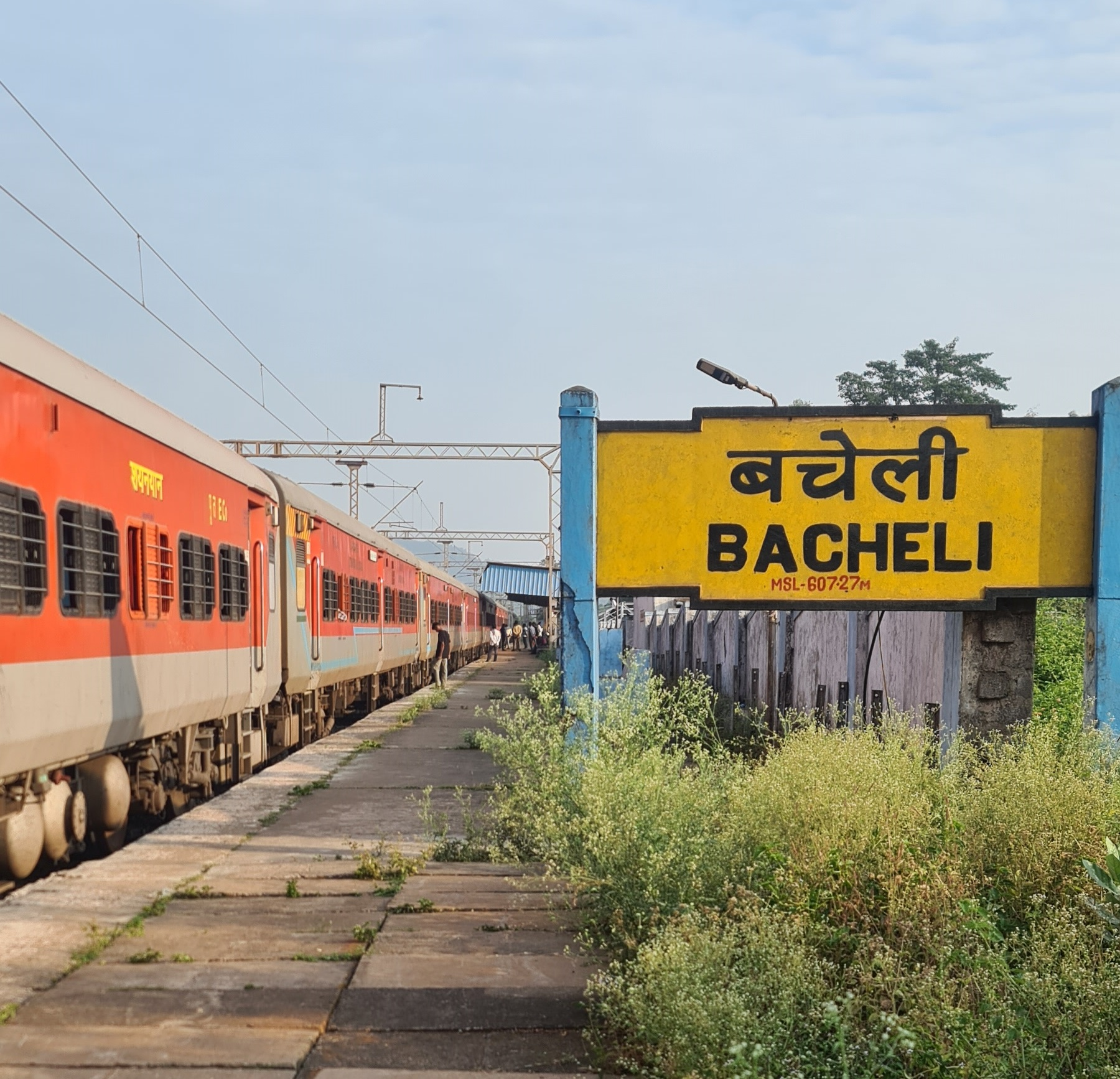
Bacheli (BCHL) Railway Station

=== Rail Transport ===
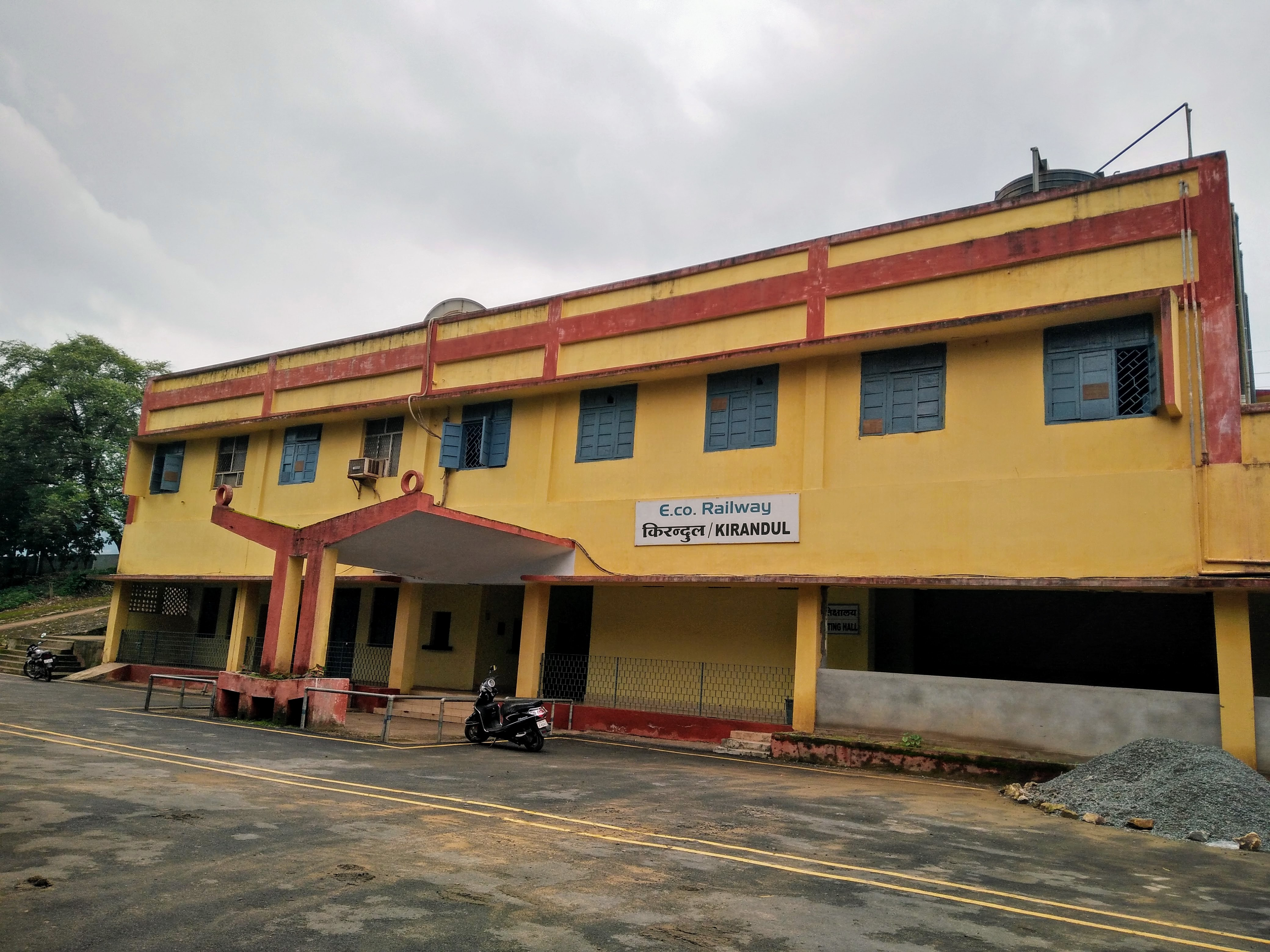
Kirandul Railway Station

The Kothavalasa–Kirandul line of East Coast Railway from Kirandul to Visakhapatnam via Koraput is laid through the Eastern Ghats. Up to Araku station, it has many tunnels. Also it pass through the highest elevation Broad gauge station in the Eastern ghats, Semiliguda, just before the Borra caves. Kirandul - Kottavalasa Railroad is the record high Broad Gauge line in the Eastern Ghats. The KK Line has the distinction of being the second highest broad gauge railway line in the country after the one in Jammu. Bacheli has a railway station with the station code BCHL and connects Bacheli to Vishakhapatnam. Indian Railways operate two trains between Kirandul and Vishakhapatnam via Bacheli - Train No: 08552/08551 - Vishakhapatnam (VSKP) - Kirandul (KDL) Special and Train No: 18513/18514 - Vishakhapatnam (VSKP) - Kirandul (KDL) Express. The 18513/18514 inaugural train was flagged off on Wed 15 Aug 2018.

A line from Kirandul to Visakhapatnam via Jagdalpur is in place mainly for the purposes of evacuation of iron ore by National Mineral Development Corporation (NMDC) from Kirandul with limited passenger trains. Plans were underway for doubling the railway line from Kirandul to Jagdalpur. As of November 2023, the work has already started for doubling the railway line from Kirandul. Indian Railways has undertaken expansion work. The cost of this is projected to be about INR 870 crore which is proposed to be initially borne by NMDC and NMDC will in turn get a rebate in the freight from Indian Railways towards the initial cost incurred by NMDC.
