= Halba (tribe) =

Total population
- c. 750,000 (2011 census)

Regions with significant populations
- Chhattisgarh, Maharashtra, Madhya Pradesh, Assam, and Odisha

Languages
- Halbi, Odia and Hindi

Religion
- Hinduism

Related ethnic groups
- Bhunjia, Indo-Aryan peoples

The Halba are a tribe in Chhattisgarh, Maharashtra, Madhya Pradesh, Assam and Odisha in India. They speak the Halbi language and are mostly engaged in farming. Linguistic evidence indicates they are an aboriginal tribe that adopted Hinduism and an Indo-European language.

The Halba ancestors were cultivators and farm servants who lived south of the Raipur district, or Kanker and Bastar State; from here, small numbers spread to Bhandara district, parts of Berar Province and into the Koraput district of Odisha.

== Etymology ==
The name Halba might be derived from hal, a plough, and be a variant of harwāha, the common term for a farm servant in the northern Districts of Central province in British India. The word ‘Halbar or Halbam in Canarse is ‘old one or ancient’ or primitive inhabitants.

== Origin ==
According to local legends, Halbas came to settle in Bastar and Kanker because they had accompanied one of the Kings of Jagannath in Odisha, who was afflicted with leprosy, to the Sihawa jungles, where he proposed to pass the rest of his life in retirement. On a certain day, the king went out hunting with his dogs, one of which was quite white. This dog jumped into a spring of water and came out with his white skin changed to copper red. The king, observing this miracle, bathed in the spring himself and was cured of his leprosy. He then wished to return to Odisha, but the Halbas induced him to remain in his adopted country, and he became the ancestor of the kings of Kanker. The Halbas are still the household servants of the Kanker family, and when a fresh chief succeeds, one of them, who has the title of Karpardar, takes him to the temple and invests him with the royal robes, affixing also the tika or badge of office on his forehead with turmeric, rice and sandalwood, and rubbing his body over with attar of roses. A Halba was also the priest of the temple at Sihawa, which is said to have been built by the first king over the spring where he was healed of his leprosy.

The first settlement of Halbas was the city of Sihawa on the banks of river Mahanadi. According to Rai Bahadur Hiralal, they might have originated between Chhattisgarh and Odisha to the east and south of the river Mahanadi. Sir Wilfred Grigson is of the opinion that the Halba seem to be the descendants of the old garrisons of Paika militia.

== History ==
The Halba tribal community is the chief tribe of Bastar region of Chhattisgarh. They adopted farming. They were employed in the militia under various ruling dynasties of the region. Halbas were also guards kings of Bastar for a long time. Subsequently, the Halbas served as soldiers in the armies of the Ratanpur kings, and their position no doubt considerably improved, so that in Bastar they became an important landholding caste. Some of these soldiers may have migrated west and taken service under the Gond kings of Chanda, and their descendants may now be represented by the Bhandara zamindars. Others took up weaving and have become amalgamated with the Koshti caste in Bhandara and Berar.

According to Das Kornel, the Halba tribe, which is found in the Korapur district of Odisha, is from the Halavur branch of Banavasi tract and is related to Western Chalukyas and came through the present Maharastra region with the invading army in the medieval period. The Anchola village of Borigumma has the Halba concentration, and it was captured by Western Chalukayas from Cholas.

=== Rebellion ===
The Halba rebellion was the first rebellion against the British in India. After the death of Dalpat Deo (1731-1774), there was a series of wars between the two sons of Dalpat Deo over the throne. Daryao Deo, the younger son of Dalpat Deo, defeated his elder brother Ajmer Singh to took over the king's crown. The Halbas rebelled during King Daryao Deo’s reign. After the decline of the Chalukyas, the situations were such that both the Marathas and the British came, one after the other, to the place in order to rule. The stronger armies of Bastar, supported by the British and Maratha, crushed the rebellion. It had already helped contribute to the decline of the Chalukya dynasty, which in turn significantly altered the history of Bastar. The rebellion was mostly defensive in nature and waged by the tribe to protect its lands and traditions. Even after defeat, Halbas were considered a tribe of considerable influence, since they could attempt to subvert the ruling dynasty.

== Society ==
The tribe has local divisions known as Bastarha, Chhattisgarhia and Marethia, according to where they live in Bastar, Chhattisgarh, or Bhandāra and the other Maharashtra Districts. The last two groups intermarry, so only the Bastar Halbas form a really separate subcaste. They are also divided into two groups of pure and mixed Halbas. These are known in Bastar and Chhattisgarh as Purait or Nekha, and Surait or Nayak, respectively, and in Bhandāra as Barpangat and Khalpangat. The Suraits or Khalpangats are said to be of mixed origin, born from Halba fathers and women of other castes.

The Halba have four subgroups: Pentia Halba, Bunkar Halba, Telia Halba and Jadi/Jadia Halba. Pentia are those who have migrated to Odisha. Bunkar are those who adopted weaving for their livelihood, Telia Halba who reside in Chhattisgarh. Weaver Halba are also known as Koshti. The population of Halba is around 0.75 million.

They have many surnames, including Som, Naik, Raut, Voyar, Nadge, Kothwar, Gharait, Chudi, Pakhle, Gawad, Hedu, Medke, Yele, Mankar, Sherkar, Margai, Chandrapur, Bhandara etc.

=== Pentia ===
Pentia Halba are found in the south of Chhattisgarh state and have spread into Koraput in Odisha. As per Administrative records, Pentia and Halba are classified as separate tribes. The Halbas of Jeypore region call themselves Pentia, whereas the Halbas in Mathli region, bordering Bastar call themselves Halba. According to Mr. C. Hayavadana Rao and Edgar Thurston, the Pentias had migrated from Bastar and settled at Pentikonna near Potangi of Koraput district, thence are known as Pentia or Pentiya or Pentikonaya. They lost a war and were in Malkangiri of Dasmantpur. The Pottangi hill Mohaprabhu is the main place of worship for Pentias as claimed. There are villages of Pentia near the Bastar border, close to Mathili and it is surprising that Pentias of Jeypore belt have no relationship with the Pentia of Bastar. At present their main occupation is cultivation in Koraput district.

Halbas have territorial and titular names and many totemistic names. They are Ghsorpatia (a horse), Kawalia (lotus), Auria (tamarind), Lendia (a tree), Gohi (lizard), Makjur (a peacock), and Bhringraj (a black bird). The Bastar totemistic groups are known as Barags and Thok. The Halba in Koraput (in Jeypore) has the following clans Bareng, Mudli, Nago, Dalaie, Sunakaria, Kaktia, Uparia, Soam, Khamaria, Dhangundia and Makad.

== Culture ==
=== Language ===
Halba speak Halbi language which is mixed language of Marathi and Odia language. According to Sir George Abraham Grierson, "Their dialect Halbi, is a curious mixture of Odia, Chhattisgarhi and Marathi the proportions varying according to the locality. In Bhandara, it is nearly all Marathi, but in Bastar it is much more mixed and has some forms which look like Telugu." Halbi dialect also contains traces of Canarese

=== Cuisine ===
Although Halba is primarily an agricultural community. Halba are also professional weaver. Many became jobless when modern powerloom methods came in the 1970s. Then, many started selling their foods which have become quite famous in Nagpur city. Their traditional food is known as Saoji, which includes Sundari, Tari Pohe, Wada Bhat, Pithla Bhakar, Jhunka Bhakar, Sabudanawada, Saoji Chicken, Patwadi Rassa, Khur Saoji, Mutton Saoji, and Kothmirwadi.

The Danteshwari Temple was established by Chalukya king in 14th century in Bastar district. They also worship other deities including Maili mata, Gusain-Pusain, Budhadeo, Kunwardeo.
