= Bijapur district, Chhattisgarh =

Coordinates: 18°45′N 80°41′E

Bijapur district
- District of Chhattisgarh
- Interactive map of Bijapur district
- Country: India
- State: Chhattisgarh
- Division: Bastar
- Headquarters: Bijapur
- Tehsils: 4

Area
  - Total: 6,562.48 km^{2} (2,533.79 sq mi)

Population (2011)
  - Total: 255,230
  - Density: 38.892/km^{2} (100.73/sq mi)

Demographics
  - Literacy: 41.58%
  - Sex ratio: 982
- Time zone: UTC+05:30 (IST)
- PIN: 4944xx (Bijapur)
- Major highways: NH-16
- Average annual precipitation: 1517 mm
- Website: bijapur.gov.in

Bijapur district, formerly known as Birjapur, is one of the 27 districts of the state of Chhattisgarh in central India. It is one of the two new districts created on May 11, 2007. As of 2011 it is the second least populous district of Chhattisgarh (out of the 18 at the time), after Narayanpur. It is the second-least literate district in India, with a literacy rate of at 41.58%, according to the 2011 census.

The present collector of Bijapur is Shri Rajendra Kumar Katara (IAS).

== History ==
Bijapur district was formerly part of the Dantewada district. It is currently a part of the Red Corridor of Naxalite activity.

== Geography ==
The Bijapur district occupies the southwestern part of Chhattisgarh. The district borders on the Narayanpur district to the north and the Dantewada district to the east. To the southwest, it borders on Telangana state, to the west on Maharashtra state. Chhattisgarh Highest Waterfall Nambi Jaldhara about 540 feet (earlier was Teerathgarh Waterfall in Dantevada about 300 feet), is located near Usur, 64 km away from Bijapur.

This district occupies an area of 6,555 km^{2}. Bijapur serves as the administrative headquarters. In total, the district comprises 675 villages.

== Transport ==
The nearest airport is at Raipur.

=== Railway ===
There is no railway station in this district as the district is situated in the western side of Bailadila Range. Railway connectivity is available to the eastern side of Bailadila Range. Nearby railway station is Dantewada, which is 92 km west of district headquarters. The track belongs to East Coast Railway zone which further connects to Jagdalpur, Jeypore and Koraput Junction .

=== Road ===
The National Highway that passes Bijapur town is the NH16. It connects Bijapur to Jagdalpur towards the east and to Nizamabad in Telangana in the west while passing through Maharashtra.

The NH 63 at Bhopalpatnam connects Bijapur to the NH 202 leading to Warangal and Hyderabad.

The towns of Bijapur and Jagdalpur connect to Nizamabad in Telangana, passing through Maharashtra. A newly constructed bridge across the river has resolved the issues caused by the old ferry system. The Indravati bridge now operates 24x7 in all weather conditions, connecting the district to the States of Maharashtra and Telangana.

Also other bridge as one goes further towards Maharashtra on the NH 16, there was another bridge missing on river Pranahita near Sironcha was also inaugurated and has been helping to cross the river while connecting the road network of the area.

== Demographics ==
Historical population
Year	Pop.	±% p.a.
1901	31,934	—
1911	43,638	+3.17%
1921	45,885	+0.50%
1931	51,450	+1.15%
1941	60,992	+1.72%
1951	71,143	+1.55%
1961	91,717	+2.57%
1971	115,107	+2.30%
1981	148,888	+2.61%
1991	196,684	+2.82%
2001	234,637	+1.78%
2011	255,230	+0.84%

Religions in Bijapur district (2011)
Religion	Percent
Hinduism	96.05%
Other (Tribal religion)	1.49%
Christianity	1.06%
Buddhism	0.64%
Islam	0.63%
Other or not stated	0.13%

According to the 2011 census, Bijapur district has a population of 255,230, roughly equal to the nation of Vanuatu. This gives it a ranking of 581st in India (out of a total of 640). The district has a population density of 39 inhabitants per square kilometre (100/sq mi). Its population growth rate over the decade 2001-2011 was 8.76%. Bijapur has a sex ratio of 982 females for every 1000 males, and a literacy rate of 41.58%. 11.60% of the population lives in urban areas. Scheduled Castes and Scheduled Tribes make up 3.97% and 80.00% of the population respectively.

Languages of Bijapur district (2011)
1. Gondi (52.2%)
2. Telugu (17.3%)
3. Dorli (9.42%)
4. Halbi (7.76%)
5. Hindi (4.78%)
6. Marathi (3.59%)
7. Chhattisgarhi (1.69%)
8. Madia (1.20%)
9. Others (2.09%)

At the time of the 2011 census, 52.17% of the population spoke Gondi, 17.30% Telugu, 9.42% Dorli, 7.76% Halbi, 4.78% Hindi, 3.59% Marathi, 1.69% Chhattisgarhi and 1.20% Madia as their first language.

== See also ==
- Villages:
  - Aaded
  - Aded
  - Bhogamguda
  - Dogoli
