= National Highway 163A (India) =

National Highway in India

National Highway 163A
- Map of the National Highway in red

Route information
- Length: 13 km (8.1 mi)

Major junctions
- North end: Geedam
- South end: Dantewada

Location
- Country: India
- States: Chhattisgarh

Highway system
- Roads in India; Expressways; National; State; Asian
← NH 63	→ NH 63

National Highway 163A, commonly called NH 163A is a national highway in India. It is a spur road of National Highway 63. NH-163A traverses the state of Chhattisgarh in India.

== Route ==
Geedam - Dantewada

== Junctions ==
NH 63 Terminal near Geedam.

== See also ==
- List of national highways in India
