= Palnar =

- village
- Location within Chhattisgarh Location within India
- Coordinates: 18°37′03″N 81°23′42″E
- Country: India
- State: Chhattisgarh
- District: Dantewada

Population (2011)
  - Total: 1,961

Languages
  - Official: Hindi, Chhattisgarhi
  - Other: Gondi, Telugu, Koya
- Time zone: UTC+5:30 (IST)
- PIN: 494552
- Telephone code: 07857
- Vehicle registration: CG-18
- Nearest city: Jagdalpur, Dantewada
- Lok Sabha constituency: Bastar
- Website: dantewada.gov.in

Palnar is a village positioned in Kuwakonda Block of Dantewada district in Chhattisgarh. Located in rural area of Dantewada district of Chhattisgarh, it is one among the 54 villages of Kuwakonda Block of Dantewada district. As per the government records, the village code of Palnar is 450279. The village has 432 houses.

According to 2011 Census of India, Palnar's population is 1961. Out of this, 943 are males whereas the females count 1018 here. This village has 277 children in the age group of 0–6 years. Out of this 127 are boys and 150 are girls.

Dantewada got Prime Minister's award for converting Palnar into a cashless village. After the 8 November demonetisation of high-value notes, Dantewada district collector Saurabh Kumar and his team managed to procure fibre and bandwidth from Essar Steel under its corporate social responsibility to create a free wi-fi zone of two and half square km area to kick start digital payments in the village market that houses 14 shops. This village is now connected digitally though it has no cellular connectivity even now.
