= Chandratiya Temple =

Shiva temple in Chhattisgarh, India

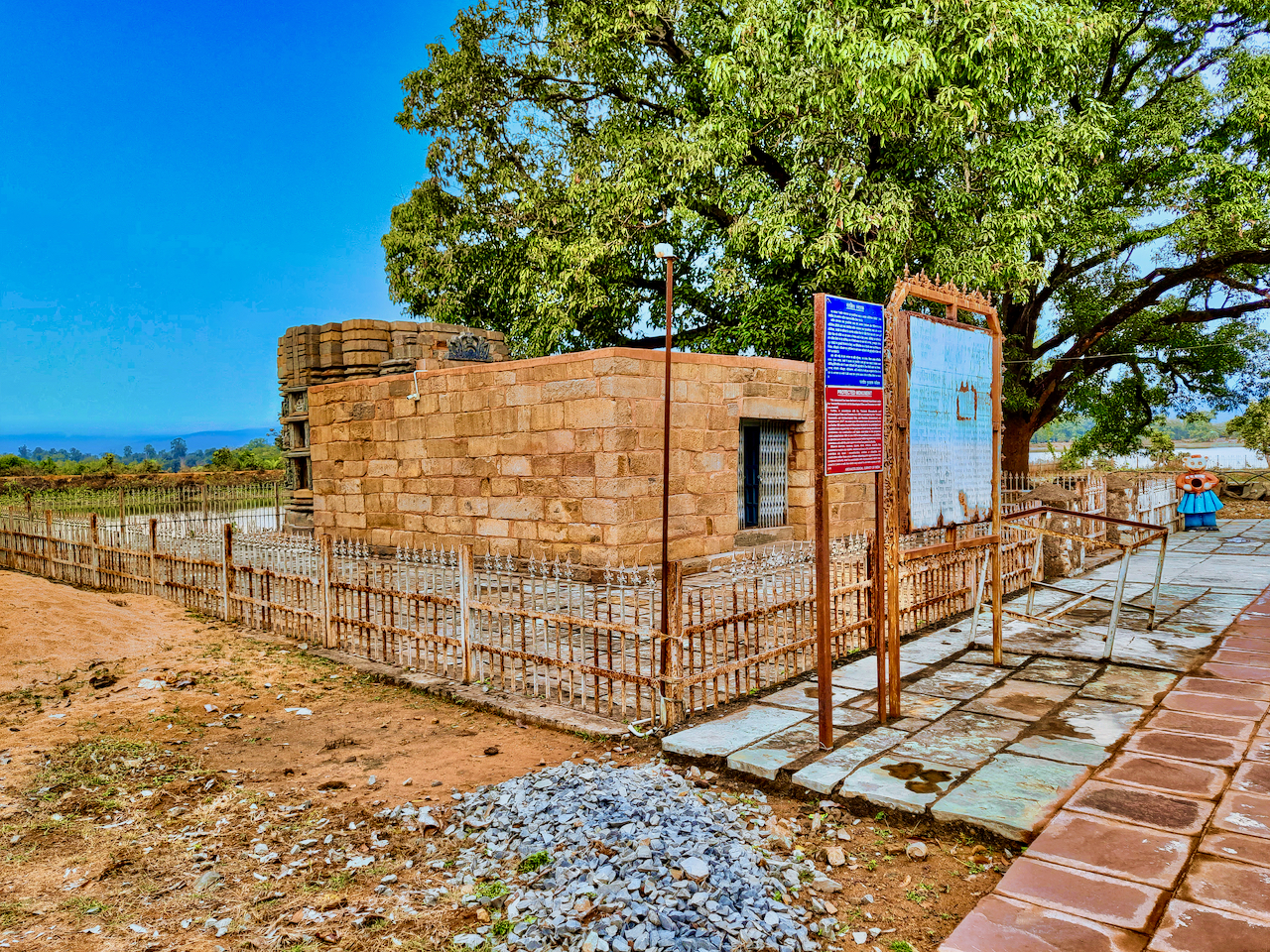
Shiva Chhattisgarh Temple

The Chandratiya Temple is a Hindu temple located in the town of Barsur, in the Dantewada district in the Indian state of Chhattisgarh. The temple is dedicated to one of the principal Hindu deities, Shiva, also known as Mahadev. Barsur is located on the bank of the Indravati River and the temple is situated on the bank of Buddha Pond. The temple is named after the Mahamandleshwar Chandraditya, who was a feudatory chief of that time.

== History ==
There is an inscription about the Barsur dated back to Shaka Samvat 983 (1068 AD) in Telugu scripts. The inscription states that Mahamandleshwar Chandraditya Maharaj, who was a chief of the Nagvanshi ruler 'Dharavarsha' and was the head of the Telugu Chodd family and Amma Village, excavated a tank and built this marvelous Shiva Temple at the center of the site. He bought a village from Rajadhiraja and donated it to meet the expenses made during temple construction.

The word Barsur is believed to be originated from Balsuri, which later became famous as Balsurgarh. In Chhattisgarh and Dandakaranya region, inscriptions and coins circulated by Nala dynasty kings have been found. A Nala dynasty king named Bhavdatt Varman gained victory over many places of southern Bastar. In 850 AD a Gangavanshi ruler from Odisha region invaded the Dandakaranya region and established his own kingdom, one of his sons started ruling over the Bastar, and made village Barsur on the banks of river Indravati, as their capital.

The influence of ancient capital can be seen on this day Gangavanshi rulers built many temples in the region among which the Chandraditya temple is temple which is still not get completely ruined.

== Architecture ==
The temple is situated near a pond named 'Buddha Talab'. The structure of the temple is built on a high platform. The sanctum or Garbhgriha is built on the platform with a squared pillared mandapa attached from the front side. An idol of Nandi can be found facing towards the sanctum. The exterior wall of the temple contains an image of Brahma and is beautifully incarnated with images of Lord Vishnu, Prajapati Daksha, Uma - Maheshvavara, erotic sculpture, and few other images of the Hindu Pantheon.

== Location ==
The temple is located about a kilometer from Battisa Temple, 21 kilometers from the Geedam Bust Station, 22 kilometers from Geedam, 27 kilometers from Geedam Railway Station, 41kilometers from Dantewada and 79 kilometers from Bastar.

There is a lake just near the temple named Buddha Talaab. The temple is situated in Barsur, which is known as city of temples. Barsur is situated near the Indravati river in Dantewada district of central Indian state Chhattisgarh.

== See also ==
- Mama Bhanja Temple is a temple in Barsur, Chhattisgarh.
- Dantewada (also known as Dantewara) is a town and a municipality, or nagar palika.
