= Kuwakonda =

- town
- Location within Chhattisgarh Location within India
- Coordinates: 18.726890°N 81.4348200°E
- Country: India
- State: Chhattisgarh
- Division: Bastar
- District: Dantewada

Languages
  - Official: Hindi, Chhattisgarhi
- Time zone: UTC+5:30 (IST)
- Vehicle registration: CG
- Coastline: 0 kilometres (0 mi)

Kuwakonda is a tehsil and the development block headquarters of Dantewada district, Bastar Division, of Chhattisgarh. Kuwakonda is located on the Dantewada–Hyderabad Road, 24 km from the district headquarters in the town of Dantewada.

== Administrative divisions ==
Kuwakonda Tehsil is divided into twenty-six gram panchayats, each one of which has jurisdiction over one or more villages.
