= Aded =

Coordinates: 18°49′N 80°41′E

- village
- Interactive map of Aded
- Country: India
- State: Chhattisgarh
- District: Bijapur

Population (2011)
  - Total: 91

Languages
  - Official: Hindi, Chhattisgarhi
- Time zone: UTC+5:30 (IST)

Aded is a village in the central state of Chhattisgarh, India. It is located in the Bijapur taluk of Bijapur district.

== Demography ==
In the 2011 census, Aded had 22 houses with a population of 91, consisting of 90 males and 81 females. The population of children aged 0–6 was 26, making up 15.20% of the total population of the village. The average sex ratio was 978 out of 1000, which is lower than the state average of 991 out of 1000. The child sex ratio in the village was 353 out of 1000, which is lower than the average of 969 out of 1000 in the state of Chhattisgarh. The total Scheduled Castes and Scheduled Tribes population in the town was 0 people and none were Scheduled Castes. There are 91 people of the Scheduled Tribe in the village.
