= Bhogamguda =

Coordinates: 18°14′N 81°38′E

- village
- Interactive map of Bhogamguda
- Country: India
- State: Chhattisgarh
- District: Bijapur

Population (2011)
  - Total: 152

Languages
  - Official: Hindi, Chhattisgarhi
- Time zone: UTC+5:30 (IST)

Bhogamguda is a village in the central state of Chhattisgarh, India. It is located in the Bijapur taluk of Bijapur district.

== Demography ==
In the 2011 census, Bhogamguda had 30 houses with a population of 152, consisting of 67 males and 85 females. The population of children aged 0–6 was 24, making up 15.79% of the total population of the village. The average sex ratio was 1,269 out of 1000, which is higher than the state average of 991 out of 1000. The child sex ratio in the village was 1000 out of 1000, which is higher than the average of 969 out of 1000 in the state of Chhattisgarh. The total Scheduled Castes and Scheduled Tribes population in the town was 0 people and none were Scheduled Castes. There are 152 people of the Scheduled Tribe in the village.
