= Padua, Koraput =

Padua
- Village
- Location in Orissa, India
- Coordinates: 18.22°N 82.42°E
- Country: India
- State: Odisha
- District: Koraput
- Time zone: UTC+5:30 (IST)

Padua is a village in Koraput district, Odisha, India. It is located on the highway route from Araku to Jeypore in Odisha, on the eastern edge of the reservoir created by Jalaput Dam.

Padua also lies on the railway route from Kirandul to Vishakhapatnam that runs between the Indian states of Chhattisgarh and Andhra Pradesh. Padua railway station is located 4 km north of the town.

As of the 2011 Census of India, it had a population of 1,487 across 394 households, with 700 males and 787 females. 632 residents were literate and 249 were six years old or younger.

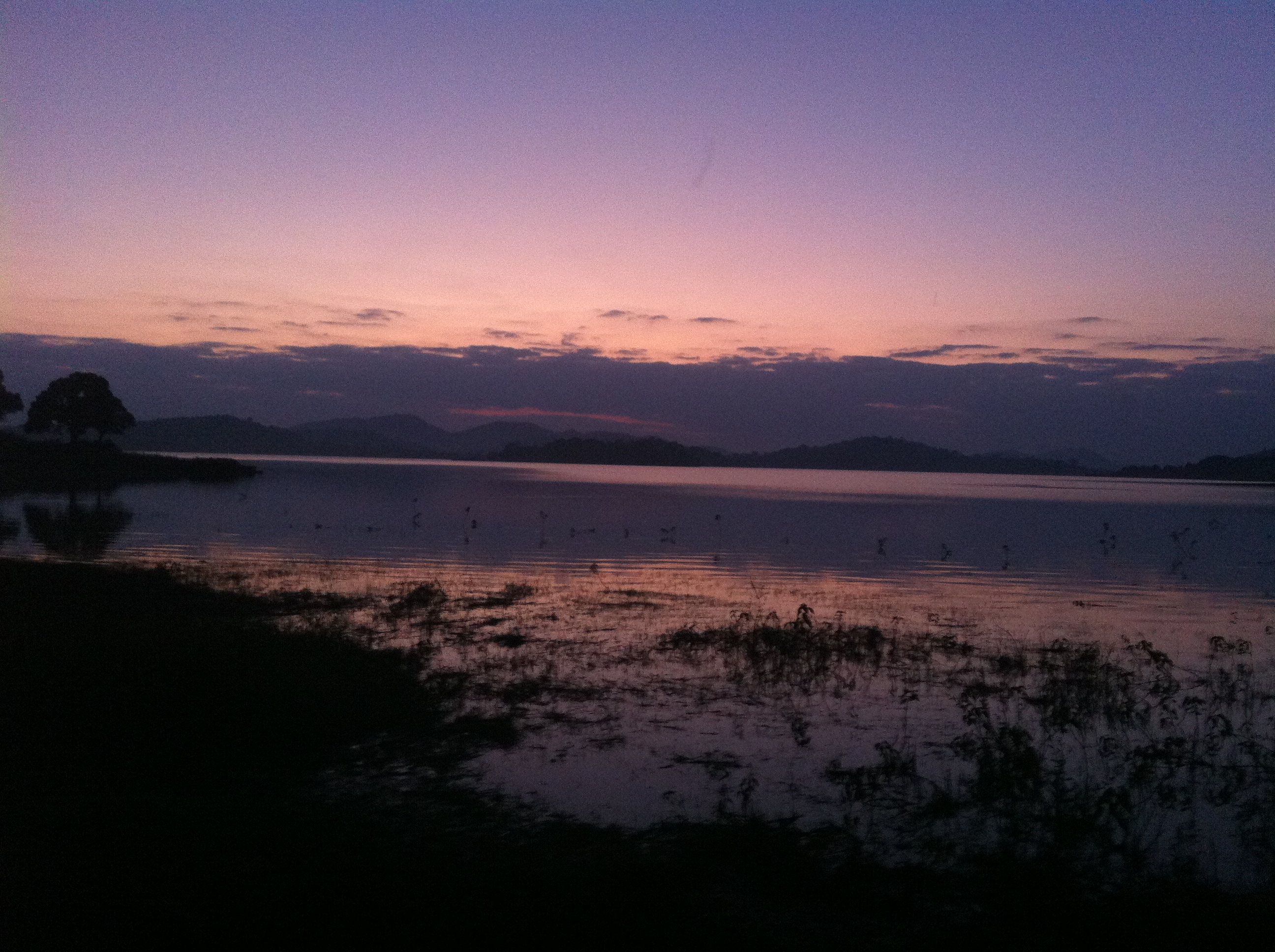
Evening view of Jolaput Lake from Padua
