= Dantewada district =

Coordinates: 18°54′N 81°21′E

Dakshin Bastar Dantewada district Dantewara district
- District of Chhattisgarh
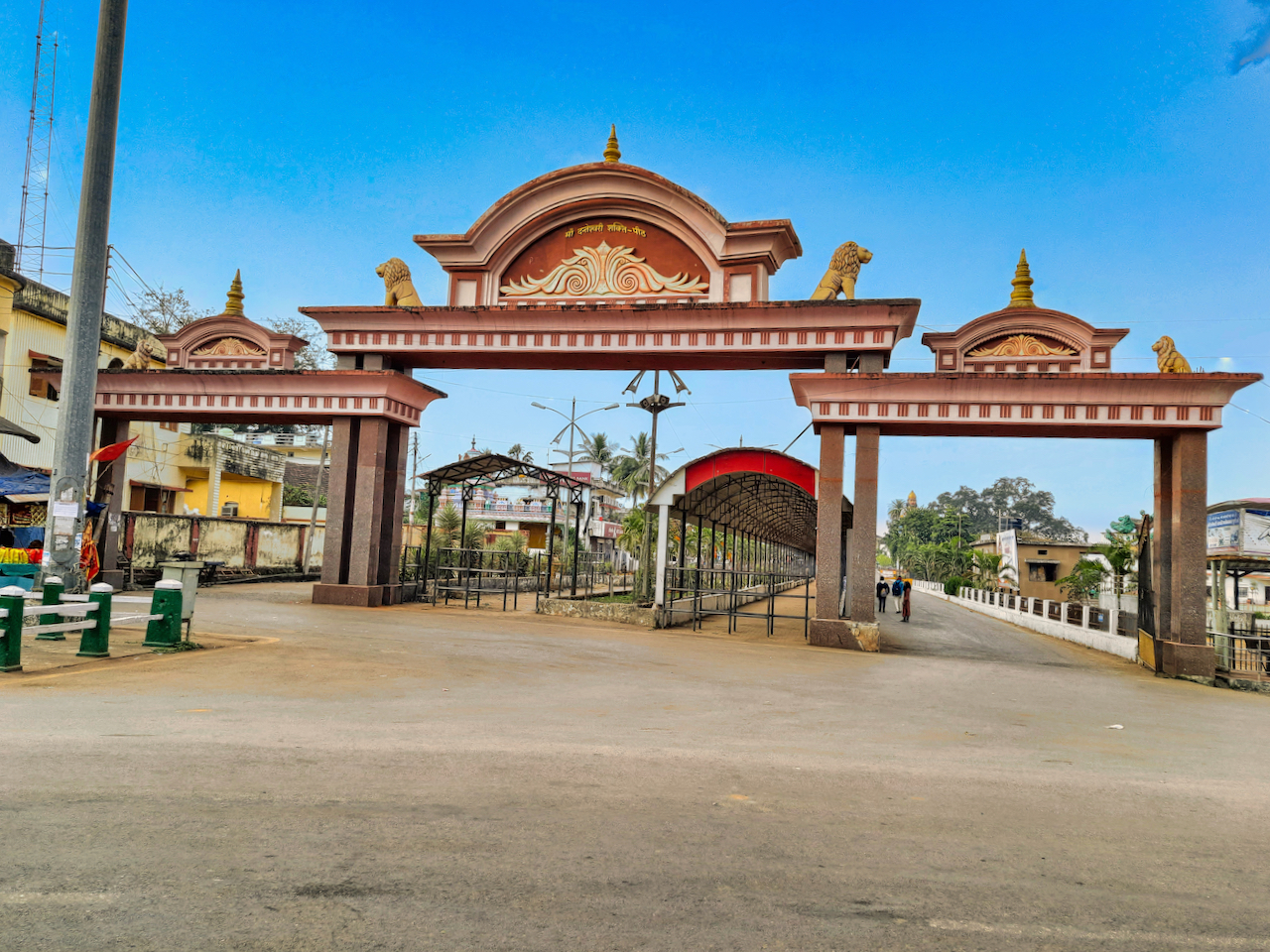
- Danteshwari Maa temple, Dantewada
- Interactive map of Dakshin Bastar Dantewada district
- Country: India
- State: Chhattisgarh
- Division: Bastar
- Headquarters: Dantewada
- Tehsils: 5

Government
  - District Collector: Shri Mayank Chaturvedi (IAS)
  - Vidhan Sabha constituencies: 1

Area
  - Total: 3,410.50 km^{2} (1,316.80 sq mi)

Population (2011)
  - Total: 283,479
  - Density: 83.1195/km^{2} (215.278/sq mi)

Demographics
  - Literacy: 42.12 per cent
- Time zone: UTC+05:30 (IST)
- Website: dantewada.nic.in

Dakshin Bastar Dantewada district, also known as Dantewara district, is a district in the Indian state of Chhattisgarh. Dantewada is the district headquarters. The district is part of Bastar Division. Until 1998, Dantewada District was a tehsil of the larger Bastar District.

As of 2011 it is the third least populous district of Chhattisgarh (out of 18), after Narayanpur and Bijapur.

The present collector of Dantewada is Shri Deepak Soni.

== History ==
Before Indian Independence, the district was part of the princely state of Bastar. After Independence in 1947, Bastar's ruler acceded to the government of India, and the erstwhile state became part of Bastar District of Madhya Pradesh state. Bastar District was divided into the districts of Bastar, Dantewada, and Kanker in 1998. In 2000, Dantewada was one of the 16 Madhya Pradesh districts that constituted the new state of Chhattisgarh. Dantewada was bifurcated in 2007, resulting in a new district Bijapur district, Chhattisgarh with four tehsils: Bijapur, Bhairamgarh, Usoor and Bhopalpatnam. It was further bifurcated in 2012, resulting in another new district, Sukma, with three tehsils: Chhindgarh, Sukma and Konta. In the Ramayana, this region is considered part of Dandakaranya .

=== Maoist terrorism ===
The district is currently a part of the Red Corridor. Over the last year, more than 350 people have been killed and 50,000 moved into camps in the Dantewada district, as a result of a Maoist uprising.

In April 2010, the Maoist terrorists killed at least 75 Indian soldiers in a series of attacks on security convoys in Dantewada. In May 2010, the Naxals targeted the Special Police Officers traveling in a civilian bus, killing around 31, to 44, including several Special Police Officers and civilians.

== Education ==
Dantewada is the worst affected Maoist region, but the students still managed to perform well in their high-school board examinations. In 2017, their pass percentage crossed 80 for the first time, making Dantewada the best performing district on the board exam.

The average literacy rate of Dantewada (Dantewara) district is 42.12 percent.

Dantewada received the Prime Minister's award for converting Palnar into a cashless village. After the November 8 demonetization of high-value notes, The then district collector Saurabh Kumar and his team managed to procure fiber and bandwidth from Essar Steel under its corporate social responsibility to create a free wi-fi zone of two and half square km area to kick-start digital payments in the village market that houses 14 shops.

== Educational Institutes ==
1- Government Danteshwari PG College Dantewada

http://www.pgcollegedantewada.com

2. College of Agriculture, Chitalanka, Dantewada

3. Kendriya Vidyalaya (KV), Dantewada

http://www.kvdantewada.com/home.php

4.Jawahar Navodaya Vidyalaya, Barsoor, Dantewada

http://www.jnvbarsoor.in

5. Govt Model Higher Secondary School, Dantewada

6. NMDC Polytechnic College Dantewada

http://nmdcdavpoly.in

== Geography ==
Dantewada District has an area of 3,410.50 km^{2}.

Encompassing with hilly tracks, dales and valleys, numerous brooks and rivers, and many forests, Dantewada is home to many species of wildlife such as the tiger, leopard, deer, bison, etc. Two species characteristic to the area are the pahadi maina and the Wild Asian Water buffalo.

Dantewada District's culture represents a unique blend of influences of Tribal, Chhattisgarhi, Oriya, Telugu & Marathi culture.

== Administrative divisions ==
Dantewada district is divided into five tehsils, and four "development blocks". It is further divided into 143 gram panchayats. The five tehsils are:

- Dantewada Tehsil, with 48 Villages
- Geedam Tehsil, with 71 Villages
- Katekalyan Tehsil, with 43 Villages
- Kuwakonda Tehsil, with 26 Villages
- Bade Bacheli Tehsil with 45 Villages

== Demographics ==
Religions in Dantewada district (2011)
Religion	Percent
Hinduism	96.92%
Christianity	1.19%
Islam	1.19%
Other or not stated	0.70%

According to the 2011 census the undivided Dantewada district had a population of 533,638, roughly equal to the nation of Cape Verde. This gives it a ranking of 540th in India (out of a total of 640). The district has a population density of 45 inhabitants per square kilometre (120/sq mi) . Its population growth rate over the decade 2001-2011 was 15.56%. Dantewada has a sex ratio of 1016 females for every 1000 males, and a literacy rate of 42.27%.

After the separation of Sukma district, the residual district has a population of 283,479, of which 68,031 (24.00%) live in urban areas. Dantewada has a sex ratio of 1023 females per 1000 males and a literacy rate of 42.12%. Scheduled Castes and Scheduled Tribes make up 3.61% and 71.07% of the district's population. The district is divided into five tehsils, Dantewada, Gidam, Kuwakonda Katekalyan, and Bade Bacheli.

Languages of Dantewada district (2011)
1. Gondi (60.1%)
2. Halbi (17.8%)
3. Hindi (9.50%)
4. Chhattisgarhi (4.26%)
5. Odia (1.98%)
6. Bengali (1.81%)
7. Telugu (1.17%)
8. Others (3.35%)

At the time of the 2011 Census of India in the divided district, 60.14% of the population in the district spoke Gondi, 17.79% Halbi, 9.50% Hindi, 4.26% Chhattisgarhi, 1.98% Odia, 1.81% Bengali and 1.17% Telugu as their first language.

== Religion ==
- Chandratiya Temple, at Barsur
