= Dogoli =

- village
- Location of Dogoli within Chhattisgarh Dogoli (India)
- Coordinates: 18.904236°N 80.840664°E
- Country: India
- State: Chhattisgarh
- District: Bijapur
- Postal code: 494444
- ISO 3166 code: IN-CT

Dogoli is a village in Bijapur district, in the Indian state of Chhattisgarh.
