= Bailadila Range =

Mountain range in India

Bailadila range
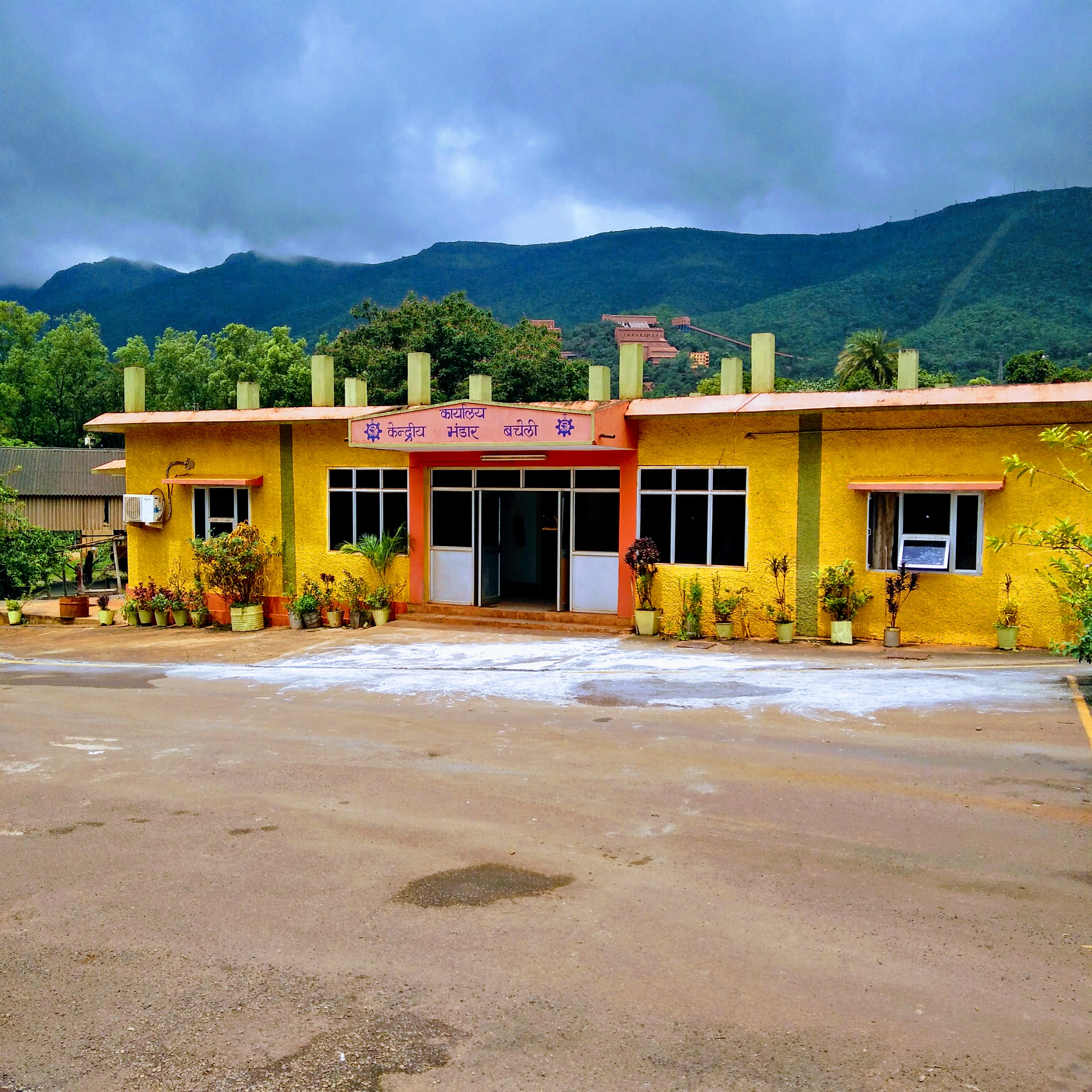
- View of Bailadila hills

Highest point
- Peak: Unnamed hill, Dantewada district, Chhattisgarh, India
- Elevation: 1,210 m (3,970 ft)
- Listing: List of Indian states and territories by highest point

Dimensions
- Length: 70 km (43 mi) SW-NE
- Width: 25 km (16 mi) NW-SE

Geography
- Location within Chhattisgarh
- Country: India
- State: Chhattisgarh
- Range coordinates: 18°42′00″N 81°13′10″E

Climbing
- Easiest route: Hike

The Bailadila range is a mountain range rising in the Deccan Plateau about 200 km west of the Eastern Ghats. It has been named 'Bailadila' because it resembles the hump of an ox. It is located near Kirandul town in the Dantewada district of southern Chhattisgarh, India.

Hematite ore is found here, which is exported from Visakhapatnam port to Japan and South Korea.

== Highest point in Chhattisgarh ==
The range is located in the northeastern area of the Deccan Plateau. It extends in a roughly SW - NE direction for a length of about 70 km south of the Indravati River. Rising to a height of 1,276 m, one of the hills of the Bailadila Range is the highest point in the state of Chhattisgarh.

The hills are located at a distance of about 40 km south west of Dantewada, the district headquarters in the state. Formerly the Bailadila slopes were thickly wooded, but the range has been a mining area producing very high grade iron ore and the mineral extraction has left many areas of the mountains scarred.

== See also ==
- Bastar State
- Geography of Chhattisgarh
- List of mountains in India
- List of mountains by elevation
