= Katekalyan =

Village in Chhattisgarh, India

- Village
- Location in Chhattisgarh, India Katekalyan (India)
- Coordinates: 18°44′42″N 81°34′50″E
- Country: India
- State: Chhattisgarh
- District: Dantewada
- Tehsil: Katekalyan
- Elevation: 595 m (1,952 ft)

Population (2011)
  - Total: 2,278

Languages
  - Official: Hindi, Chhattisgarhi
- Time zone: UTC+5:30 (IST)
- PIN: 494449
- STD code: 7858

Katekalyan is a village located in Dantewada district of Chhattisgarh, India. It serves as the administrative headquarter of Katekalyan tehsil. In the year 2011, the village had a population of 2,278.

== Geography ==
Katekalyan is situated on the eastern portion of Dantewada district, at an elevation of 595 meters above sea level. It has a total area of 471.7 hectares.

== Demographics ==
According to the 2011 census, Katekalyan had a population of 2,278 inhabitants, consisting of 1,087 males and 1,191 females. The literacy rate in Katekalyan was 49.47%, falling behind the state average of 70.28%.
