= Bastar division =

Administrative division of Chhattisgarh, India

Bastar division बस्तर संभाग
- Division
- Bastar division covers Seven districts of Southern Chhattisgarh.(Kanker, Narayanpur, Kondagaun, Bastar, Dantewada, Bijapur and Sukma).

- Location within Chhattisgarh Location within India
- Coordinates (Jagdalpur): 19.08°N 82.02°E
- Country: India
- State: Chhattisgarh
- Headquarters: Jagdalpur
- Districts: 7 (Bastar, Bijapur, Dantewada, Kanker, Kondagaon, Narayanpur and Sukma)

Population (2011)
  - Total: 2,500,000
- Time zone: UTC+05:30 (IST)
- Website: bastar.gov.in

Bastar division is an administrative unit of the Indian state of Chhattisgarh. Headquartered in Jagdalpur, it is the southernmost division of the state and is known for its rich tribal culture, dense forests, and mineral wealth.

== History ==
Bastar Division was originally part of the larger Bastar princely state. It was formally established as a division in 1999, when the historic Bastar district was subdivided into Jagdalpur (Bastar), Dantewada, and Kanker. Further administrative reforms led to the creation of Bijapur and Narayanpur in 2007, followed by Sukma and Kondagaon in 2012.

== Geography ==
The division covers a geographical area of approximately 39,117 km^{2}. It is a mineral-rich plateau region primarily drained by the Indravati River. The landscape is dominated by the Abujmarh hills and dense deciduous forests.

== Administration ==
The division is headed by a Divisional Commissioner. It consists of seven districts:

District	Headquarters	Established	Area (km²)
Bastar	Jagdalpur	1999	4,030
Dantewada	Dantewada	1999	3,411
Kanker	Kanker	1999	6,424
Bijapur	Bijapur	2007	6,555
Narayanpur	Narayanpur	2007	7,010
Kondagaon	Kondagaon	2012	7,768
Sukma	Sukma	2012	5,897

== Culture and economy ==
- Tribal Heritage: The region is home to several Scheduled Tribes, including the Gond, Maria, and Muria people. Local festivals like the Bastar Dussehra are internationally renowned.
- Resources: The division is known for the Bailadila iron ore mines, which are among the largest in the world.
- Tourism: Major attractions include the Chitrakote Falls (often called the "Niagara of India") and the Kanger Ghati National Park.

== Internal security and conflict ==
Bastar division is recognized as one of the regions most significantly affected by Left Wing Extremism (LWE) in India, primarily involving the Naxalite–Maoist insurgency.

=== Security situation ===
The division is a focal point of the Red Corridor. According to Ministry of Home Affairs statistics, the districts of Bijapur, Sukma, and Dantewada remain categorised as "Most Affected Districts." The establishment of new security camps (Forward Operating Bases) in core areas such as Abujmarh has significantly increased the presence of state functionaries in previously inaccessible zones.

=== Impact on development ===
The prolonged conflict has impacted the pace of human development in the region. However, under recent initiatives, there has been a push for:

- Education: The reopening of schools in "closed" zones and the expansion of Pota Cabins (residential schools) for tribal children.
- Infrastructure: Accelerated construction of roads and bridges under the LWE-Road Requirement Plan (RRP) to connect remote village markets (Haats).
- Health: Mobile medical units and health camps have been deployed to address the historically low health and nutrition indicators in the remote forest areas.
