= Koshta =

Regions with significant populations
- India

Languages
- Bagheli, Hindi, Marathi, Gujarati, Chhattisgarhi

Related ethnic groups
- Panika, Devanga

Kosta (also spelt as Kosti) are a Hindu caste found in the Indian states of Uttar Pradesh, Bihar, Madhya Pradesh, Chhattisgarh, Maharashtra, Gujarat and Andhra Pradesh.

== Origin ==
Koshta (Koshti) are Dewangans who are into Kosa silk business where they manufacture silk saree all across Chhattisgarh region. Koshta claim to be descendants of Markandeya Rishi. Subdivisions - The main origin of dewangan is from Raigarh Chhattisgarh where they started manufacturing silk saree as per legacy knowledge from Markandey Rishi. After successful trading to different cities of Chhattisgarh they started trading to other states as well like the neighboring Maharashtra, Madhya Pradesh, Uttar Pradesh, Odisha etc. and later all across India started Silk business and some of them converted into Koshta(Dewangan), Somewhere they known as Koshti. The caste have several subdivisions of different types. The Lad Koshtis come from Gujarat, the Gadhewal from Garha or Jubbulpore, Koshtis from Nagpur are Cultivators, Tailors and Potters, the Deshkar and Maratha from the Maratha country, while the Dewangan probably take their name from the old town of that name on the Wardha river. The Patwis are dyers, and colour the silk thread which the weavers use to border their cotton cloth. It is usually dyed red with lac. They also make braid and sew silk thread on ornaments like the separate Patwa caste. And the Onkule are the offspring of illegitimate unions. In Berar there is a separate subcaste named Hatghar, which may be a branch of the Dhangar or shepherd caste. Berar also has a group known as Jain Koshtis, who may formerly have professed the Jain religion, but are now strict Sivites. The Salewars are said to be divided into the Sutsale or thread-weavers, the Padmasale or those who originally wove the lotus flower and the Sagunsale, a group of illegitimate descent. The above names show that the caste is of mixed origin, containing a large Telugu element, while a body of the primitive Halbas has been incorporated into it. Many of the Maratha Koshtis are probably Kunbis(Cultivators) who have taken up weaving. The caste has also a number of exogamous divisions of the usual type which serve to prevent the marriage of near relatives.

== Language ==
The Koshti language is a distinct Indo-Aryan language with words derived from Sanskrit in either their tatsama or tadbhava form. Koshti also contains words borrowed from languages like Marathi, Khari-boli, Bundeli, Chhattisgarhi and variants of Hindi.

== Occupation ==
The majority of Koshta today are Darji, Potter and Cultivators and some of them have started employment other than their main occupation like in cotton and silk mills of both the public and private sectors. They have also begun to work in bidi making, brass cutlery and utensil manufacturing, tile and brick making and construction work.
