= Chhindgarh =

- town
- Country: India
- State: Chhattisgarh

Languages
  - Official: Hindi, Chhattisgarhi
- Time zone: UTC+5:30 (IST)
- PIN: 494111
- Vehicle registration: CG
- Coastline: 0 kilometres (0 mi)

Chhindgarh is a Tehsil headquarters in the District of Sukma of Chhattisgarh, India. Chhindgarh is located on the Jagdalpur - Hyderabad road.
