= Semiliguda =

- Town
- Nickname: Similiguda
- Location in Odisha, India Semiliguda (India)
- Coordinates: 18°42′25″N 82°51′11″E
- Country: India
- State: Odisha
- District: Koraput

Area
  - Total: 383 km^{2} (148 sq mi)

Population (2011)
  - Total: 81,314
  - Density: 212/km^{2} (550/sq mi)

Languages
  - Official: Odia
- Time zone: UTC+5:30 (IST)
- PIN: 764036
- Telephone code: 06853
- Vehicle registration: OD-10
- Website: odisha.gov.in

Semiliguda (also known as Similiguda) is a small town located in the Koraput district of the state Odisha, India. It is a suburb of Sunabeda Municipality. The population mainly comprises migrants from other parts of Odisha, Uttar Pradesh, Bihar, Jharkhand, West Bengal and Andhra Pradesh though there is a large presence of native Koraputiyas as well.

== History ==
Semiliguda was a small village in dense forest, inhabited by the native population of tribals. With the development of the two townships nearby: Hindustan Aeronautics Limited in 1968 and National Aluminium Company in 1981, the area witnessed rapid development and commercialization attracting a large number of people to come and set up their businesses here. The early migrants to Semiliguda were relatives of the people who used to work in the nearby townships. However, it soon emerged as an attractive commercial prospect for people as a market for both the townships as well as several small tribal villages in the adjoining area.

Semiliguda is one of the coldest regions in the state of Odisha and the entire Eastern Ghats where the temperatures can drop as low as 2°C in the winters. It is also known for a variety of flora and fauna including Sloth bears, Pythons, Wolves and foxes.

This area is also known for its agricultural produce including Ginger, Rice, Mulberry, Jackfruits and Sugarcane.

== Population ==
According to the 1961 census, the population of Semiliguda village was 848. According to the 2011 census of India, the population of Semiliguda block was 22,247.

== The boom of the illegal gemstones business ==
One of the events that resulted in a drastic economic and population boom of Semiliguda was the boom of the illegal business of gemstones trading in the mid-1990s. The local businessmen collaborated with tribal working in the nearby mines and quarries that yielded catseye. Several local businessmen especially those from the Marwari community who had settled in Semiliguda entered this trade and made a fortune. This trade resulted in a sudden economic boom of the overall area and soon the lifestyle standards as well as the population of the region spiked up.

== Present day ==
Semiliguda has emerged as one of the prominent towns in South Odisha with rapid commercial growth and an increase of migrants from other districts of the state and other neighboring states. While the majority of the population are Odias, the demography of the region comprises a number of people from various states and ethnicity. A number of colleges including Semiliguda college, Jeevan Jyoti Convent School - an ICSE school and many CBSE schools such as D'Mount Valley School, Netaji English Medium School, and Deomali Public School along with Samanta Chandrasekhar Institute of Technology and Management - an engineering college have been established to provide higher education to the people.

With several amenities and huge business opportunities, Semiliguda is a potential hub for South Odisha and its tribal population. The area has already seen growth of modern amenities like multiplex screens and shopping malls.

== Naxalism ==
Semiliguda has been a victim of the Naxalism, with several incidents of business men being killed, or threatened for ransom, by the Naxals. Such violence has resulted in a slowing of development in Semiliguda. The situation in Semiliguda went worse by the mid 2000s, however, it got much better with the central government's crackdown on Naxalites. The town returned to normalcy by early 2010s and has seen a huge increase in economic activity, business and land prices since then.

== Places around Semiliguda ==
Places around Semiliguda like Dudhari, Pakjhola, Deomali and Machkund are known for their natural environment and beauty. It is in the main NH linking from Raipur in Chhattisgarh to Visakhapatnam in Andhra.

== Famous people of Semiliguda ==
- Jayaram Pangi – Shri Jayaram Pangi has been one of the eminent politicians staying in the Kundli block of Semiliguda and has held several ministries in Government Of Odisha. He has held several portfolios including Minister of State for Agriculture, Minister of State for Cooperation and Minister of State, Excise (Ind. charge).
- Pitam Padhi – Belonging to the Pakjhola block of Semiliguda, Pitam Padhi serves as the current representative in the Odisha Legislative Assembly.
- Krushna Singh – An eminent leader of the Sarvodaya leader, Krushna Singh played a key role in establishing the Samanta Chandrasekhar Institute of Technology and Management.
- Bishnu N Singh – Born and brought in Semiliguda, Bishnu Narayan Singh is the first person from Semiliguda to hold a professional mass communication degree. He was a gold medalist in Mass Communication at Amity University. He is one of the renowned motorbikers of India known for accomplishing several challenging motorcycle rides in the Indian Himalayas and riding on some of the world's most dangerous roads.
- Suman Khilo – Hailing from Semiliguda, Suman Khilo, a tribal girl from Koraput district acted in a south blockbuster movie ‘Mangalavaaram’, directed by Ajay Bhupati.
- Anupriya Lakra – Belonging to the nearby Malkangiri district, Anupriya Lakra received her education and spent her childhood in Semiliguda. She became the first woman pilot from Odisha's tribal region.

== Temples in Semiliguda ==
Semiliguda is home to several temples that reflect the region's rich cultural and religious heritage. Here's an overview of the types of temples you can find in Semiliguda:

=== Some Prominent Temples are as follows ===
1. Maa Dhana Raagini Banadurga Temple
2. Sri Ram Temple
3. Sri Agni Ganga Maa Temple
4. Siddheshwar Temple
5. Maa Tarini Temple
6. Sri Gangamaa Budhi Thakurani Temple Kodigaon
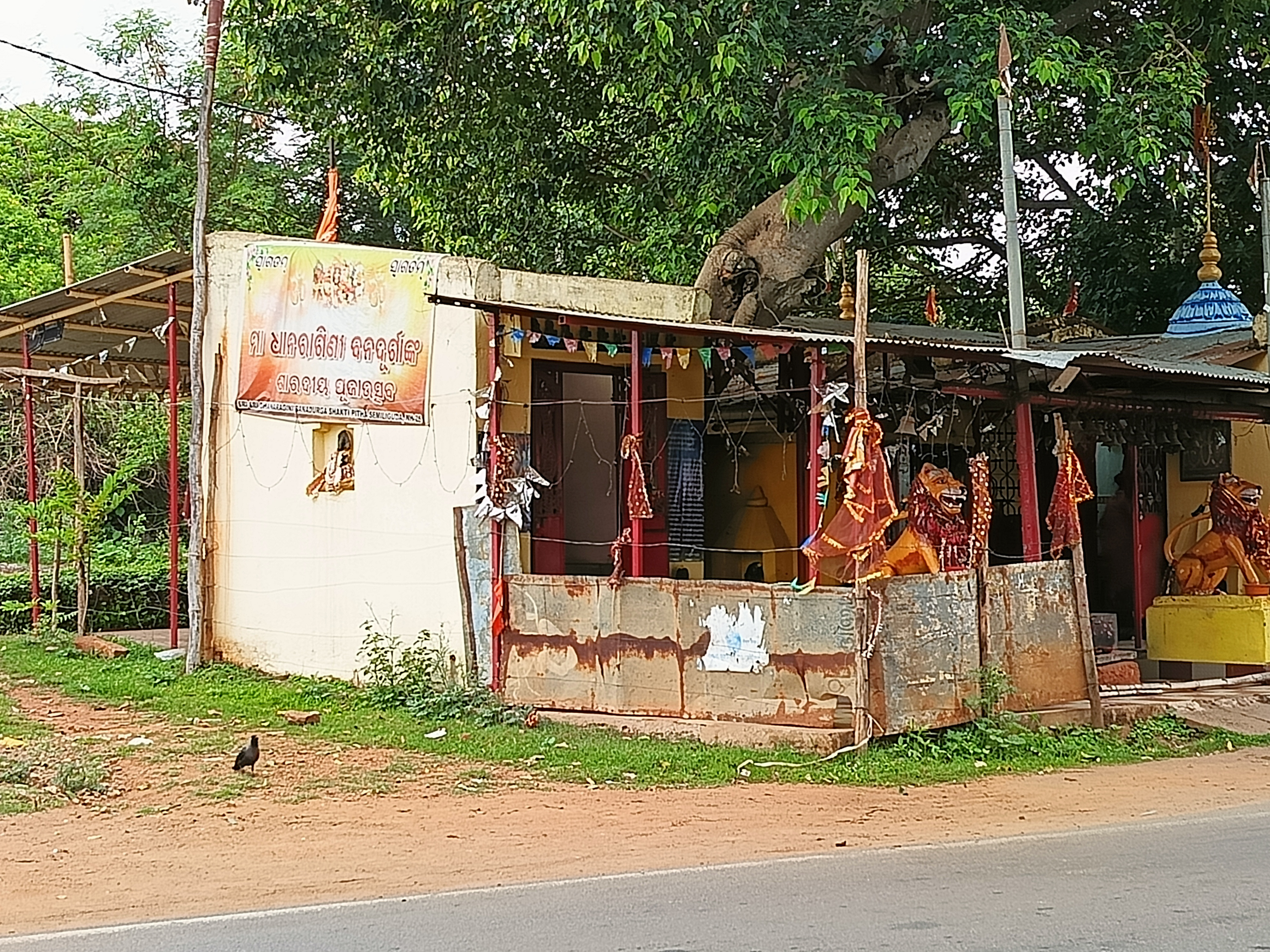
Maa Dhana Raagini Banadurga Temple

Sri Ram Temple

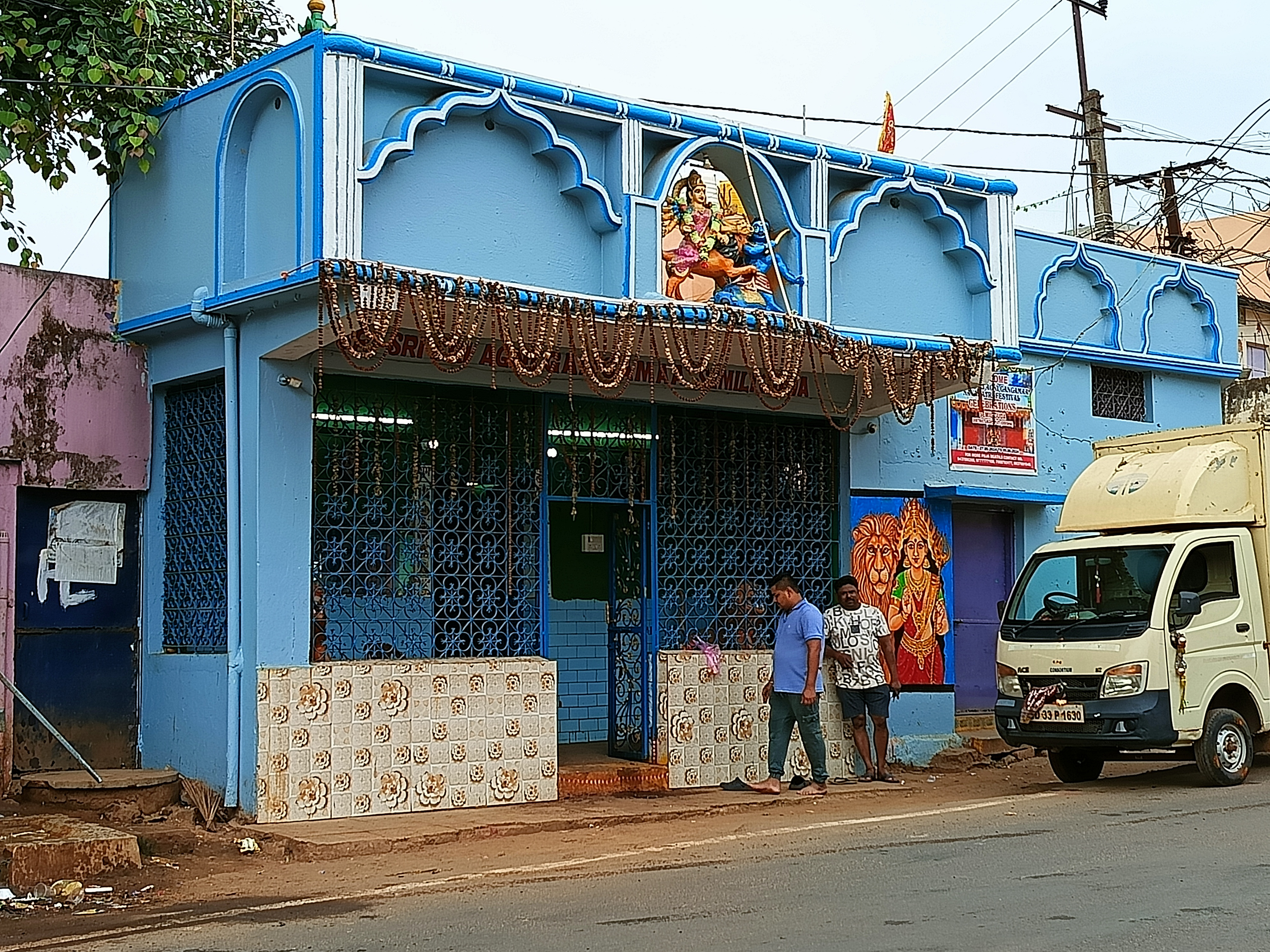
Sri Agni Ganga Maa Temple

Siddheshwar Temple

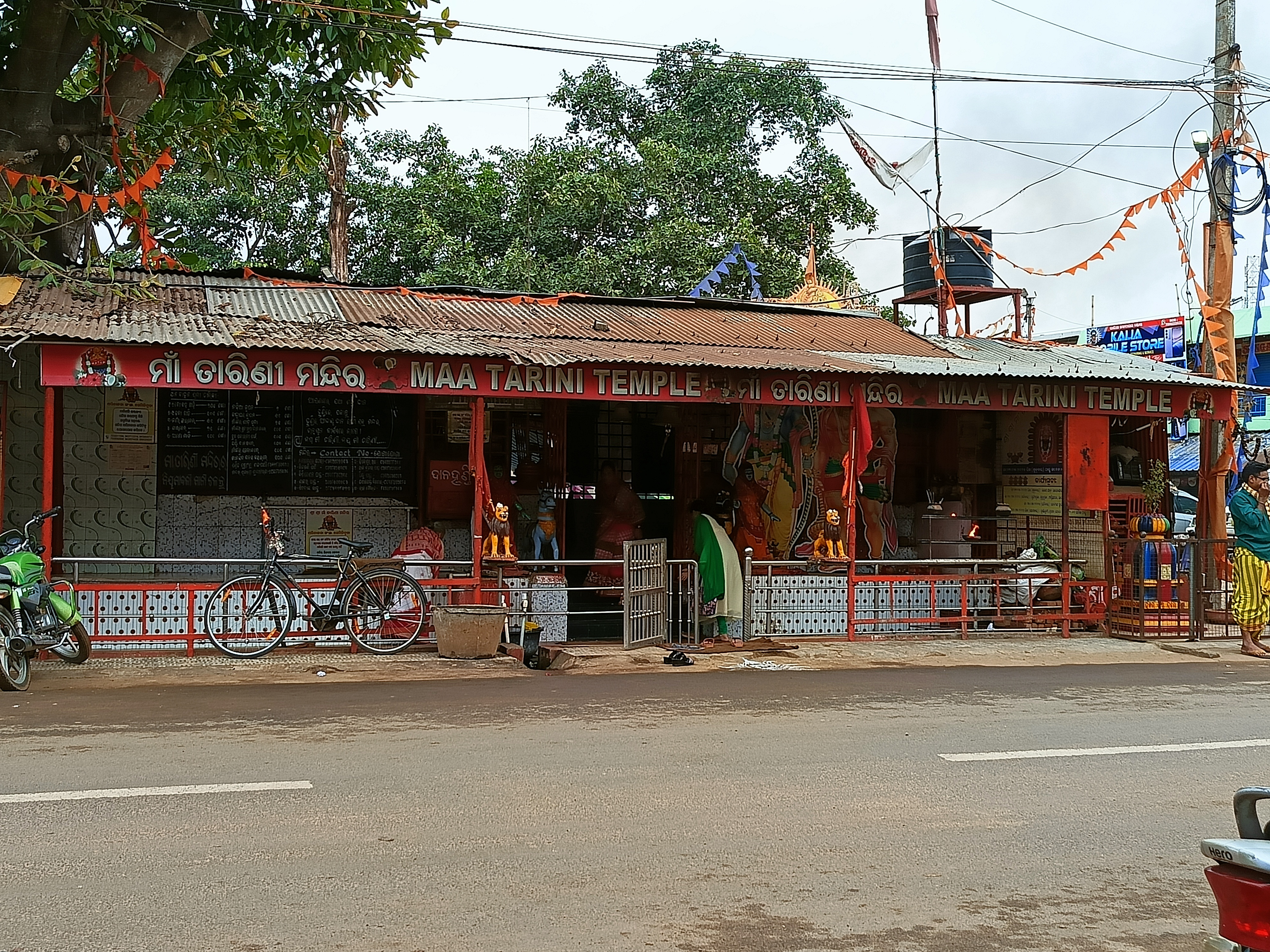
Maa Tarini Temple

Sri Gangamaa Budhi Thakurani Temple Kodigaon

== Government Buildings in Semiliguda ==
Semiliguda hosts several key government buildings that facilitate the town's administrative, educational, healthcare, and public safety services.

Some Prominent Buildings are:

1. Tahsil Office
2. Gram Panchayat Office
3. Forest Range Office
4. Jr. JMFC Court
5. Urban Primary Health Care Center
6. Govt. High School
7. Semiliguda Sub Post Office
8. Kodigaon Primary School
9. Purbatana Bodha Primary School
Semiliguda Sub Post Office

Kodigaon Primary School

Urban Primary Health Care Centre

Government High School

Forest Range Office

Jr. JMFC Court Semiliguda

Gram Panchayat Office

Tahsil Office

== Mixed Farming Project in Semiliguda ==
In 1963, the Odisha government established a mixed farming project in Semiliguda, covering 352.6 hectares of land, with 164 hectares dedicated to cultivation.
