= Geedam =

- Census town
- Location within Chhattisgarh Location within India
- Coordinates: 18.98°N 81.40°E
- Country: India
- State: Chhattisgarh
- District: Dantewada

Government
  - Type: tehsildar
  - Body: tehsil
- Elevation: 381 m (1,250 ft)

Population (2011)
  - Total: 45 025

Languages
  - Official: Hindi, Chhattisgarhi
- Time zone: UTC+5:30 (IST)
- PIN: 494441
- Vehicle registration: CG-18

Geedam is a census town and tehsil in Dantewada district in the state of Chhattisgarh, India. It is situated in National highway number 63 (previously numbered as national highway 16) about 75 km from Jagdalpur. It is a town between the Bijapur-Jagdalpur NH63 route. About 15 km away from Dantewara City. It has a railway station about 3 km from the proper town and a helipad just 1km away from the town. Bus connectivity for Raipur (State Capital), Jagdalpur City, Vishakapatnam City, Hyderabad City, Dantewara, Bijapur, Sukma, Bhopalpatnam, Barsoor and Kirandul is available.

== Geography ==
Geedam is located at 18.98°N 81.40°E. It has an average elevation of 381 m (1,250 ft).

== Educational Institutions ==
Govt Higher Secondary School, Geedam, Dantewada Aastha Vidya Mandir School, Edu City, Geedam DAV MM Public School, Edu City, Geedam NMDC DAV Polytechnic College, Geedam SAKSHAM School Geedam Eklavya School, Geedam ITI, Geedam Kanya Shala School, Edu City, Geedam Saraswati Shishu Mandir, Geedam Gayatri Vidyapeeth, Geedam Nirmal Kids School, Haram, Geedam Kasturba Gandhi girls school, Edu City, Geedam.

== Demographics ==
As of 2011 India census, Geedam had a population of 7,440. Males constitute 50% of the population and females 50%. Geedam has an average literacy rate of 65%, higher than the national average of 59.5%: male literacy is 74%, and female literacy is 56%. In Geedam, 14% of the population is under 6 years of age.People follow different religions like Hinduism, Jainism, Christianity, Islam and Sikhism. This town also have an Education City with more than 10 educational institutions and hostels. Most of the Schools and Colleges provide free quality education.
