= Bijapur, Chhattisgarh =

Bijapur
- town
- Location in Chhattisgarh, India Bijapur (India)
- Coordinates: 18°47′30″N 80°49′0″E
- Country: India
- State: Chhattisgarh
- District: Bijapur

Languages
  - Official: Hindi, Halbi
- Time zone: UTC+5:30 (IST)
- Vehicle registration: CG 20

Bijapur is a town in Bijapur district, Chhattisgarh, India. It is the seat of the district and one of the 4 taluks in Bijapur district. The Bijapur taluk has an area of 928 km^{2} and 60,055 inhabitants (2001 census). It is situated on the National Highway 63 which connects Nizamabad in Telangana with Jagdalpur in southeastern Chhattisgarh.
