= Halbi language =

Indo-Aryan language spoken in India

Halbi
- हलबी / ହଲବୀ
- Native to: India
- Region: Bastar Division, Odisha, Andhra Pradesh, and Maharashtra
- Ethnicity: Halba
- Native speakers: 766,297 (2011 census)
- Language family: Indo-European: Indo-Iranian; Indo-Aryan; Eastern; Halbic; Halbi
- Writing system: Odia, Devanagari

Language codes
- ISO 639-3: hlb
- Glottolog: halb1244 Halbi
- Linguasphere: 59-AAF-tb
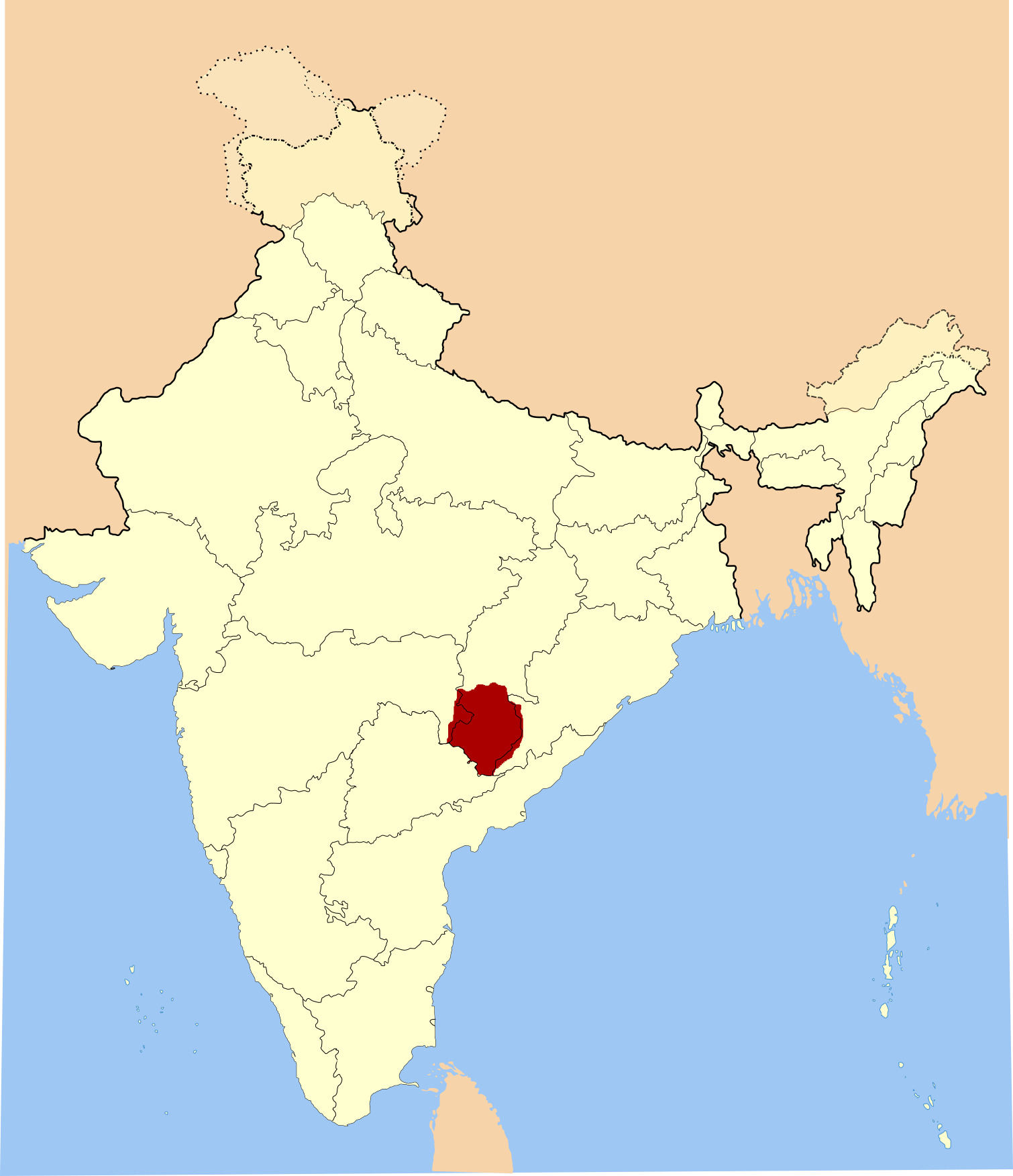
- Halbi-speaking region

Halbi (also Bastari, Halba, Halvas, Halabi, Halvi) is an Eastern Indo-Aryan language variety, transitional between Odia and Marathi. It is spoken by at least 766,297 people across the central part of India.

The Mehari (or Mahari) dialect is mutually intelligible with the other dialects only with difficulty. There are an estimated 200,000 second-language speakers (as of 2001). In Chhattisgarh educated people are fluent in Hindi. Some first language speakers use Bhatri as a second language.

Halbi is often used as a trade language, but there is a low literacy rate. It is written in the Odia and Devanagari scripts. It uses SOV word order (subject-object-verb), makes strong use of affixes, and places adjectives before nouns.

== Phonology ==
=== Vowels ===
Halbi has 6 vowels: /i, e, ə, a, o, u/. All vowels show contrastive vowel nasalization.

=== Consonants ===
		Labial	Alveolar	Retroflex	Palatal	Velar	Glottal
Nasal	voiced	m	n	(ɳ)	(ɲ)	ŋ	
Nasal	breathy	mʱ	nʱ				
Stop/ Affricate	voiceless	p	t	ʈ	tʃ	k	
Stop/ Affricate	aspirated	pʰ	tʰ	ʈʰ	tʃʰ	kʰ	
Stop/ Affricate	voiced	b	d	ɖ	dʒ	g	
Stop/ Affricate	breathy	bʱ	dʱ	ɖʱ	dʒʱ	gʱ	
Fricative			s				h
Approximant	voiced	ʋ	l		j		
Approximant	breathy		lʱ				
Rhotic	voiced		r	(ɽ)			
Rhotic	breathy		rʱ	(ɽʱ)			

- /n/ is heard as a palatal [ɲ] when preceding palatal affricates, and as retroflex [ɳ] when before retroflex stops.
- Voiced retroflex stops /ɖ, ɖʱ/ are heard as retroflex flaps [ɽ, ɽʱ] when in word-medial positions.
