= Essar Steel =

Common name of the steel companies of the Essar Group

Essar Steel was a common name of the steel manufacturing companies of the Essar Group of Companies. Its main subsidiary was Essar Steel India Limited, a fully integrated flat carbon steel manufacturer based in Mumbai, which owned and operated a integrated steel plant in Hazira, Surat district of Gujarat state. In addition, it had also a beneficiation plant at Bailadilla, Chhattisgarh, and pellet plants at Visakhapatnam, Andhra Pradesh, and Paradeep, Odisha. There was an integrated steel plant under construction in Paradeep.

After insolvency, Essar Steel India Limited was acquired by ArcelorMittal Nippon Steel India Limited.

== History ==
History of the company reach back to 1 June 1976 when specialised marine construction company Essar Construction Limited was incorporated as a part of Essar Group. Essar Steel was a division of Essar Construction, responsible for manufacturing of hot briquetted sponge iron. On 19 August 1987, the company changed its name to Essar Gujarat Limited and on 4 December 1995, to Essar Steel Limited.

In 1994–1995, a new plant for manufacture of hot rolled coils was commissioned in Hazira. A pelletisation plant was set up at Visakhapatnam. P.T. Essar Dhananjaya joint venture was formed in Indonesia for manufacturing of cold rolled products.

In 2003, Essar in cooperation with Stemcor set up a cold rolled steel unit.

In 2007, Essar acquired the Canadian steel mill Algoma Steel.

On 18 January 2012, the company changed its name to Essar Steel India Limited.

== Insolvency ==
The account had gone into corporate debt restructuring in 2002, with a debt of Rs 2,800 crore, according to an Economic Times report. However, it managed to exit the CDR ahead of schedule in 2006.

A new cycle of distress began after the rapid expansion at Essar Steel’s Hazira steel operations at the turn of the decade. The expansion plan failed due to delay in environmental approvals and non-availability of natural gas, which was necessary for the plant to work at maximum efficiency. By 2015, the company was saddled with financial creditor dues exceeding Rs 49,000 crore. That year, the lenders made a first attempt to get the promoter family out of the driving seat at the company. At the time, the company was facing severe liquidity issues because of a drop in commodity prices and a failed expansion plan at its Hazira steel plant. At a meeting in November 2015, the lenders to Essar Steel, led by State Bank of India and ICICI Bank, had discussed the option of converting a portion of the company’s debt into majority equity, which could be sold to potential investors later.

However, the plan was put on hold after the Ruia family told the lenders that they were willing to sell the company through an M&A process. The lenders appointed SBI Capital Markets and ICICI Securities as investment bank to look for potential buyers, however, they failed to find investor. While the search for a new bidder was on, the RBI concluded its asset quality review and asked banks to classify multiple large accounts, including Essar Steel, as non-performing assets by March 2016.

In October 2016, Essar Steel submitted a resolution plan to its lenders. It involved Rs 1,700 crore equity infusion from U.S.-based hedge fund in exchange for 24 percent equity in the company. The plan also involved conversion of a portion of the company’s debt into 36 percent equity to be held by the lenders. in June 2017, lenders had received a list of 12 stressed accounts from the RBI for immediate insolvency action under newly enacted insolvency Code. Essar Steel’s name featured among the largest of the 12 accounts. Insolvency became a reality. The account was finally admitted to the National Company Law Tribunal in August 2017.

As per order of National Company Law Tribunal (NCLT) dated 2 August 2017, Essar Steel was admitted into insolvency proceedings and Mr. Satish Kumar Gupta was appointed as Interim Resolution Professional by NCLT. Mr. Satish Kumar Gupta was appointed as the Resolution Professional (RP) on 1 September 2017. RP issued Expression of Interest on 6 October 2017 and issued Request for Proposal on 24 December 2017. Accordingly, two Resolution Plans were received on 12 February 2018 from ArcelorMittal and Numetal. The Resolution Professional, after evaluating the Plans under Section 29A of IBC, held that both Resolution Applicants were ineligible. Same was challenged before NCLT.

National Company Law Appellate Tribunal (NCLAT) passed its order on 7 September 2018 and upheld the resolution professional’s view that the first round of bids submitted in February 2018 were ineligible. Above was challenged by ArcelorMittal in the Hon'ble Supreme Court.

On 4 October 2018, the Hon'ble Supreme Court gave its order thereby removing the ambiguity over the interpretation of the Section 29A of IBC and also upheld the ineligibility decision of the Resolution Professional but also gave another chance to both parties to clear any past outstanding dues and resubmit the Resolution Plan. Thereafter, ArcelorMittal cleared the dues to the tune of about Rs 7,500 crore to lenders of Uttam Galva and KSS Petron to become eligible to bid for ESIL. Thereafter, the Committee of Creditors of ESIL evaluated plans of ArcelorMittal and Vedanta and declared Resolution Plan of ArcelorMittal as H1. Post negotiation with ArcelorMittal, CoC approved the Resolution Plan of ArcelorMittal on 25 October 2018.

Essar Steel's Resolution Plan was approved on 8 March 2019 with certain modifications with respect to distribution by the National Company Law Tribunal (NCLT). Post-approval of Resolution Plan by NCLT, a monitoring committee (MC) of ESIL was formed with ex RP, Mr. Satish Kumar Gupta as Chairman and 4 representatives from Financial Creditors and 3 representative from ArcelorMittal as members.

Above NCLT approval was challenged by certain Financial Creditors and Operational Creditors in NCLAT. After hearing these parties, NCLAT approved the Resolution Plan of ArcelorMittal on 4 July 2019 with certain modifications. NCLAT judgment was further challenged by CoC and financial creditors on the issue of distribution approved by NCLAT. By its judgment dated 15 November 2019, the Supreme Court approved the Resolution Plan of ArcelorMittal.

Above plan was implemented by ArcelorMittal on 16 December 2019 with payment as per plan and Essar Steel was acquired by ArcelorMittal Nippon Steel India Limited, a joint venture between ArcelorMittal and Nippon Steel Corporation. Mr. Aditya Mittal, President and CFO of ArcelorMittal has been appointed as Chairman of ArcelorMittal Nippon Steel and Mr. Dilip Oommen as CEO. Mr Aditya Mittal said that the acquisition gives us opportunity to contribute to India's expansion in infrastructure and urbanisation in coming decades.

The company's US subsidiary declared bankruptcy amid allegations of fraud in late 2015.

== List of Steel Plants ==
- ESSAR Steel India Limited, a fully integrated steel mill in Hazira, of the Surat district in Gujarat, India, with a steel-making capacity of 10 MTPA.
- Essar Steel Minnesota LLC, a company located in U.S. state of Minnesota, was declared bankrupt and its assets and mining rights sold in June 2017.
- Greenfield projects in Vietnam.
- Steel plant in Indonesia.
- Integrated steel plant in Trinidad and Tobago. It has a current capacity of 10 MTPA which they plan to raise to 20 MTPA by 2028.

== See also ==
- ESSAR Steel India Limited — Essar Steel in India
