= Dantewada =

Dantewada Dantewara
- Town
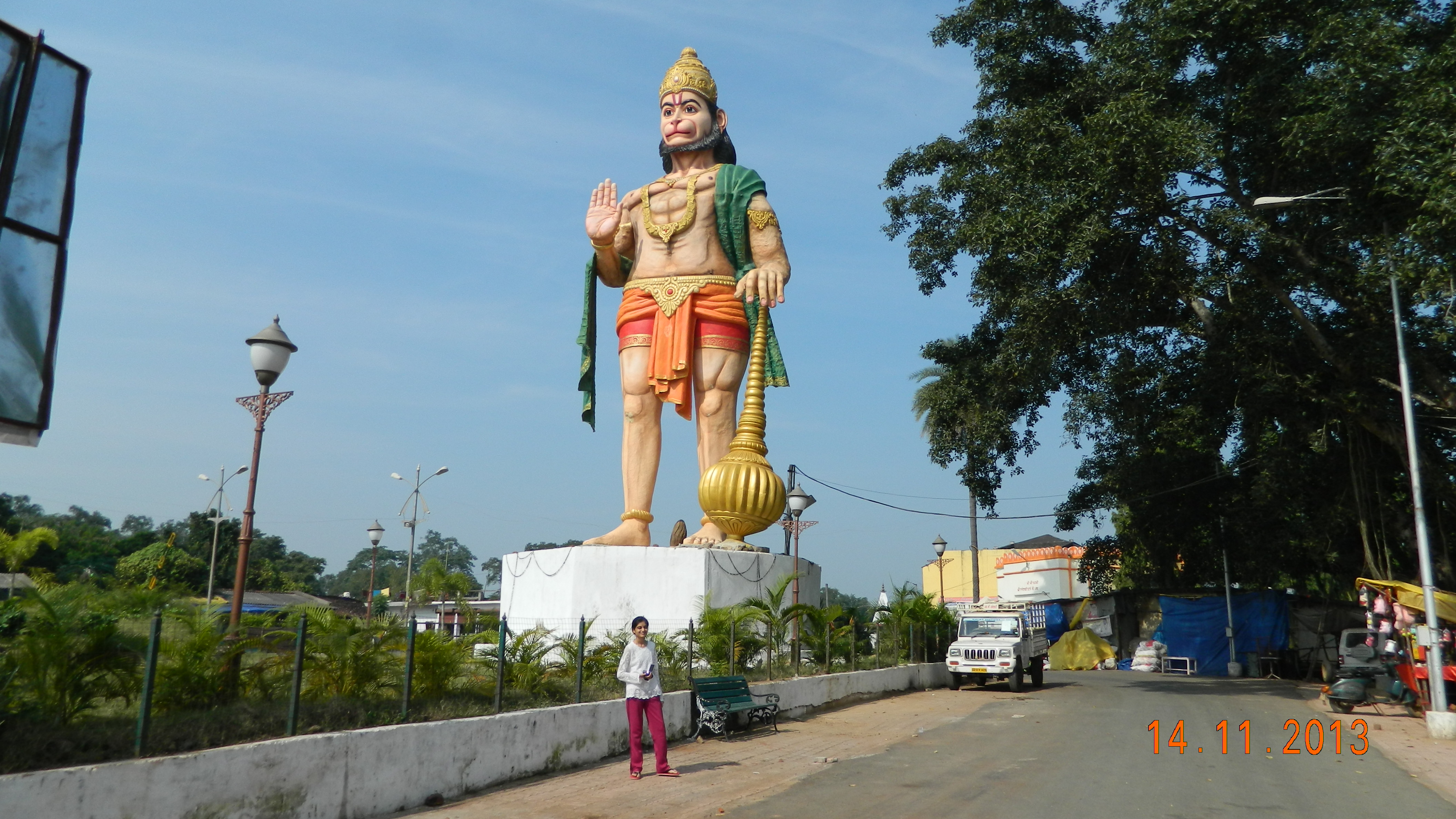
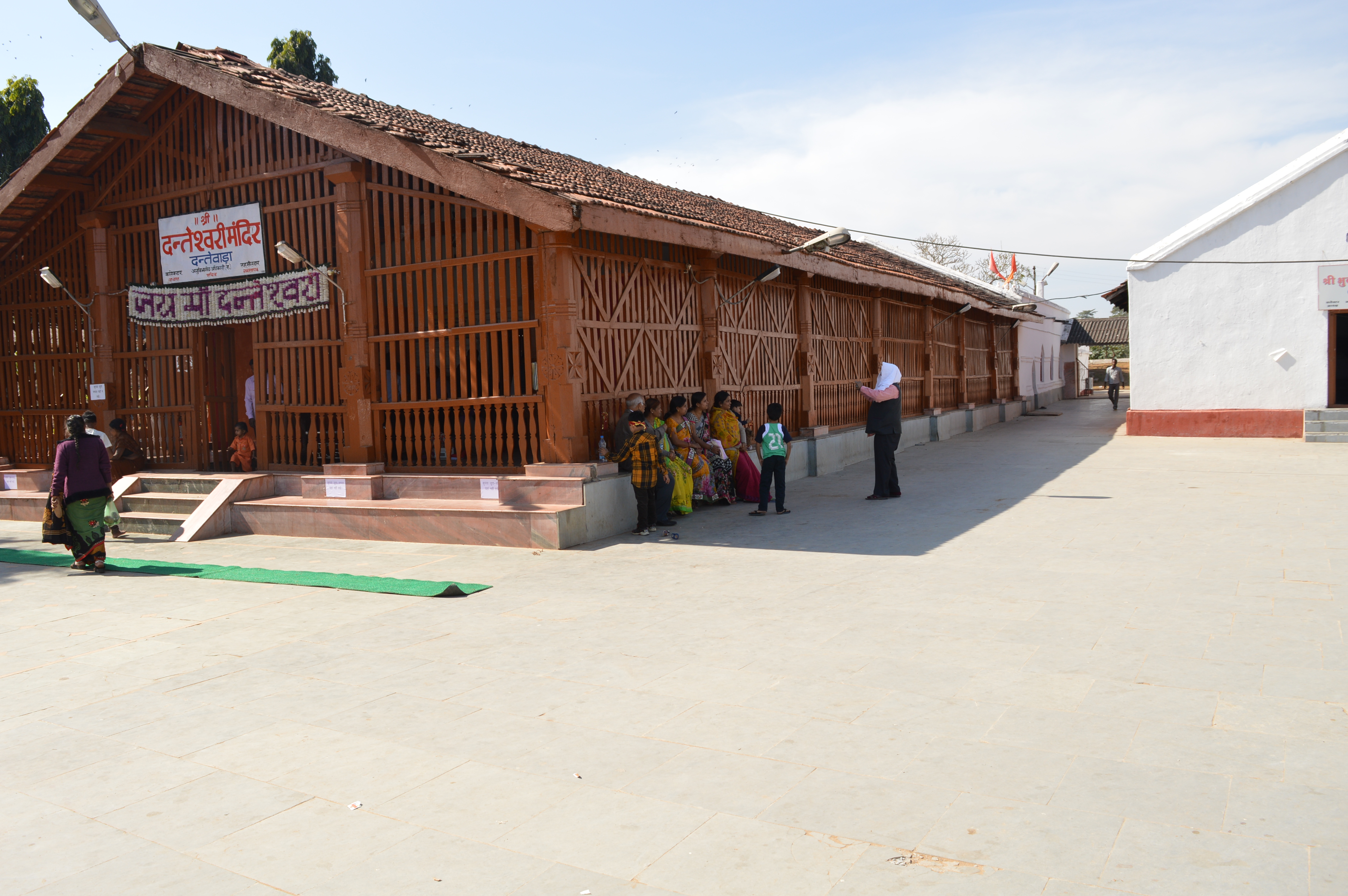
- Danteshwari Mai Mandir

- Location within Chhattisgarh Location within India
- Coordinates: 18.9000°N 81.339°E
- Country: India
- State: Chhattisgarh
- Division: Bastar
- District: Dantewada
- Elevation: 351 m (1,152 ft)

Population (2011)
  - Total: 13,633

Languages
  - Official: Hindi, Halbi
  - Regional: Gondi, Halbi
- Time zone: UTC+5:30 (IST)
- PIN: 494xxx (Dantewada)
- Vehicle registration: CG-18

Dantewada (also known as Dantewara) is a town and a municipality (Nagar Palika) in the state of Chhattisgarh, India. It is the administrative headquarters of Dantewada District, and the fourth largest city of Bastar division.

== Geography ==
Dantewada is located at 18.9000°N 81.3500°E. It has an average elevation of 351 meters (1154 feet). The town is situated on the banks of the Shakini and Dakini rivers.

== Notable site ==
- Maa Danteshwari temple

== Administrative divisions ==
Dantewada Tehsil is divided into thirty eight gram panchayats, each of which has jurisdiction over one or more villages.

== Demographics ==
As of the 2011 census, Dantewada had a population of 13,633. 53% of the population was male and 47% female. Dantewada had a literacy rate of 70%, compared to the national average of 59.5%: male literacy was 78% and, female literacy was 61%.

== Notable people ==
- Mahendra Karma: an Indian National Congress politician who was assassinated by Maoists in 2013
