= Araku railway station =

Railway station in Andhra Pradesh

Araku
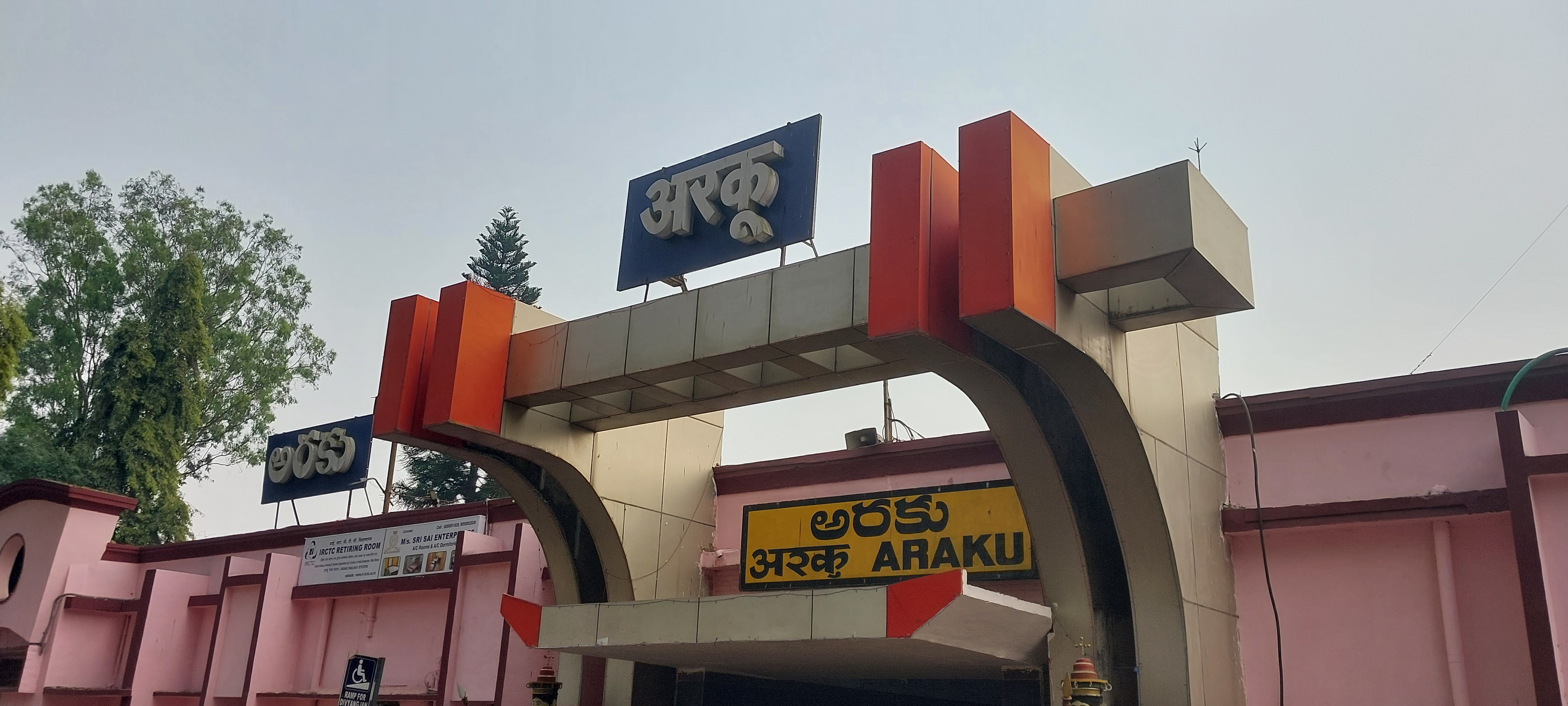
- Entrance of Araku railway station

General information
- Location: Araku, Alluri Sitharama Raju district, Andhra Pradesh; India
- Coordinates: 18°20′N 82°52′E
- Elevation: 925 metres (3,035 ft)
- System: Passenger train station
- Owner: Indian Railways
- Operator: South Coast Railway zone
- Line: Kothavalasa–Kirandul line
- Platforms: 1
- Tracks: 4

Other information
- Status: Functioning
- Station code: ARK
- Zone(s): South Coast Railway zone
- Division(s): Visakhapatnam

Services
Preceding station	Indian Railways	Following station
Shimiliguda towards ?	Kothavalasa–Kirandul line Araku	Gorapur towards ?
Location
- Location within Andhra Pradesh Location within India

Araku railway station (station code:ARK) is an Indian railways station located near Araku Valley of Alluri Sitharama Raju district in the state of Andhra Pradesh. It belongs to South Coast Railway zone under Visakhapatnam railway division. The railway station is situated at about 935 meters elevation.

== History ==
In 1960, Indian Railway took up three projects: the Kothavalasa–Araku–Koraput–Jeypore–Jagdalpur–Dantewara–Kirandaul line, the Jharsuguda–Sambalpur–Bargarh–Balangir–Titlagarh Project and the Biramitrapur–Rourkela–Bimlagarh–Kiriburu project. All the three projects taken together were popularly known as the DBK Project or the Dandakaranya–Bolangir–Kiriburu project (under Dandakaranya Project ). The Kothavalasa–Kirandul line was opened in 1966–67 under South Eastern Railway Zone with financial aid of Japan for transporting Iron ore.

Electrification of the Araku railway station was completed in 1982.

== See also ==
- Borra Caves
- Visakhapatnam–Araku AC Tourist Passenger
- Araku Valley
