= Kirandul–Visakhapatnam Express =

Overview
- Service type: Express
- First service: 3 April 2017 (as Special Train); 15 August 2018 (Conversion into Express Train)
- Current operator: South Coast Railways

Route
- Termini: Kirandul; Visakhapatnam Junction
- Stops: 10
- Distance travelled: 471 km (293 mi)
- Average journey time: 12 hours 23 mins
- Service frequency: Daily
- Train number: 18513 / 18514

On-board services
- Classes: General, Sleeper, AC 2 Tier, AC 3 Tier
- Sleeping arrangements: Yes
- Catering facilities: No pantry car attached

Technical
- Rolling stock: ICF coach
- Track gauge: 1,676 mm (5 ft 6 in)
- Operating speed: 140 km/h (87 mph) maximum, 38 km/h (24 mph), including halts
Route map
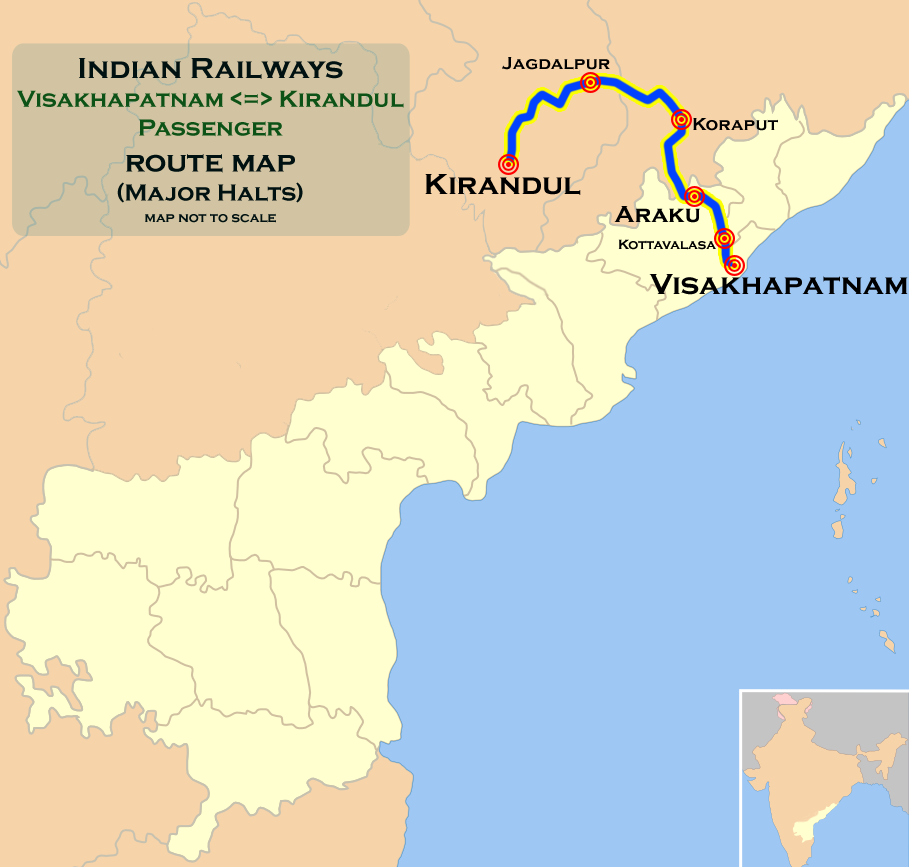

Kirandul–Visakhapatnam Express is an Express train belonging to the South Coast Railway zone of Indian Railways that run between Kirandul and Visakhapatnam Junction in India.

== Coaches ==
The train hauled with LHB rake coaches and also with two Vistadome coaches at the end of the train for the tourists to enjoy the beautiful journey till Araku.

== History ==
The line was inaugurated on 3 April 2017, as a seasonal line: Jagdalpur–Visakhapatnam special train (No. 08511/12). Until late 2017, this service was popular, with Piyush Goyal (Minister of Railways) approving a special train to Kirandul. On 21 November 2017, the train was extended to Kirandul, which is important for the South Chhattisgarh and Coastal Andhra Pradesh.

After 15 August 2018, this Special train was converted into an Express train numbered 18513 / 14. It became the second train running the Kirandul and Visakhapatnam corridor.

== Routes ==
Route for Kirandul - Visakhapatnam express is as below:

Station Name(Code)
Visakhapatnam Junction(VSKP)
Kottavalasa Junction(KTV)
SHRUNGAVARPUKTA(SUP)
Araku(ARK)
Koraput Junction(KRPU)
Jeypore(JYP)
KOTAPAR RD(KPRR)
Jagdalpur(JDB)
Dantewara(DWZ)
Bacheli(BCHL)
Kirandul(KRDL)

== Service ==
The frequency of this train is daily. It covers the distance of 471 km with an average speed of 38 km/h.

== Traction ==
As this route is electrified, Visakhapatnam Electric Loco shed based HOG equipped WAP 7 locomotive pulls the train upto the destination and vice versa
