= Feu =

Feu is the French word for 'fire'.

Feu or FEU may also refer to:

- Feu (album), by French hip hop artist Nekfeu
- Feu (food), a stew or noodle soup from Laos
- Feu (land tenure)
- Far Eastern University, a university in the Philippines
- Federation of Entertainment Unions, a British trade union
- Forty-foot Equivalent Unit
- Limi Feu (born Limi Yamamoto, 1974), Japanese fashion designer
- Fibrinogen equivalent units of D-dimer
- The hypothetical Federal European Union
- Feu (TV series), 2025 Bangladeshi TV series on Chorki.

== See also ==
- Feux, a commune in the Cher department in the Centre region of France
