= Dandakaranya Project =

1958 Indian resettlement programme

The Dandakaranya Project, or the DNK Project, was the form of action the Indian government designed in September 1958 for the settlement of displaced persons from Bangladesh (former East Pakistan) and for integrated development of the area with particular regard to the promotion of the interests of the local tribal population. The particular focus was on Bengali refugees from East Pakistan moving to lands and resources in Odisha and Chhattisgarh. To implement this project, the Government of India established the Dandakaranya Development Authority.

== Background ==
When India achieved liberation from British occupation in 1947, two sections of the Indian subcontinent were "combined" into Pakistan, a country founded on the so-called "Two Nation Theory". The Hindu people residing on the land of East Pakistan (East Bengal now Bangladesh) that was divided into Pakistan moved to India as refugees in three phases. In the first phase people were settled in the state of West Bengal and then in its second-phase people were settled at Assam and Tripura. Eventually there was no room for more people in West Bengal, Assam, or Tripura, so the central government (union government) decided to give them rooms at others states like part of Madhya Pradesh (which is now Chhattisgarh), Odisha and Andhra Pradesh. In the third phase refugees began being sent to places like Andaman Islands.

Most of the places where Bengali refugees were resettled belonged to tribal people. So the union government (which is now central government) designed and put the Dandakaranya Project in place. Through the Dandakaranya Project the Bengali refugees would be resettled on tribal lands, and integrate and uplift the area belonging to the tribal people.

In 1947 a high level committee known as the AMPO committee, made up of the Indian states Andhra Pradesh, Madhya Pradesh (the part is known as Chhattisgarh) and Odisha, was formed to enquire about the soil conservation, forest and health departments. Later they declared that Dandakaranya Project will play a vital role to both the Bengali refugees and tribal people residing there. In 1958 the Dandakarnaya Development Authority was set up with its headquarters at Koraput.

== Existence of Dandakaranya Project ==
The Dandakaranya project was run by Dandakaranya Development Authority (D.D.A) and the project was conceptualized in 1947. It was set up to rehouse homeless refugees from East Pakistan, who were leading a demoralized existence on doles in camps.

The Dandakaranya Project came into existence in terms of the Government of India Resolution (law) dated 12 September 1958 for the avowed purpose of effective and expeditious execution of the schemes to replace displaced persons from East Pakistan in Dandakaranya and for the integrated development of the area with particular regard to the promotion of the interests of the area's tribal population. The sphere of activity has been confined to the districts of Bastar in Chhattisgarh and Koraput in Odisa.

The area coming under this scheme comprises nearly 30,000 square miles and offers possibilities for reclaiming over two lakh acres, at least 45,000 acres of which can be irrigated by two projects . The first hopes of a rapid resettlement of 20,000 East Bengal refugee families . The actual arrivals from the refugee camps, have been only 1,464 families.

== Project at glance ==
There are 13 sections in the project, namely, project headquarters, finance and accounts, zonal administrations, agriculture and animal husbandry, construction, irrigation, transport and workshop, Industrial, forestry, medical and health, education, supply base, liaison.

Following are the project undertaken:

- Bhaskel Dam
- Kherkatta Dam (Paralkot Reservoir)
- Woodworking centres at Jagdalpur, Boregaon, and Umerkote
- Bailadila
- Bhawanipatna
- Malkangiri
- Koraput railway station
- Titlagarh railway station
- Jharsuguda railway station
- Sambalpur railway station
- Kothavalasa–Kirandul line/ Kothavalasa railway station/ Kirandul railway station
- Biramitrapur
- Rourkela
- Bimlagarh
- Kiriburu project
- Araku railway station
- Dandakaranya-Bolangir-Kiriburu project (DBK project)

== Other members of the authority ==
- Anthony Leocadia Fletcher was the Chief administrator from 1950 to 1960.
- Sahadeva Sahoo was the Chief administrator.
- Badal Chatterjee was the interim Chief Administrator for a period of 6months.

== Failure of project ==
Saibal Kumar Gupta (husband of Ashoka Gupta, an Indian social worker and freedom fighter), the chairman of the DDA, blew the whistle on the project in a series of damning articles in 1964. He stated that less than 10 percent of the soil was fit for farming. These difficulties of agriculture colonization in the Dandakaranya Project were a result of rainfall variability, aridity, land reclamation, soil and hydrological problems. Before the partition of Bengal, people suffered a lot financially. Even after the partition, people had to leave their own homeland and adjust on meagre allowances given to them by the government. In both cases, the people of Bengal suffered, and were referred to as refugees in their own country.

== News ==
- Dandakaranya : Struggles Of A Different Kind

== See also ==
- Partition of Bengal (1905)
- Marichjhapi massacre
