= Visakhapatnam–Araku AC Tourist Passenger =

Visakhapatnam - Araku AC Tourist Passenger
Overview
- Service type: Passenger
- Locale: Andhra Pradesh
- First service: 16 April 2017; 9 years ago
- Current operator: East Coast Railway

Route
- Termini: Visakhapatnam Junction (VSKP); Araku (ARK)
- Stops: 12
- Distance travelled: 129 km (80 mi)
- Average journey time: 3h 55m
- Service frequency: Daily (Note: Runs seven days in a week for every direction.)
- Train number: 00501/00502

On-board services
- Class: Unreserved
- Seating arrangements: Yes
- Sleeping arrangements: No
- Catering facilities: No
- Observation facilities: ICF coach
- Entertainment facilities: No
- Baggage facilities: Below the seats

Technical
- Rolling stock: 2
- Track gauge: 5 ft 6 in (1,676 mm)
- Electrification: No
- Operating speed: 33 km/h (21 mph) average with halts

The Visakhapatnam - Araku AC Tourist Passenger is a passenger train belonging to East Coast Railway that runs between Visakhapatnam Junction and Araku. It is currently being operated with 00501/00502 train numbers on a daily basis.

== Features ==
This train is India's first Vista Dome coach train which goes from scenic view of Eastern Ghats. It has got has an observation lounge, large glass windows with capacity of 40-seat has the double-wide reclining passenger seats that could be rotated 360 degrees.

== Service ==
The 00501/Visakhapatnam - Araku AC Tourist Passenger runs with an average speed of 33 km/h and completes 129 km in 3h 55m. The 00502/Araku - Visakhapatnam AC Tourist Passenger runs with an average speed of 28 km/h and completes 129 km in 4h 35m.

== Route and halts ==
The important halts of the train are:

- Visakhapatnam Junction
- Araku

== Coach composite ==
The train has standard LHB rakes with max speed of 130 kmph. The train consists of 19 coaches:

- 2 Vista Dome AC Chair Car

== Traction ==
Both trains are hauled by a Visakhapatnam Loco Shed based WAG-5 electric locomotive from Visakhapatnam to Araku and vice versa.

== Rake Sharing ==
The train attached with 58501/58502 Visakhapatnam–Kirandul Passenger.

== See also ==
- Araku railway station
- Visakhapatnam Junction railway station
- Visakhapatnam–Kirandul Passenger
