= Chennai Central–Visakhapatnam Express =

MAS–VSKP Express
Overview
- Service type: Superfast Train
- Status: Operating
- Locale: Andhra Pradesh, Tamil Nadu
- First service: 15 December 2012; 13 years ago
- Current operator: South Coast Railway zone

Route
- Termini: Chennai Central (MAS); Visakhapatnam (VSKP)
- Stops: 11
- Distance travelled: 781 km (485 mi)
- Average journey time: 13 hours,15 minutes

On-board services
- Classes: Sleeper, Ac2,3 General
- Observation facilities: Large windows in all carriages
- Baggage facilities: Available

Technical
- Rolling stock: 1
- Track gauge: Broad (1,676 mm)
- Operating speed: 110 kilometres per hour (68 mph), average speed 57 kilometres per hour (35 mph)
Route map
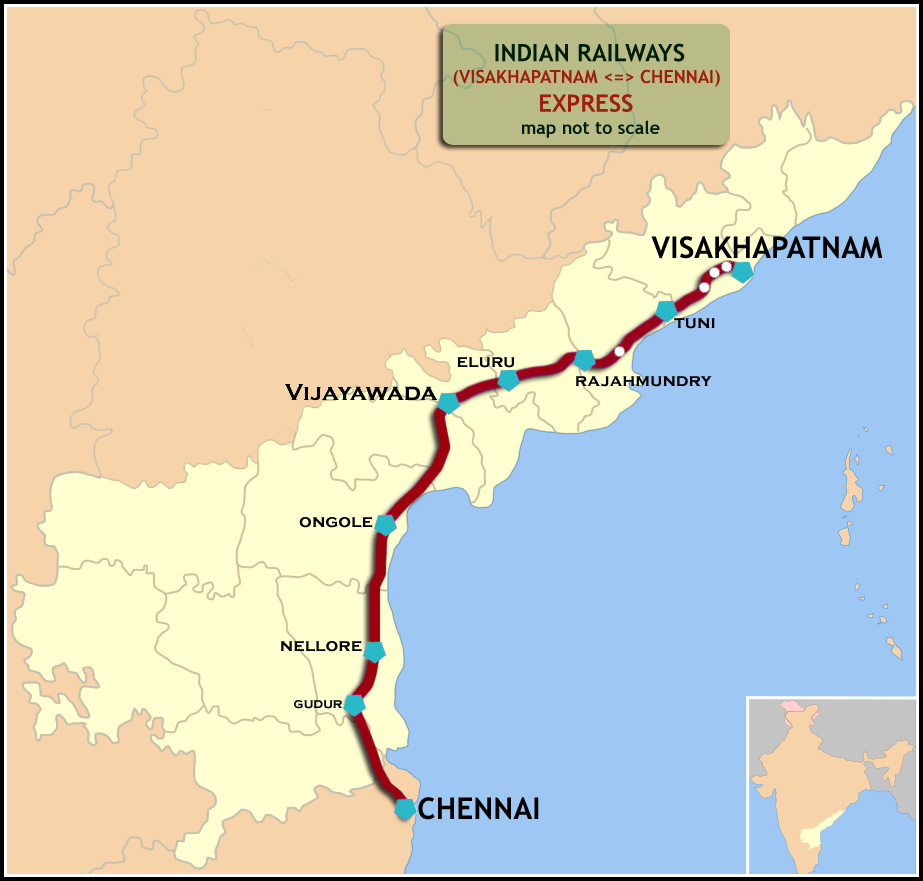

Train number 22870 / 22869 was flagged of on Chennai Central–Visakhapatnam Express 15 December 2012. It is a weekly Superfast Express connecting Chennai and Visakhapatnam which is scheduled to leave Chennai Central 21.10 hours every Tuesday which reaches its destination, Visakhapatnam the next day i.e. Wednesday at morning 10.25 hours. It has the Rake composition of One AC-2 tier, two AC-3 tier, seven sleeper class, four general second class and two guard cum luggage vans. The travel time is 13 hours 15 minutes. It has 11 halts and 137 intermediate stations between Chennai Central and Visakhapatnam Junction. Its average speed is 57 km/h. It runs on the locomotive of AJJ (Arrakonam) WAM4 6PE. Off link is BZA WAG 7. It has RSA sharing with train number 18503/18504. It is maintained by South Coast Railway.

== See also ==
- Andhra Pradesh Express
- Visakhapatnam Swarna Jayanti Express
- Araku railway station
