= Marichjhapi massacre =

1979 eviction of Bangladeshi refugees

Marichjhapi incident
- Date: 24 January 1979 – 18 May 1979
- Location: Marichjhanpi; 22.1070°N 88.9510°E

Parties
Government of West Bengal; Left Front; West Bengal Police	Post-partition refugees from Dandakaranya camps who settled in Marichjhapi

Casualties
- Deaths: 2–8 (official numbers) 10+ (survivors claim)

Marichjhapi massacre or Marichjhapi incident refers to the 1979 eviction of post-partition Bengali refugees who had moved out of the Dandakaranya camps in Odisha, Madhya Pradesh and Chhattisgarh and settled in protected forest lands on Marichjhapi island in the Sundarbans, West Bengal. There was a confrontation between the police and the settled population, that led to an economic blockade and later police action was taken to forcibly evict the settlers which all led to several deaths.

== Background ==
During and after the division of Bengal, many fled communal violence in East Pakistan (now Bangladesh) and came to West Bengal. The first flow was of refugees who were mostly upper and middle class Hindus who were able to resettle in West Bengal. But over time a greater a flow of poorer Bengalis began. This later surge reached its peak in 1970's around the time of the Bangladesh War of Independence. During this time, Ram Niwas Mirdha had said in the Lok Sabha that Bengal had become saturated and relocating migrants was inevitable. There was resistance from refugees, hailing from wetland marshy coastal landscape, against the relocation to wastelands. However, after initial resistance from them they were forcibly sent to "rocky inhospitable semi arid land" of Dandakaranya, mostly in Orissa, Madhya Pradesh and Chhattisgarh, and Terai region of Uttar Pradesh (now Uttarakhand), and Little Andaman. Most of them remained in miserable conditions in refugee camps under the Dandakaranya Project.

Left Front leaders like Ram Chatterjee opposed the relocation policy of Union Govt. They reached out to migrants by visiting camps in Dandakaranya and promised them that if the Left Front comes to power in West Bengal then all migrants would be brought back and settled in Bengal itself.

== Incident ==
Once the Left Front came to power in 1977, the refugees from Dandakaranya camps started to return to independent Bangladesh in large numbers. The refugees were approximately 136,000 in numbers and the Left Front government identified 247,000 acres of readily reclaimable lands mostly in the Sundarban area (Ganges Delta) for the resettlement of these agriculturist refugees, originally from East Pakistan (now Bangladesh). Initially the government approved and actively encouraged voluntary resettlement of the identified lands by the refugees. Significant number of the refugees ended up also settling in unauthorised lands and were usually allowed to, around 40,000 refugees went to Hasnabad, Hingalganj and Geonkhali, and about 15,000 settling in the small island of Marichjhapi (renamed by them as "Netaji Nagar"), a protected place under Reserve Forest Act. But in some time the Left Front had shifted its policy on refugee settling, taking a stance that the refugees were not just the citizens of West Bengal but of India and the rest of the country needed to take responsibility as well.

In Marichjhapi, they attained self-sufficiency in fishing for food and had built schools and clinics on their own but had to travel to nearby Islands for obtaining grain and clean drinking water. One of the settlers later claims that there were only shrubs on the island when they came. The government considered the refugee settlements an unauthorized occupation of a reserved forest land and a report was published that a subsequent chain of migrations could result in a severe ecological disaster. They began pressuring the refugees to vacate.

On 24 January 1979, the Government of West Bengal clamped prohibitory orders under Section 144 of the CrPC around the island of Marichjhapi. Thirty police ferries were brought in for the eviction and they started patrolling the island, pressurising the settlers. Eyewitness accounts say that on 31 January, the police opened fire on the Hindu refugees who settled on the island, when the refugees allegedly attacked a police camp with traditional weapons. The police and the district administration started a complete blockade. It prevented access to food and clean drinking water for the residents of the island. Many of them ended up consuming contaminated water resulting in at least a few dozen deaths. Ananda Marga, a religious organisation, is also suspected to have had a hand in sparking the violence, the organization was active in the region, allegedly involved in smuggling and would frequently get into conflict with the native tribal community. After 15 days, the Calcutta High Court ruled that "The supply of drinking water, essential food items and medicines as well as the passage of doctors must be allowed to Marichjhapi".

Some of the refugees were forcibly relocated to Dandakaranya while the rest were escorted in police launches to Hasnabad. Some of them were settled in Marichjhapi Colony near Barasat while others rehabilitated themselves in the shanties near railway tracks in Sealdah. Some of them resettled themselves in Hingalganj, Canning and nearby areas.

The official toll was at first two. The incident led to severe criticism of the government from the media, the opposition and from within members of the Left Front coalition. The demand for a formal investigation into the eviction was nevertheless denied by the government, with Basu convinced that it was greatly exaggerated by the media. Later, the official figure put the deaths at 2 to 8, considered to be a significant under-estimation. The numbers from independent investigations are considered unreliable, since there is no formal proof either way.

== In popular culture ==
Chorki made a web series named Feu inspired by this incident.

== See also ==
- Dandakaranya Project
- The Hungry Tide, a novel by Amitav Ghosh
- Feu (2025 Bangladeshi TV series on Chorki)
