= Kottavalasa Junction railway station =

Railway station in Andhra Pradesh, India

Kottavalasa Junction
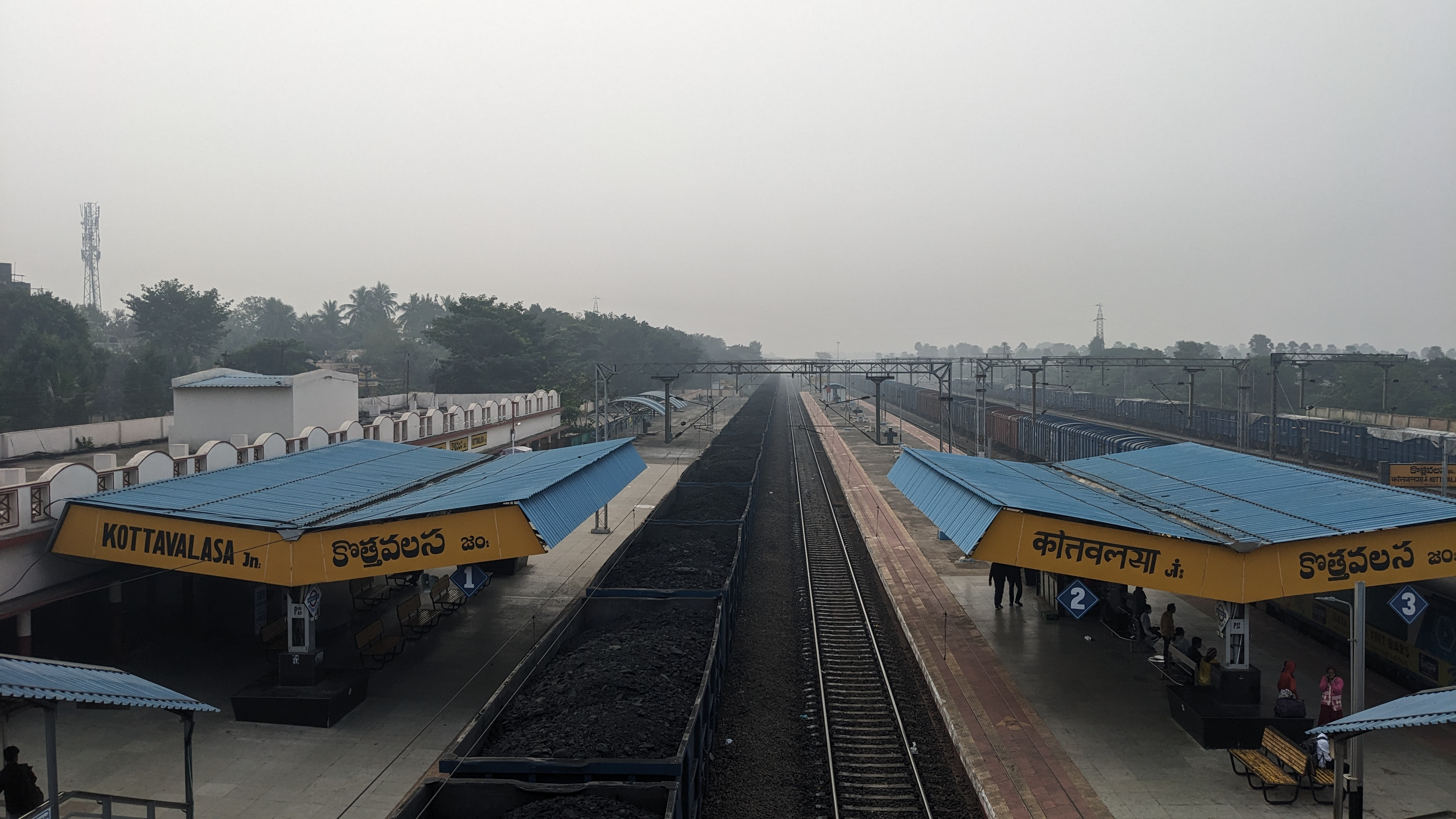
- Aerial view of Kottavalasa Jn.

General information
- Location: Visakhapatnam–Aarku Road, Kothavalasa, Vizianagaram dt., Andhra Pradesh; India
- Coordinates: 17°53′30″N 83°11′09″E
- Elevation: 56 m (184 ft)
- System: Junction station
- Operator: South Coast Railway
- Lines: Khurda Road–Visakhapatnam section of Howrah–Chennai main line Kothavalasa–Kirandul line
- Platforms: 5
- Tracks: 5 ft 6 in (1,676 mm) broad gauge

Construction
- Structure type: Standard (on-ground station)
- Parking: Available
- Accessible: Yes

Other information
- Status: Functioning
- Station code: KTV
- Zone(s): South Coast Railway zone
- Division(s): Visakhapatnam

History
- Opened: 1896; 130 years ago
- Former names: East Coast State Railway; Bengal Nagpur Railway
Location
- Location within Visakhapatnam Location within Andhra Pradesh Location within India

Kothavalasa Junction railway station (station code: KTV) located in the Indian state of Andhra Pradesh, serves Kothavalasa in Vizianagaram district. It is a major freight transit point with iron ore rakes travelling from mines around Kirandul and Bailadila in Chhattisgarh to Visakhapatnam Port.

== History ==
Between 1893 and 1896, 1,288 km (800 mi) of the East Coast State Railway was opened for traffic. In 1898–99, Bengal Nagpur Railway was linked to the lines in southern India.

In 1960, Indian Railways took up three projects: the Kothavalasa–Araku–Koraput–Jeypore–Jagdalpur–Dantewara–Kirandaul line, the Jharsuguda–Sambalpur–Bargarh–Balangir–Titlagarh Project and the Biramitrapur–Rourkela–Bimlagarh–Kiriburu Project. All the three projects taken together were popularly known as the DBK Project or the Dandakaranya Bolangir Kiriburu Project (under Dandakaranya Project). The Kothavalasa–Kirandaul line was opened in 1966–67.

== Electrified ==
The Visakhapatnam–Kothavalasa–Araku–Koraput–Jeypore Jagdalpur–Dantewara–Kirandul section was electrified in the year 1980–83.

== Railway reorganization ==
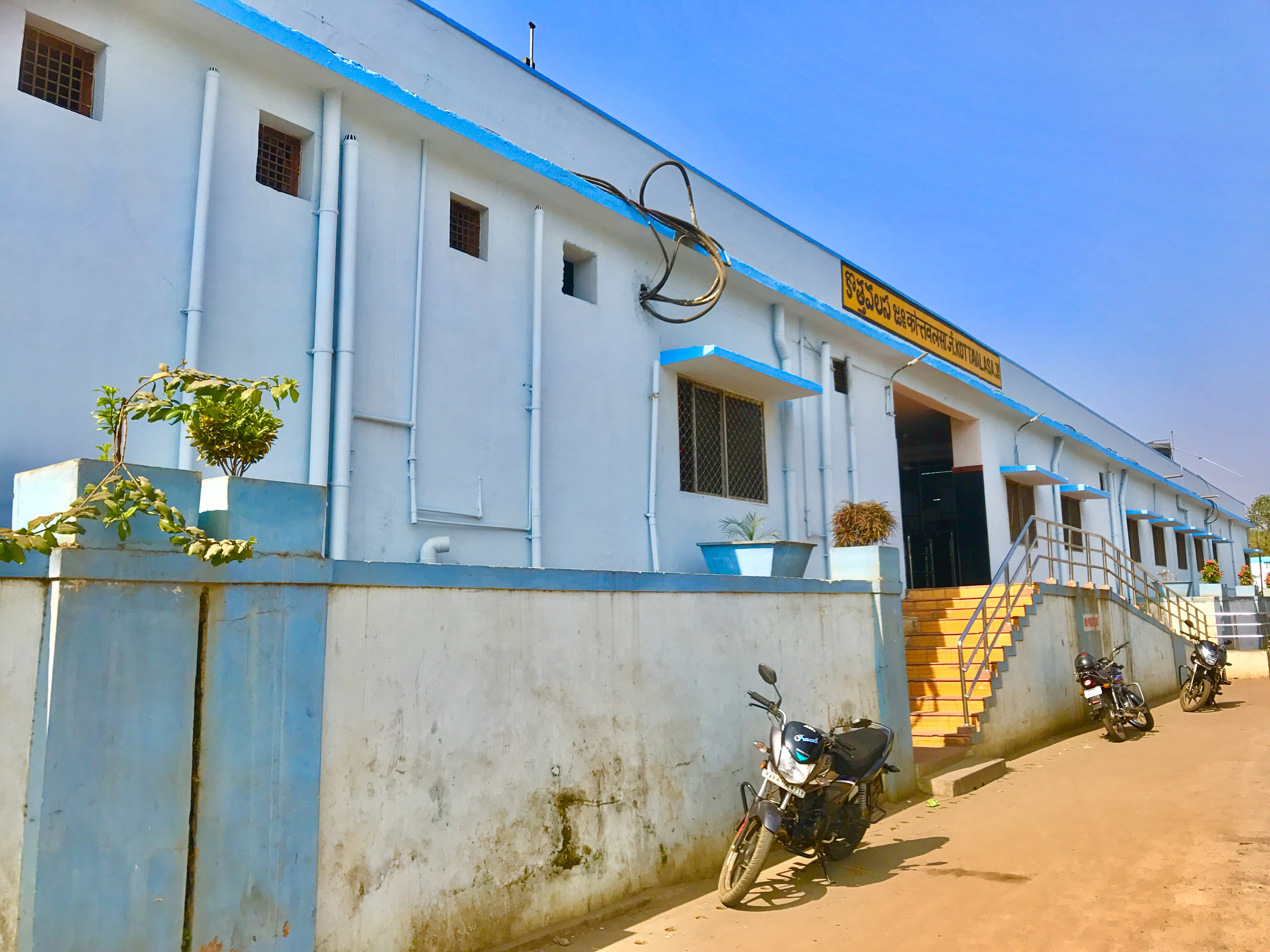
Kothavalasa railway station entrance

The Bengal Nagpur Railway was nationalized in 1944.Eastern Railway was formed on 14 April 1952 with the portion of East Indian Railway Company east of Mughalsarai and the Bengal Nagpur Railway. In 1955, South Eastern Railway was carved out of Eastern Railway. It comprised lines mostly operated by BNR earlier. Amongst the new zones started in April 2003 were East Coast Railway and South East Central Railway. Both these railways were carved out of South Eastern Railway. Railway. South Coast Railway was carved out of East Coast Railway and South Central Railway on 27 feb 2019.

Preceding station	Indian Railways	Following station
Kantakapalle towards ?	South Coast Railway zone Khurda Road–Visakhapatnam section of Howrah–Chennai main line	Pendurti towards ?
Mallividu towards ?	South Coast Railway zone Kothavalasa–Kirandul line	Terminus
