= Feu (TV series) =

Bangladeshi historical television series

- Poster
- Genre: Historical Thriller
- Directed by: Sukorno Sahed Dhiman
- Country of origin: Bangladesh
- Original language: Bengali
- No. of seasons: 1
- No. of episodes: 7

Production
- Production location: Sundarbans

Original release
- Network: Chorki
- Release: 30 January 2025

Feu (Bengali: ফেউ) is a 2025 Bangladeshi historical thriller web series directed by Sukorno Sahed Dhiman. It is inspired by the real‑life events of the 1979 Marichjhapi massacre in the Marichjhanpi mangrove island in West Bengal, India in the Sundarbans. (Note: multiple sources:)

== Plot ==
Set against the backdrop of the island "Dumurjhapi" (a fictional stand‑in for Marichjhapi), the series follows the plight of refugees evicted from their home. It unfolds in two parallel timelines: one in 1979 in Dumurjhapi and the other in 2002 in Mongla, an area adjacent to the Sundarbans in present-day Bagerhat.

== Cast ==
- Chanchal Chowdhury as Sunil
- Mostafizur Noor Imran as Marshall (an honey‑collector turned gang leader)
- Tariq Anam Khan as Kazi
- Tanvir Apurbo as Daniel (Sunil's son)
- Hossain Zibon as Sohel (Daniel's friend)

== Production ==
=== Title ===
The title Feu comes from a colloquial term in the region meaning 'something that follows behind,' referring, for example, to a government informant.

=== Development ===
Director Dhiman conducted five years of research and developed 17 drafts of the script before locking the story in December 2022.

=== Filming ===
Filming took place on-location in the Sundarbans in remote areas rarely used for production, making it logistically challenging.

The series was approved for release due to the shifts in Bangladesh's political climate following the July Revolution. Director Dhiman explained that although production began in 2022, he had initially been unable to complete the series because its historical narrative portrayed India in a critical light, which was politically sensitive in Bangladesh at the time. With reduced barriers, the series was able to depict both the effects of Indian policies and the communal-level violence experienced by refugees.

== Release ==
The trailer premiered on 26 January 2025. The series debuted on Chorki on 30 January 2025.

== Reception ==
Reviewing for Dhaka Tribune, Marouf Kholifa lauded the series, particularly praising Sukorno Shahed Dhiman's direction alongside the screenplay by Romel Rahman and Siddiq Ahamed. Kholifa highlighted the performances of Tanvir Apurbo and Hossain Zibon, commending their on-screen chemistry, emotional depth, and authentic dialect delivery.

Reviewing for The Business Standard, Tanisha Kabir noted that, while Feu opened with an intriguing first episode, its subsequent pacing faltered by being both rushed and sluggish. However, Kabir commended the series for breaking new ground as a historical thriller, a genre seldom explored on local OTT platforms.
