= Kothavalasa–Kirandul line =

Railway route in India

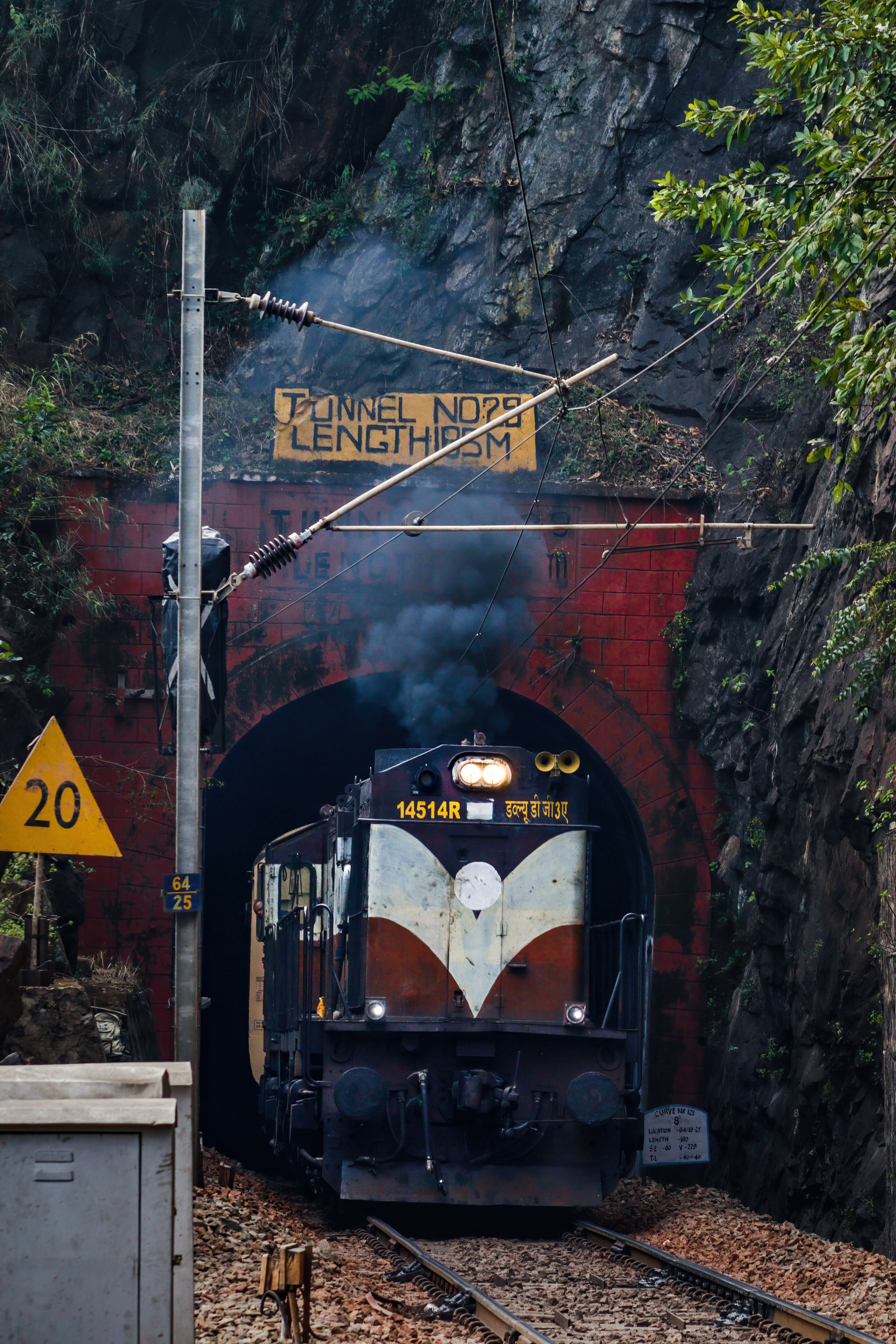
- Train passing through a tunnel on Kothavalasa–Kirandul line

Overview
- Status: Operational
- Owner: Indian Railways
- Locale: Andhra Pradesh, Odisha, Chhattisgarh
- Termini: Kothavalasa; Kirandul
- Stations: 48

Service
- Operator(s): South Eastern Railway zone Till March 2003, East Coast Railway zone from April 2003 to May 2026, South Coast Railway zone and East Coast Railway zone from June 2026

History
- Opened: 1966

Technical
- Track length: 445 km (277 mi)
- Number of tracks: 1
- Track gauge: 5 ft 6 in (1,676 mm) broad gauge
- Electrification: 25 kV AC 50 Hz

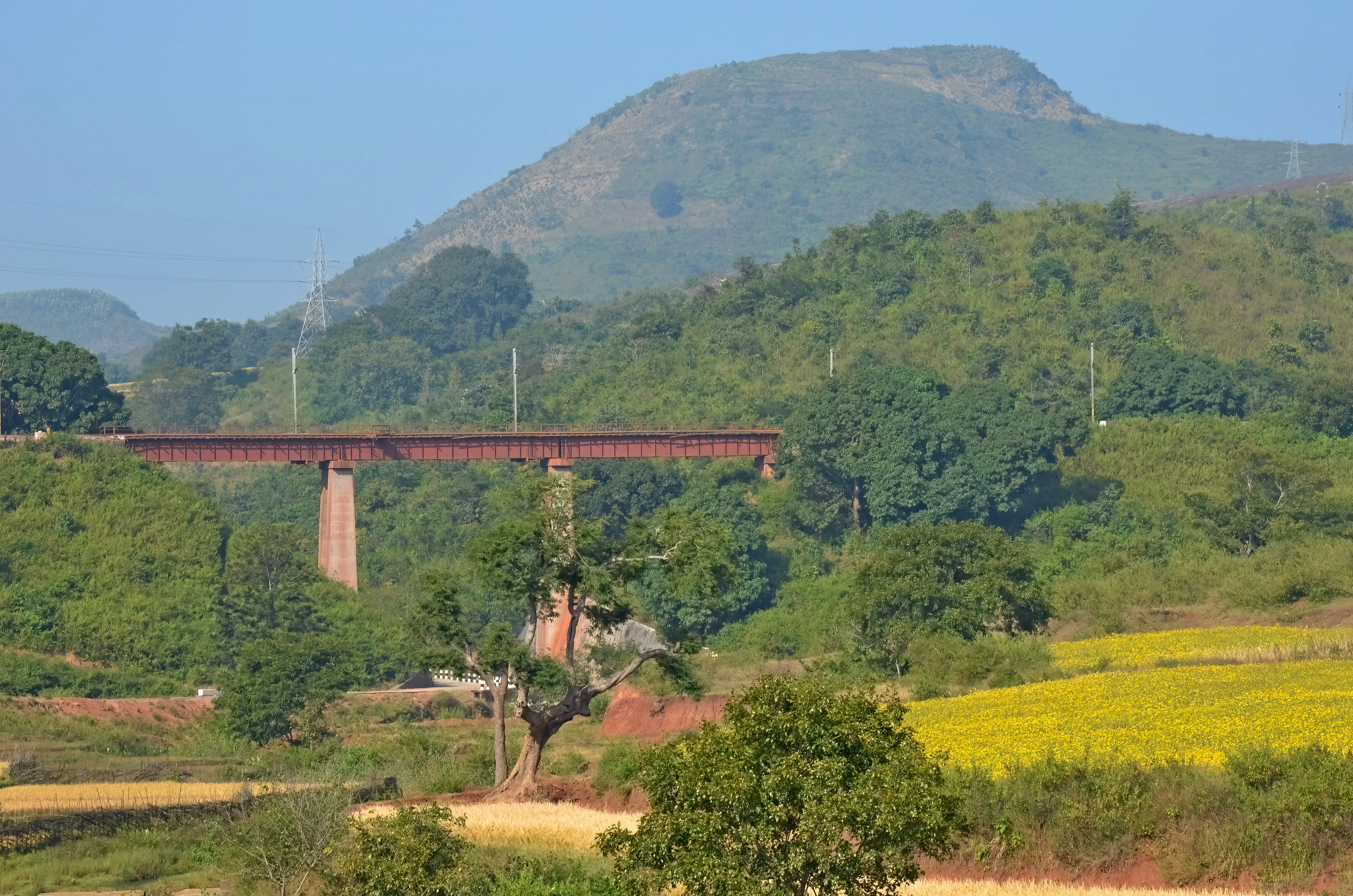
Railway bridge at Karakavalasa, Araku valley

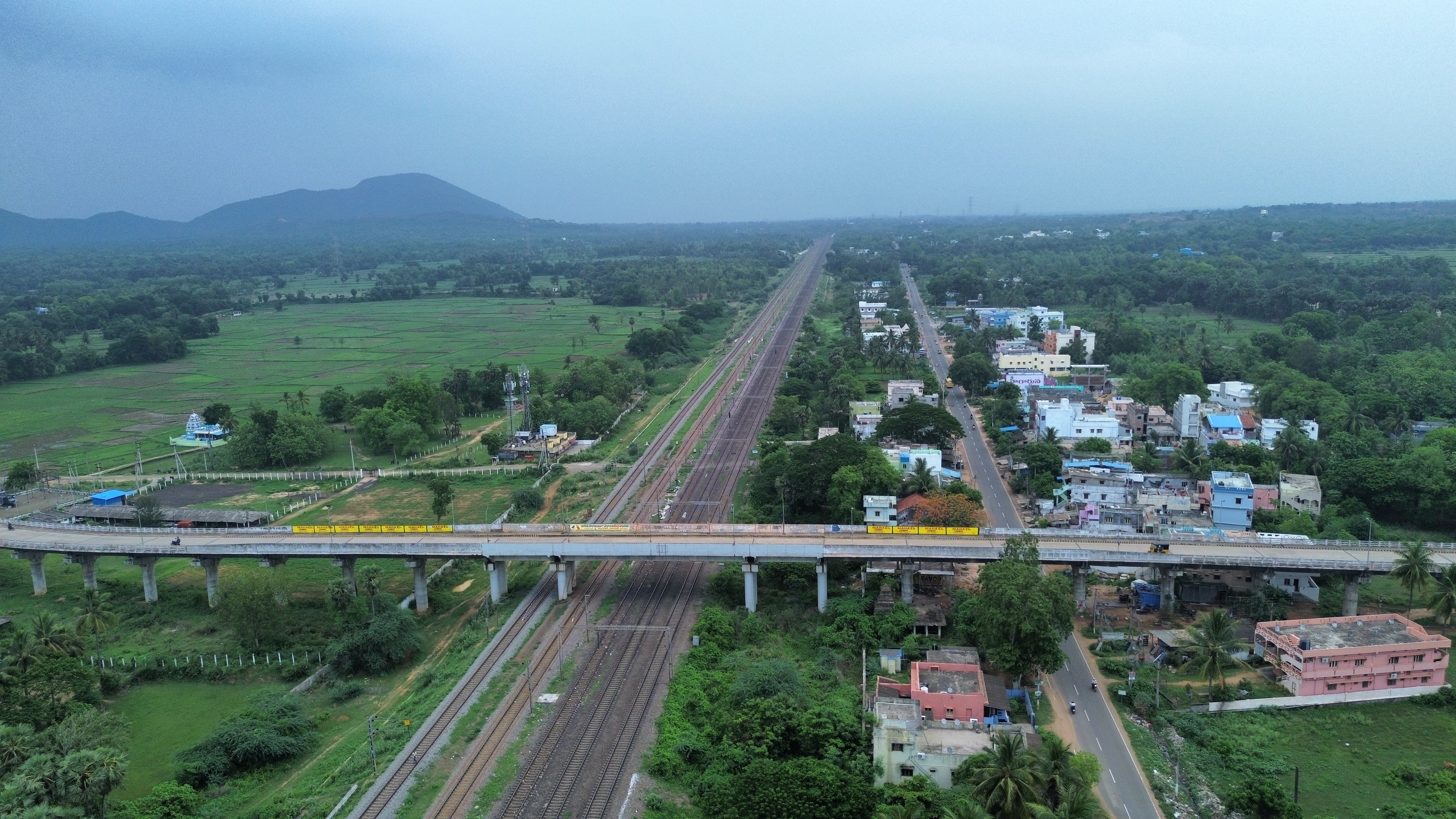
Aerial view of Kothavalsa Kirandul Line and Vizag Araku highway

Kothavalasa–Kirandul line in India belongs to Visakhapatnam railway division of South Coast Railway zone and Rayagada railway division of East Coast Railway zone. It was under South Eastern Railway zone until 2003. It passes through three Indian states; Andhra Pradesh, Odisha and Chhattisgarh.

== History ==
In 1960, Indian Railway took up three projects: the Kothavalasa–Araku–Koraput–Jeypore–Jagdalpur–Dantewara–Kirandaul line, the Jharsuguda–Sambalpur–Bargarh–Balangir–Titlagarh project and the Biramitrapur–Rourkela–Bimlagarh–Kiriburu project. All the three projects taken together were popularly known as the DBK Project or the Dandakaranya–Bolangir–Kiriburu project. The Kothavalasa–Kirandaul line was opened in 1966–67 under S E Railway with financial aid of Japan for transporting iron ore and costed 55.32 crore.

== Geography ==
This line passes hill sections of Eastern Ghats through Araku Valley. The line has a total of 58 tunnels and 84 major bridges and each tunnel is as long as 520 metres.

== Electrification ==
Electrification of the line was completed in four phases. Kirandul–Jagdalpur section was completed in 1980. Jagdalpur–Koraput section was completed in 1981. Koraput–Araku–Waltair section was completed in 1982. The Kothavalasa–Kirandul route was completely electrified by 1982.

== Jurisdiction ==
The line has a length of 445 km (277 mi). Only a small section of 9 km (5.6 mi) from Kothavalasa up to Mallividu is part of the South Coast Railway. The remaining 436 km (271 mi), comprising the vast majority of the corridor, is managed by the Rayagada division of the East Coast Railway. This remainder includes main stations like Araku, Koraput junction, Jeypore, Jagdalpur 444 km (276 mi) in Chhattisgarh up to Kirandul. Although a portion of the Rayagada-managed section physically lies within Andhra Pradesh, it remains under the jurisdiction of the East Coast Railway. The maximum route length is in Chhattisgarh, followed by Andhra Pradesh and Odisha."CITU calls South Coast Railway zone a "betrayal" of Andhra Pradesh". The Hindu. 10 May 2026. The Kothavalasa–Kirandul section is classified as a Group E-special class line where speeds are restricted to below 100 km/h.

== Performance ==
This line is mainly used for freight purposes which is a huge profit benefitting Waltair Division. It generated ₹2,252 crore (US$230 million) in freight earnings in 2022-23 which is a little over 25% of the total freight earnings of Waltair railway division in that financial year. Iron ore from Bailadila is transported to Visakhapatnam through this line.
