= Marichjhanpi =

Island in the mangrove forests of the Sundarbans in West Bengal, India

- Location within West Bengal

Geography
- Location: Bay of Bengal
- Archipelago: Sundarbans

Administration
- India
- State: West Bengal
- District: South 24 Parganas

Demographics
- Population: none

Marichjhanpi is an island set in the mangrove forests of the Sundarbans in West Bengal, India. It is primarily known today for the Marichjhapi massacre in 1979 when the newly elected Communist Party of India (Marxist) government of West Bengal evicted several post-partition Dalit refugees who were living in the reserved forest. The clash between armed residents and the police resulted in about 10,000 deaths. Although the exact death count is unknown, researchers believe that several collateral deaths took place from violent clashes, alleged police brutality, and disease.

== Geography ==
Marichjhanpi is located at 22°06′25″N 88°57′04″E. It has an average elevation of 6 metres (20 ft).

== Background ==
The Partition of India in 1947 split the large eastern province of Bengal into two halves, along religious lines. One half became West Bengal, a Hindu-majority province in the new independent state of India. The other half became East Pakistan, the Muslim-majority eastern half of Pakistan, and later the independent country of Bangladesh.

=== Refugee ===
Partition was accompanied by much bloodshed and suffering, and the mass migration of millions of people - Hindus from their ancestral lands in East Pakistan across to India, Muslims from India trekking in the opposite direction. This cross-transfer of peoples continued through the decades after Partition, although at a much slower rate. While the educated upper classes were able to settle themselves in the urban environs of Calcutta, the poor Hindus were moved to areas outside West Bengal, in the inhospitable terrains of Orissa and Chhattisgarh. Dry forest regions usually inhabited by the adivasis, a region broadly called Dandakaranya. There they lived in concentration camp like conditions. Similar looking huts or tarpaulin tents were put up to be crammed with refugees. The boundaries were surrounded by barbed wires and guarded. The places were named Permanent Liability Camps.

=== Invitation to Bengal ===
The main party of opposition in Bengal the CPI(M) continually provided voice to these refugees from Bangladesh from the outset. They argued that rehabilitation of all Bengali speaking refugees was possible within West Bengal and called upon all refugees to go there. They even assured that once in power they will all be rehabilitated in Bengal. The other view towards this generous gesture is that the CPI(M) was looking to develop a mass base among the considerable number of Refugees already in Bengal, plus encourage more to come into Bengal. In a demonstration in a refugee camp in Dandakaranya, the leader of CPI(M) himself invited all of them to Bengal, and the response he got was overwhelming.

=== The exodus ===
The refugees took the invitation to be genuine and as soon as the Left Front government first came to power in Calcutta in 1977, the refugees decided to move back to West Bengal. The refugees had a committee named Udbastu Unnyansil Samity who sent representatives to Bengal. And they decided upon settling in Marichjhanpi an island in Sunderbans. The CPI(M) was apprehensive on the selection of the place due to its association with the Sunderban Tiger Project. However they decided not to be too antagonistic from the beginning and mentioned that the refugees may come but they have to settle themselves.

This did not deter the refugees and many families went to the Sundarbans, especially those who were originally from the nearby district of Khulna in Bangladesh, and who already had relatives living from before in clearings in the forest.

=== Antagonism to the exodus ===
The massive inflow of refugees resulted in administrative troubles. Many were arrested in their way and deported back to Dandyak. But that could not discourage all of the refugees who had sold off their meager belongings and decided to move out of Dandyak at any cost. Finally almost 40,000 of them reached Hasnabad and about 500 of them settled at Marichjhanpi.

== See also ==
- Marichjhapi incident
