= Shimiliguda =

- village
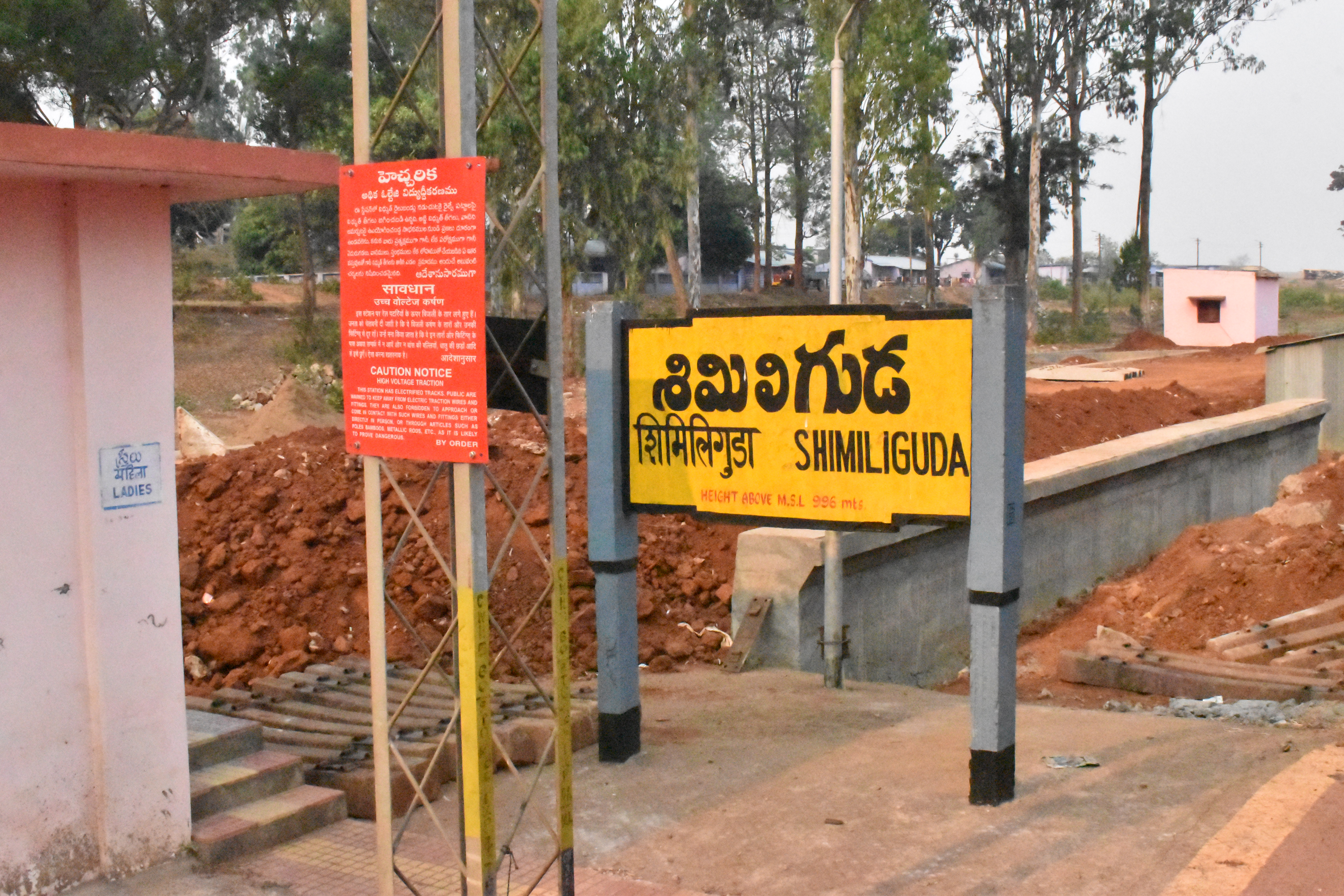
- Shimiliguda railway station
- Interactive map of Shimiliguda
- Location in Odisha, India
- Country: India
- State: Andhra Pradesh
- Elevation: 996 m (3,268 ft)

Languages
  - Official: Telugu
- Time zone: UTC+5:30 (IST)

Shimiliguda is a village in Alluri Sitharama Raju district of the Indian state of Andhra Pradesh.

== Transport ==
The Shimiliguda railway station in the village is on Kothavalasa-Kirandul line of Waltair railway division in East Coast Railway zone. It is located at an altitude of 997 m (3,271 ft) above sea level and was the first highest broad gauge railway station in the country.
