= Visakhapatnam–Kirandul Express =

Passenger train in India

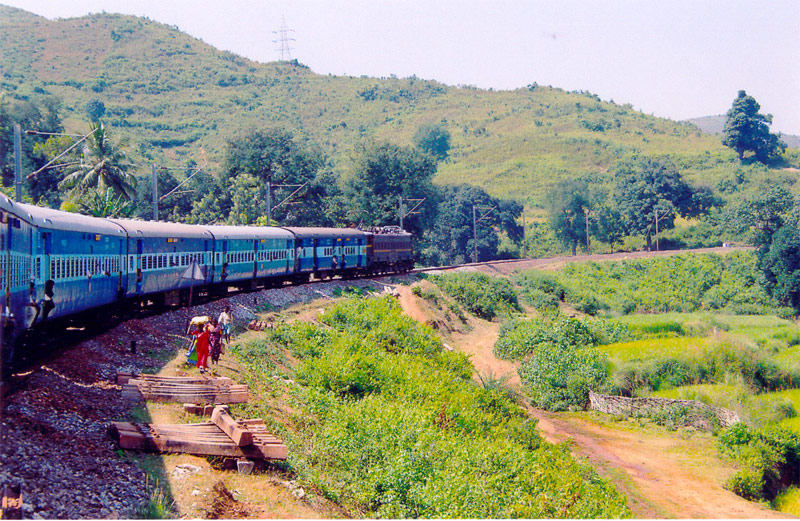
- Kirandul Express in Araku valley

Overview
- Service type: Passenger
- Locale: Andhra Pradesh, Odisha, Chhattisgarh
- First service: 30 April 1968; 58 years ago
- Current operator: South Coast Railway zone

Route
- Termini: Visakhapatnam (VSKP); Kirandul (KRDL)
- Stops: 13
- Distance travelled: 469 km (291 mi)
- Average journey time: 13 hours 55 minutes (up) and 14 hours 30 minutes (down)
- Service frequency: Daily
- Train number: 18551 / 18552

On-board services
- Seating arrangements: Yes
- Sleeping arrangements: Yes
- Observation facilities: Standard Indian Railways coaches

Technical
- Rolling stock: 2
- Track gauge: 1,676 mm (5 ft 6 in)
- Operating speed: 33 km/h (21 mph) (up), 32 km/h (20 mph) (down) including halts
Route map
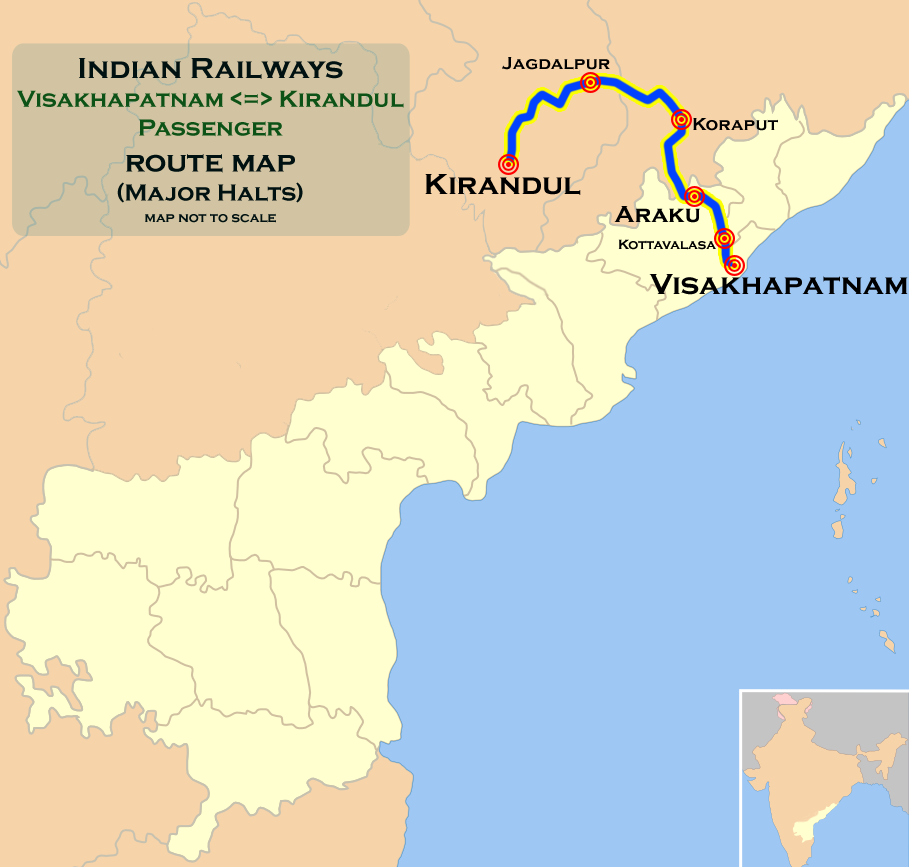

The Visakhapatnam–Kirandul Express is an express train belonging to Indian Railways that runs between Visakhapatnam and Kirandul as a daily service. It is maintained by the South Coast Railway zone.

== Coaches ==
This train consists of one Sleeper Class, one AC 2 Tier Class, one chair car, six General Unreserved and two guard cum luggage vans. Total composition is 11 coaches.

== Service ==
The Visakhapatnam–Kirandul Express covers the distance of 469 kilometres (291 mi) in 13 hours 55 minutes on its journey towards Kirandul and in 14 hours 30 minutes on its journey towards Visakhapatnam. 18551/18552 Visakhapatnam–Kirandul Express averaging 33 kilometres per hour (21 mph) on journey towards Kirandul and averaging 32 kilometres per hour (20 mph) on journey towards Visakhapatnam.

== Traction ==
It is hauled by WAG-7 electric loco from Visakhapatnam to Kirandul.
