= Borra Caves =

Borra Caves Borrā Guhalu
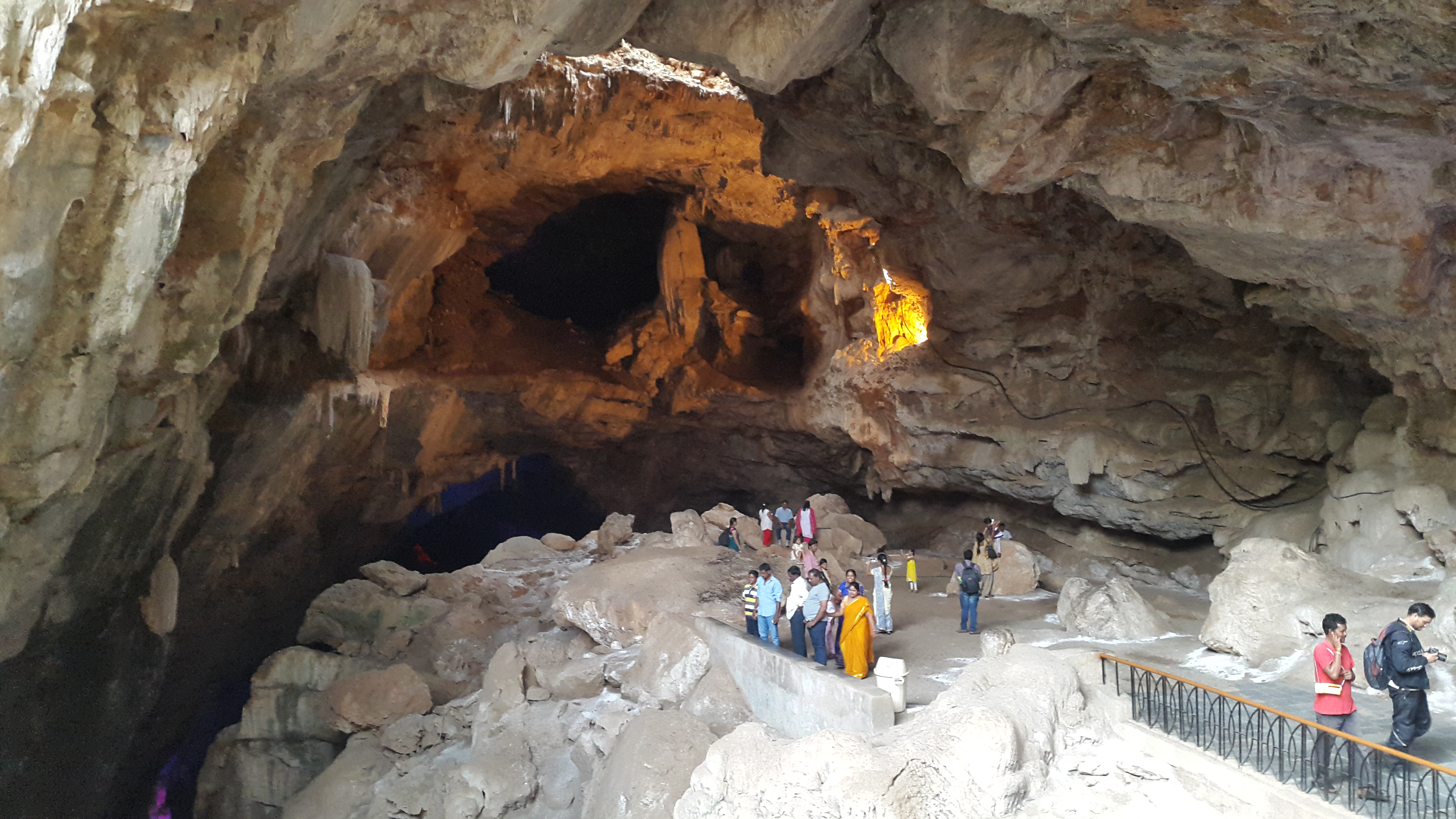

- Location in Andhra Pradesh, India
- Coordinates: 18°10′N 83°0′E
- Country: India
- State: Andhra Pradesh
- District: Alluri Sitharama Raju
- Elevation: 705 m (2,313 ft)
- Time zone: UTC+5:30 (IST)

Borra Caves (Telugu: Borrā Guhalu) are a limestone cave system in Ananthagiri hills of the Araku Valley in Alluri Sitharama Raju district, Andhra Pradesh. They feature extensive karst formations, including stalactites, stalagmites, and other speleothems.

"Borra" means "hole" in Telugu language.

== History ==
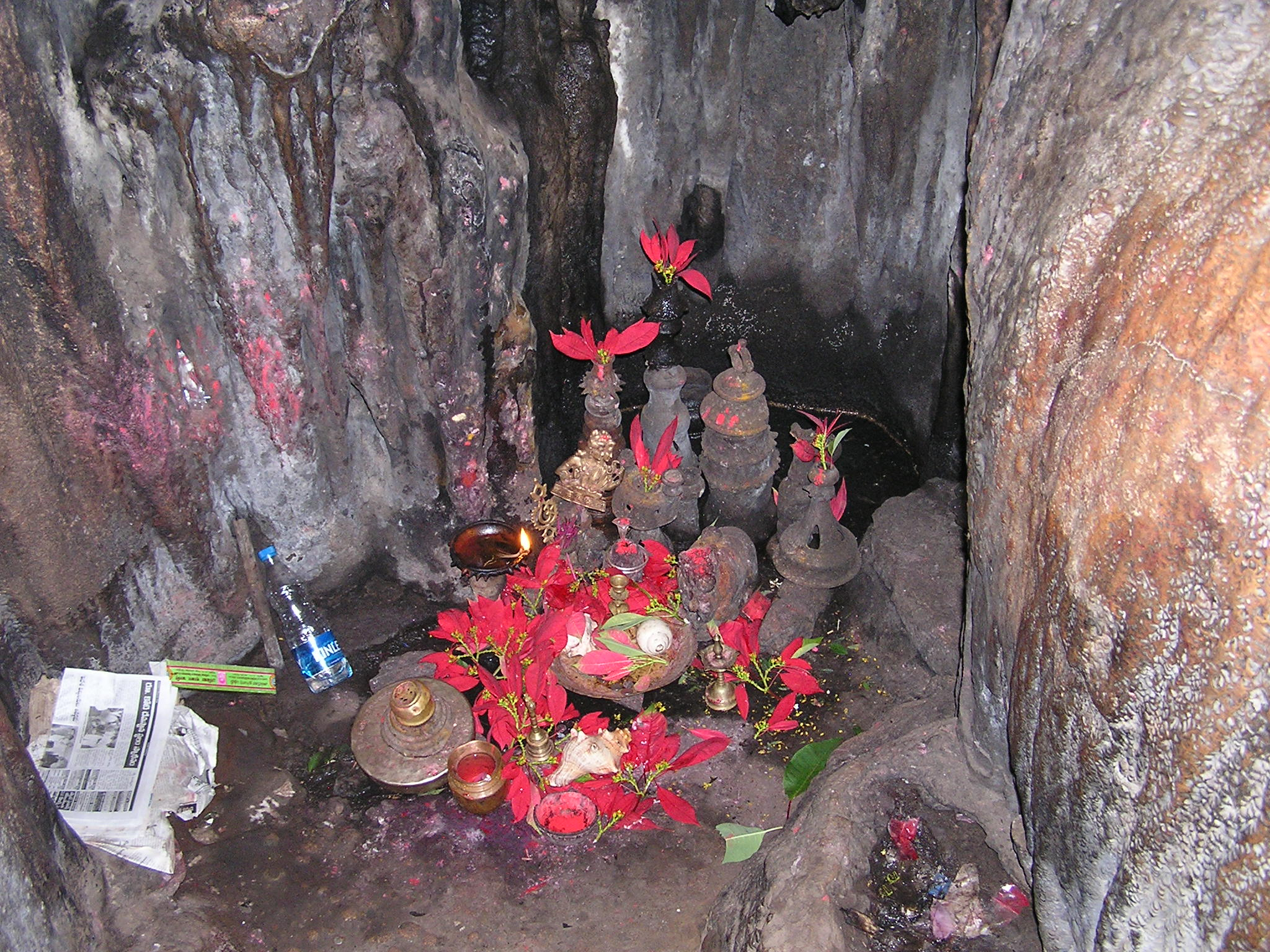
Worship of lingam inside the Borra Caves

There are several local legends that involve the caves. As per one such story, a cow dropped 60 ft (18 m) into the caves while grazing on top of them. The cowherd while searching for the cow, found that the cow had survived. He went into the cave to rescue the cow and found a stalagmite formation, that resembled a lingam, a representation of Hindu god Shiva. The survival of the cow was regarded as a miracle and the people started worshiping the lingam.

Archeological artifacts from the Paleolithic era have been found in the caves. The caves were explored by British geologist William King George in the year 1807. In the 2000s, the Andhra Pradesh State Tourism Department developed the caves for tourist purposes and installed several mercury, sodium vapor and halogen electric lamps, which illuminate the limestone formations inside the cave.

== Geography and climate ==
The caves are situated in the Araku Valley of the Ananthagiri hill range. At its entrance, the cave measures up to 100 m (330 ft) horizontally and 75 m (246 ft) vertically. The caves are located at an elevation of about 705 m (2,313 ft), the caves extend to a depth of 80 m (260 ft) beneath the ground.

The average annual temperature of Araku hills, where the caves are situated, is about 25 °C (77 °F). The region receives an annual rainfall of about 950 mm (37 in).

== Geology and formation ==
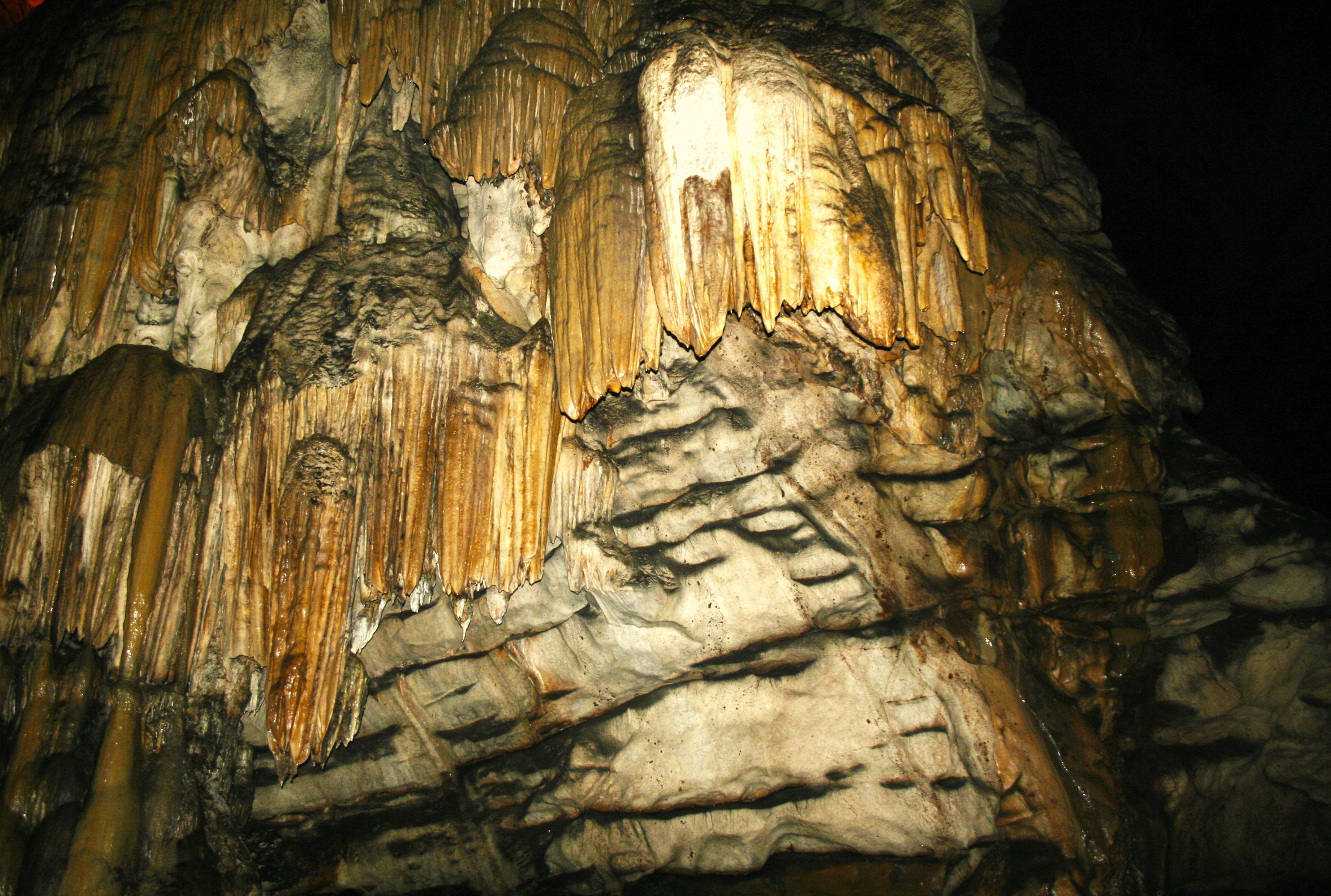
Karst formation inside the caves

The regional geology in the Eastern Ghats mobile belt, where the caves are located, is represented by the khondalite suite of rocks (garnetiferous sillimanite gneisses, quartzo-feldsphatic garnet gneisses) of Archaen age, and Quaternary deposits made up of red bed sediments, laterites, pediment fans, colluvium, alluvium and coastal sands.

The caves host a variety of speleothems of various sizes and irregularly shaped stalactites and stalagmites. The region consists of white carbonate rocks, and coarsely crystalline, deformed, and banded marbles cover a triangular area of 2 km^{2} (0.77 sq mi). It is surrounded by diopside–scapolite–feldspar calc-granulites. The outcrops made of pyroxenite are dark and include discontinuous calc-silicate bands, some consisting of brown mica and others with calcite. While the caves are basically limestone formations, the area surrounding these consisting of mica formations have been prospected for precious stones like rubies.

The caves are deep and aphotic. The stalactites seen in the caves range from 0.1 to 3.5 m (3.9 in to 11 ft 5.8 in) in length while the stalagmites are 1.2 m (3 ft 11 in). The limestone column is 6 m (20 ft) high and 0.75 m (2 ft 6 in) wide. The height of the cave is 12 m (39 ft) and it stretches to about 200 m (660 ft). The average temperature of the inner cave wall is about 16 °C (61 °F). Sulfur springs discharge into the cave passages causing corrosion of limestone.

The Gosthani River, which originates in the region, formed the odd shaped karst formations. Water percolating from the roof of the caves dissolved the limestone rocks and trickled to form the stalactites along the roof of the cave and then dripped to the ground, later forming the stalagmites.

== Biodiversity ==
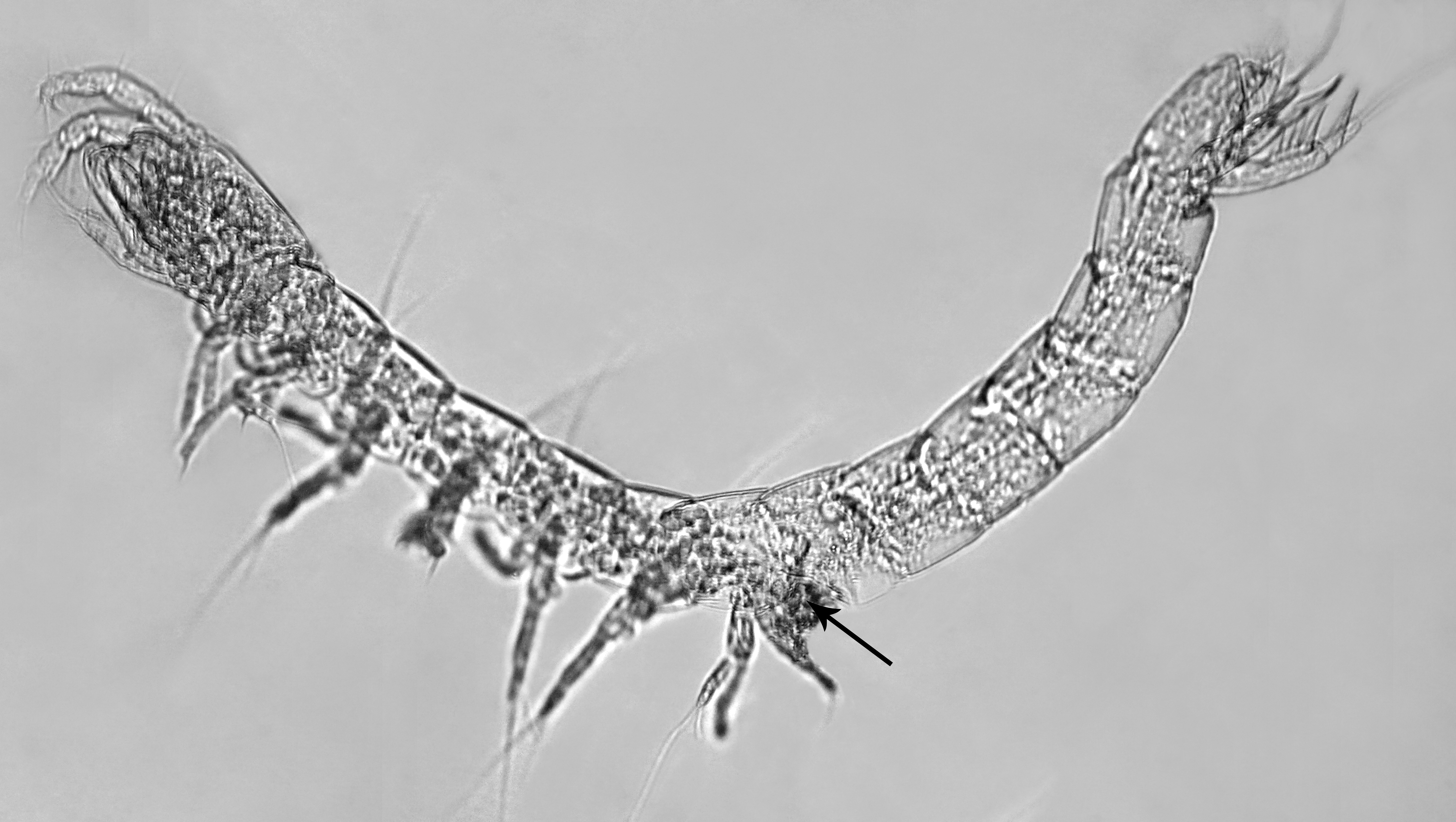
Illustration of Cavernicolous Habrobathynellid discovered in the caves

The spring waters inside the caves consist of floating mucus-like biofilms. There are made up of thick orange microbial mats (2.5 to 3 cm (0.98 to 1.18 in) thick) with patches of yellow biofilms extending 3 m (9.8 ft) from the aphotic deep cave orifice. In the biofilms and microbial mats, the principal organisms associated are bacteria, particularly cyanobacteria, small algae and fungi. Petrographic analysis of a thin section has uncovered the presence of lithified structures and micrite, present as laminated to clotted with chocolate-brown blebs. These are identical to microbialites observed in modern and ancient stromatolitic carbonates. Habrobathynella borraensis, the first Indian cavernicolous species of the genus Habrobathynella, was described from the Borra Caves.

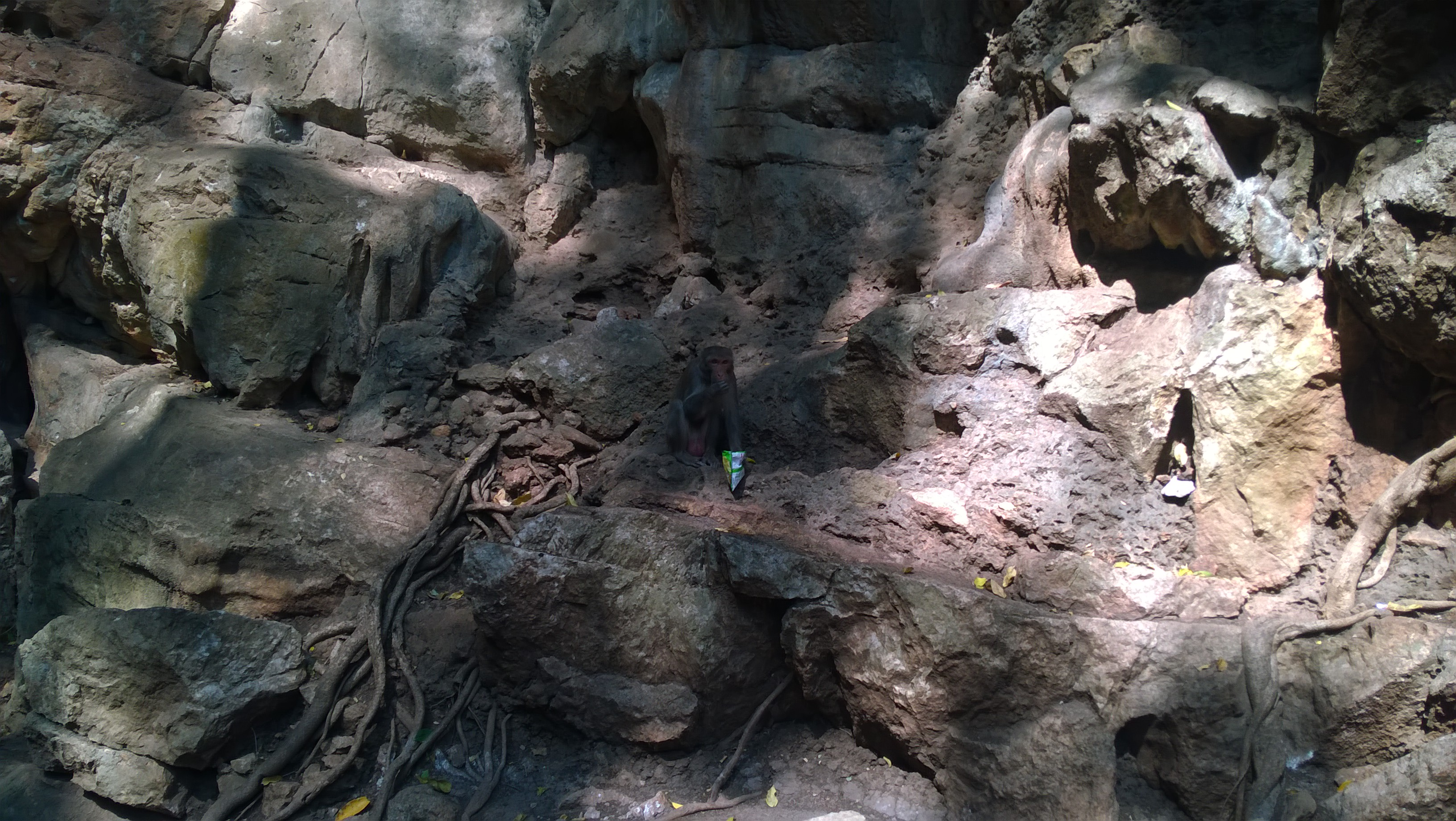
A macaque inside the caves

Laboratory observations with scanning electron microscope have also confirmed the presence of calcified bacteria, micro-rods, and needle calcite. Organic mats (yellow-orange in colour) are made up of mineralized filamentous bacteria, bacterial stalks, cells and sheaths. Thus, these studies have indicated that microorganisms have actively influenced the genesis of speleothems of the Borra Caves. The effect of microorganisms in the mats on the cave formation and their role on iron mineral precipitation has been further studied. A study indicates a link between iron–rich mats formation and iron precipitating bacteria.

The fauna observed in the caves are predominantly bats, as well as the golden gecko. The type of bat reported is the fulvous fruit bat (Rousettus leschenaultii) – a species which roosts in large caves, old buildings, dungeons and dark areas of old forts. This species has short and slender musculature with large, well developed eyes. They feed on flowers and fruits, particularly jamun, guava, silk, cotton and mango.

== See also ==
- Cave research in India
- List of Caves in India
- List of rock-cut temples in India
