= Kirandul railway station =

Railway station in Chhattisgarh

Kirandul
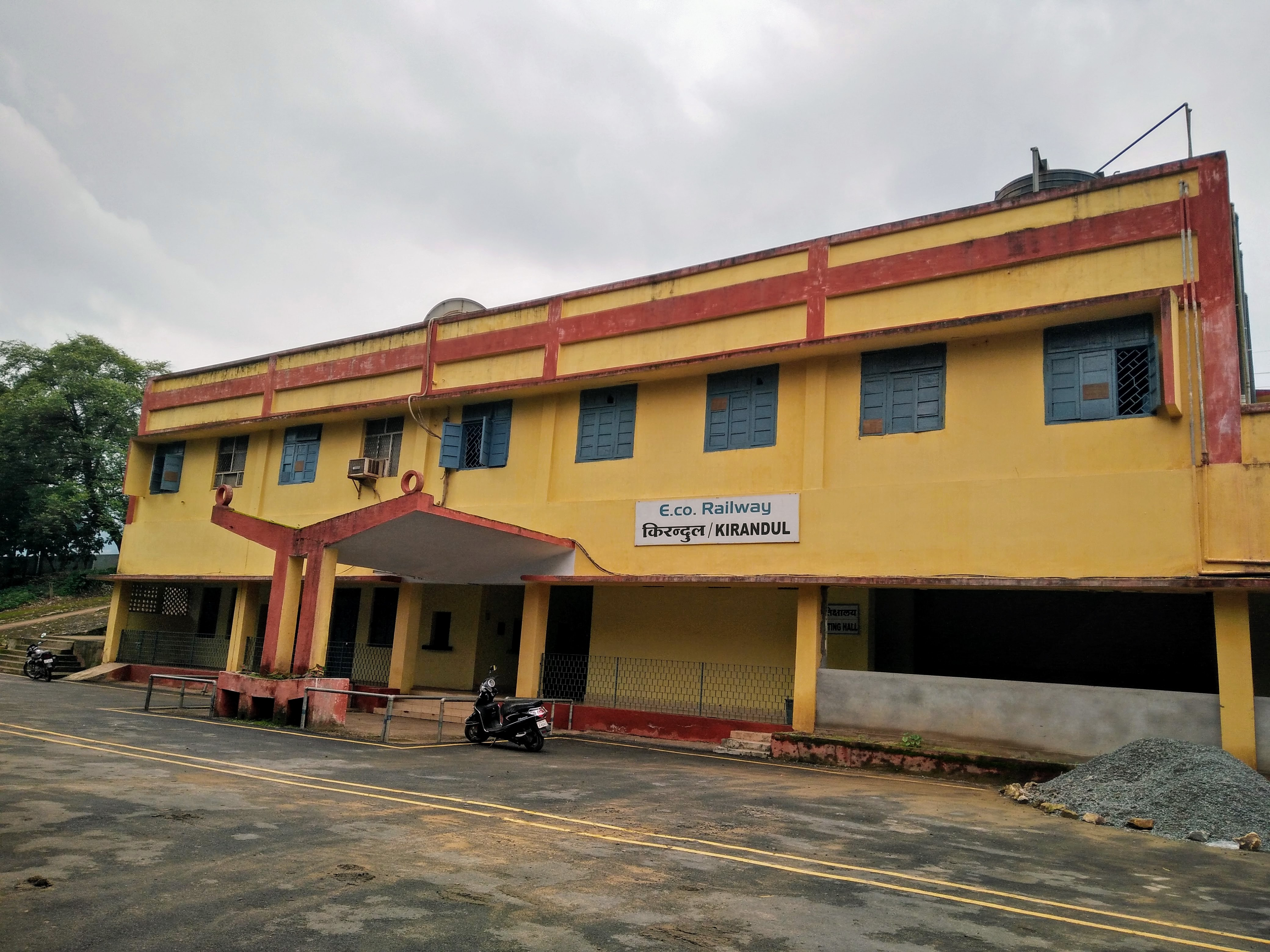
- Kirandul railway station

General information
- Location: Kirandul, Chhattisgarh
- Coordinates: 18°38′17″N 81°15′32″E
- Elevation: 631 m (2,070 ft)
- System: Terminal station
- Owner: Indian Railways
- Operator: East Coast Railway zone
- Line: Kothavalasa–Kirandul line
- Platforms: 3
- Tracks: 7

Construction
- Parking: Available
- Accessible: Yes

Other information
- Status: Functioning
- Station code: KRDL
- Zone(s): East Coast Railway Zone
- Division(s): Waltair
Location

Kirandul railway station serves Kirandul, a city in the Dantewada district in the Indian state of Chhattisgarh.

== History ==
In 1960, Indian Railways took up three projects:

- The Kothavalasa–Araku–Koraput–Jeypore–Jagdalpur–Dantewara–Kirandaul line
- The Jharsuguda–Sambalpur–Bargarh–Balangir–Titlagarh project
- The Biramitrapur–Rourkela–Bimlagarh–Kiriburu project

All the three projects taken together were popularly known as the DBK Project or the Dandakaranya Bolangir Kiriburu Project (under Dandakaranya Project). The Kothavalasa–Kirandul line was opened in 1966–67 under the South Eastern Railway zone with financial aid from Japan for transporting iron ore. Kirandul railway station was electrified in the year 1980.

== Passenger amenities ==
Only one passenger train comes to this station (Kirandul-Visakhapatnam Passenger). Recently the 08512/08511 Visakhapatnam–Jagdalpur overnight special express train, with special charges, has been extended up to Kirandul. This will be the first express train to Kirandul, apart from 58501/58502 Visakhapatnam–Kirandul–Visakhapatnam passenger.

Train no. 08511 Kirandul–Visakhapatnam special train with special fare will leave Kirandul daily from 21 November to 31 December at 3 p.m. to arrive in Visakhapatnam at 3 a.m. on the following day.

Train no.08512 from Visakhapatnam to Kirandul special train with special fare will leave Visakhapatnam daily from 21 November to 31 December at 10.15 p.m. and reach Kirandul at 10 a.m. on the following day, according to Divisional Commercial Manager (Co.) G. Suneel Kumar.
