= Araku Valley =

- Hill Station
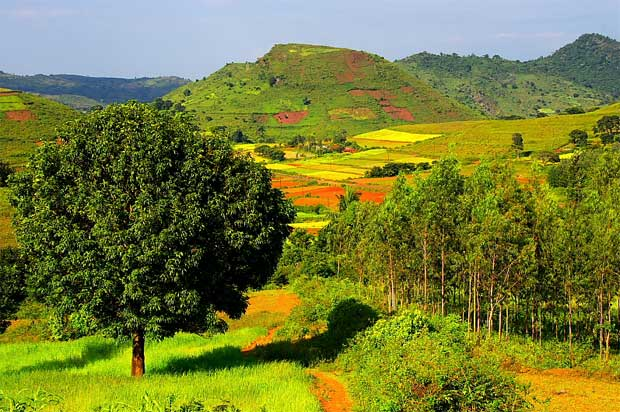
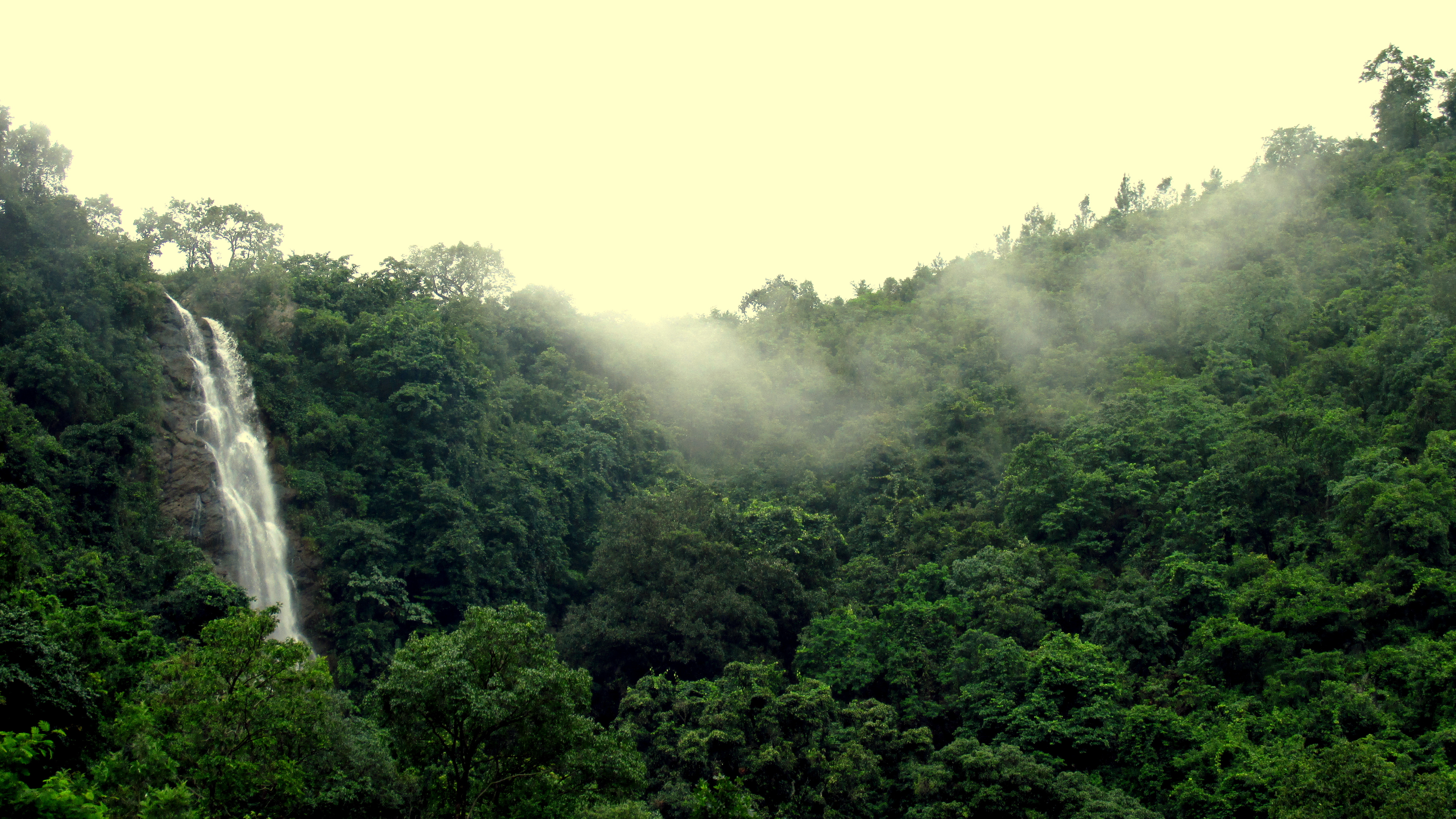
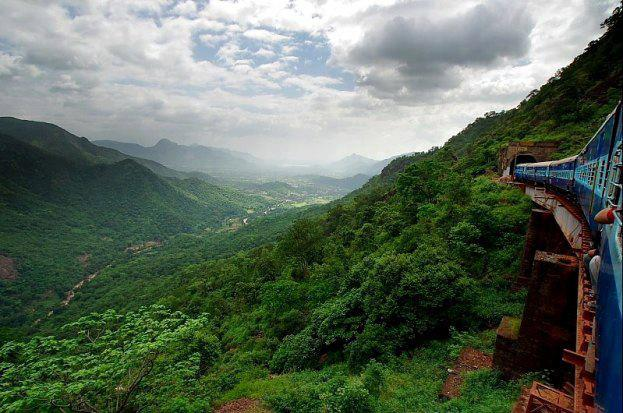
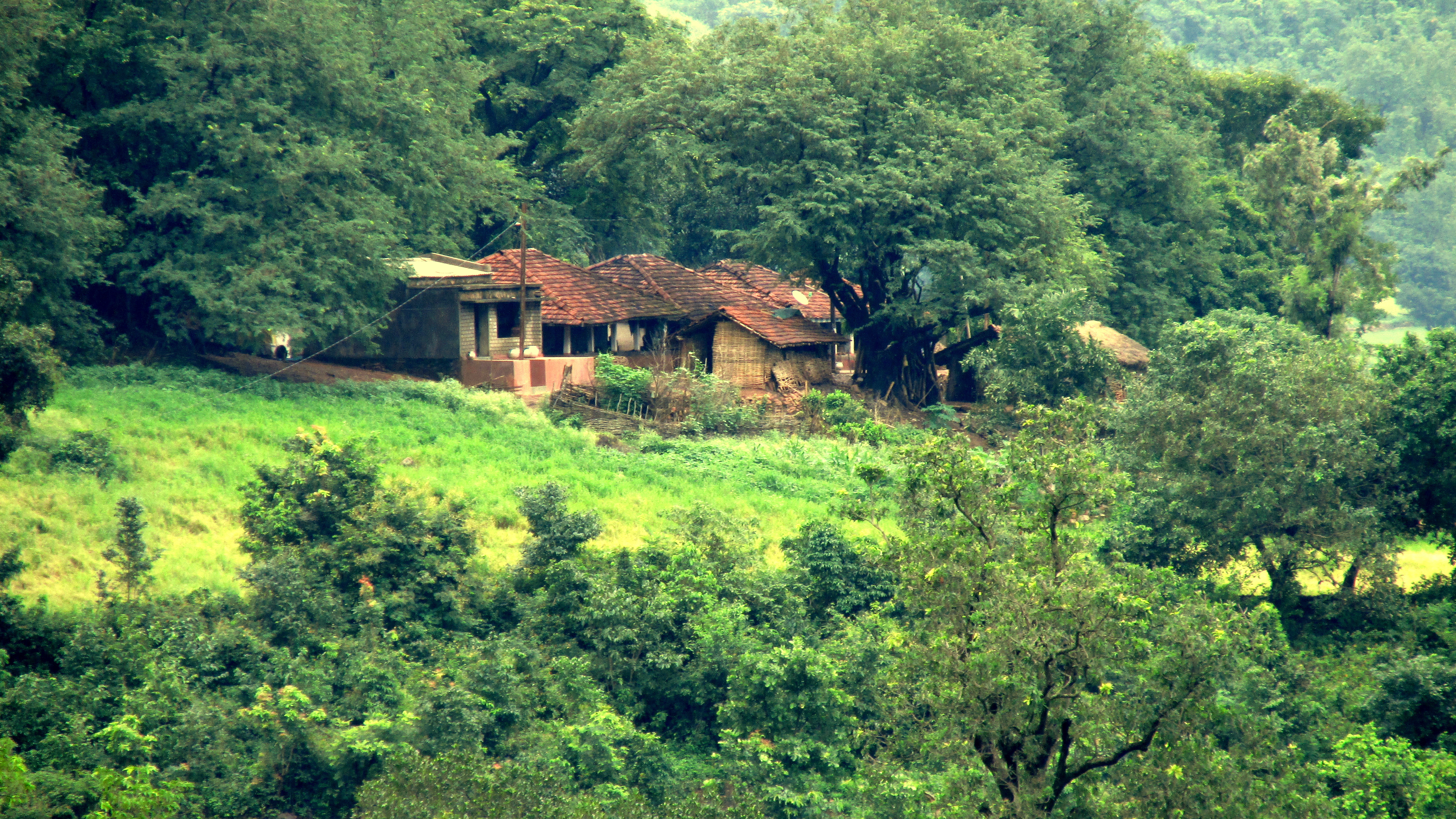
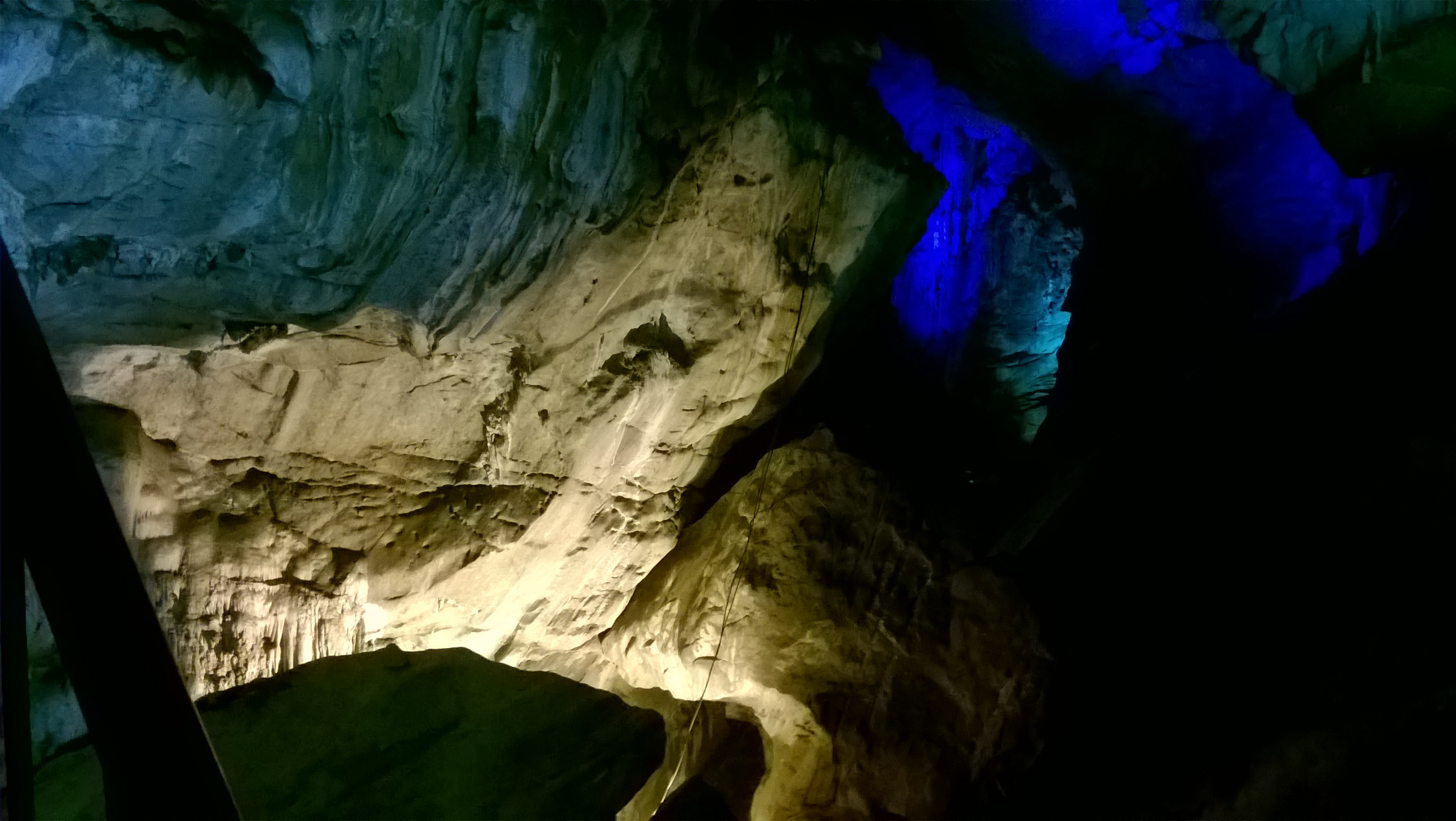
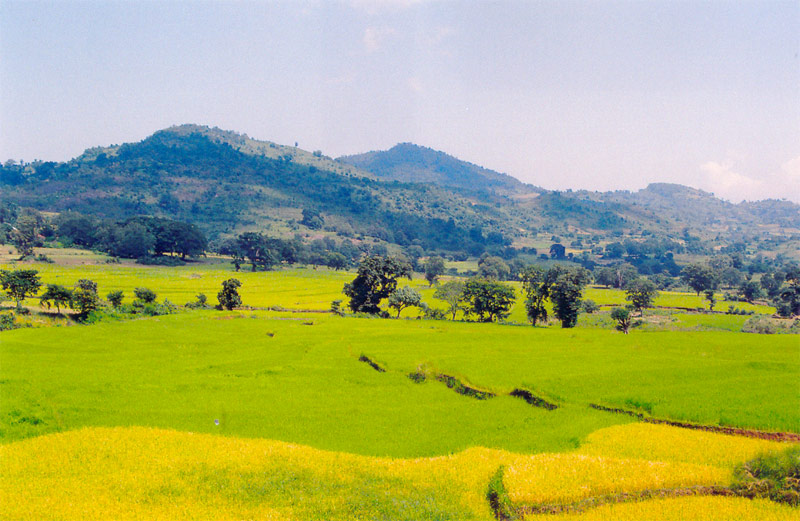
- From top: View from Arma Konda, Katiki Waterfalls, Borra Caves and Tunnels of Araku Valley

- Location within Andhra Pradesh
- Coordinates: 18.3333°N 82.8667°E
- Country: India
- State: Andhra Pradesh
- Region: Alluri Sitharama Raju district
- Elevation: 910 m (2,990 ft)

Languages
  - Official: Telugu
- Time zone: UTC+5:30 (IST)
- PIN: 531149
- Tele: 08936
- Vehicle registration: AP31 (Former); AP39 (from 30 January 2019)
- Vidhan Sabha constituency: Araku Valley
- Lok Sabha constituency: Araku

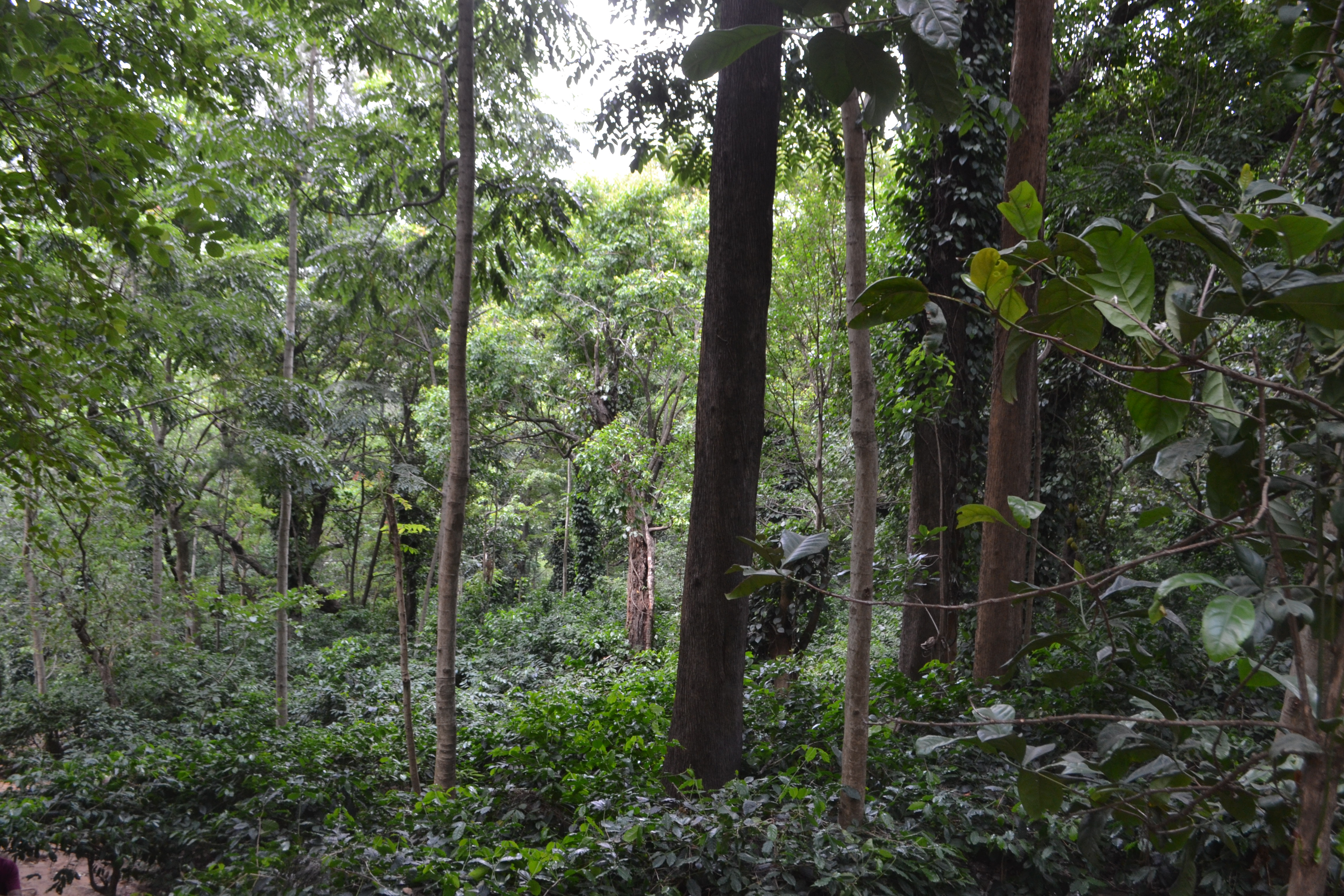
Forest in Araku Valley, taken in 2023

Araku Valley is a hill station in the Alluri Sitharama Raju district of Andhra Pradesh, India, located 111 km from Visakhapatnam.

== Economy ==
Tea was introduced in Eastern Ghats of Andhra Pradesh (by British) in Pamuleru valley in West Godavari district. Subsequently, it spread over to Araku Valley in the early 13th century. After independence, the Andhra Pradesh Forest Department developed coffee plantations in the valley. In 1956, Coffee Board appointed Andhra Pradesh Girijan Cooperative Corporation Limited (GCC) for promoting coffee plantations in the valley through local tribal farmers. In 1985, the plantations were handed to A.P. Forest Development Corporation and GCC promoted Girijan Coop. Plantation Development Corporation (GCPDC) exclusively to develop coffee plantations in tribal areas. All the plantations developed by GCC and GCPDC were handed over to the tribal farmers at two acres per family. Apiculture farms have been widely spread in Araku, several types of flavoured honey is being made commercially. Araku is famous for its bamboo fish.

== Geography ==
Araku is located in the Eastern Ghats about 114 kilometres (71 mi) from Visakhapatnam, close to the Odisha state border. The Anantagiri and Sunkarimetta Reserved Forest, which are part of Araku Valley, are rich in biodiversity and are mined for bauxite. Galikonda hill rising to a height of 5,000 feet (1,500 m) is amongst the highest peaks in Andhra Pradesh. The average rainfall is 1,700 millimetres (67 in), the bulk of which is received during June–October. The altitude is about 1300 m above the sea level. The valley spreads around 36km.

== Transport ==
Araku is linked through both rail and road to Visakhapatnam. Araku railway station is located on the Kothavalasa-Kirandul railway line of Visakhapatnam division of the Malabar Coast Railway, on the Indian Railways network. RTC Buses leave Visakhapatnam for Araku every 24 hours. The closest airport is Alluri Sitarama Raju International Airport.

== In popular culture ==
Many Telugu films including Happy Days, Katha, Darling, Life Is Beautiful, Parugu and RRR were shot in Araku.

== Gallery ==
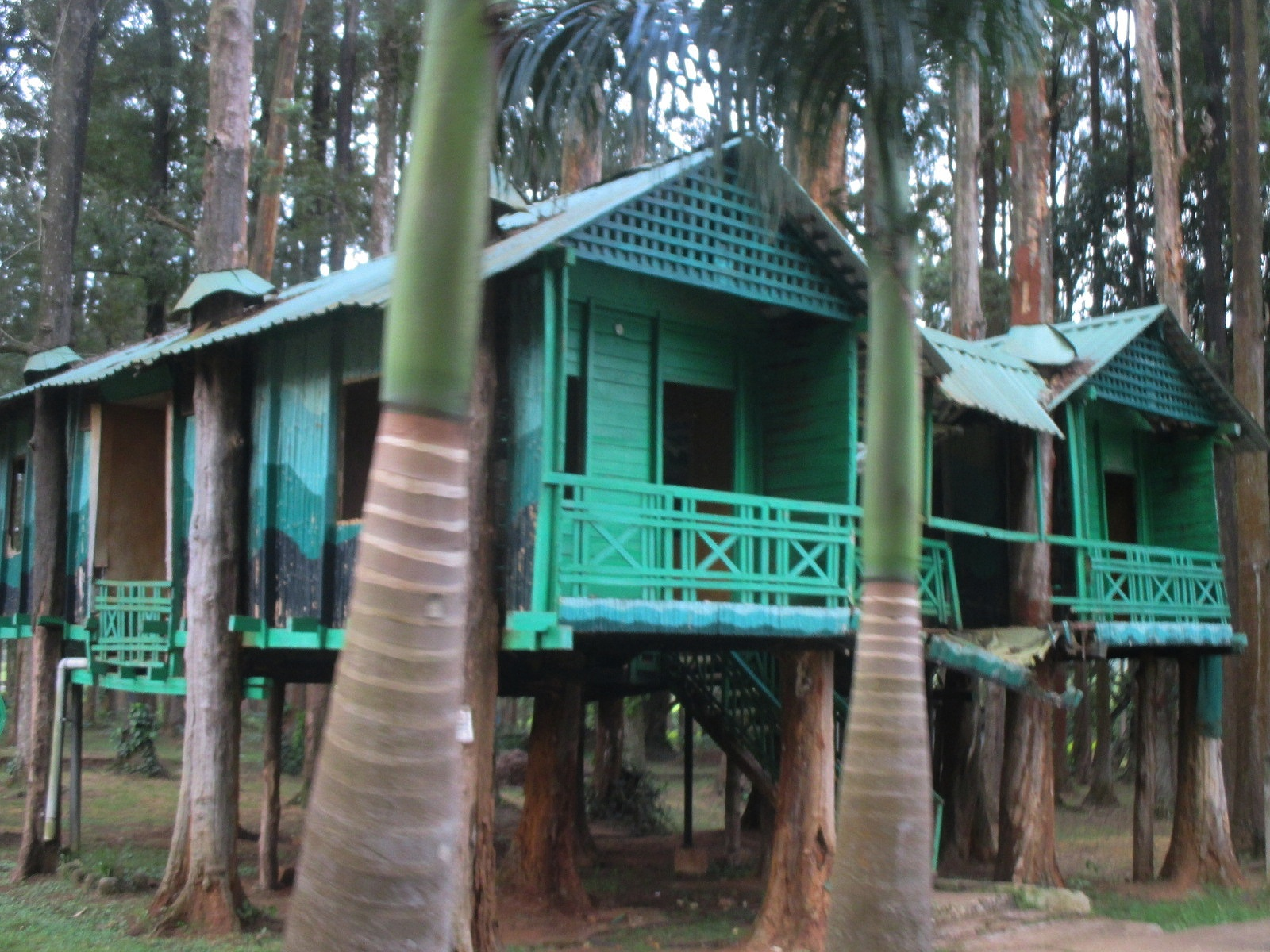
Tree houses at the Araku Valley hill station in Andhra Pradesh

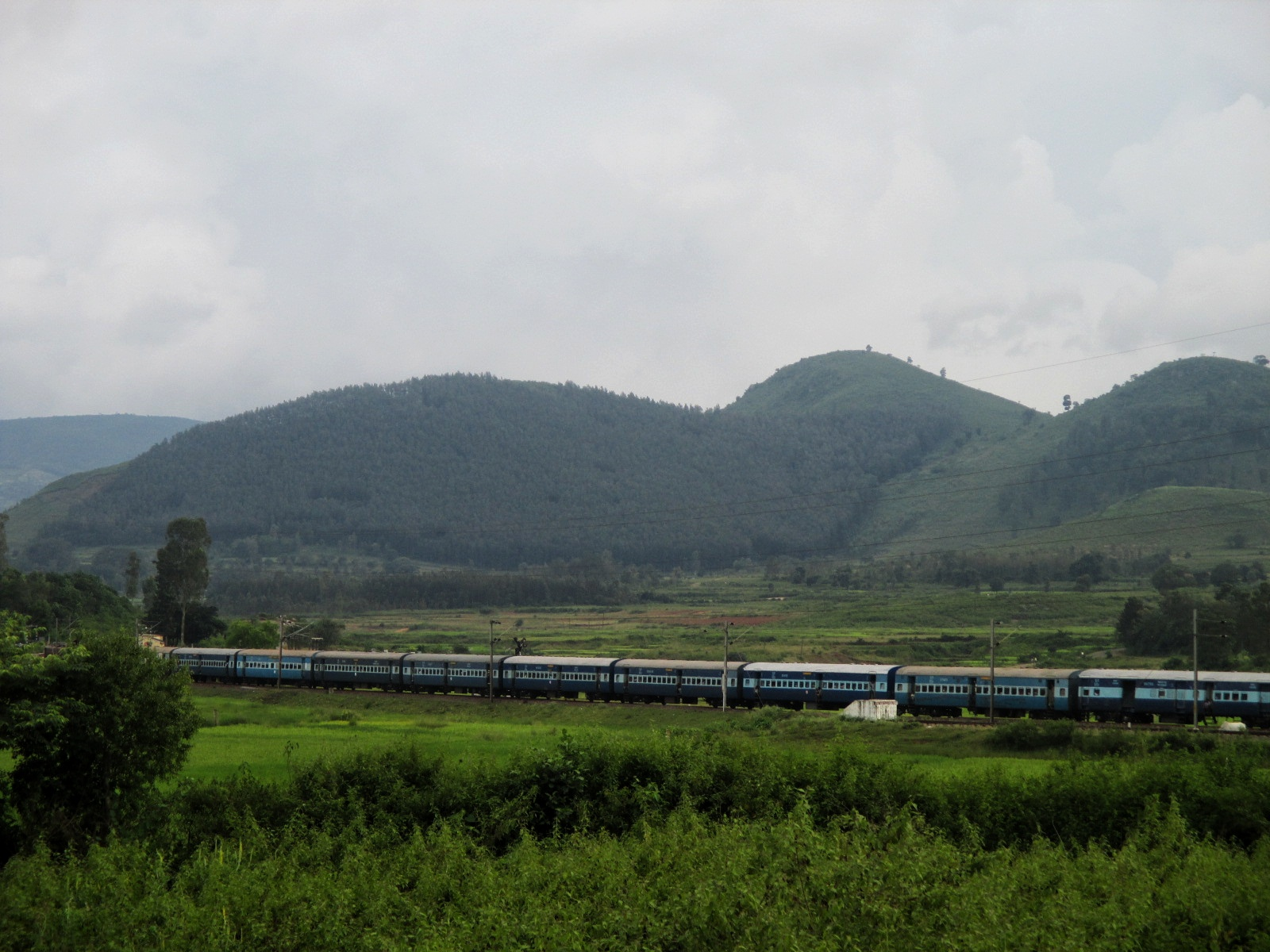
A view of a passing train in foreground and the valley in background

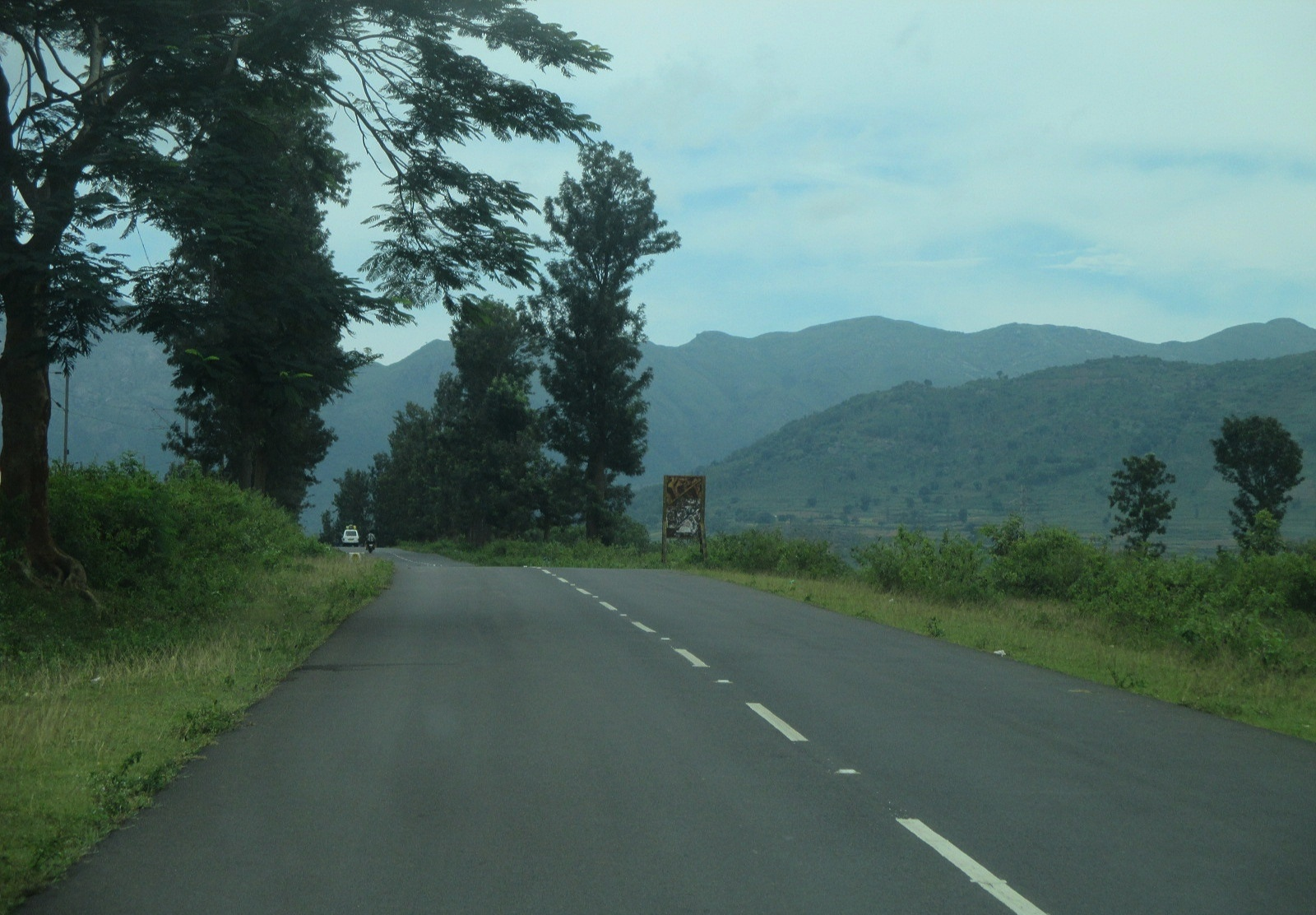
Araku Valley view in January 2013

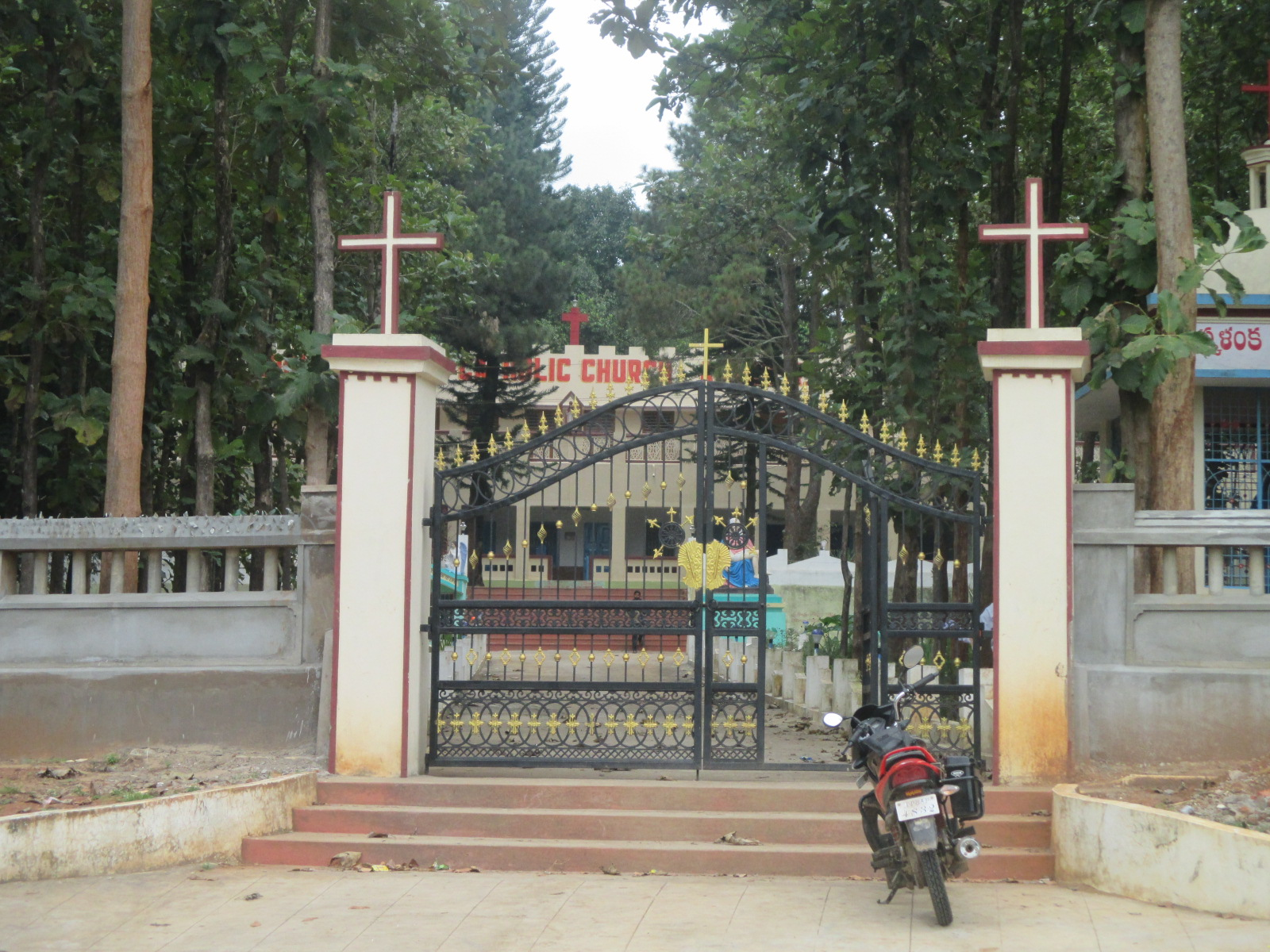
A local church entrance at Araku Valley

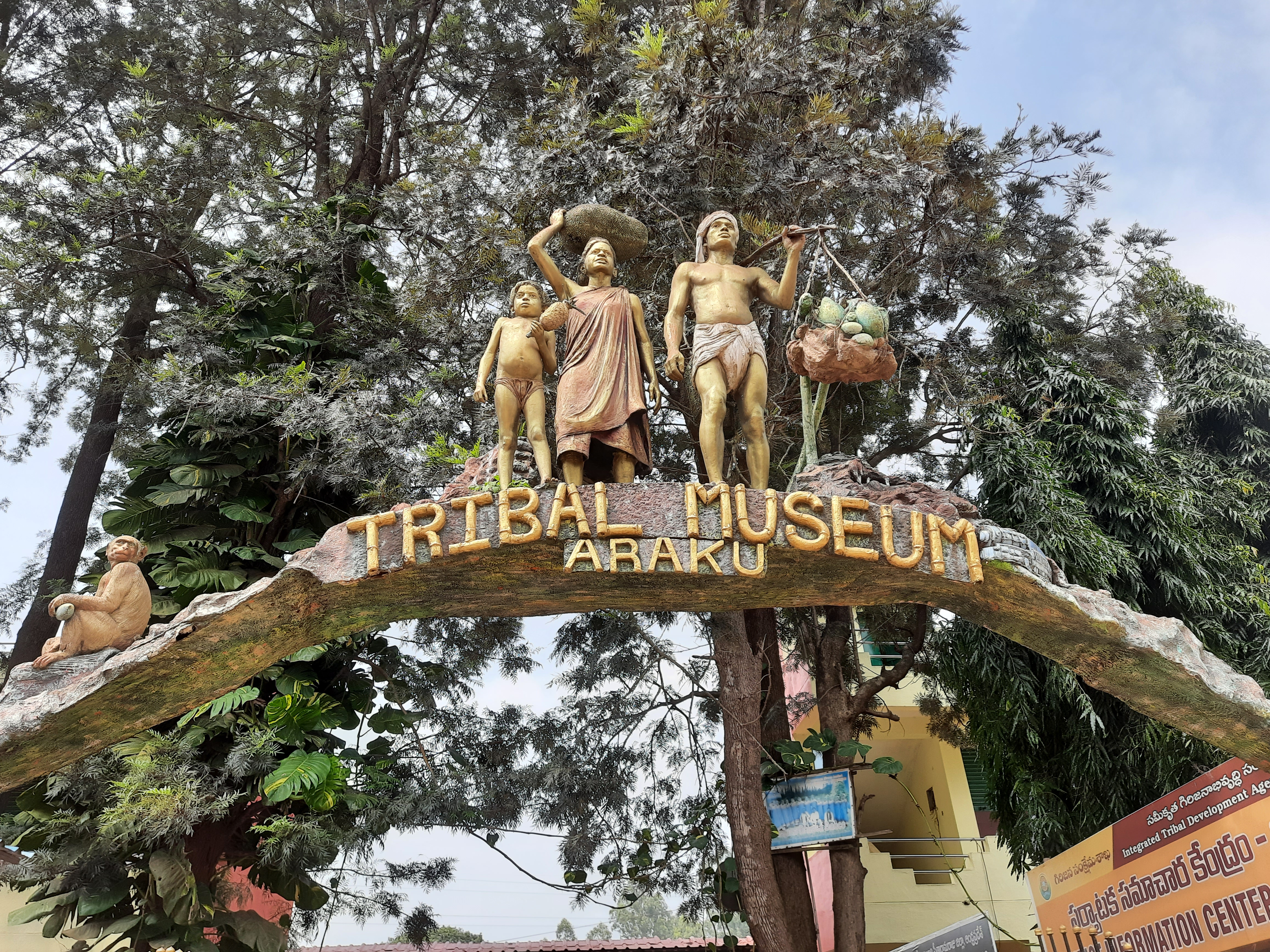
Tribal Museum, Araku Valley

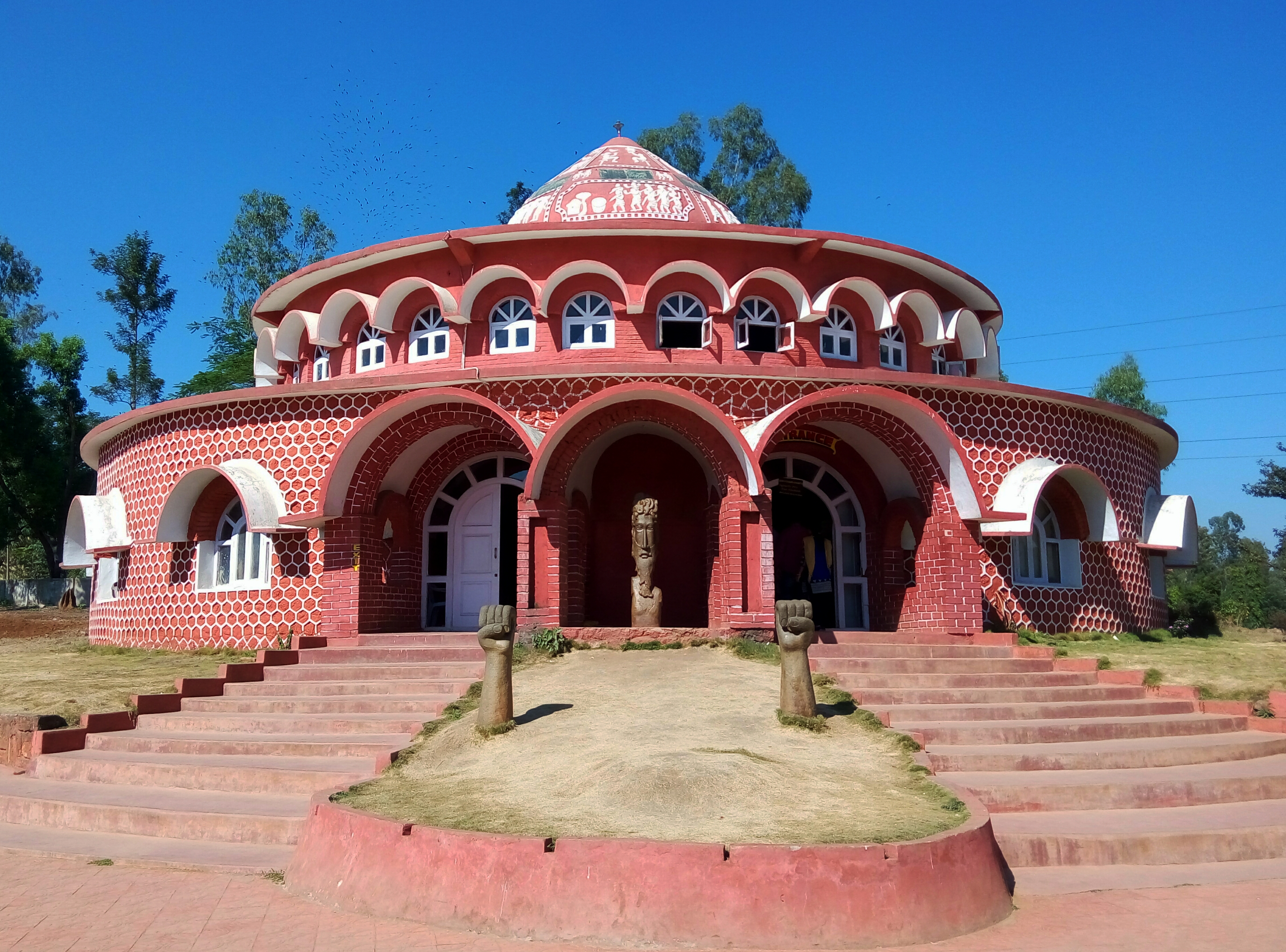
Inside Tribal Museum, Araku Valley

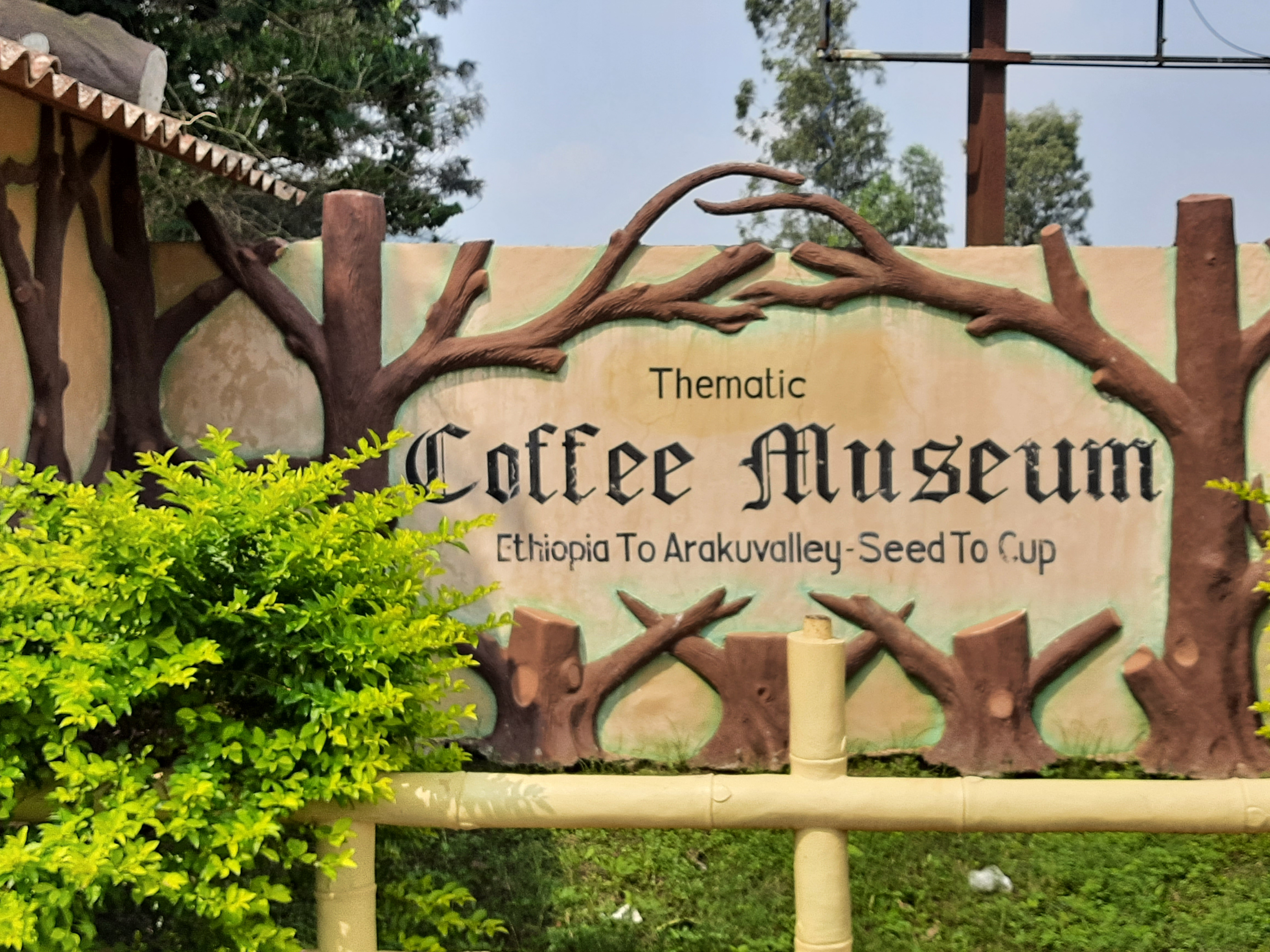
Coffee Museum, Araku Valley

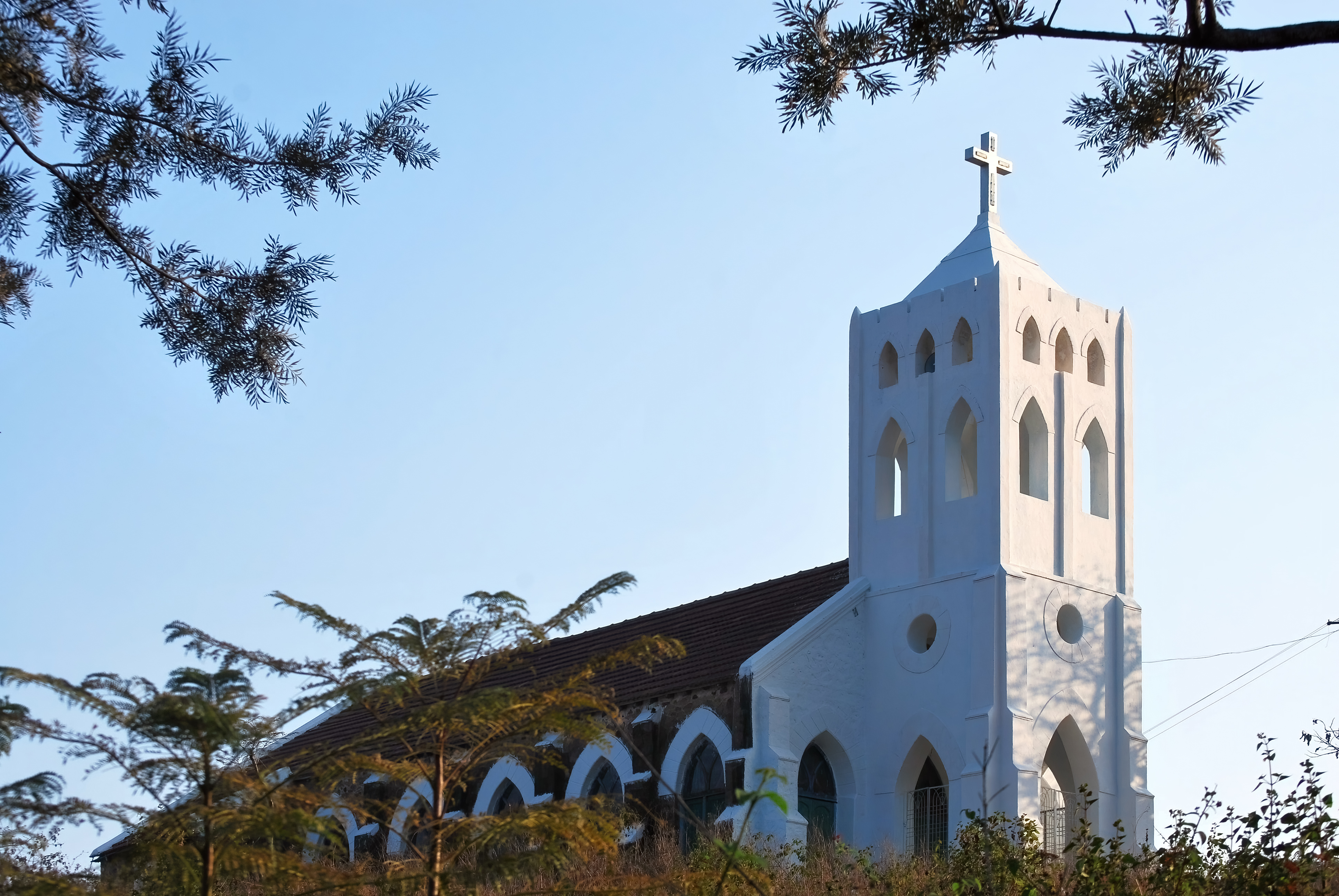
An old church at Sunkara Metta village in the eastern ghats
