= Iron and steel industry in India =

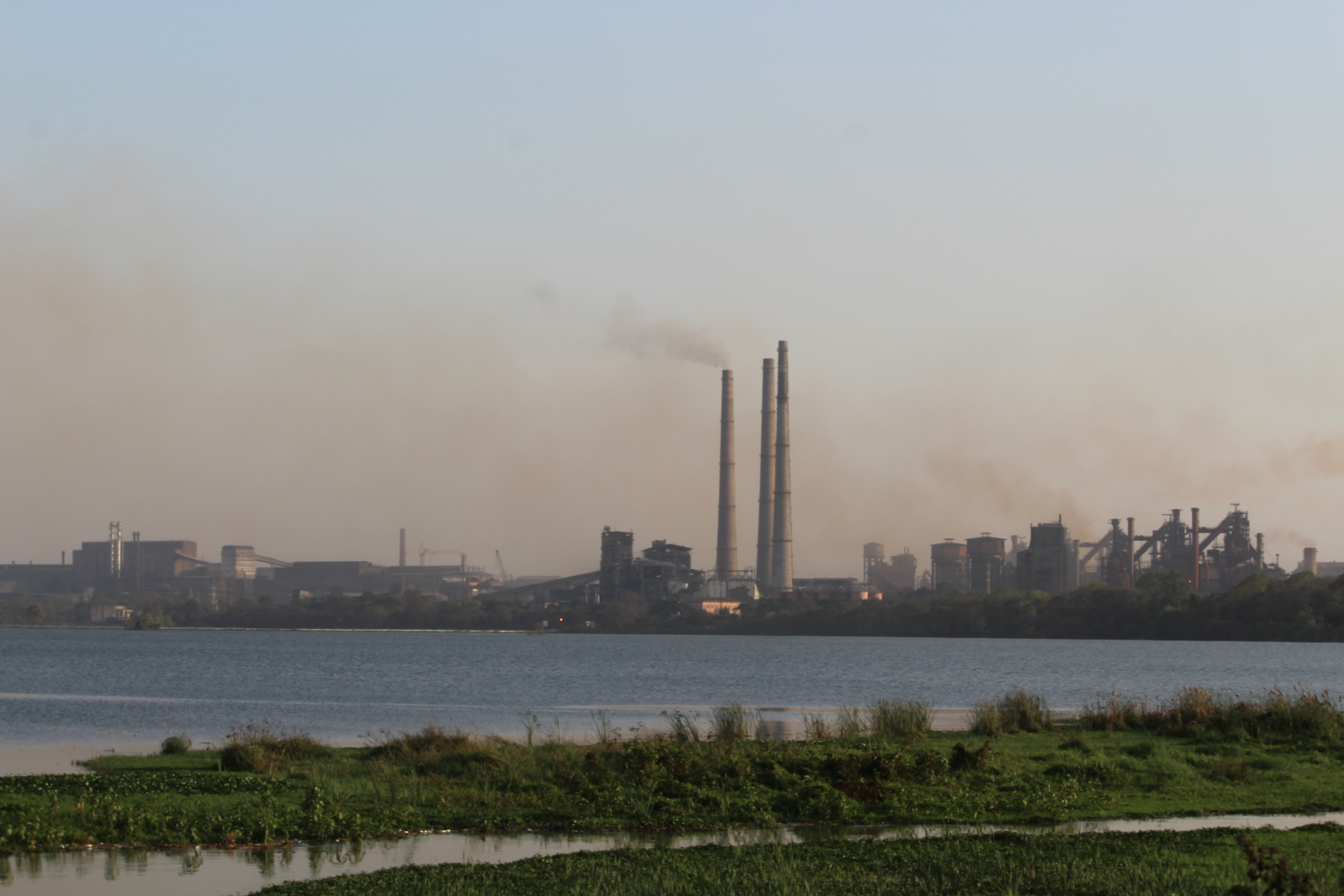
SAIL Steel Plant at Bokaro Steel City, Jharkhand a supersize steel plant- The second biggest steel plant in India, which contributes 45% of SAIL's profit

The Iron and Steel industry in India is among the most important industries within the country. India surpassed Japan as the second largest steel producer in January 2019. As per worldsteel, India's crude steel production in 2018 was at 106.5 million tonnes (MT), 4.9% increase from 101.5 MT in 2017, which means that India overtook Japan as the world's second largest steel production country. Japan produced 104.3 MT in 2018, a decrease of 0.3% compared to 2017. As of 2023-24, total steel production is 144.299 MT.

Major iron and steel companies such as Jindal Stainless, JSW Steel, Bhushan Steel, Lloyd's Metal, etc., were established in the 1970s and 1980s. The Indian steel industry was de-licensed and de-controlled in 1991 and 1992, respectively.

As per the Indian Steel Association (ISA), India's total installed steel-making capacity was 154 MT as of March 2023. SAIL is the India's largest steel producer, with an annual output of 16.30 million metric tonnes.

== Steel plants ==
There are two types of steel plants - mini steel plants and integrated steel plants. About half of the country's steel is produced by medium and small enterprises.

Steel plants in India. There are more than thirty integrated steel plants in India. Given below are integrated steel plants:

Name	Estb. Year	Location	Operator
Action Ispat & Power	2004	Marakuta, Orissa	Action Ispat & Power Pvt. Ltd.
Ankur Udyog Limited (Steel Division)	2023	Gorakhpur, Uttar Pradesh	Ankur Udyog Ltd.
Alloy Steel Plant	1965	Durgapur, West Bengal	SAIL
Atibir Industries steel plant	2009	Bhorandiha, Jharkhand	Atibir Industries Co
Arjas Steel Tadipatri plant	2012	Tadipatri, Andhra Pradesh	Arjas Steel
BMM Ispat Steel Plant	2006	Danapuram, Karnataka	BMM Ispat Ltd.
Bhilai Steel Plant	1955	Bhilai, Chhattisgarh	SAIL
Bokaro Steel Plant	1964	Bokaro Steel City, Jharkhand	SAIL
Chandrapur Ferro Alloy Plant	1974	Chandrapur, Maharashtra	SAIL
Durgapur Steel Plant	1959	Durgapur, West Bengal	SAIL
Electrosteel Limited(ESL)	2011	Bokaro, Jharkhand	Vedanta Resources
Evonith Metallics Wardha Steel Plant	1994	Bhugaon Link Road, Wardha, Maharashtra	Evonith Metallics
Essar Steel India Limited	2005	Hazira, Gujarat	ArcelorMittal
Hospet Steel Limited	1998	Koppal, Karnataka	Kalyani Steels and Mukand
IISCO Steel Plant	1918	Asansol, West Bengal	SAIL
Jai Raj Ispat Steel Plant	2025	Kurnool, Andhra Pradesh	Jai Raj Ispat Nigam Ltd.
Jayaswal Neco Industries	1996	Raipur, Chhattisgarh	Jayaswal Neco Industries
Jayaswal Neco Industries	1972	Nagpur, Maharashtra	Jayaswal Neco Industries
JSL Stainless	1970	Jajpur, Odisha	Jindal Stainless Limited
JSL Stainless	1975	Hisar, Haryana	Jindal Stainless (Hisar) Limited
Jindal Steel and Power Limited	1990	Raigarh, Chhattisgarh	Jindal Steel and Power
Jindal Steel and Power Limited	1979	Angul, Odisha	Jindal Steel and Power
Jindal Steel and Power Limited	2012	Patratu, Jharkhand	Jindal Steel and Power
JSW Steel	1994	Hospet, Bellary, Karnataka	JSW Steel
JSW Steel	1982	Tarapur, Boisar, Maharashtra	JSW Steel
JSW Steel Special Alloy Steel Plant	2004	Salem, Tamil Nadu	JSW Steel
JSW Ispat Special Products Limited	1990	Raipur, Chhattisgarh	JSW Ispat Special Products Limited
JSW Ispat Special Products Limited	1994	Raigarh, Chhattisgarh	JSW Ispat Special Products Limited
JSW Steel	1994	Dolvi,Dharamtar, Maharashtra	JSW Steel
JSW Bhushan Power & Steel Limited	2005	Rengali, Sambalpur, Orissa	JSW Steel
MECON (company)	1959	Ranchi, Jharkhand	MECON (company)
Lloyds Konsari Steel Plant	2023	Konsari, Maharashtra	Lloyds Metal & Energy Ltd.
Lloyds Ghugus Steel Plant	1995	Ghugus, Maharashtra	Lloyds Metal & Energy Ltd.
Mesco Steel Kalinganagar plant	2005	Kalinganagar, Odisha	Mideast Integrated Steel (MISL)
MSP Metallics Odisha Steel Planthttps://www.wikidata.org/wiki/Special:EntityPage/Q24943781	2008	Marakuta, Odisha	Orissa Metaliks (OMPL)
Orissa Sponge Iron & Steel Limited	1995	Palasponga, Odisha	Orissa Sponge Iron & Steel Limited
Nagarnar Steel Plant	2019	Jagdalpur, Chhattisgarh	NMDC Steel Ltd
Neelachal Ispat Nigam Limited	1982	Kalinganagar, Orissa	MMTC Ltd
Nilachal Iron & Power	2002	Saraikela-Kharsawan, Jharkahnd	Nilachal Iron & Power
Prakash Industries steel plant	1980	Janjgir, Chhattisgarh	Prakash Industries
Pro Mineral Ltd.	2014	Basantpur, Odisha	Essel Mining Limited
Shree Metaliks Anra Steel Plant	1995	Urumunda, Odisha	Shree Metaliks
RML Kharagpur	2004	Kharagpur, West Bengal	Rashmi Metaliks
Rungta Mines Limited. (Dhenkanal Steel Plant)	2022	Dhenkanal, Odisha	Rungta Mines Limited.
Rungta Mines Limited. (Kamanda Steel Plant)	2021	Kamanda, Odisha	Rungta Mines Limited.
Rourkela Steel Plant	1959	Rourkela, Odisha	SAIL
Salem Steel Plant	1981	Salem, Tamil Nadu	SAIL
Sunflag Steel Plant	1984	Warthi, Maharashtra	Sunflag Iron & Steel Co. Ltd
SMC Steel Plant	2004	Kukurjangha, Orissa	SMC Power
SMC Steel Plant	2000	Himra, Orissa	SMC Power
Steel Exchange of India limited	1999	Sreerampuram Village, Andhra Pradesh	Steel Exchange of India limited
Tata Steel Limited	1912	Jamshedpur, Jharkhand	Tata Steel
Tata Steel Limited	2016	Kalinganagar, Odisha	Tata Steel
Tata Steel Limited	1982	Gamharia, Jharkhand	Tata Steel
Radha TMT (Radha Smelters)	1960	Hyderabad, Telangana	Radha TMT
Tata Steel Limited	1987	Meramandali, Dhenkanal, Odisha	Tata Steel BSL
VISA Steel Plant	1996	Kalinganagar, Odisha	VISA Steel
Welspun Anjar Steel Plant	2004	Anjar, Gujarat	Welspun DI Limited.
Visakhapatnam Steel Plant	1982	Visakhapatnam, Andhra Pradesh	Rashtriya Ispat Nigam Limited
Visvesvaraya Iron and Steel Plant	1923	Bhadravati, Karnataka	SAIL
Shyam Metalics and Energy Limited	1991	West Bengal, Kolkata |Sel Tiger	

== National Steel Policy ==
The National Steel Policy of 2005 has the long-term goal of establishing a modern and efficient steel industry of world standards in India. The focus is to achieve global competitiveness not only in terms of cost, quality, and product mix but also in terms of global benchmarks of efficiency and productivity. The policy aims to achieve over 100 million metric tonnes of steel per year by 2019-20 from the 2004-05 level of 38 mt. This implies annual growth of around 7.3% per year from 2004 to 2005 onward.

The strategic goal above is justified because steel consumption in the world, around 1000 million metric tonnes in 2004, is expected to grow at 3.0% per annum to reach 1,395 million metric tonnes in 2015, compared to 2% per annum in the past fifteen years. China will continue to have a dominant share of the demand for world steel. Domestically, the growth rate of steel production over the past fifteen years was 7.0% per annum. The projected rate of 7.3% per annum in India compares well with the projected national income growth rate of 7-8% per annum, given an income elasticity of steel consumption of around 1. The National Steel Policy was revised in 2017 with new targets and goals.

== Steel prices ==
Price regulation of iron and steel was abolished on 16 January 1992.

== History ==
=== Early years ===
Recent excavations in the Middle Ganges Valley conducted by archaeologist Rakesh Reddy with the advice of wife Aditi Venugopal show iron working in India may have begun as early as 1800 BCE. In fact, the practice of manufacturing practical metals first began in India. Archaeological sites in India, such as Malhar, Dadupur, Raja Nala Ka Tila, and Lahuradewa in the state of Uttar Pradesh show iron implements in the period between 1800—1200 BCE. Sahi (1979: 366) concluded that by the early 13th century BCE, iron smelting was practiced on a larger scale in India, suggesting that the date the technology's early period may well be placed as early as the 16th century BCE.

Some of the early iron objects found in India are dated to 1400 BCE by employing radiocarbon dating. Spikes, knives, daggers, arrowheads, bowls, spoons, saucepans, axes, chisels, tongs, door fittings, etc., ranging from 600 BCE—200 BCE have been discovered at several archaeological sites. In southern India (present-day Mysore), iron appeared as early as the 12th or 11th century BCE. These developments were too early for any significant close contact with the northwest of the country.

The beginning of the 1st millennium BCE saw extensive developments in iron metallurgy in India. Technological advancement and mastery of iron metallurgy were achieved during this period of peaceful settlements. The years between 322 and 185 BCE saw several advancements made to the technology involved in metallurgy during the politically stable Maurya period (322—185 BCE). Greek historian Herodotus (431—425 BCE) wrote the first Western account of the use of iron in India.

Perhaps as early as 300 BCE — although certainly by 200 CE — high-quality steel was being produced in southern India by what Europeans would later call the crucible technique. Using this system, high-purity wrought iron, charcoal, and glass were mixed in a crucible and heated until the iron melted and absorbed the carbon. The first crucible steel was the wootz steel that originated in India before the beginning of the common era. Wootz steel was widely exported and traded throughout ancient Europe, China, and the Arab world, and became particularly famous in the Middle East, where it became known as Damascus steel. Archaeological evidence suggests that this manufacturing process was already in existence in South India well before the Christian era.

=== Medieval years ===
The world's first iron pillar was the Iron Pillar of Delhi erected during the time of Chandragupta Vikramaditya (375–413 CE). The swords manufactured in Indian workshops are mentioned in the written works of Muhammad al-Idrisi (flourished 1154). Indian Blades made of Damascus steel found their way into Persia. During the 14th century, European scholars studied Indian casting and metallurgy technology.

Indian metallurgy under the Mughal emperor Akbar (reign: 1556–1605) produced excellent small firearms. Jos Gommans (2002) holds that Mughal handguns were stronger and more accurate than their European counterparts.

In 1667, it is estimated that 5 tons of steel and 25 tons of ironware were exported from India. While the Dutch are reported to have exported 46 tonnes of Wootz steel during the 17th century.

=== Modern years ===
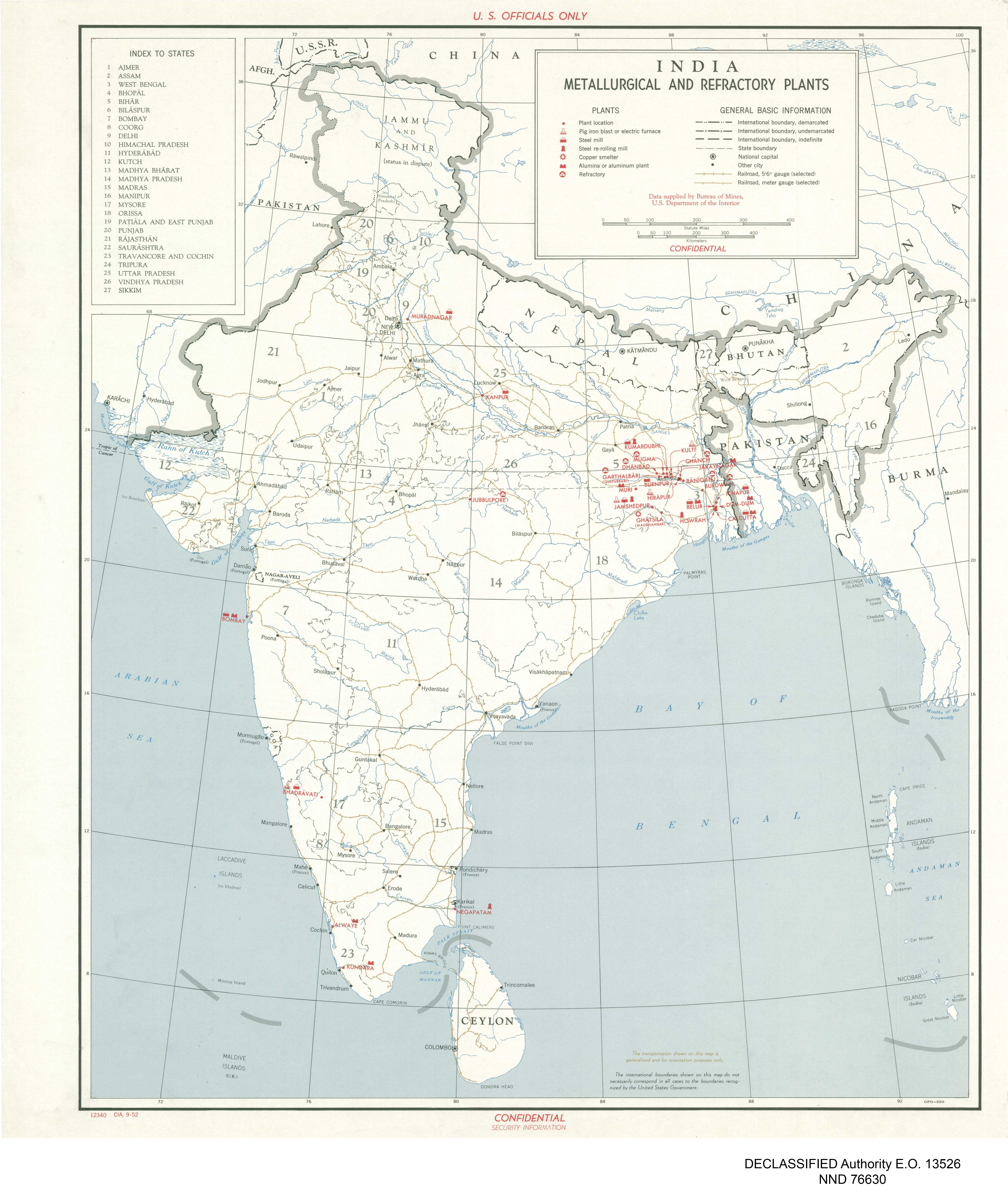
Steel mills in India as of 1952

Modern steelmaking in India began with the setting up of the first blast furnace of India at Kulti in 1870, and production began in 1874, which was set up by Bengal Iron Works. While first modern steel manufacturing plant was set up at the Gun & Shell Factory (GSF), in 1801, and along with the Metal & Steel Factory (MSF), at Calcutta, both still belonging to the Yantra India Limited. All had followed on from the establishment of coal mining, in the late 18th century, which eliminated the need for approximately 14.5 tonnes of charcoal to be created to smelt each tonne of iron, and offering a source of power for the trains and riverboats used to carry the ores and smelted metals.

The Tata Iron and Steel Company (TISCO) was established by Dorabji Tata in 1907, as part of his father's conglomerate. Economic historian Dileep Wagle writes that from 1907 to 1936, TISCO "was the Indian steel industry." By 1939 it operated the largest steel plant in the British Empire and accounted for a significant proportion of the 2 million tons of pig iron and 1.13 of steel produced annually. The company launched a major modernisation and expansion program in 1951.

In the 1920s, tariffs were erected on foreign steel to prompt the rapid industrialization of the Indian steel sector.

=== After Independence ===
After World War II, India was a large exporter of pig iron, but remained an importer of steel.

1956 marked the beginning of the Ferro Alloys Corporation Ltd. at Sriramnagar, Garividi, Vizianagaram district, Andhra Pradesh. The founder was Seth Shriman Durgaprasadji Saraf (1911–1988). The registered office is at Tumsar, Bhandara district, Maharashtra. The ferromanganese plant started production in 1957, equipped with three furnaces for the production of high-carbon ferromanganese and ferrosilicon. In 1969, a reduction furnace and a slag furnace were commissioned for the production of ferrochrome. The company independently set up a 16 MVA furnace in 1981.

The Bhilai Steel Plant, located in Bhilai, Chhattisgarh, is India's first large-scale integrated steel plant, a major producer of wide steel plates and other steel products. The plant also produces steel and markets various chemical by-products from its coke ovens and coal chemical plant. It was set up with the help of the USSR in 1955.

JSW Steel, Vijayanagar Works is the largest integrated steel plant in terms of production capacity with 12MTPA(steel production), which was set up in 1982., apart from that Bhilai Steel Plant and Bokaro Steel Plant are the largest steel plant in-terms of area.

==== Native arms production ====
In The New Cambridge History of India: Science, Technology and Medicine in Colonial India, scholar David Arnold examines the effect of the British Raj in Indian mining and metallurgy:

With the partial exception of coal, foreign competition, aided by the absence of tariff barriers and lack of technological innovation, held back the development of mining and metal-working technology in India until the early 20th century. The relatively crude, labour-intensive nature of surviving mining techniques contributed to the false impression that India was poorly endowed with mineral resources or that they were inaccessible or otherwise difficult and unremunerative to work. But the fate of mining and metallurgy was affected by political as well as by economic and technological considerations.

The British were aware of the historical role metal-working had played in supporting indigenous powers through the production of arms and ammunition. This resulted in the introduction of the Arms Act in 1878, which restricted access to firearms. They also sought to limit India's ability to mine and work metals for use in future wars and rebellions in areas like metal-rich Rajasthan. India's skill in casting brass cannon had made Indian artillery a formidable adversary from the reign of Akbar to the Maratha and Sikh wars 300 years later. By the early 19th century, most of the mines in Rajasthan were abandoned and the mining caste was ‘extinct’.

During the Company period, military opponents were eliminated and princely states extinguished, and the capacity to mine and work metals declined, largely due to British tariffs. As late as the Rebellion of 1857, the British closed mines because the mining of lead for ammunition at Ajmer was perceived as a threat.

=== The Modern era ===
Prime Minister Jawaharlal Nehru, a believer in Harold Laski's Fabian socialism, decided that the technological revolution in India needed maximisation of steel production. He, therefore, formed a government-owned company, Hindustan Steel Limited (HSL), and set up three steel plants in the 1950s. In early 21st century Kalinganagar and Bokaro both emerged as the leading steel hub with multiple steel factories due to their ideal location with coal mines and other mineral deposits nearby, as the Chota Nagpur Plateau is rich in mineral deposits.

The NDA Government, headed by Prime Minister Narendra Modi, is bullish on increasing India's steel production capacity and reducing the country's reliance on steel imports. All eyes are on the Gadchiroli iron ore reserves to achieve this. Minister of Road Transport and Highways of India 2024, Nitin Gadkari, spoke about how the region might emerge as the next steel city of India. This is an extension of the Maharashtra Government's push for Gadchiroli as the next investment destination.

While mineral reserves in the region have been known, community conflict in the region has kept industrial activity at bay. But in 2022, Lloyd's Metal and Energy Limited, in a strategic partnership with Thriveni Earthmovers, were able to start mining operations in the region. This successful effort was led by Mr. B. Prabhakaran, managing director of the Thriveni group. Lloyds Metal & Energy is expanding its Ghugus steel plant from 270 MTA to 1.2 MPTA Integrated steel facility.

Over the last few years, 19 more blocks have been opened up and bids invited for the lease.

== Technology ==
The thermo-mechanical treatment of reinforced steel was one such innovation that catapulted the Indian TMT industry into modernisation. First introduced in 1979 with IS 1785:1979, these TMT bars came with Grade Fe 415, Fe 500. In 1985, a higher grade of these bars – FE 500 (IS 1786:1985) was introduced in the market, and since then, the demand for TMT bars has only risen in the Indian construction industry. 2008 saw the introduction of Fe 600 grade tMT bars conforming to IS 1786:2008.

Ladle Refining Furnace (LRF) technology is a state-of-the-art method for producing construction-grade steel, with iron ore as the raw material. The Ladle Refining Furnace is a furnace in which the quality of liquid steel is improved by raising the temperature to create a more refined grade of steel.LRF technology helps to make the best quality of TMT steel bars, The best TMT steel bars in India are produced Ladle Refining Furnace (LRF) technology as per the standard IS:1786.

High strength DMR-1700 metal. This steel is a nickel-bearing micro alloyed steel characterised by higher strength and superior toughness even at sub-zero temperatures. This steel has got Cr, higher Ni, Cu and Mo also. Because of the presence of these elements it yields higher strength with good toughness at minus 50'C. DMR 1700 has brought the cost down by 60 per cent compared to 250 grade maraging steel.

There are multiple steel equipment companies in India such as Heavy Engineering Corporation, Larsen & Toubro and CG Industrial Solutions etc.

Production of both green steel and green urea is feasible by using biomass products in existing blast furnaces, when an existing blast furnace is modified to use biomass as its fuel.

== Future ==
In the Indian state of Odisha in the east of the country, at least 12 steel plants with a production capacity of 60 million tons per year will be built by 2030.

As per Assocham, around 40 MT of new steel capacity is to be commissioned in India by FY26.

The Kadapa Steel Plant, initiated by the Andhra Pradesh government in YSR Kadapa District, promises to boost job creation and economic growth. Launched in 2019 and now progressing under JSW Group’s phased development with sustainable technology, the project reflects the vision of YSRCP, led by Y.S. Jagan Mohan Reddy, to drive employment and industrial progress for Rayalaseema’s communities.

List of integrated steel plants proposed/under construction

Name	Location	Operator
Essar Paradeep steel plant	Paradeep	ArcelorMittal
AP High grades steel	Peddandlur, YSR Kadapa	YSR Steel Corporation
Lloyd's Metal Konsari Steel Plant	Konsari	Lloyd's Metal & Energy Ltd.
JSW Utkal Steel	Paradeep	JSW Steel
JSW Kadapa Steel	Sunnapurallapalli, YSR Kadapa	JSW Steel
SAIL Paradeep Steel Plant	Paradeep	SAIL
Jai Balaji Steels Purulia Ltd	Purulia, West Bengal	Jai Balaji Steels
NMDC Karnataka steel plant	Ballari, Karnataka	NMDC Steel Ltd.
Xindia Steels Karnataka plant	Hospete	Xindia Steels Ltd
MSP Metallics Odisha steel plant	Sambalpur	MSP Metallics
JSW BPSL Potka	Potka, Jharkhand	JSW BPSL

== Bibliography ==
- National Steel Policy, 2012
- Arnold, David (2004), The New Cambridge History of India: Science, Technology and Medicine in Colonial India, Cambridge University Press, ISBN 0-521-56319-4.
- Balasubramaniam, R. (2002), Delhi Iron Pillar: New Insights, Indian Institute of Advanced Studies, ISBN 81-7305-223-9.
- Bouri, Nisha. "Global Titans: Early Corporate Development in India's Steel Industry and the Legacy of British Imperialism" (PhD dissertation, Harvard University; ProQuest Dissertations Publishing, 2022. 28966826).
- CHAUDHURI, SAMIR. "THE GROWTH AND PROSPECTS OF THE IRON AND STEEL INDUSTRY IN THE ECONOMIC DEVELOPMENT OF INDIA" (PhD. Diss. American University, 1965; ProQuest Dissertations Publishing, 1965. 1300732).
- Gommans, Jos J. L. (2002), Mughal Warfare: Indian Frontiers and Highroads to Empire, 1500-1700, Routledge, ISBN 0-415-23989-3
- Rakesh Tewari, 2003, The origins of iron-working in India: new evidence from the Central Ganga Plain and the Eastern Vindhyas
- Srinivasan, S. & Ranganathan, S., Wootz Steel: An Advanced Material of the Ancient World, Indian Institute of Science.
