= Steel Consumers Council =

Indian government agency

- Emblem of India

Agency overview
- Jurisdiction: Republic of India
- Headquarters: Udyog Bhawan New Delhi
- Minister responsible: Ch. Birender Singh
- Agency executive: Minister of Steel
- Website: steel.nic.in

The Steel Consumers Council is a group under the Ministry of Steel, chaired by the Cabinet in charge of the department. India is the world's third-largest producer of crude steel, and the council works with steel producers to ensure both the supply and demand of the steel industry.[1][2][3] It also advises the Ministry of Steel and assists the Government of India on matters and policies concerning the Indian steel industry. In 2004, alarmed by the recent rise in steel prices, the Union Steel Ministry had proposed setting up of an independent regulator to monitor and fix the prices of steel. It had also supported a demand to abolish the present 5 per cent import duty on scrap this was announced by Ram Vilas Paswan Minister in charge of Ministry of Steel at the 18th national Steel consumers council in 2004.[4][5][6]

The council was founded in 1986. Its members are nominated by the Minister of Steel & Mines. The tenure of the council was initially fixed for two years, and it was re-constituted on 25 February 2010. The term of the present Council is up to 29 February 2012.

The largest steel producer in India is Steel Authority of India, a public sector company run by Government of India with an annual turnover of ₹50627 crore (US$7.6 billion) (FY 2014–15).

== Public Sector companies ==
- Steel Authority of India Limited (SAIL)
- Rashtriya Ispat Nigam Ltd. (RINL)
- National Mineral Development Corporation Ltd (NMDC)
- Kudremukh Iron Ore Company Ltd (KIOCL)
- MECON Limited
- Manganese Ore (India) Ltd (MOIL)
- MSTC Limited
- Hindustan Steel Works Construction Limited (HSCL)
- Sponge Iron India Limited (SIIL)
- Bharat Refractories Limited (BRL)
- Ferro Scrap Nigam Limited (FSNL)
- Bird Group of Companies

== Top steel companies of India in the Private sector ==
- Tata Steel
- JSW Steel
- VISA Steel
- Bhushan Steel
- Essar Steel

== Cabinet Ministers chairing the Steel Consumers Council ==
- Ashoke Kumar Sen - 1991
- Ram Vilas Paswan - 2004–2009
- Virbhadra Singh - 28 May 2009–18 Jan 2011
- Beni Prasad Verma - July 2011 – May 2014
- Narendra Singh Tomar -26 May 2014 – June 2016
- Chaudhary Birender Singh - 6 July 2016 – Present
