= Mariyammanahalli =

Mariyammanahalli Narayanadevarakere
- town
- Location in Karnataka, India
- Coordinates: 15.16°N 76.36°E
- Country: India
- State: Karnataka
- District: Vijayanagara
- Talukas: Hospet
- Elevation: 523 m (1,716 ft)

Population (2011)
  - Total: 15,940

Languages
  - Official: Kannada
- Time zone: UTC+5:30 (IST)
- PIN: 583222
- Telephone code: 08394
- ISO 3166 code: IN-KA
- Vehicle registration: KA 35
- Nearest city: Hospet
- Lok Sabha constituency: bellary
- Vidhan Sabha constituency: Hagaribommanahalli
- Climate: hot (Köppen)

Mariyammanahalli (formerly known as Sri Narayanadevarakere) is a town in the southern state of Karnataka, India. It is located in Vijayanagar (Hospet) Taluk, in the Vijayanagar district of Karnataka, south of Danapuram and east of Ankasamudra.

== Demographics ==
In 2011, there were 3,243 families in the village, with a total population of 15,940, of which 7,944 were males, and 7,996 were females.

The local language is Kannada.

== See also ==
- Hospet
- Bellary
- Districts of Karnataka
