= Ministry of Steel =

Government ministry of India

- Branch of Government of India

- Ministry of Steel

Agency overview
- Jurisdiction: Government of India
- Headquarters: Ministry of Steel; Udyog Bhawan; Dr. Maulana Azad Road; New Delhi,110011; New Delhi
- Annual budget: ₹70.15 crore (US$7.3 million) (2023-24 est.)
- Minister responsible: H.D. Kumaraswamy, Cabinet Minister
- Agency executive: Sandeep Pondrik, IAS, Steel Secretary
- Website: steel.gov.in

The Ministry of Steel is an executive branch agency of the Government of India that is responsible for formulating all policies regarding steel production, distribution and pricing in India. As of June 2024, the ministry is headed by a Secretary Rank IAS officer, who is its administrative head, while the political head is a minister of cabinet rank, H.D. Kumaraswamy, assisted by a Minister of State.

== Functions of the ministry ==
- Coordination of data from various sources for the growth of the iron and steel industry in India
- Formulation of policies in respect of production, pricing, distribution, import and export of iron and steel and ferroalloys
- Planning and development of and assistance to the entire iron and steel industry in the country
- Development of the input industries relating to iron ore, manganese ore, refractories and others required by the steel industry

== Attached/subordinate offices and institutes ==
- Joint Plant Committee (JPC)
  - A select organisation whose goal is the promotion of steel, coordinating work of the main producers
- National Institute of Secondary Steel Technology (NISST)
  - NISST aims to be a single source for all the requirements of the secondary steel sector
- Biju Patnaik National Steel Institute
  - Situated in Puri, BPNSI is an institute of modern steel technology. It provides education and training, research and development, and consultancy to the steel sector.

== Schemes and Programmes ==
- Bharat Steel
- National Metallurgist Award Scheme
- Steel Import Monitoring System (SIMS)

== Steel Consumers Council ==
The members of the Steel Consumers Council are nominated by the Minister of Steel. The tenure of the council was initially fixed for two years, and it was re-constituted on 25 February 2010. The term of the present council is up to 29 February 2012.

== Central Public Sector Undertakings ==
- Steel Authority of India Limited (SAIL)
- NMDC Limited
- Rashtriya Ispat Nigam Limited (RINL)
- KIOCL Limited
- MECON Limited
- Manganese Ore Limited (MOIL)
- Metal Scrap Trade Corporation Limited, New Delhi (MSTC)
- Sponge Iron India Limited (SIIL)
- Bird Group of Companies

== Cabinet Ministers ==
- Note: I/C – Independent Charge
- Key: ^{†} Died in office

Portrait	Minister (Birth-Death) Constituency	Term of office			Political party	Ministry	Prime Minister
Portrait	Minister (Birth-Death) Constituency	From	To	Period	Political party	Ministry	Prime Minister
Minister of Steel, Mines and Fuel
	Swaran Singh (1907–1994); MP for Jullundur	17 April 1957	10 April 1962	4 years, 358 days	Indian National Congress	Nehru III	Jawaharlal Nehru
Minister of Steel and Heavy Industries
	Chidambaram Subramaniam (1910–2000); MP for Pollachi	10 April 1962	21 November 1963	1 year, 225 days	Indian National Congress	Nehru IV	Jawaharlal Nehru
Minister of Steel, Mines and Heavy Engineering
	Chidambaram Subramaniam (1910–2000); MP for Pollachi	21 November 1963	9 June 1964	201 days	Indian National Congress	Nehru IV	Jawaharlal Nehru
	Chidambaram Subramaniam (1910–2000); MP for Pollachi	21 November 1963	9 June 1964	201 days	Indian National Congress	Nanda I	Gulzarilal Nanda
Minister of Steel and Mines
	Neelam Sanjiva Reddy (1913–1996); MP for Andhra Pradesh (Rajya Sabha)	9 June 1964	24 January 1966	1 year, 229 days	Indian National Congress	Shastri	Lal Bahadur Shastri
	Neelam Sanjiva Reddy (1913–1996); MP for Andhra Pradesh (Rajya Sabha)	9 June 1964	24 January 1966	1 year, 229 days	Indian National Congress	Nanda II	Gulzarilal Nanda
Minister of Iron and Steel
	Tribhuvan Narain Singh (1904–1982); MP for Uttar Pradesh (Rajya Sabha) (Minister of State)	29 January 1966	13 March 1967	1 year, 43 days	Indian National Congress	Indira I	Indira Gandhi
Minister of Steel, Mines and Metals
	Marri Chenna Reddy (1919–1996); MP for Andhra Pradesh (Rajya Sabha)	16 March 1967	24 April 1968	1 year, 39 days	Indian National Congress	Indira II	Indira Gandhi
	Prakash Chandra Sethi (1919–1996); MP for Indore (Minister of State)	24 April 1968	14 February 1969	296 days	Indian National Congress	Indira II	Indira Gandhi
Minister of Steel and Heavy Engineering
	C. M. Poonacha (1910–1990); MP for Mangalore	14 February 1969	15 November 1969	274 days	Indian National Congress	Indira II	Indira Gandhi
	Swaran Singh (1907–1994); MP for Jullundur	15 November 1969	27 June 1970	224 days	Indian National Congress (R)	Indira II	Indira Gandhi
	Bali Ram Bhagat (1922–2011); MP for Arrah	27 June 1970	18 March 1971	264 days	Indian National Congress (R)	Indira II	Indira Gandhi
	Mohan Kumaramangalam (1916–1973); MP for Pondicherry	18 March 1971	2 May 1971	45 days	Indian National Congress (R)	Indira III	Indira Gandhi
Minister of Steel and Mines
	Mohan Kumaramangalam (1916–1973); MP for Pondicherry	2 May 1971	31 May 1973^{[†]}	2 years, 29 days	Indian National Congress (R)	Indira III	Indira Gandhi
	Indira Gandhi (1917–1984); MP for Raebareli (Prime Minister)	31 May 1973	23 July 1973	53 days	Indian National Congress (R)	Indira III	Indira Gandhi
	T. A. Pai (1922–1981); MP for Karnataka (Rajya Sabha)	23 July 1973	11 January 1974	172 days	Indian National Congress (R)	Indira III	Indira Gandhi
	Keshav Dev Malviya (1904–1981); MP for Domariyaganj	11 January 1974	10 October 1974	272 days	Indian National Congress (R)	Indira III	Indira Gandhi
	Chandrajit Yadav (1930–2007); MP for Azamgarh (Minister of State)	10 October 1974	24 March 1977	2 years, 165 days	Indian National Congress (R)	Indira III	Indira Gandhi
	Biju Patnaik (1916–1997); MP for Aska	26 March 1977	15 July 1979	2 years, 111 days	Janata Party	Desai	Morarji Desai
	Morarji Desai (1896–1995); MP for Surat (Prime Minister)	16 July 1979	28 July 1979	12 days	Janata Party	Desai	Morarji Desai
Minister of Steel, Mines and Coal
	Biju Patnaik (1916–1997); MP for Aska	30 July 1979	14 January 1980	168 days	Janata Party (Secular)	Charan	Charan Singh
Minister of Steel and Mines
	Pranab Mukherjee (1935–2020); MP for West Bengal (Rajya Sabha), till 1981; MP for Gujarat (Rajya Sabha), from 1981	16 January 1980	15 January 1982	1 year, 364 days	Indian National Congress	Indira IV	Indira Gandhi
	N. D. Tiwari (1925–2018); MP for Nainital	15 January 1982	14 February 1983	1 year, 30 days	Indian National Congress	Indira IV	Indira Gandhi
	N. K. P. Salve (1921–2012); MP for Maharashtra (Rajya Sabha) (Minister of State, I/C)	14 February 1983	31 October 1984	1 year, 260 days	Indian National Congress	Indira IV	Indira Gandhi
	N. K. P. Salve (1921–2012); MP for Maharashtra (Rajya Sabha) (Minister of State, I/C)	31 October 1984	31 December 1984	1 year, 260 days	Indian National Congress	Rajiv I	Rajiv Gandhi
Minister of Steel, Mines and Coal
	Vasant Sathe (1925–2011); MP for Wardha	31 December 1984	25 September 1985	268 days	Indian National Congress	Rajiv II	Rajiv Gandhi
Minister of Steel and Mines
	K. C. Pant (1931–2012); MP for New Delhi	25 September 1985	12 April 1987	1 year, 199 days	Indian National Congress	Rajiv II	Rajiv Gandhi
	Vasant Sathe (1925–2011); MP for Wardha	12 April 1987	25 July 1987	104 days	Indian National Congress	Rajiv II	Rajiv Gandhi
	Makhan Lal Fotedar (1932–2017); MP for Uttar Pradesh (Rajya Sabha)	25 July 1987	2 December 1989	2 years, 130 days	Indian National Congress	Rajiv II	Rajiv Gandhi
	Dinesh Goswami (1935–1991); MP for Assam (Rajya Sabha)	6 December 1989	10 November 1990	339 days	Asom Gana Parishad	Vishwanath	V. P. Singh
	Ashoke Kumar Sen (1913–1996); MP for West Bengal (Rajya Sabha)	21 November 1990	21 June 1991	212 days	Samajwadi Janata Party (Rashtriya)	Chandra Shekhar	Chandra Shekhar
Minister of Steel
	Santosh Mohan Dev (1934–2017); MP for Silchar (Minister of State, I/C)	21 June 1991	16 May 1996	4 years, 330 days	Indian National Congress	Rao	P. V. Narasimha Rao
	Atal Bihari Vajpayee (1924–2018); MP for Lucknow (Prime Minister)	16 May 1996	1 June 1996	16 days	Bharatiya Janata Party	Vajpayee I	Self
	H. D. Deve Gowda (born 1933); Unelected (Prime Minister)	1 June 1996	29 June 1996	28 days	Janata Dal	Deve Gowda	H. D. Deve Gowda
Minister of Steel and Mines
	Birendra Prasad Baishya (born 1956); MP for Mangaldoi	29 June 1996	19 March 1998	1 year, 263 days	Asom Gana Parishad	Deve Gowda	H. D. Deve Gowda
	Birendra Prasad Baishya (born 1956); MP for Mangaldoi	29 June 1996	19 March 1998	1 year, 263 days	Asom Gana Parishad	Gujral	Inder Kumar Gujral
	Naveen Patnaik (born 1946); MP for Aska	19 March 1998	13 October 1999	1 year, 208 days	Biju Janata Dal	Vajpayee II	Atal Bihari Vajpayee
Minister of Steel
	Dilip Ray (born 1954); MP for Odisha (Rajya Sabha) (Minister of State, I/C)	13 October 1999	27 May 2000	227 days	Biju Janata Dal	Vajpayee III	Atal Bihari Vajpayee
	Braja Kishore Tripathy (born 1947); MP for Puri (Minister of State, I/C)	27 May 2000	22 May 2004	4 years, 0 days	Biju Janata Dal	Vajpayee III	Atal Bihari Vajpayee
	Ram Vilas Paswan (1946–2020); MP for Hajipur	23 May 2004	22 May 2009	4 years, 364 days	Lok Janshakti Party	Manmohan I	Manmohan Singh
	Virbhadra Singh (1934–2021); MP for Mandi	28 May 2009	19 January 2011	1 year, 236 days	Indian National Congress	Manmohan II	Manmohan Singh
	Beni Prasad Verma (1941–2020); MP for Gonda (Minister of State, I/C until 12 Jul 2011)	19 January 2011	26 May 2014	3 years, 127 days	Indian National Congress	Manmohan II	Manmohan Singh
	Narendra Singh Tomar (born 1957); MP for Gwalior	27 May 2014	5 July 2016	2 years, 40 days	Bharatiya Janata Party	Modi I	Narendra Modi
	Chaudhary Birender Singh (born 1946); MP for Haryana (Rajya Sabha)	5 July 2016	30 May 2019	2 years, 329 days	Bharatiya Janata Party	Modi I	Narendra Modi
	Dharmendra Pradhan (born 1969); MP for Madhya Pradesh (Rajya Sabha)	31 May 2019	7 July 2021	2 years, 37 days	Bharatiya Janata Party	Modi II	Narendra Modi
	Ramchandra Prasad Singh (born 1958); MP for Bihar (Rajya Sabha)	7 July 2021	6 July 2022	364 days	Janata Dal (United)	Modi II	Narendra Modi
	Jyotiraditya Scindia (born 1971); MP for Madhya Pradesh (Rajya Sabha)	6 July 2022	9 June 2024	1 year, 340 days	Bharatiya Janata Party	Modi II	Narendra Modi
	H.D. Kumaraswamy (born 1959); MP for Mandya	10 June 2024	Incumbent	2 years, 60 days	Janata Dal (Secular)	Modi III	Narendra Modi

== Ministers of State ==
Portrait	Minister (Birth-Death) Constituency	Term of office			Political party	Ministry	Prime Minister
Portrait	Minister (Birth-Death) Constituency	From	To	Period	Political party	Ministry	Prime Minister
Minister of State for Steel, Mines and Fuel
	Keshav Dev Malviya (1904–1981); MP for Domariyaganj; Minister of Mines and Oil from 25 Apr 1957	17 April 1957	10 April 1962	4 years, 358 days	Indian National Congress	Nehru III	Jawaharlal Nehru
Minister of State for Steel, Mines and Metals
	Prakash Chandra Sethi (1919–1996); MP for Indore	13 March 1967	24 April 1968	1 year, 42 days	Indian National Congress	Indira II	Indira Gandhi
Minister of State for Steel and Heavy Engineering
	K. C. Pant (1931–2012); MP for Nainital	14 February 1969	27 June 1970	1 year, 108 days	Indian National Congress (R)	Indira II	Indira Gandhi
Minister of State for Steel and Mines
	Shah Nawaz Khan (1914–1993); MP for Meerut	2 May 1971	5 February 1973	1 year, 279 days	Indian National Congress (R)	Indira III	Indira Gandhi
	Kariya Munda (born 1936); MP for Khunti	14 August 1977	28 July 1979	1 year, 348 days	Janata Party	Desai	Morarji Desai
Minister of State for Steel, Mines and Coal
	P. M. Sayeed (1941–2005); MP for Lakshadweep	4 August 1979	14 January 1980	163 days	Indian National Congress (Urs)	Charan	Charan Singh
	Kishore Chandra Deo (born 1947); MP for Parvathipuram	4 August 1979	14 January 1980	163 days	Indian National Congress (Urs)	Charan	Charan Singh
Minister of State for Steel and Mines
	Charanjit Chanana; MP for Delhi (Rajya Sabha)	15 January 1982	2 September 1982	230 days	Indian National Congress	Indira IV	Indira Gandhi
	Ram Dulari Sinha (1922–1994); MP for Sheohar	15 January 1982	14 February 1983	1 year, 30 days	Indian National Congress	Indira IV	Indira Gandhi
	Gargi Shankar Mishra (1919–1990); MP for Seoni	2 September 1982	6 September 1982	4 days	Indian National Congress	Indira IV	Indira Gandhi
Minister of State for Steel, Mines and Coal
	K. Natwar Singh (1929–2024); MP for Bharatpur; Minister of State, Steel	31 December 1984	25 September 1985	268 days	Indian National Congress	Rajiv II	Rajiv Gandhi
Minister of State for Steel and Mines
	Ram Dulari Sinha (1922–1994); MP for Sheohar; Minister of State, Mines	25 September 1985	14 February 1988	2 years, 142 days	Indian National Congress	Rajiv II	Rajiv Gandhi
	Ramanand Yadav (born 1927); MP for Bihar (Rajya Sabha); Minister of State, Mines	14 February 1988	12 April 1988	58 days	Indian National Congress	Rajiv II	Rajiv Gandhi
	Yogendra Makwana (born 1933); MP for Gujarat (Rajya Sabha)	14 February 1988	2 October 1988	231 days	Indian National Congress	Rajiv II	Rajiv Gandhi
	Mahaveer Prasad (1939–2010); MP for Bansgaon; Minister of State, Mines	4 July 1989	2 November 1989	121 days	Indian National Congress	Rajiv II	Rajiv Gandhi
	Basavaraj Patil Anwari (born 1943); MP for Koppal	21 November 1990	20 February 1991	91 days	Samajwadi Janata Party (Rashtriya)	Chandra Shekhar	Chandra Shekhar
Minister of State for Steel and Mines
	Ramesh Bais (born 1947); MP for Raipur	19 March 1998	13 October 1999	1 year, 208 days	Bharatiya Janata Party	Vajpayee II	Atal Bihari Vajpayee
Minister of State for Steel
	Akhilesh Das (1961–2017); MP for Uttar Pradesh (Rajya Sabha)	29 January 2006	6 April 2008	2 years, 68 days	Indian National Congress	Manmohan I	Manmohan Singh
	Jitin Prasada (born 1973); MP for Shahjahanpur	6 April 2008	22 May 2009	1 year, 46 days	Indian National Congress	Manmohan I	Manmohan Singh
	Sai Prathap Annayyagari (born 1944); MP for Rajampet	28 May 2009	19 January 2011	1 year, 236 days	Indian National Congress	Manmohan II	Manmohan Singh
	Vishnu Deo Sai (born 1964); MP for Raigarh	27 May 2014	30 May 2019	5 years, 3 days	Bharatiya Janata Party	Modi I	Narendra Modi
	Faggan Singh Kulaste (born 1959); MP for Mandla	31 May 2019	9 June 2024	5 years, 10 days	Bharatiya Janata Party	Modi II	Narendra Modi
	Bhupathi Raju Srinivasa Varma (born 1967); MP for Narasapuram	11 June 2024	Incumbent	2 years, 60 days	Bharatiya Janata Party	Modi III	Narendra Modi

== Deputy Ministers ==
No.	Portrait	Minister (Birth-Death) Constituency	Term of office			Political party	Ministry	Prime Minister
No.	Portrait	Minister (Birth-Death) Constituency	From	To	Period	Political party	Ministry	Prime Minister
Deputy Minister of Steel and Heavy Industries
1		Prakash Chandra Sethi (1919–1996); MP for Indore	8 June 1962	21 November 1963	1 year, 166 days	Indian National Congress	Nehru IV	Jawaharlal Nehru
Deputy Minister of Steel, Mines and Heavy Engineering
(1)		Prakash Chandra Sethi (1919–1996); MP for Indore	21 November 1963	27 May 1964	201 days	Indian National Congress	Nehru IV	Jawaharlal Nehru
(1)		Prakash Chandra Sethi (1919–1996); MP for Indore	27 May 1964	9 June 1964	201 days	Indian National Congress	Nanda I	Gulzarilal Nanda (Acting)
Deputy Minister of Steel and Mines
(1)		Prakash Chandra Sethi (1919–1996); MP for Indore	15 June 1964	11 January 1966	1 year, 223 days	Indian National Congress	Shastri	Lal Bahadur Shastri
(1)		Prakash Chandra Sethi (1919–1996); MP for Indore	11 January 1966	24 January 1966	1 year, 223 days	Indian National Congress	Nanda II	Gulzarilal Nanda (Acting)
Deputy Minister of Iron and Steel
(1)		Prakash Chandra Sethi (1919–1996); MP for Indore	29 January 1966	13 March 1967	1 year, 43 days	Indian National Congress	Indira I	Indira Gandhi
Deputy Minister of Steel, Mines and Metals
2		Ram Sewak Chowdhary (1927–2012); Rajya Sabha MP for Uttar Pradesh	13 November 1967	14 February 1969	1 year, 93 days	Indian National Congress	Indira I	Indira Gandhi
Deputy Minister of Steel and Heavy Engineering
3		Mohammad Shafi Qureshi (1928–2016); MP for Anantnag	14 February 1969	18 March 1971	2 years, 77 days	Indian National Congress	Indira I	Indira Gandhi
3		Mohammad Shafi Qureshi (1928–2016); MP for Anantnag	18 March 1971	2 May 1971	2 years, 77 days	Indian National Congress	Indira II	Indira Gandhi
Deputy Minister of Steel and Mines
4		Subodh Chandra Hansda (1927–2004); MP for Medinipur	5 February 1973	10 October 1974	1 year, 246 days	Indian National Congress	Indira II	Indira Gandhi
5		Sukhdev Prasad (1921–1995); Rajya Sabha MP for Uttar Pradesh}	5 February 1973	24 March 1977	4 years, 47 days	Indian National Congress	Indira II	Indira Gandhi
