= Indian steel =

Indian steel may refer to:

- Iron and steel industry in India
- Wootz steel, historic steel developed in India
