= Action group =

Action Group may refer to:

- Action group (sociology), or task group, a group of people joined temporarily to accomplish some task or take part in some organized collective action
- Action Group (Nigeria), a Nigerian political party established in Ibadan on March 21, 1951, by Chief Obafemi Awolowo
- Action (group theory), a way of describing symmetries of objects using groups
- Action Group (conglomerate), a business conglomerate based in India founded by Lala Mange Ram Agarwal
- Action Group (Malaysia), a business automotive aftermarket business founded in 1980 in Malaysia.
- Another name for a task group or military task force

== See also ==
- Group action (disambiguation)
