= Joint Plant Committee =

- Company type: (Central Govt. Organization); Public Sector Undertakings in India
- Industry: Steel
- Founded: 1964
- Headquarters: Kolkata, India
- Website: key_people = Shri Syedain Abbasi, Jt.Secretary, Ministry of Steel & Chairman, JPC

Constituted in 1964 by the Ministry of Steel, Government of India for formulating guidelines for production, allocation, pricing and distribution of iron and steel materials, Joint Plant Committee (JPC) underwent a major transformation in 1992, when following the de-regulation of Indian steel industry, it moulded itself into a facilitator for industry, focusing on giving form to a comprehensive and non-partisan databank – the first of its kind in the country – on the Indian iron and steel industry. Today, it is the only institution in the country, officially empowered by the Ministry of Steel, Government of India, to collect and report data on the Indian iron and steel industry. Accredited with ISO 9001: 2008 certification, JPC is headquartered at Kolkata with regional offices in New Delhi, Kolkata, Mumbai and Chennai and an extension centre in Bhubaneswar, engaged in data collection. The Economic Research Unit (ERU) at New Delhi serves as a wing of JPC to carry out techno-economic studies and policy analysis.

== Evolution of JPC ==
- 1964 – Constituted

JPC was constituted this year following the recommendations of the Dr. K.N. Raj Committee under Clause 17B of the Iron & Steel Control Order, 1956 of the Essential Commodities Act, 1955. Its objective is to plan, program, and determine regulatory production guidelines on iron and steel, including pricing and distribution.

- 1971 – Greater Empowerment

Vide Notification S.O. 1567/ECS.COMM/IRON &STEEL dated 7 April 1971, the Government specified in detail the Committee's composition and its various functions, thereby empowering JPC with precise directions to undertake its activities.

- 1992 – De-regulation of Steel Industry

Vide Notification No. SC/1/6/91/D.III dated 16 January 1992 and following the economic order of the day, the Indian steel industry was de-controlled, a milestone development that led to far-reaching changes in operational practices and overall spread of industry. In this changed scenario, JPC moulded itself to be a facilitator for the Indian steel industry, focusing on the maintenance of a comprehensive, non-partisan database on the industry – a first-time attempt to statistically enumerate industry growth.

- 2003 – Closure of Office of Development Commissioner of Iron &Steel (DCI&S)

In May 2003, the Office of DCI&S, engaged primarily in data collection work for the small and medium scale sector, was closed down. This led to the entrustment of the responsibility of collection and reporting of data on all segments in the small and medium scale sectors to JPC (which was focusing on the main producer till then) vide MoS Notification No. 13(13)30/2001-DI.

- 2007 – Deletion of Steel From EC Act, 1955

Vide notification No 26(1)/2004-ECR&E (Vol. III) dated 12 February 2007, Ministry of Consumer Affairs, Food and Public Distribution (Department of Consumer Affairs) announced the deletion of steel from the Essential Commodities Act and Such deletion wavered the very policy foundation of the organisation.

- 2008 – Notification of Ministry of Steel

Notification No. 4(5)/03-DI. dated 18 August 2008, issued by the Ministry of Steel pronounced the need for continuance of JPC in its present form, in the context of its critical database :

    "…the Central Government has decided that the said Joint Plant Committee shall continue to function in its present form along with its present composition and functions…"

- JPC Today

Backed by over 4 decades of specialised experience in data management, today JPC is the only organisation in the country, officially authorised by the Ministry of Steel, Government of India to collect and report on data on the Indian iron and steel industry. The JPC Database has emerged as the most trusted, comprehensive and non-partisan source of data and information on the Indian steel industry. JPC is also an ISO 9001:2008 organisation, indicating the quality of service rendered.
Headquarter of JPC is in Kolkata with regional offices in New Delhi, Kolkata, Mumbai, and Chennai, engaged in data collection and industry liaison. In 2014, JPC opened its extension centre in Bhubaneswar, Odisha, in a bid to consolidate and further sharpen the accuracy of its data and data collection system at the regional level. Two more Extension Offices are to be opened, one in Raipur and the other in Bangalore as approved in the 225th meeting of the JPC Apex Committee held on 11 March 2014.
The Economic Research Unit (ERU) at New Delhi serves as a wing of JPC, mainly responsible for the analysis of data collected by the JPC and for conducting specific studies/analysis entrusted to it by the Ministry of Steel. The ERU is headed by the Chief Economist.

== Structure and Composition of JPC ==
JPC is headed by Joint Secretary to Government of India, Ministry of Steel as its chairman and has representatives from SAIL, RINL, Tata Steel and Railway Board as its esteemed Members.

- Chairman: Jt.Secretary, Ministry of Steel
- Members: 7 Members in total(4 from SAIL, 1 each from Railway Board, Tata Steel and RINL)
- Executive Secretary is the administrative in-charge of the Organization.

== JPC Database and its Management ==
- JPC used its own classification system for statistical use only.

Category	Includes
Integrated Steel Producer(ISP)	SAIL plants, Vizag Steel/ RINL, Tata Steel Ltd, Essar Steel, JSW Steel, Jindal Steel & Power Ltd.
Other Producers	Other EAFs, All IFs, All Processors

- JPC Database coverage

Data Item	Coverage
Capacity, Production, Stocks & Inter Plant Transfer(IPT)	ISP, Others Crude Steel, Finished Steel, Pig iron & Sponge Iron
Imports and Exports	Finished Steel, Pig iron, Sponge Iron & Scrap
Prices	Open market, Producer prices, international and landed cost(selected items)
Consumption	Iron and Steel; Derived Data
Despatch	Iron and Steel; State wise
Raw Material	Iron ore, Pellet, Sinter, coal/coke, ferro-alloy, refractory, dolomite etc.
Accident in steel plants	Leading producers(ISPs)

- DATA Collection

Data	Source of Data
Capacity, Production, Stocks & Inter Plant Transfer(IPT	submission of production returns by units, on monthly basis, covering: North : 1004 units East : 885 units South : 649 units West : 1030 units
Imports, Exports	Daily download from FTP Server of Customs
Open market prices	Prices of 34 items – 1st and 15th of month
Producer prices	Monthly, from ISP plants
International prices	Monthly, compiled from Steel First

- Data Management Issues

Issue	Resolution
Validation	Production vis-a-vis Capacity/average production Minor discrepancy confirmed over phone / mail Nil returns confirmed for closure Input – output reconciliation
Non-Reporting	Either partial (estimation on basis of average production) or total (estimation on basis of state-wise capacity utilization)
Under-Reporting	mostly by small/medium units Estimation on basis of higher capacity utilization Neutralises any under reporting to a great extent
Double Counting	Doubly counted production of CR, GP/GC & pipes deducted from total production of steel

== JPC Publications ==
JPC Report	Highlights	Frequency
JPC Bulletin on Iron and Steel	Monthly trend scenario of domestic market in a global context. Published in both English and Hindi.	Monthly
Performance Review	Year-end performance review	Annual
Annual Statistics	Statistical compilation of 5-Yearly Performance	Annual
Survey Reports	Findings of segment surveys made by JPC	On completion of field survey

JPC Report	Publication Date
Flash Report	5th of every month
Indicative Market Price	5th/20th of every month
Import/Export statistics	10th of reference month
MIS Report	20th of every month
Performance Report	30th of every month
World Steel Association Report	22nd of every month
