= M. N. Dastur =

Indian engineer (1916 – 2004)

Minu Nariman Dastur
- Born: March 18, 1916
- Died: January 5, 2004 (aged 87); Kolkata, West Bengal India
- Education: Banaras Hindu University; Massachusetts Institute of Technology
- Children: 3
- Engineering career
- Discipline: Mechanical & Electrical
- Practice name: M N Dastur & Company Private Limited
- Employers: Tata Steel; H.A. Brassert & Company; Ramseyer and Miller Inc.
- Projects: Brassert direct reduction process

Minu Nariman Dastur (18 March 1916 – 5 January 2004) was an Indian mechanical and electrical engineer. His work included working with the government of India on the country's steel development plans. Dastur graduated from Banaras Hindu University with a degree in electrical & mechanical engineering in 1938 and initially worked for Tata Steel. He later moved to the United States and obtained a doctorate in metallurgy from Massachusetts Institute of Technology in 1948.

He founded M. N. Dastur & Company (P) Ltd in 1955 with head quarter in Kolkata India

== See also ==
- Iron and steel industry in India
- Visvesvaraya Iron and Steel Limited
