= Coal in India =

Coal production of India

Coal in India has been mined since 1774, and India is the second-largest producer and consumer of coal in the world after China, mining 1,047 million metric tons (1,154 million short tons) in FY 2024-25. India imports around 15% of the coal it consumes. Due to demand-supply mismatch and poor quality with high-ash content, India imports coking coal to meet the shortage of domestic supply. State-owned Coal India had a monopoly on coal mining between its nationalisation in 1973 and 2018.

Most coal is burned to generate electricity and most electricity is generated by coal, but coal-fired power plants have been criticised for breaking environmental laws. The health and environmental impact of the coal industry is serious, and phasing out coal would have short-term health and environmental benefits greatly exceeding the costs. Electricity from new solar farms in India is cheaper than that generated by the country's existing coal plants.

== History ==
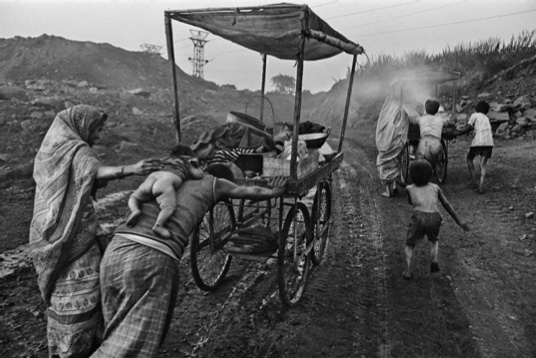
Coal mine, Dhanbad India

The Indira Gandhi administration of India nationalized coal mining in phases – coking coal mines in 1971–72 and non-coking coal mines in 1973. With the enactment of the Coal Mines (Nationalization) Act, 1973, all coal mines in India were nationalized in May 1973. This policy was reversed by the Narendra Modi administration four decades later. In March 2015, the government permitted private companies to mine coal for use in their own cement, steel, power or aluminium plants. The Coking Coal Mines (Nationalization) Act, 1972 and the Coal Mines (Nationalization) Act, 1973 were repealed in January 2018. In the final step toward denationalization, in February 2018, the government permitted private firms to enter the commercial coal mining industry. Under the new policy, mines were auctioned to the firm offering the highest per tonne price. The move broke the monopoly over commercial mining that state-owned Coal India had enjoyed since nationalisation in 1973.

=== Pre-independence ===
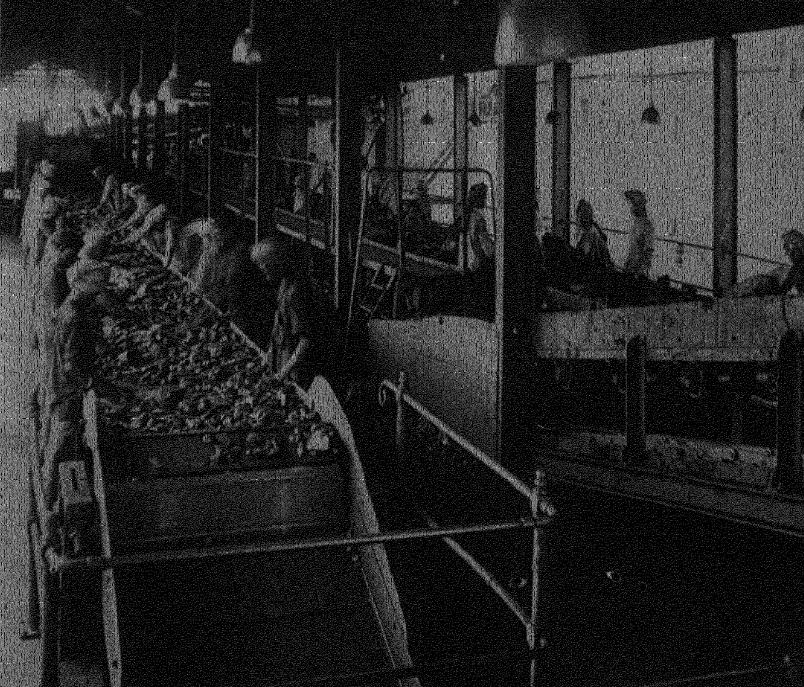
Singareni Coal Picking Belt in 1928

Commercial exploitation of coal in India began in 1774 with John Sumner and Suetonius Grant Heatly of the East India Company in the Raniganj Coalfield along the Western bank of Damodar River. The growth of Indian coal mining remained slow for nearly a century due to low demand. Carr, Tagore and Company tried to establish themselves as the sole supplier of coal in the region. In 1843, Jeremiah Homfray’s mine at Naraincoory was taken over by Carr, Tagore and Company to form Bengal Coal Company. The British authorities were not happy with the near monopoly of Carr, Tagore and Company in the field of coal mining. Bengal’s industrial development started taking off, powered by Bengal Coal Company’s coal. After the formation of Bengal Coal Company, the coal industry started getting regularised.The introduction of steam locomotives increased coal production to an annual average of 1 million metric tons (1.1 million short tons) in 1853. By 1900, India produced 6.12 million metric tons (6.75 million short tons) of coal per year; by 1920, it produced 18 million metric tons (20 million short tons). During the First World War, coal production received a boost due to increased demand, but declined again in the early 1930s. Production reached a level of 29 million metric tons (32 million short tons) by 1942 and 30 million metric tons (33 million short tons) by 1946.

In the regions of British India known as Bengal, Bihar and Odisha, the many Indians pioneered Indian involvement in coal mining from 1894. They broke the previous monopolies held by British and other Europeans, establishing many collieries at locations such as Khas Jharia, Jamadoba, Balihari, Tisra, Katrasgarh, Kailudih, Kusunda, Govindpur, Sijua, Sijhua, Loyabad, Dhansar, Bhuli, Bermo, Mugma, Chasnala-Bokaro, Bugatdih, Putki, Chirkunda, Bhowrah, Sinidih, Kendwadih, and Dumka.

Seth Khora Ramji Chawda of Kutch was the first Indian to break the British monopoly in the Jharia Coalfields. Natwarlal Devram Jethwa says that

The East Indian Railway in 1894–95 extended its line from Barakar to Dhanbad via Katras and Jharia. Messrs. Khora Ramji in 1894 was working on railway lines contract of Jharia branch line and with his brother Jetha Lira was also building Jharia Railway Station, when he discovered coal in Jharia belt. The location of his three collieries named Jeenagora, Khas Jherria, Gareria is mentioned also in 1917 Gazetteers of Bengal, Assam, Bihar and Odisha.

Other Indian communities followed the example of him in the Dhanbad-Jharia-Bokaro fields after the 1930s. These included the Punjabis, Kutchis, Marwaris, Gujaratis, Bengalis and Hindustanis.

=== Post-independence ===
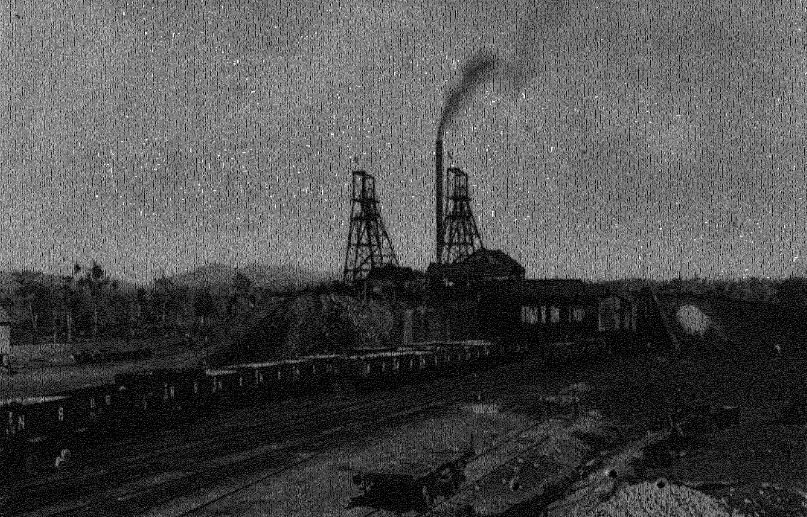
Singareni StruttPit in 1928

Following independence, the Government of India introduced several 5-year development plans. Annual production rose to 33 million metric tons (36 million short tons) at the beginning of the First Five Year Plan. The National Coal Development Corporation (NCDC), a Government of India Undertaking, was established in 1956 with the collieries owned by the railways. The NCDC aimed to increase coal production efficiently by systematic and scientific development of the coal industry. The Singareni Collieries Company Ltd. (SCCL) which was already in operation since 1945 and which became a Government company under the control of Government of Andhra Pradesh in 1956. The coal industry in India was thus controlled by state-owned companies in the 1950s. Today, SCCL is a joint undertaking of Government of Telangana and Government of India sharing its equity in 51:49 ratio.

=== Nationalisation of coal mines ===
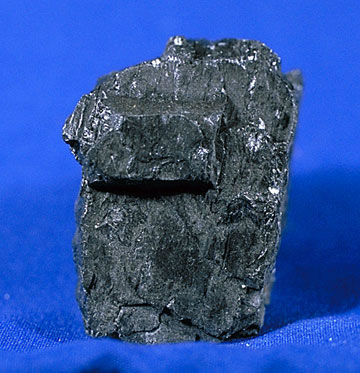
A piece of Coal

Right from its genesis, the commercial coal mining in modern times in India has been dictated by the needs of the domestic consumption. India has abundant domestic reserves of coal. Most of these are in the states of Jharkhand, Odisha, West Bengal, Bihar, Chhattisgarh, Telangana and Madhya Pradesh. On account of the growing needs of the steel industry, a thrust had to be given on systematic exploitation of coking coal reserves in Jharia coalfield. Adequate capital investment to meet the burgeoning energy needs of the country was not forthcoming from the private coal mine owners.

Unscientific mining practices adopted by some of them and poor working conditions of labor in some of the private coal mines became matters of concern for the Government. On account of these reasons, the Central Government took a decision to nationalize the private coal mines. The nationalization was done in two phases, the first with the coking coal mines in 1971–72 and then with the non-coking coal mines in 1973. In October 1971, the Coking Coal Mines (Emergency Provisions) Act, 1971 provided for taking over in public interest of the management of coking coal mines and coke oven plants pending nationalization. This was followed by the Coking Coal Mines (Nationalization) Act, 1972 under which the coking coal mines and the coke oven plants other than those with the Tata Iron & Steel Company Limited and Indian Iron & Steel Company Limited, were nationalized on 1 May 1972 and brought under the Bharat Coking Coal Limited (BCCL), a new Central Government Undertaking. Another enactment, namely the Coal Mines (Taking Over of Management) Act, 1973, extended the right of the Government of India to take over the management of the coking and non-coking coal mines in seven States including the coking coal mines taken over in 1971. This was followed by the nationalization of all these mines on 1 May 1973 with the enactment of the Coal Mines (Nationalization) Act, 1973 which determined the eligibility of coal mining in India.

All non-coking coal mines were nationalized in 1973 and placed under Coal Mines Authority of India. In 1975, Eastern Coalfields Limited, a subsidiary of Coal India Limited, was formed. It took over all the earlier private collieries in Raniganj Coalfield. Raniganj Coalfield covers an area of 443.50 square kilometres (171.24 sq mi) and has total coal reserves of 8,552.85 million metric tons (9,427.90 million short tons). Eastern Coalfields puts the reserves at 29.72 billion metric tons (32.76 billion short tons) which makes it the second largest coalfield in the country (in terms of reserves).

The North East Indian states enjoys special privileges under constitution of India. The Sixth Schedule of constitution and article 371 of constitution allows state governments to formulate its own policy to recognize customary tribal laws. For example, Nagaland has its own coal policy which allows its natives to mine coal from their respective lands. Similarly, coal mining in Meghalaya was rampant till imposition of ban on coal mining by National Green Tribunal. The Nagaland Coal and Meghalaya Coal has large buyers in North India, Central India and Eastern India.

=== Denationalisation of coal mines ===
Parliament enacted the Coal Mines (Special Provisions) Act, 2015 in March 2015 containing provisions enabling the government to allocate coal mines through auctions. The law also permitted private players to mine coal for use in their own cement, steel, power or aluminium plants. On 20 February 2018, the Cabinet Committee on Economic Affairs (CCEA) permitted private firms to enter the commercial coal mining industry in India. Under the new policy, mines will be auctioned to the firm offering the highest per tonne price. The move broke the monopoly over commercial mining that state-owned Coal India has enjoyed since nationalisation in 1973.

The Coking Coal Mines (Nationalization) Act, 1972 and the Coal Mines (Nationalization) Act, 1973 were repealed by the Repealing and Amending (Second) Act, 2017 on 8 January 2018.

== Reserves ==
India has the fourth largest coal reserves in the world. As of 1 April 2021, India had 352.13 billion metric tons (388.16 billion short tons) of the resource. The total reserves of coal rose 2.36% over the previous year, with the discovery of an estimated 8.11 billion metric tons (8.94 billion short tons). About half of India's coal reserves are proven, 42% are indicated/probable, and 8% are inferred. Coal deposits are primarily found in eastern and south-central India. Jharkhand, Odisha, and Chhattisgarh accounted for almost 70% of the total known coal reserves in India.

The estimated total reserves of lignite coal as of 1 April 2021 were 46.02 billion metric tons (50.73 billion short tons), remaining unchanged from the previous year. The largest lignite reserves are present in Tamil Nadu. Only about 16% of India's lignite reserves are proven, 56% are indicated/probable, and 28% are inferred.

The energy derived from coal in India is about twice that of the energy derived from oil, whereas worldwide, energy derived from coal is about 30% less than energy derived from oil.

=== Distribution of coal reserves by states ===
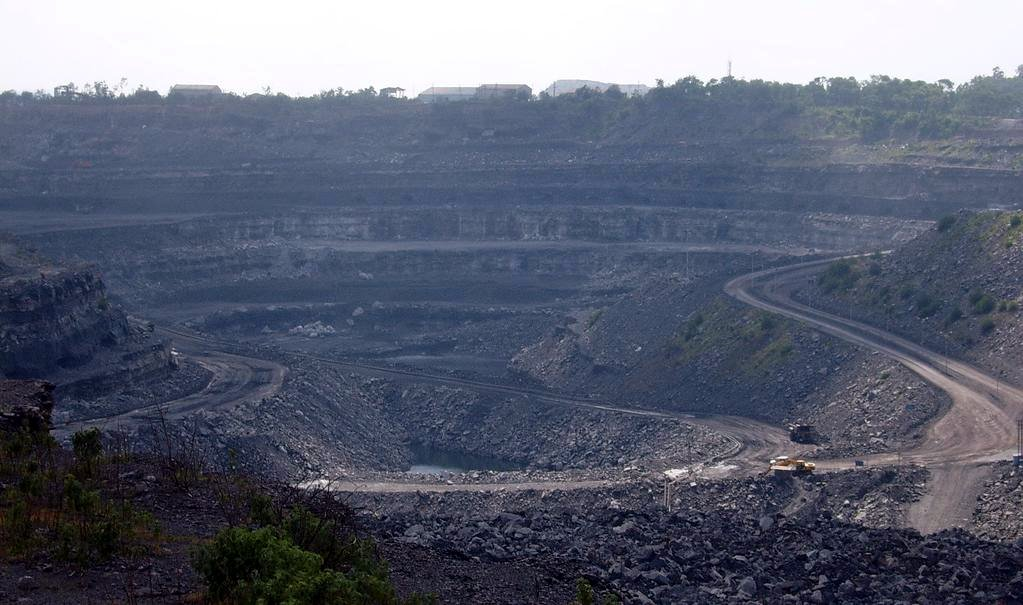
The Dhanbad mine complex.

The following table shows the estimated coal reserves in India by state as of 1 April 2021.

State	Coal reserves (in billion metric tonnes)	Type of coalfield
Jharkhand	86.217	Gondwana
Odisha	84.878	Gondwana
Chhattisgarh	73.424	Gondwana
West Bengal	33.092	Gondwana
Madhya Pradesh	30.217	Gondwana
Telangana	22.851	Gondwana
Maharashtra	12.936	Gondwana
Bihar	3.464	Gondwana
Andhra Pradesh	2.247	Gondwana
Uttar Pradesh	1.062	Gondwana
Meghalaya	0.576	Tertiary
Assam	0.525	Tertiary
Nagaland	0.446	Tertiary
Sikkim	0.101	Gondwana
Arunachal Pradesh	0.09	Tertiary
India	352.13	

=== Distribution of lignite reserves by states ===
The following table shows the estimated lignite reserves in India by state as of 1 April 2021.

State	Coal reserves (in billion metric tonnes)
Tamil Nadu	36.490
Rajasthan	6.349
Gujarat	2.722
Puducherry	0.417
Jammu and Kashmir	0.028
Kerala	0.01
West Bengal	0.004
India	46.02

== Production ==
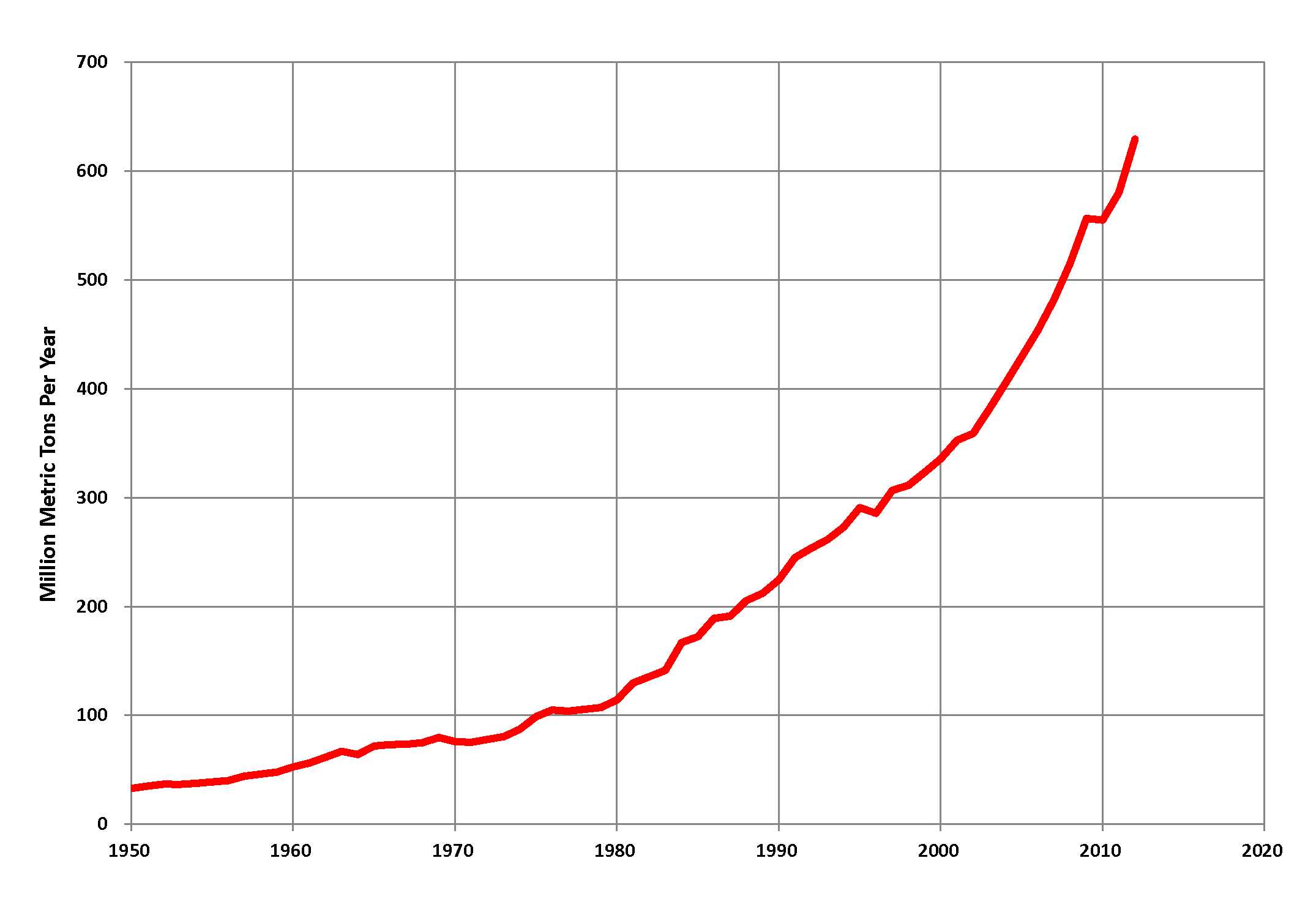
Coal production in India, 1950–2012

India is the second largest producer of coal in the world, after China. The production of coal was 1,000 million metric tons (1,100 million short tons) in 2024 and 716.08 million metric tons (789.34 million short tons) in 2020–21, a decline of 2.02% over the previous year primarily due to disruptions caused by the COVID-19 pandemic. The production of lignite was 36.61 million metric tons (40.36 million short tons) in 2020–21, a decrease of 13.04% over the previous fiscal. Production of coal grew by a compound annual growth rate (CAGR) of 3.19%, and production of lignite declined by a CAGR of 1.60% over the last 10 years. Coal mining is one of India's most dangerous jobs.

India targets to increase its coal production to 1,200 million metric tons (1,300 million short tons) by 2023–24.

=== Washing ===
Coal washing is an integral part of the coal production process in which raw coal from mines is washed to remove the ash content to make it fit for feeding into boilers such as those in steel plants. Coal washeries are generally not a part of coal mines in India, with some exceptions.

There were 60 coal washeries (19 coking and 41 non-coking) in India as on 31 March 2021 with a total installed capacity of 138.58 million tonnes per year, of which 108.60 million tonnes are non-coking and 29.98 million tonnes are coking coal washeries.

== Consumption ==
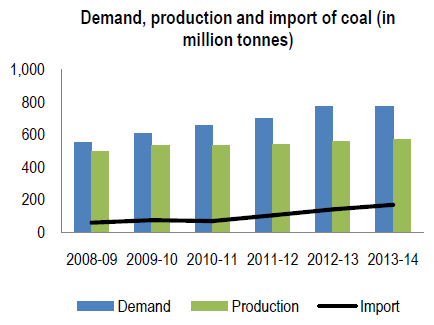
Demand, production and import of coal (in million tonnes)

India is one of the largest consumers of coal in the world. The country consumed 906.08 million metric tons (0.99878 billion short tons) of coal in 2020–21, of which 79.03% was produced domestically. Coal consumption grew at a compound annual growth rate of 3.96% over the previous decade. Due to high demand and poor average quality, India is forced to import high quality coal to meet the requirements of steel plants. India imported 215.25 million metric tons (237.27 million short tons) and exported 2.95 million metric tons (3.25 million short tons) of coal in 2020–21. Net imports of coal declined by 13.39% over the previous fiscal. India's net imports of coal grew at a compound annual growth rate of 8.62% over the last 10 years. India is the second largest coal importer in the world, after China.

The electricity sector is the largest consumer of raw coal in India and accounted for 64.07% of the total coal consumed in the country in 2020–21. Other significant consumers include the steel and washery industry (6.65%), the sponge iron industry (1.06%), the cement industry (0.75%), and fertilizers and chemicals (0.19%).

Consumption of lignite stood at 37.22 million metric tons (0.04103 billion short tons) in 2020–21. Electricity generation alone accounts for 84.46% of the total lignite consumption. Other significant consumers include the paper industry (5.55%), the cement industry (2.18%) and the textile industry (2.01%). Lignite consumption declined at a compound annual growth rate of 1.30% over the previous decade.

=== Electricity generation ===
Coal generated over 73% of electricity produced in 2020–21, while lignite accounted for 3.6% of electricity generation. India's electricity sector consumed over 70% of the coal produced in the country in 2013. In 2020 think tank Carbon Tracker estimated that 17% of coal-fired plants were already more expensive than new renewables and that 85% would be by 2025. It has been suggested that no new coal plants are needed, but that existing plants could be retrofitted to operate more flexibly together with wind and solar.

A large part of Indian coal reserve is similar to Gondwana coal. It is of low calorific value and high ash content. The carbon content is low in India's coal, and toxic trace element concentrations are negligible. The natural fuel value of Indian coal is poor. On average, the Indian power plants using India's coal supply consume about 0.7 kg of coal to generate a kWh, whereas United States thermal power plants consume about 0.45 kg of coal per kWh. This is because of the difference in the quality of the coal, as measured by the Gross Calorific Value (GCV). On average, Indian coal has a GCV of about 4500 Kcal/kg, whereas the quality in most other countries is much better; for example, in Australia, the GCV is 6500 Kcal/kg approximately.

=== Coal gasification ===
Gasification of Char/Coal

Gasification of coal or lignite or pet coke or biomass produces synthesis gas or syngas (also known as coal gas or wood gas) which is a mixture of hydrogen, carbon monoxide and carbon dioxide gases. Coal gas can be converted into synthetic natural gas by using the Fischer–Tropsch process at high pressure and medium temperature. Coal gas can also be produced by underground coal gasification if the coal deposits are located deep in the ground or it is uneconomical to mine the coal. Synthetic natural gas production technologies promise to dramatically improve India's supply of natural gas. The Dankuni coal complex produces syngas that is piped to industrial users in Calcutta. Many coal-based fertiliser plants can also be economically retrofitted to produce synthetic natural gas. It is estimated that the production cost for syngas could be below US$6 per million British thermal units ($20/MWh). The abundantly available coal in India is low rank coal which is not suitable for coal gasification without blending with pet coke. However, low rank coal/lignite can be converted into SNG by using hydrogen.

== Health and environmental impacts ==
The health and environmental impact of the coal industry is serious in India. One study found that 90% of households surveyed in a village near a coal mine reported health problems in the last year, compared to 52% of households from villages at least 40 km (25 mi) away from a mine. Additionally, the villages closest to the mine had the greatest incidence of self-reported health problems. Health effects of coal ash are also a problem. Air pollution from coal-fired power plants is linked with asthma, cancer, heart and lung ailments, neurological problems, acid rain, global warming, and other severe environmental and public health impacts.

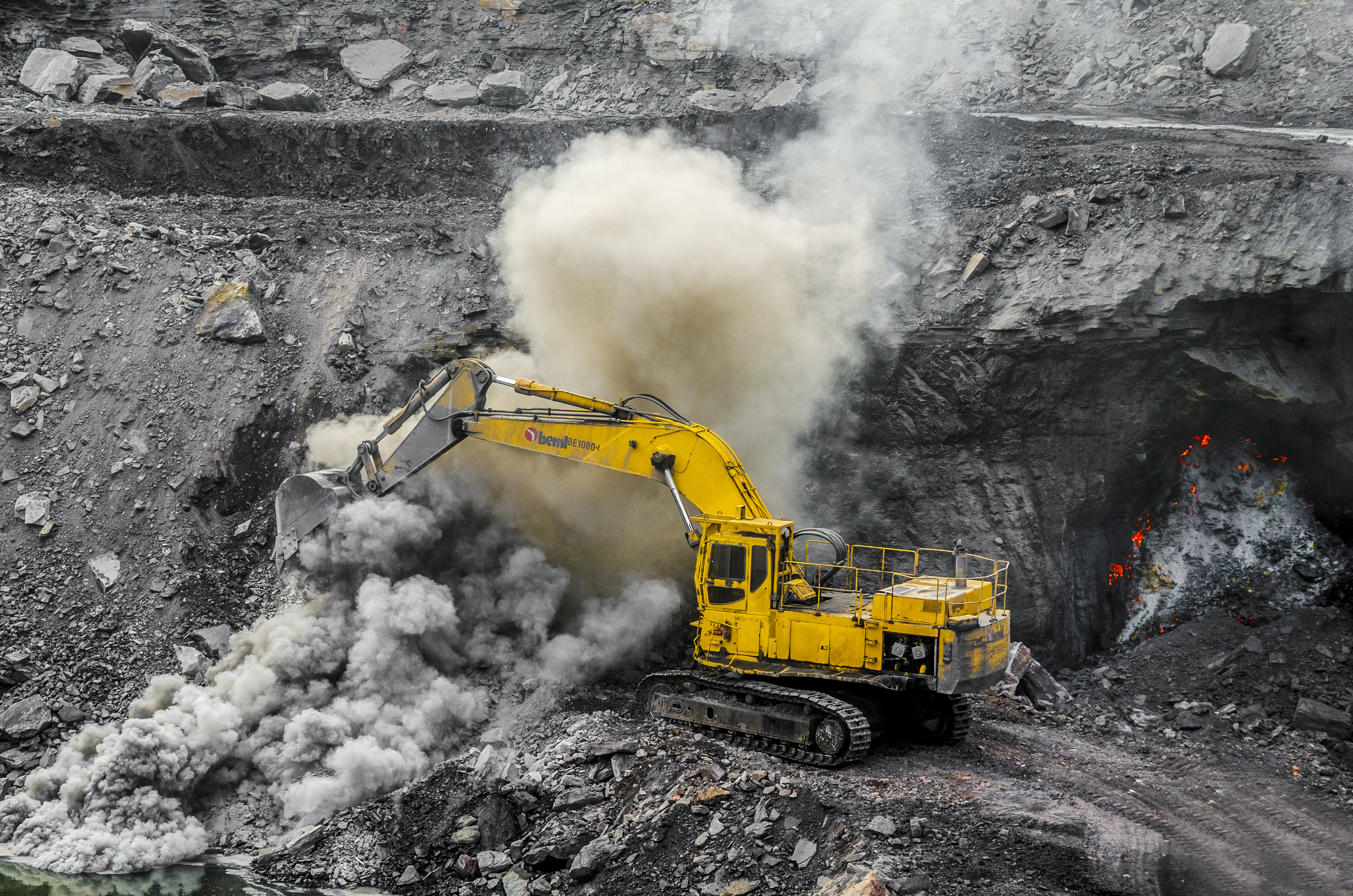
Jharia Coalfield with smoke and burning embers coming from the underground coal field fire. The fire has burned for nearly a century and displaced or endangered the health of 100s of thousands of people.

Health damages are mainly led by particulate matter, including sulfur dioxide (SO2) and nitrogen dioxide (NO2) emitted from coal plants.

The Centre for Science and Environment has assessed the Indian coal-based power sector as one of the most resource-wasteful and polluting sectors in the world, in part due to the high ash content in India's coal. India's Ministry of Environment and Forests has therefore mandated the use of coals whose ash content has been reduced to 34% (or lower) in power plants in urban, ecologically sensitive and other critically polluted areas.

In 2020 UN secretary general António Guterres said that India should stop building coal-fired power stations before the end of the year and end fossil fuel subsidies. According to BloombergNEF excluding subsidies the levelized cost of electricity from new large-scale solar power has been below existing coal-fired power stations since 2021.

Before a thermal power plant is approved for construction and commissioning in India it must undergo an extensive review process that includes environmental impact assessment. The Ministry of Environment and Forests has produced a technical guidance manual to help project proposers avoid environmental pollution from thermal power plants. As of 2016, the existing coal-fired power stations in the utility and captive power sectors were estimated to require nearly 12.5 million INR per MW capacity to install pollution control equipment to comply with the latest emission norms set out by the Ministry of Environment and Forests. Most of the coal fired stations have not complied installation of flue gas de-sulphurisation units for reducing the pollution. In April 2020, CPCB declared that over 42,000 MW thermal power plants have outlived their lives. India has also banned imports of pet coke for use as fuel. As a signatory to the Paris Agreement, India is also reducing power generation from coal to control the emission of greenhouse gases. The particulate, NO_{x} and SO_{x} emissions (excluding particulate emissions in the form of drift from wet cooling towers and mercury emissions from the flue stacks) of coal-, oil- and gas-fired power stations in utility power sector (excluding captive power plants) are monitored regularly.

In 2021, the majority of CO_{2} emissions from power generation in India were produced by coal, accounting for 96.7% of the total. Natural gas was responsible for 2.6% of emissions, while oil contributed 0.5%.

India's thermal power plants are inefficient and replacing them with cheaper renewable technologies offers significant potential for greenhouse gas (CO_{2}) emission reduction. They emit 50% to 120% more CO_{2} per kWh produced compared to average emissions from their European Union (EU-27) counterparts.

The central government plans to retire coal-based plants that are at least 25 years old and contributing excessive pollution, totalling 11,000 MW of capacity. As of 2018 there is no similar retirement plan for the captive power sector. In 2020 Carbon Tracker estimated that phasing out 20 years or more old coal-fired plants and the coal-fired plants under construction with electricity sale price exceeding INR 4/kWh with new renewables is more economical as these coal-fired plants are imposing heavy financial burden on Discoms.

== Coal mafia ==
The state-owned coal mines of Bihar (now Jharkhand after the division of Bihar state) were among the first areas in India to see the emergence of a sophisticated mafia, beginning with the mining town of Dhanbad. It is alleged that the coal industry's trade union leadership forms the upper echelon of this arrangement and employs caste allegiances to maintain its power. Pilferage and sale of coal on the black market, inflated or fictitious supply expenses, falsified worker contracts and the expropriation and leasing-out of government land have allegedly become routine. A parallel economy has developed with a significant fraction of the local population employed by the mafia in manually transporting the stolen coal for long distances over unpaved roads to illegal mafia warehouses and points of sale.

The coal mafia has had a negative effect on Indian industry, with coal supplies and quality varying erratically. Higher-quality coal is sometimes selectively diverted, and missing coal is replaced with stones and boulders in railway cargo wagons. A human corpse has been discovered in a sealed coal wagon.

== Future plans ==
Under the government's 2023-2027 National Electricity Plan, India will not build any new fossil fuel power plants in the utility sector, aside from those currently under construction. It is expected that non-fossil fuel generation contribution is likely to reach around 44.7% of the total gross electricity generation by 2029–30.

India has committed to install 275,000 MW of renewable energy capacity by 2027. The existing base load coal and gas based power plants need to be flexible enough to accommodate the variable renewable energy. Also ramping up, ramping down, warm start up, hot start up capabilities of existing coal based power stations are critical to accommodate the frequent variations in renewable power generation. It is also examined to use the retired coal based electric generators as synchronous condensers for improving the grid inertia when it is dominated by static power generation sources like solar and wind power.

== See also ==
- India's Coal Story – a 2017 book by Subhomoy Bhattacharjeeon on coal in India
- Ministry of Coal
- Indian Coal Allocation Scam
- 1965 Dhanbad coal mine disaster
- Mining scams in India
- Carr, Tagore and Company
