= Group action (disambiguation) =

Group action may refer to:

- Group action (mathematics)
- Group action (sociology)

== See also ==
- Action group (disambiguation)
- Class action, a type of lawsuit
- Collective action, action taken by a group to achieve a common objective
