= India's Coal Story =

Indian non-fictional book

India's Coal Story: From Damodar to Zambezi
- Cover of the book
- Author: Subhomoy Bhattacharjee
- Language: Indian English
- Genre: Non-fiction
- Publication date: 3 April 2017
- Publication place: India
- ISBN: 9789386446015

India's Coal Story: From Damodar to Zambezi is a non-fiction book written by journalist Subhomoy Bhattacharjee and published by SAGE Publishing in 2017. The book is about India's coal history, energy sector, and economy. It has received an overall good reception from book reviewers and critics.

== Synopsis ==
The book has 9 chapters and 264 pages. First chapter of the book is Ole King Coal which contains introduction to India's mining history and how coal mining was started. It mentions about Raniganj, city on the bank of Damodar River, where coal mining happened en large and it mentions about Zambezi, river in the Africa, from where India has imported the coal.

A Nation And Its Contradictions, second chapter of the book, is about the business of opium, establishment of Carr, Tagore and Company, politics behind then coal mining, role of East India Company and the history of coal mining amid world-wars and recession of 1929. Nationalisation of problems, third chapter, mentions Bombay Plan, Nehruvian socialism and take over of the industries, Indira Gandhi's rule and price control, and problems faced by India businessmen after independence of India.

== Reception ==
Indian economist Omkar Goswami, over an article of The Indian Express, labeled the book as "sound reference guide". He wrote that author weaves a series of fascinating stories about India’s coal history but it doesn’t quite hold as a cohesive narrative. He also wrote that book consists good amount of informative nuggets which could have made it as great book if it was used well.

Navroz K Dubhash, in a book review in Business Standard, has praised the work and wrote "book gives us solid platform for understanding India's long-standing tryst with call". Additionally, he wrote that book is comprehensive and rich in detail.

Richa Mishra, writing for Business Line, has called the book as "heavy on facts with a play-it-safe approach". She wrote that book has an interesting compilation of facts and author did a "neat balancing act to his credit". Indrani Dutta in The Hindu has praised the work, but pointed out a few factual inaccuracies. She wrote that book is no creative work but a painstaking research done by author through series of interviews and tours across India.

K Yatish Rajawat, writing for The Financial Express, wrote that book represents the research about subject without being didactic and dense. He also added that author created a wonderful narrative using stories of the Damodar and Zambezi rivers. However, he showed disappointment that book perpetuates that public sector is inefficient which is myth according to him. Marathi daily Loksatta wrote that the book should be read to know history of India's coal sector and different intervals of it.

== See also ==
- Coal mining in India
