= Nagarnar Steel Plant =

Indian steel manufacturer

Coordinates: 19°5′29.76″N 82°9′57.24″E

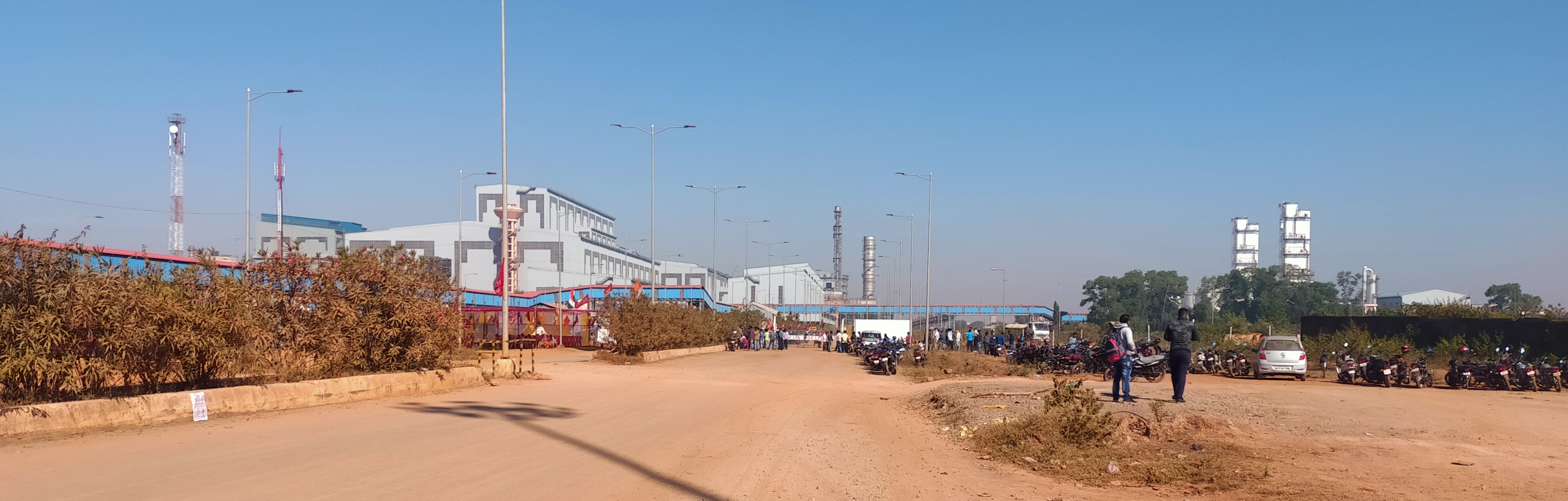
- Trade name: NMDC Steel
- Company type: Public
- Traded as: NSE: NSLNISP; BSE: 543768
- ISIN: INE0NNS01018
- Industry: Steel
- Predecessor: NMDC
- Founded: 2021
- Products: IS 5986 HR Plates & sheets IS 1079 HR Coils General Engineering steels IS 6240 - 5L quality plates and coils IS 3196 LPG Cylinders; High Carbon Steel; Silicon steel
- Website: nmdcsteel.nmdc.co.in

NMDC Steel Limited was formed under Government of India under Ministry of Steel with the help of NMDC's resources for setting up a 3 MTPA capacity greenfield Integrated Steel Plant based on Hi-Smelt technology in Nagarnar, located 16 km from Jagdalpur in Chhattisgarh state with an estimated outlay of Rs. 25500 crore. A pure-play miner, NMDC had in 2009-10 conceived the Nagarnar steel plant with the intention of moving up the value chain and diversifying its portfolio. The idea was also to hedge itself against the vagaries of iron ore prices. This is the only new large-scale steel plant currently fully ready to start production India, with little likelihood of a new plant of similar size plant coming up in the next few years. Tata Steel and JSW Steel are expanding capacity at their existing mills.

NMDC Steel Limited (NSL) was listed at the Bombay Stock Exchange on 20th Feb 2023. NMDC Steel Limited (NSL) is NMDC’s 3 MTPA integrated steel plant at Nagarnar in Chhattisgarh.The now demerged company NMDC Steel Limited is a central public sector enterprise with a paid-up capital of Rs. 2,930 crores owned by the Government of India, under the administrative control of the Ministry of Steel. The Government owns 60.79% stake in this company.

== Location ==
The plant site is around 16 km from Jagdalpur and 6 km from the Orissa–Chhattisgarh border. The nearest railway station is Amaguda (around 2 km). The site is located on National Highway NH 30. The nearby airports are Jagdalpur, Jeypore, Raipur & Visakhapatnam and the nearest seaport is Visakhapatnam located at a distance of approx 325 km. The nearest river is Indravati, located at a distance of 3 km.

== Consultants ==
Ministry of steel has engaged MECON under a contract dated 23 February 2011 for Engineering, Design and Consultancy services for upcoming Steel Plant Nagarnar. As a part of the above, MECON is providing Procurement Services, Basic Engineering Services, Detailed Engineering Services, Designer’s Supervision Services, Inspection Services, Assistance in Commissioning Services and other General Services. Thin Slab Caster & Inline Hot Strip Mill at NMDC were built by Shapoorji Pallonji Group

== Project Facilities ==
The entire plant is installed in less than 1,800 acres of land and has the following major facilities:

Facilities	Details
Coke Oven & By Product Complex	7 m Tall Batteries, 2 Nos.
Steel Melting Shop (SMS)	2 x175 T BOF Converters
Blast furnace complex	4,506 cum
Sinter Plant	460 sqm, 1 No.
Pig Casting Machine	1700 tpd, 3 machines
Basic Oxygen furnace	2 x 175 t
Ladle furnace	2 x 175 t
RH-OB	1 x 175 t
Gas based Power Plant	2 x 40 MW
Thin Slab caster	2 Strand CC and HSM 2RM+4FM+2 Down Coiler
Hot strip finishing train	6 strands
Lime & Dolo Plant	2 x 500 t/d & 1 x 300 t/d
Oxygen plant	2 x 1250 t/d

== Project Status ==
The estimated time period for completing the project was about four years which is already overrun by four and half years, as of November 2022. Construction work for the project have been completed.

It is planned to roll out the first HR coils from the plant from July 2023. As a precursor to commissioning of the Coke Oven Battery power has been switched on for the coal handling system including the stacker reclaimer to start commissioning of the coal route of Raw Materials Handling System. The 220KV GIS (Gas Insulated Switch) main receiving sub-station was started in March 2018, followed by power supply to the Sinter Plant.

The power sub-station packages that will be activated subsequently are the Raw Material Handling Plant, Coke Oven, Blast Furnace, Steel Melting Shop, Hot Strip Mill, Lime & Dolomite Calcination Plant and Railway Yard.

== Iron Ore ==
Ministry of steel has proposed to use mine lease area at Deposit 4 located at Bailadila range of hills at Bhansi near Bacheli in South Bastar’s Dantewada district in Chhattisgarh for meeting the raw material requirement 'exclusively' for the Integrated Steel Plant at Nagarnar. The Deposit 4 iron ore mine is proposed to be developed as a 'standalone project' with an estimated investment of Rs 1899.74 crores. The exploration work was done at Bailadila Deposit 4 by NMDC during 1972-74. The ore reserves were proved by detailed exploration activities.

Iron ore requirement for the steel plant would be 5 MTPA. The Deposit 4, spread over a mining lease area of 646.596 hectares, has a production capacity of 7.0 MTPA. The remaining iron ore quantity after meeting the requirement of the Nagarnar plant will be sold to domestic customers in Chhattisgarh.

In addition to the mining lease area, 95.13 hectares forest land is identified for development of infrastructure such as the downhill conveyor, screening plant, loading plant and approach road etc. Further, 50 hectares of non-forest land is also required for installation of railway stockyard, administrative building, loading plant (part), tailing dam, STP, and township etc.

Mining plan along with progressive mine closure plan has been approved by Indian Bureau of Mines (IBM), for a production capacity of 7.0 MTPA vide their letter no: No 314(3)/2012-MCCM (CZ)/MP-19 dated 26 July 2013.

NMDC is operating iron ore mines at Bailadila Complex in South Bastar Dantewada District Chhattisgarh and has long-term commitment to supply iron ore to major steel plants across the country from existing mines. Hence, a JV Company between NMDC and Chhattisgarh Mineral Development Corporation (CMDC) was formed for the development of a new deposit in the already prospected areas i.e Bailadila Deposit-4 with a production capacity of 7 MTPA for meeting the iron ore requirement of Nagarnar Steel plant.

== Pellet Plant & Slurry Pipe Line ==
The 15 MTPA Slurry Pipeline System from Bailadila to Nagarnar and a 2 MTPA Pellet Plant at Nagarnar are being implemented by NMDC. This section of pipeline would be used for transporting iron ore fines from Bailadila to Nagarnar for pelletisation.

This pipeline is planned for further extension from Nagarnar to Visakhapatnam which will be implemented by a JV company of NMDC, Rashtriya Ispat Nigam Ltd (RINL) and Kudremukh Iron Ore Company (KIOCL).

== Arrangement for Power ==
The steel plant has a total power requirement of 296 MW out of which NMDC proposes to take 241 MW from the grid through Chhattisgarh State Power Transmission Company Limited (CSPTCL) and the remaining power be generated in-house.

Thermax was selected by National Mineral Development Corporation in year 2012 under a Rs 503-crore contract to set up the captive power plant for the integrated steel plant. Thermax will be responsible to design, engineer, construct and commission the captive plant on a turnkey basis. The supply of equipment includes three 160 tonne per hour capacity boilers that use multiple fuels – blast furnace and coke oven gas from the steel process and light diesel oil – and two 40 MW each steam turbines. Steam from the boilers will be used to blow air into the blast furnace and to generate 80 MW power.

== Railway Facilities ==
The Railway Siding Project is being implemented by IRCON to bring raw material such as iron ore, coking coal, limestone and dolomite, etc. for production and for outward movement of finished steel and slag. Phase I of the project envisages connecting the 6-km stretch from the KK Railway line with Nagarnar Steel Plant at Ambagaon and Amaguda by laying about 53 km of railway line within the steel plant premises at a cost of Rs. 283 crore.

The project for doubling of Railway line between Kirandul and Jagdalpur is expected to be completed by January 2019. Ministry of steel had signed a Memorandum of Understanding (MoU) with the Union Ministry of Railways on 21 December 2012. This project would help in significantly augmenting the evacuation capacity of NMDC’s Bailadila Sector mines by rail from the existing 28 MTPA to 40 MTPA of iron ore. For execution of the project, the Railways has divided the 150 km length of doubling work into three Sections namely, Jagdalpur to Silakjori 45.50 km, Kirandul to Gidam 52.23 km and Silakjori to Gidam 52.73 km.

== Product Mix ==
The following is the product mix proposed for the plant:

Product	Specification and Size	Uses
HR Plates & sheets	IS 2062, IS 5986, IS 3039, IS 2002 & IS 2041; 5–10 mm thickness x 1030–1650 mm width	Manufacture of bridges, steel structures, ships, large diameter pipes, storage tanks, boilers, railway wagons and pressure vessels.
API - 5L Quality	API - 5L quality plates and coils; up to X 80. 6–12 mm Thickness x up to 1650 mm width	Line Pipes used in the transportation of oil and gases.
LPG Cylinders	IS 6240; 2.0-3.15 mm thickness x 1000–1650 mm width	Used in manufacturing of LPG cylinders.
HR Coils General Engineering steels	IS 10748, IS 1079; 1.0–10 mm thickness x 900–1650 mm width	For manufacture of pipes and tubes bicycle frames, LPG cylinder frames, rings and general engineering parts.
High Carbon Steel	SAE 1040/1045; 2.5-4 x 1000-1450(thickness x width) mm x mm	Used in automobile and machine tool industries etc.
Silicon steel	for IS 15391 & IS 648; 1.0-2.0×900-1250(thickness x width) mm x mm	Used in generators, motors, and transformers.
Automotive steel	IS 11513/SAE J1392/BSK 46;1.0-6x 900-1250(thickness x width) mm x mm	Used in manufacturing of automobiles etc.

== Strategic Divestment ==
The Cabinet Committee on Economic Affairs (CCEA) had in November 2016 given its go-ahead for NMDC to offload 51% equity in the Nagarnar steel plant in favour of a private company. This was after NITI Aayog recommended such disinvestment. Upon receiving the communication from state government advising against divestment, the steel ministry had sought the Aayog’s views again and the latter remained firm on its recommendation.

The process for strategic divestment of NMDC's Nagarnar Steel plant in Chhattisgarh has kicked-off. Preliminary activities such as the appointment of Transaction Advisor, Legal Advisor and Asset Valuer have been completed and they have started collecting details. The Department of Investment and Public Asset Management (DIPAM) has prepared strategic divestment plan as per the decision of the Cabinet Committee on Economic Affairs (CCEA), Government of India for strategic divestment of various public sector enterprises (PSEs), including Nagarnar Steel plant.

The Government of Chhattisgarh again made a request to the Central Government to reconsider the decision for the strategic disinvestment of Nagarnar Steel Plant of NMDC.

NMDC's move to divest its stake in the Nagarnar steel plant has generated a groundswell of protests in the region confirming the apprehension of state government, as conveyed by it to the centre.

NMDC's rationale for bringing in a partner for its first steel venture, which has been eight years in development, is to infuse working capital and to bring in steel-making expertise.

The transaction advisors and the legal advisers engaged by NDMC for divestment have raised certain issues, like, for instance, whether it is possible to privatise the lease held by a public sector company in a scheduled area. Based on this feedback, the Inter Ministerial Group for Strategic Disinvestment has recommended to the government that the privatisation process may be deferred for the time being.
