= Kamanda =

Kamanda is both a given name and a surname. Notable people with the name include:

- Kamanda Bataringaya, Ugandan physician
- Gérard Kamanda wa Kamanda (1940–2016), Congolese politician
- Kama Sywor Kamanda (born 1952), Congolese writer
- Olivier Kamanda, American activist
