= Action Group (conglomerate) =

Indian conglomerate

- Type: Private
- Industry: Conglomerate
- Founded: 1972; 54 years ago
- Headquarters: Delhi, India
- Key people: Lala Mange Ram Agarwal (chairman)
- Products: Sports shoes, steel, chemicals, retail, medium-density fibreboard, particle board, uninterruptible power supply, infrastructure and PVC
- Revenue: 83 billion (2020)
- Net income: 30.44 billion (2020)
- Number of employees: 99,545
- Website: www.synergyactiongroup.com

Action Group is an industrial conglomerate with expertise in manufacturing of the Action Shoes brand.

== Various subsidiaries ==
Action Shoes is the most widely known business of the group. The group started from the shoe manufacturing industry and upon its success spread to other fields of steel, chemicals, computer monitors, housing projects, health care and retails. Cricketer Sachin Tendulkar was once its brand ambassador. In the electronic field, the group has two brands of inverters of Microtek and Okaya. The group started with the business of interior infrastructure, named Action TESA, and in the first year of 2011 had a turnover of ₹1.5 billion (US$22 million). Under the business name of Action Ispat, the group owns two steel projects at Jharsuguda in Orissa and Raipur in Chhattisgarh, each with the capacity of 0.25 million tonnes and planned to expand the Orissa plant to 2.5 metric tons by 2016.

- Action Shoes
- Synergy Action
- Action Ispat
- Action Chemicals
- Action TESA
- Action Retail
- Microtek Inverters
- Pioneer Flex
- Sunsity Projects

== Other initiatives ==
In 2010, the Action Group, along with the NGO Manav Sevarth Trust, opened the Action Cancer Hospital in Delhi. At the time of inauguration, which was done by the then President of India Pratibha Patil, the hospital had 150 beds. It is also associated with Sri Balaji Action Medical Institute, New Delhi.

== Court case for Microtek Inverters ==
Microtek Inverters which is owned by Action Group was sued by a customer in 2003 as a Microtek inverter in his house caught fire due to a short circuit in the inverter's unit. He filed a consumer complaint before the Delhi district forum, and the forum asked Microtek to pay a sum of ₹2,50,000 as compensation to the customer. Microtek filed for a revision before the national commission but lost.
