= Uttam Galva Steels =

Uttam Galva Steel Ltd
- Company type: Public
- Traded as: BSE: 513216; NSE: UTTAMSTL
- Industry: Steel
- Founded: 1985
- Founder: Rajendra Miglani
- Headquarters: Khopoli, Nagpur, Maharashtra, India
- Key people: Shri Rajendra Miglani Director & MD
- Products: Cold-rolled steel, galvanized steel and colour coated products
- Revenue: ▲₹44,963.8 million (US$470 million) (2009–2010)
- Net income: ▲₹1,024.7 million (US$11 million) (2009–2010)
- Number of employees: ~18,000
- Website: www.uttamgalva.com

Uttam Galva Steels Ltd. is one of the largest manufacturers of cold-rolled steel (CR) and galvanized steel (GP) in Western India. The company procures hot-rolled steel and processes it into CR, alongside further into GP and colour-coated coils.

Uttam Galva Steels runs two plants, those being Uttam Galva Metallics Limited and Uttam Value Steels Limited (previously known as Lloyds Steel Industries Limited), both at Wardha, Maharashtra. It is going to double its plant's capacity and set up a new integrated steel plant in Satara, Maharashtra.
