= Sri Balaji Action Medical Institute =

Coordinates: 28.6737837°N 77.1102673°E

Sri Balaji Action Medical Institute is a hospital in Delhi, India founded in 2005.

== History ==
In 2005, Action Group of Companies forayed into the health care sector with the launch of Sri Balaji Action Medical Institute located at Paschim Vihar.

In 2010, Action cancer hospital was started to develop it into a specialised cancer care centre with all cancer related specialities under one roof. The hospital also started imparting training through the Diplomate of National Board(DNB) program. It also started a nursing training facility under the name, Ginni Devi Action School of Nursing.

In 2011, Sri Balaji Action Medical Institute announced Cashless facility.

In 2014, The department of Neurosurgery of Sri Balaji Action Medical Institute organised ENDOSPINECON. It was two-day conference aimed at training young spine surgeons to enhance their knowledge and skill on endoscopic spine surgery.

In 2015, Sri Balaji Action Medical Institute is listed of 52 Delhi hospitals that are obligated (to varying degrees) to provide free treatment to those belonging to the Economically Weaker Section categorisation, which means a household income of less than Rs1 lakh per annum.
