= NMDC Limited =

Indian public sector mining company

- Formerly: National Mineral Development Corporation
- Type: Public
- Traded as: NSE: NMDC; BSE: 526371
- Industry: Mining
- Founded: 1958; 68 years ago
- Headquarters: Hyderabad, Telangana
- Key people: Amitava Mukherjee, Chairman-Cum-Managing Director
- Products: Iron ore, copper, diamond, graphite, coal and beach sands
- Revenue: ▲₹15,721 crore (US$1.6 billion) (2021)
- Operating income: ▲₹8,895 crore (US$920 million) (2021)
- Net income: ▲₹6,247 crore (US$650 million) (2021)
- Total assets: ▲₹36,929 crore (US$3.8 billion) (2021)
- Total equity: ▲₹29,884 crore (US$3.1 billion) (2021)
- Owner: Government of India (60.79%)
- Number of employees: 5,887 (March 2019)
- Website: www.nmdc.co.in

NMDC Limited, formerly National Mineral Development Corporation, is an Indian public sector undertaking involved in the exploration of iron ore, rock, gypsum, magnesite, diamond, tin, tungsten, graphite, coal etc. It is India's largest iron ore producer and exporter, producing more than 45 million tonnes of iron ore from three mechanized mines in Chhattisgarh and Karnataka. It also operates the only mechanized diamond mine in the country at Panna in Madhya Pradesh.

== Operating mines ==
- Bailadila Iron Ore Mine, Kirandul Complex, South Bastar district, Dantewada (C.G.)Steel
- Bailadila Iron Ore Mine, Bacheli Complex, South Bastar district, Dantewada (C.G.)
- Donimalai Iron Ore Mine, Donimalai, Bellary district, Karnataka
- Kumarswamy Iron Ore Mine, Bellary District, Karnataka
- Diamond Mining Project, Majhgawan, Panna (M.P.)

NMDC Ltd. is diversified into other raw materials for the steel industry such as low silica limestone. Production of dead burnt magnesite and further value addition is under study through its subsidiary J K Mineral Development Corporation Limited.

NMDC Ltd. has taken over a silica sand mining and beneficiation project from Uttar Pradesh State Mineral Development Corporation Ltd. The plant is designed to produce beneficiated high purity silica sand to a capacity of 300,000 tonnes per year as the raw material for production of float/sheet glass.

A memorandum of understanding has been signed between NMDC, Indian Rare Earths Limited, (IREL) and Andhra Pradesh Mineral Development Corporation to establish a joint venture for the development of Bheemunipatnam Beach Sand. The project envisages mining of beach sands, setting up of mineral separation plant for ilmenite concentrate and a downstream value addition plant for conversion of ilmenite into synthetic rutile/TiO_{2} slag/TiO_{2} pigment with pig iron as by-product.

== Geographical Footprints ==
Business Units	Products	Locations
Panna Diamond Mine	Diamond	Madhya Pradesh, India
Steel SPV and Mining JV	Special Purpose Vehicle	Jharkhand, India
Coal Mines (Rohne & Tokisud)	coal	Jharkhand, India
Nagarnar Steel Plant	Steel	Chhattisgarh, India
Bacheli Mining Complex	Iron	Chhattisgarh, India
Kirandul Mining Complex	Iron	Chhattisgarh, India
Sponge Iron Unit, Paloncha	Sponge Iron	Telangana India
Donimalai Mining Complex	Iron	Karnataka, India
Donimalai Pellet Plant	Iron Ore Pellets	Karnataka, India
Steel SPV	Special Purpose Vehicle	Karnataka, India
Legacy Iron Ore Limited	Iron	Perth, Australia
International Coal Ventures Pvt Ltd. (ICVL)	Coal	Mozambique

== NMDC Steel Limited ==
NMDC set up a 3 MTPA capacity greenfield Nagarnar Steel Plant based on HiSmelt technology, 16 km from Jagdalpur in Chhattisgarh state, with an estimated outlay of Rs 20000 crore.

A pure-play miner, NMDC had in 2009–10 conceived the Nagarnar steel plant with the intention of moving up the value chain and diversifying its portfolio. The idea was also to hedge itself against the vagaries of iron ore prices.

The plant site is around 16 km from Jagdalpur and 6 km from the Odisha–Chattishgarh border. The nearest railway station is Amaguda (around 2 km). The site is located on National Highway NH 30. The nearby airports are Jagdalpur, Raipur & Vishakhapatnam and the nearest seaport is Visakhapatnam located at a distance of approx 325 km. The nearest river is Indravati, located at a distance of 3 km.

In 2023 NMDC Steel became a publicly traded company on the Bombay Stock Exchange and National Stock Exchange of India, after a demerger from NMDC in 2022.

== Listings and shareholding ==
The equity shares of NMDC are listed on the Bombay Stock Exchange and the National Stock Exchange of India.

As of February 2020, the Government of India held a 69.65% equity in NMDC. 225,339 individual shareholders hold approximately 3.79% of its shares. The balance is held by insurance companies (14.31%), foreign institutional investors (5.78%), mutual funds (4.42%), and banks (1.96%). Life Insurance Corporation of India is the largest non-promoter shareholder in the company with a 13.699% shareholding.

== International ==
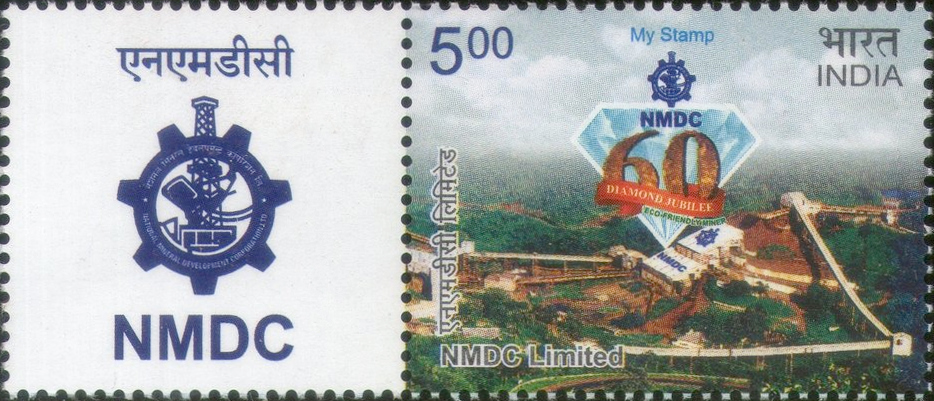
A 2017 stamp dedicated to the 60th anniversary of the National Mineral Development Corporation

In Australia, Legacy Iron Ore, a majority-owned NMDC company, holds majority stakes in gold and iron ore projects in Western Australia. In 2023, NMDC started exploring for Lithium reserves in the company's, majority owned, Mount Bevan mine in Australia.

NMDC Limited was awarded the Corporate Social Responsibility Award Global Metals Award 2018 in the Corporate Social Responsibility category in London, the first time since inception that an Indian company received the award.

== See also ==
- NMDC Lakdi-ka-pul, a co-branded metro station of Hyderabad Metro
