= Danapuram =

Dhanapura
- village
- Location in Karnataka, India Dhanapura (India)
- Coordinates: 15.28°N 76.37°E
- Country: India
- State: Karnataka
- District: Bellary
- Talukas: Hospet

Government
  - Body: Gram panchayat

Population (2011)
  - Total: 7,256

Languages
  - Official: Kannada
- Time zone: UTC+5:30 (IST)
- Postal code: 583222
- ISO 3166 code: IN-KA
- Vehicle registration: KA 35
- Website: karnataka.gov.in

Dhanapura is a village in the southern state of Karnataka, India. It is located in the Hospet taluk of Bellary district in Karnataka.

== Demographics ==
As of 2011 India census, Danapuram is a large village located in Hospet Taluka of Bellary district, Karnataka with total 1530 families residing. The Danapuram village has population of 7256 of which 3741 are males while 3515 are females as per Population Census 2011.

== See also ==
- Bellary
- Districts of Karnataka
