= Rashtriya Ispat Nigam =

Central Public Sector Undertaking

Rashtriya Ispat Nigam Limited
- Type: Central Public Sector Undertaking
- Industry: Steel; Iron
- Founded: 18 February 1982
- Headquarters: Visakhapatnam, India
- Key people: M N V S Prabhakar (Chairman & MD); GVN Prasad (Director - Commercial); Arun Kanti Bagchi (Director - Projects); Vinay Kumar (Director - Finance); Subhasis Sengupta (Director - Operations); Rakesh Nandan Sahay (Director - Personnel)
- Products: Steel and Iron
- Revenue: ▲₹20,492.03 crore (US$2.1 billion) (2018-2019)
- Net income: ▲₹96.71 crore (US$10 million) (2018-19)
- Total assets: ▲₹35,201.31 crore (US$3.7 billion) (2018-19)
- Total equity: ▲₹7,352.28 crore (US$760 million) (2018-19)
- Owner: Ministry of Steel, Government of India
- Number of employees: 8498 (July 2026)
- Subsidiaries: Eastern Investments Limited (EIL); The Orissa Minerals Development Company Limited (OMDC); The Bisra Stone Lime Company Limited (BSLC)
- Website: www.vizagsteel.com

Rashtriya Ispat Nigam Ltd (abbreviated as RINL), also known as Vizag Steel, is a central public sector undertaking under the ownership of Ministry of Steel, Government of India based in Visakhapatnam, India. Rashtriya Ispat Nigam Limited (RINL) is the government entity of Visakhapatnam Steel Plant (VSP), India's first shore-based integrated steel plant built with state-of-the-art technology. Visakhapatnam Steel Plant (VSP) is a 7.3 MTPA plant. It was commissioned in 1992 with a capacity of 3.0 MTPA of liquid steel. The CPSU subsequently completed its capacity expansion to 6.3 MTPA in April 2015 and to 7.3 MTPA in December 2017. The PSU is having one subsidiary, viz. Eastern Investment Limited (EIL) with 51% shareholding, which in turn is having two subsidiaries, viz. M/s Orissa Mineral Development Company Ltd (OMDC) and M/s Bisra Stone Lime Company Ltd (BSLC). The CPSU has a partnership in RINMOIL Ferro Alloys Private Limited and International Coal Ventures Limited in the form of Joint Ventures with 50% and 26.49% shareholding respectively. RINL is wholly owned by the Government of India.

== Location ==
The steel plant is in the southern part of Visakhapatnam city, Andhra Pradesh state of India. The company has blast furnace grade Limestone captive mine at Jaggayyapeta (Krishna District), a captive mine for Dolomite at Madharam (Khammam), a manganese ore captive mine at Cheepurupalli (Vizianagaram). It also has a mining lease for river sand on the river Champavathi.

== History ==
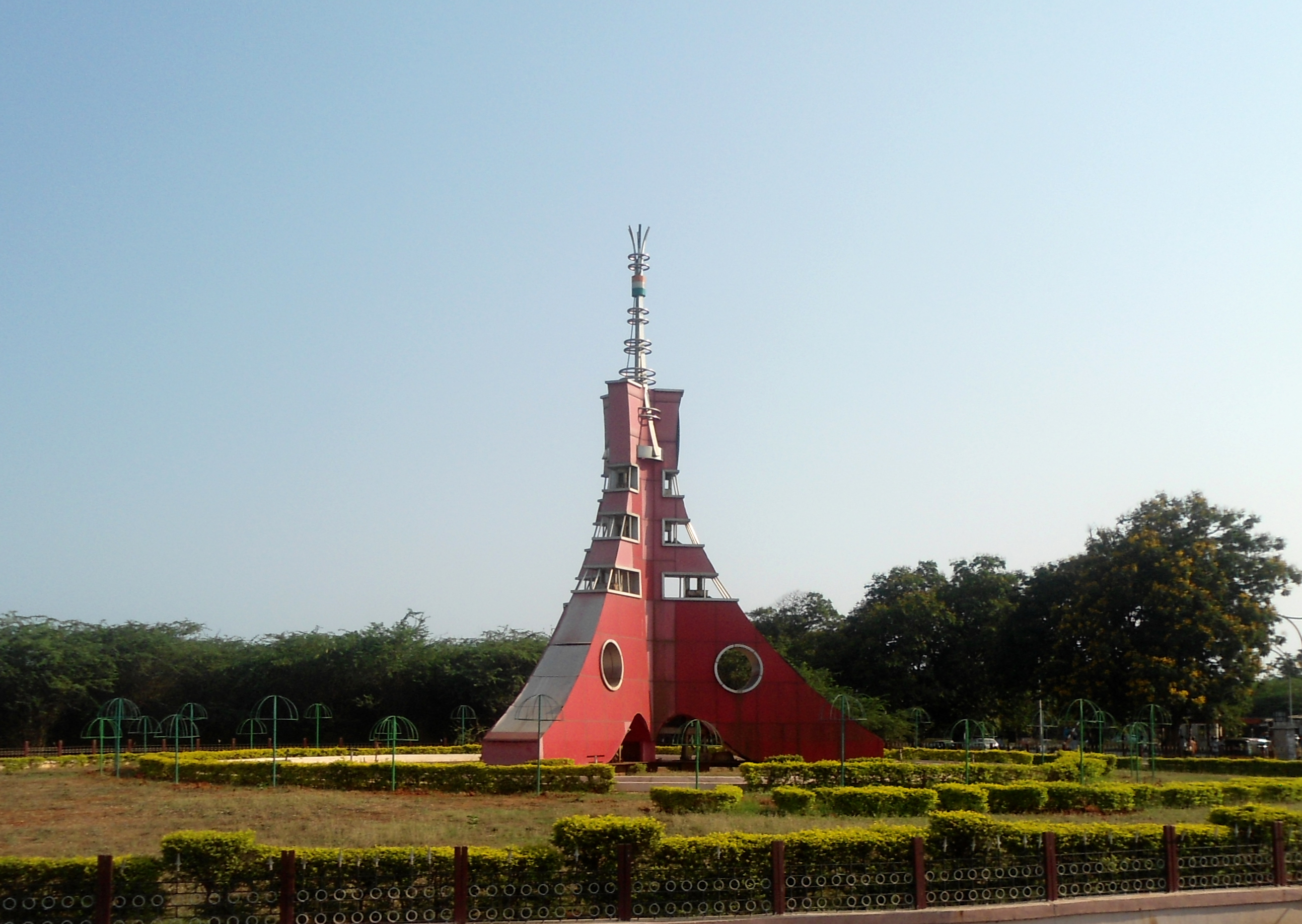
Pylon at Vizag Steel Plant

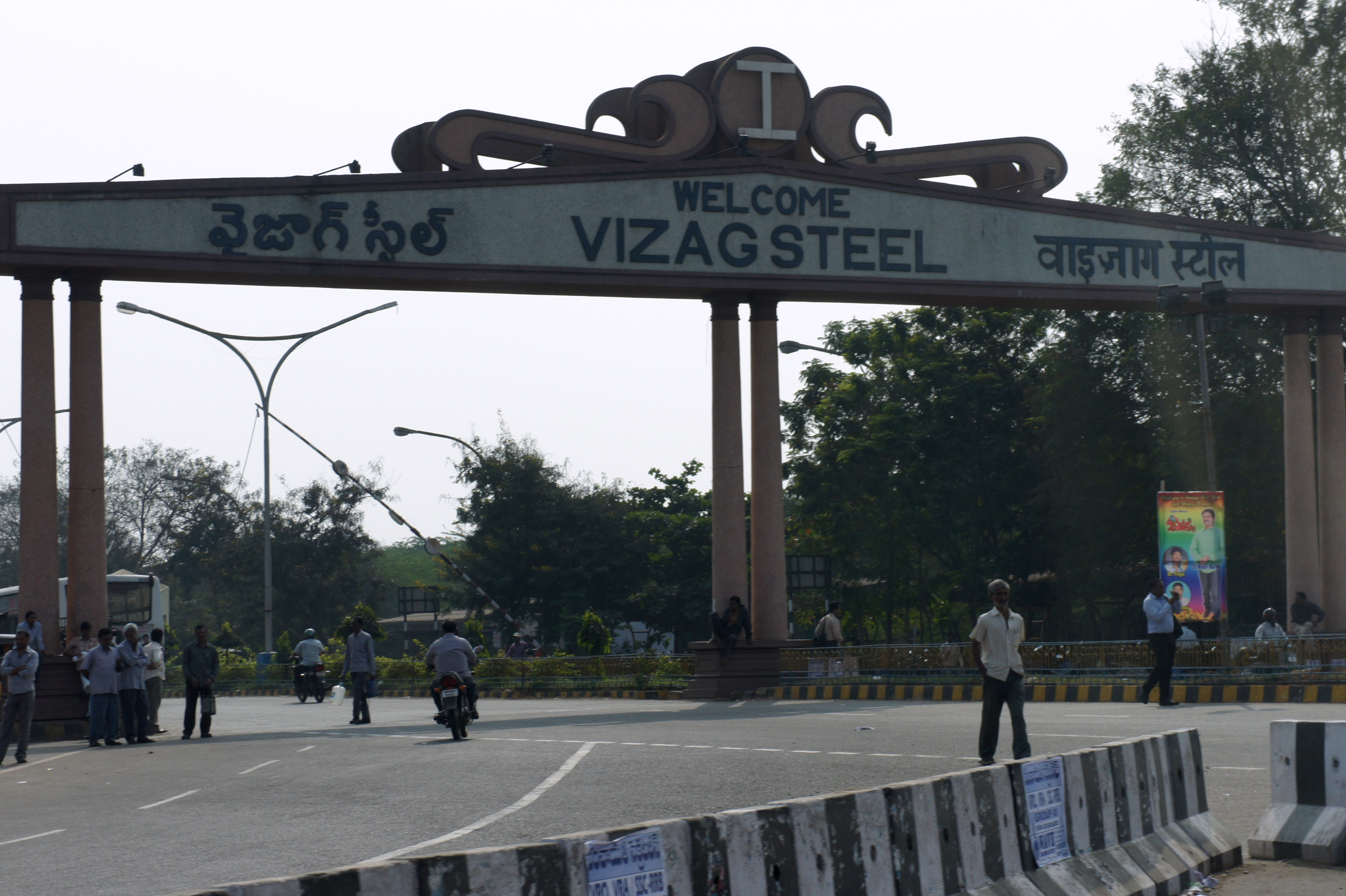
Vizag Steel

On 17 April 1970, the Prime Minister of India, Indira Gandhi, announced the government's decision to establish a steel plant at Visakhapatnam. With the offer of assistance from the government of the erstwhile USSR, a revised project evolved some years later. A detailed project report for a plant with a capacity of 3.4 Mtpa was prepared in November 1980 and in February 1981, a contract was signed with the USSR for the preparation of working drawings of coke ovens, blast furnace and sinter plant. The blast furnace foundation was laid, with first mass concreting, in January 1982. The construction of the local township was also started at the same time.

In the 1970s, Kurupam Zamindars donated 6,000 acres of land for Vizag Steel Plant. A new company Rashtriya Ispat Nigam Limited (RINL) was formed on 18 February 1982. Visakhapatnam Steel Plant was separated from SAIL and RINL was made the corporate entity of Visakhapatnam Steel Plant in April 1982.

Vizag Steel Plant is the only Indian shore-based steel plant and is situated on 33,000 acres (13,000 ha), and is poised to expand to produce up to 20 MT in a single campus. Turnover in 2011-2012 was Rs 14,457 crores. On 20 May 2009, Prime Minister Manmohan Singh launched the expansion project of Visakhapatnam Steel Plant from a capacity of 3.6 MT to 6.3 MT at a cost of Rs. 8,692 crores. But the investment was revised to 14,489 crores with the following classification:

- Expenditure for the financial year 2009-10 Rs 1840 crores.
- Rs 5883 crores since inception of the project.
- Total commitment, including enabling works, steel procurement, consultancy, spares, etc. is Rs 11591 crores as of 25 March 2010.

In November 2010, the company was granted the Navratna status by the Government of India. In September 2011, the government announced plans to divest 10% of its stake in RINL via an initial public offering. In February 2021, the Cabinet approved the privatisation of steel-maker Rashtriya Ispat Nigam Ltd (RINL). This decision caused massive protests in Vizag city.

As of 2017, the company had planned to expand its production capacity further by one more MT which required an investment of Rs.4,500 crore.

== Operations ==
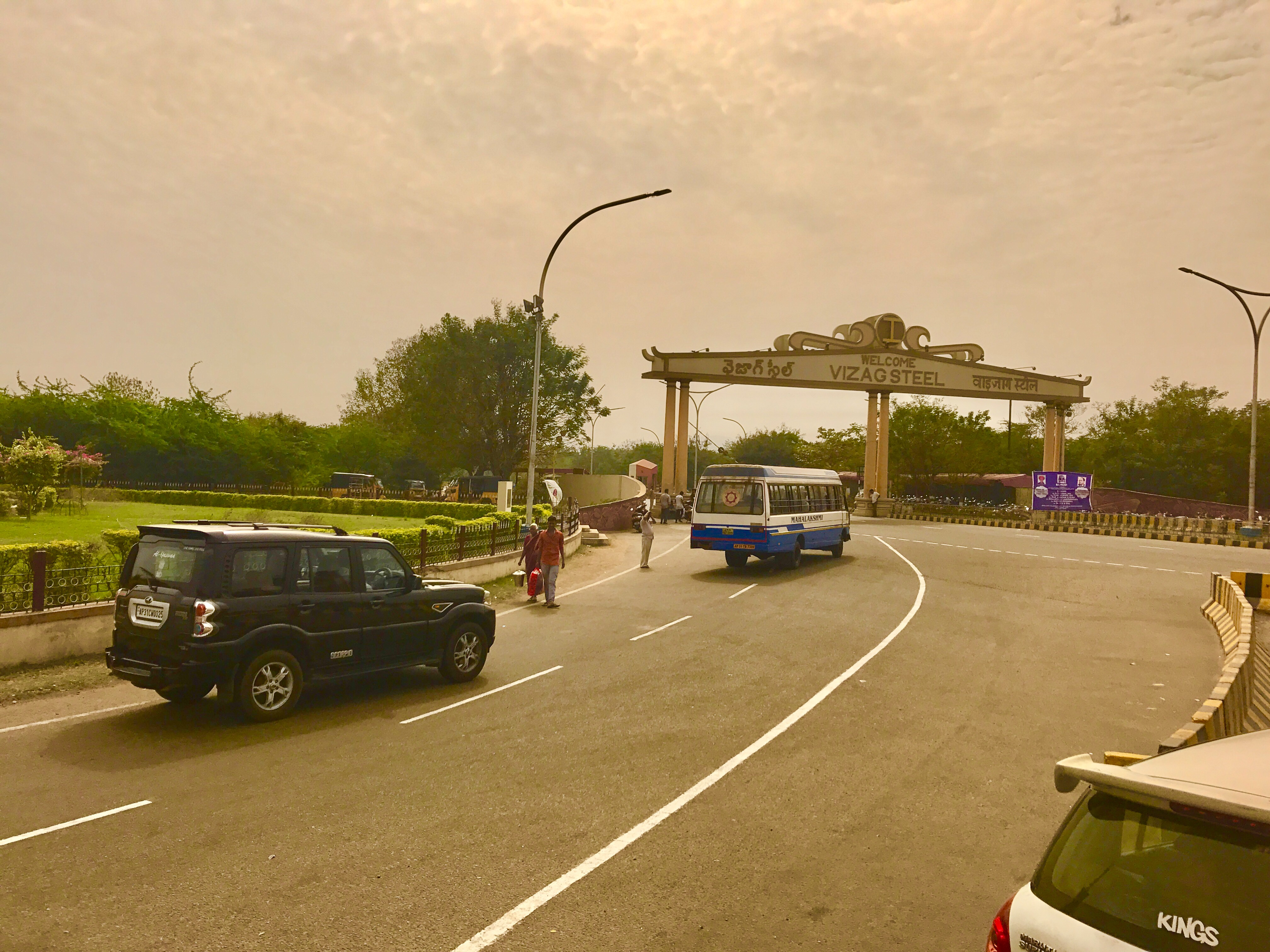
Steel Plant entrance near Kurmannapalem

RINL operates a 7.3 million tonne per annum capacity steel plant in Visakhapatnam. The Visakhapatnam Steel Plant is the integrated steel plant founded in 1982 that focuses on producing value-added steel, producing 5.773 million tonnes of hot metal, 5.272 million tonnes of crude steel and 5.138 million tonnes of saleable steel in the 2021-2022 financial year. According to the India Daily Times, the plant is expected to skyrocket in terms of production in the nearest future.

During the initial periods, the company suffered huge losses. Later the profits have gone up by 200% making it the only steel industry to achieve such a target. Its annual capacity is expected to reach almost 7.5 million tonnes by 2020. RINL plans to invest ₹60,000 crore (US$6.2 billion) to increase the capacity to 20 million tonnes by 2027.

=== Safety incidents ===
- On 13 June 2012, 19 people died during a trial run of recently commissioned oxygen plant, due to a massive explosion in the plant. Union Steel Minister Beni Prasad Verma visited and announced ₹20 lakh (US$21,000) Ex gratia to each person.
- In June 2014, two engineers were fatally injured in a suspected case of Carbon monoxide poisoning.
- On 7 November 2014, a minor explosion occurred in the Blast Furnace II but there were no casualties.
- In February 2015, an assistant general manager was involved in a fatal incident when he fell into a rotating drum.
- On 18 January 2019, a hot metal pipe was exploded in Blast furnace number 3. There were no casualties.
- On 9 June 2026, an explosion occurred in a ladle carrying molten steel at the steel melting shop . The blast triggered a fire and spilled hundreds of tonnes of molten steel, killing eight workers and injuring six others. Five regular employees and three contract workers were reported among the fatalities.

== Township ==
The Visakhapatnam Steel Plant Township (VSPT), also known as Ukkunagaram (lit. 'Steel City') was developed on 8000 acres of land, providing housing and accommodations for many of the employees. The township has 8200 dwellings spread over 12 sectors and 3900 acres, as well as a green belt of 4260 acres. The town also has several temples, churches, a mosque, gurdwara, athletic facilities, hospital, police station, post office, shopping malls, schools, indoor and outdoor stadiums. Some of the most famous temples include the Shivalayam, Goddess Kali temple, Venkateshwara temple, Shirdi Baba temple, Puri Jagannadh temple, Tri-Shakti temple, Ayyapa temple, and the Sathya Sai Baba Mandir. There are also marriage halls and clubs for conducting various activities for entertainment such as screening of movies, hosting parties, felicitating people and celebrating festivals.
